= Johnny (disambiguation) =

Johnny (also spelled Johnnie) is a given name.

Johnny or Johnnie may also refer to:

== Films ==
- Johnny (1980 film), an Indian Tamil language film
- Johnny (1993 film), a Infian Malayam language film
- Johnny (1999 film), a Canadian film directed by Carl Bessai
- Johnny (2003 film), an Indian Telugu language film
- Johnny (2018 film), an Indian Tamil language film
- Johnny (2022 film), a Polish film directed by Daniel Jaroszek

== Music ==
=== Albums ===
- Johnny (John Farnham album), 1971
- Johnny (Johnny Mathis album), 1963
- Johnny, a 2019 album by Johnny Hallyday

=== Songs ===
- "Johnny" (Basim song), 2024
- "Johnny" (Eric Church song), 2025
- "Johnny" (Salmonella Dub song), 1999
- "Johnny" (Suicide song), 1977
- "Johnny" (Yemi Alade song), 2014
- "Johnny", a song by System of a Down featured in the special edition of Toxicity
- "Johnny", a cover by Vaya Con Dios of Romanian song Sanie cu zurgălăi
- "Johnny", a song by Brockhampton from Saturation III
- "Johnny", a song by Falz from the album Moral Instruction
- "Johnny", a song by Thin Lizzy from the album Johnny the Fox
- "Johnny", a song by Neil Cicierega from the album Mouth Dreams

== Other uses ==
- Johnnie, Nevada, a ghost town
- Johnny Ace, ring name of John Laurinaitis (born 1962), American professional wrestler and producer
- Johnnie, a 1944 novel by Dorothy B. Hughes

== See also ==
- Johnnies (disambiguation)
- Jonny (disambiguation)
- Johnny gown, hospital gown
- Johnny Reb, a slang term for Southern Confederates during the American Civil War
- Johnnycake, a cornmeal flatbread
- Onion Johnny, a Breton farmer or agricultural labourers who sells onions door-to-door in the UK
