= NJO =

NJO or njo or variation, may refer to:

== NJO ==
NJO may refer to:

- National Youth Orchestra of the Netherlands
- New Jazz Orchestra, British jazz big band active from 1963 to 1970
- The New Jedi Order, a series of Star Wars novels published from 1999 to 2003

== Njo ==
Njo or njo, may refer to:

- ISO 639:njo (Mongsen Ao language), Sino-Tibetan language spoken in Nagaland, India
- Yang (surname), in the Indonesian spelling of one of its Hokkien pronunciations
- Njo or Sinjo, Indonesian nickname for Indo people
- Njo, Cameroon; a village that was merged into Douala
- Eugène N'Jo Léa (1931–2006) Cameroonian soccer player

== See also ==
- Njøs (surname)
- NOJ (disambiguation)
- JNO (disambiguation)
- Jon (disambiguation)
- ONJ (disambiguation)
- OJN (disambiguation)
