= NOJ =

NOJ, or variation, may refer to:

- Noj, Iran; a village
- Noj LTD, the maker of the Dubrovnik chess set
- Night of Joy (disambiguation), multiple subjects
- Noyabrsk Airport (IATA airport code: NOJ; ICAO airport code: USRO), Yamalo-Nenets Autonomous Okrug, Russia; near Noyabrsk
- Nonuya language (ISO 639 language code: noj)
- People's Youth of Yugoslavia (NOJ; Serbo-Croatian: Narodna omladina Jugoslavije), a predecessor to the League of Communist Youth of Yugoslavia
- New Orleans Jazz, NBA basketball team now the Utah Jazz

== See also ==
- NJO (disambiguation)
- JNO
- Jon (disambiguation)
- ONJ (disambiguation)
- OJN
