= SS Hilda =

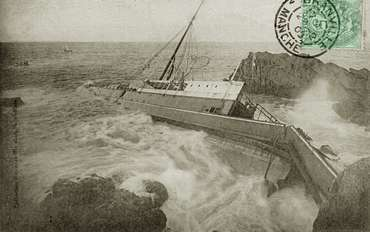
- The wreck of SS Hilda

History

United Kingdom
- Name: Hilda
- Owner: London and South Western Railway
- Port of registry: (United Kingdom) Southampton
- Route: Southampton - Jersey - St Malo (1883–90); Southampton - St Malo (1890–1905)
- Builder: Aitken & Mansel, Whiteinch, Glasgow
- Cost: £33,000
- Yard number: 117
- Launched: July 1882
- Completed: January 1883
- Out of service: 18 November 1905
- Identification: United Kingdom Official Number 86327
- Fate: Wrecked on La Pierre des Portes reef

General characteristics
- Tonnage: 848 GRT
- Length: 235 ft 6 in (71.78 m)
- Beam: 29 ft 1 in (8.86 m)
- Depth: 14 ft 2 in (4.32 m)
- Installed power: Compound steam engines 1,530 hp (1,140 kW)
- Propulsion: Single screw
- Speed: 14 knots (26 km/h)
- Capacity: 566 passengers
- Crew: 28

SS Hilda was a steamship owned by the London and South Western Railway. She was used on the Southampton - Channel Islands - St Malo service until she sank in 1905 with the loss of at least 125 lives.

== Construction ==
Hilda was built by Aitkin & Mansel, Whiteinch, Glasgow at a cost of £33,000. She was yard number 117 and was launched in July 1882. Completion was in January 1883. Hilda was 235 feet 6 inches (71.78 m) long, with a beam of 29 feet 1 inch (8.86 m) and a depth of 14 feet 2 inches (4.32 m). Hilda was powered by two 220 horsepower (160 kW) compound steam engines which were made by John and James Thompson and Company, Glasgow. They had cylinders of 37 inches (94 cm) and 69 inches (180 cm) bore by 39 inches (99 cm) stroke. The 1894-fitted boilers were made by Day, Summers and Company, of the Northam Iron Works, Southampton. These gave her a speed of 14 knots (26 km/h). She was 848 GRT, and had a licensed passenger capacity of 566. Hilda carried six lifeboats with a capacity of 348 people, as well as 12 lifebuoys and 318 lifejackets.

== Service ==
Hilda completed her sea trials on 13 January 1883 and was handed over to the LSWR that day. She was employed on the Southampton - Jersey - St Malo Service. On 7 October 1890, she was replaced by Stella on that service and transferred to the direct service between Southampton and St Malo. In 1894, new boilers were fitted by Day, Summers and Company and electric light was fitted throughout the ship.

== Sinking ==
Hilda had left Southampton at 22:00 on 17 November 1905 on her regular service to Saint-Malo in Brittany. She was carrying 103 passengers. Thick fog forced her to anchor off Yarmouth, Isle of Wight to await better weather conditions. The voyage was resumed at 06:00 on 18 November. Hilda passed through the Race of Alderney at 12:30, and after leaving Jersey behind, the weather conditions worsened. By 18:00, Hilda was approaching St Malo. The lights from the town were visible, as was the Jardin Lighthouse but snow squalls reduced visibility and Captain Gregory was forced to abandon the attempt to reach port.

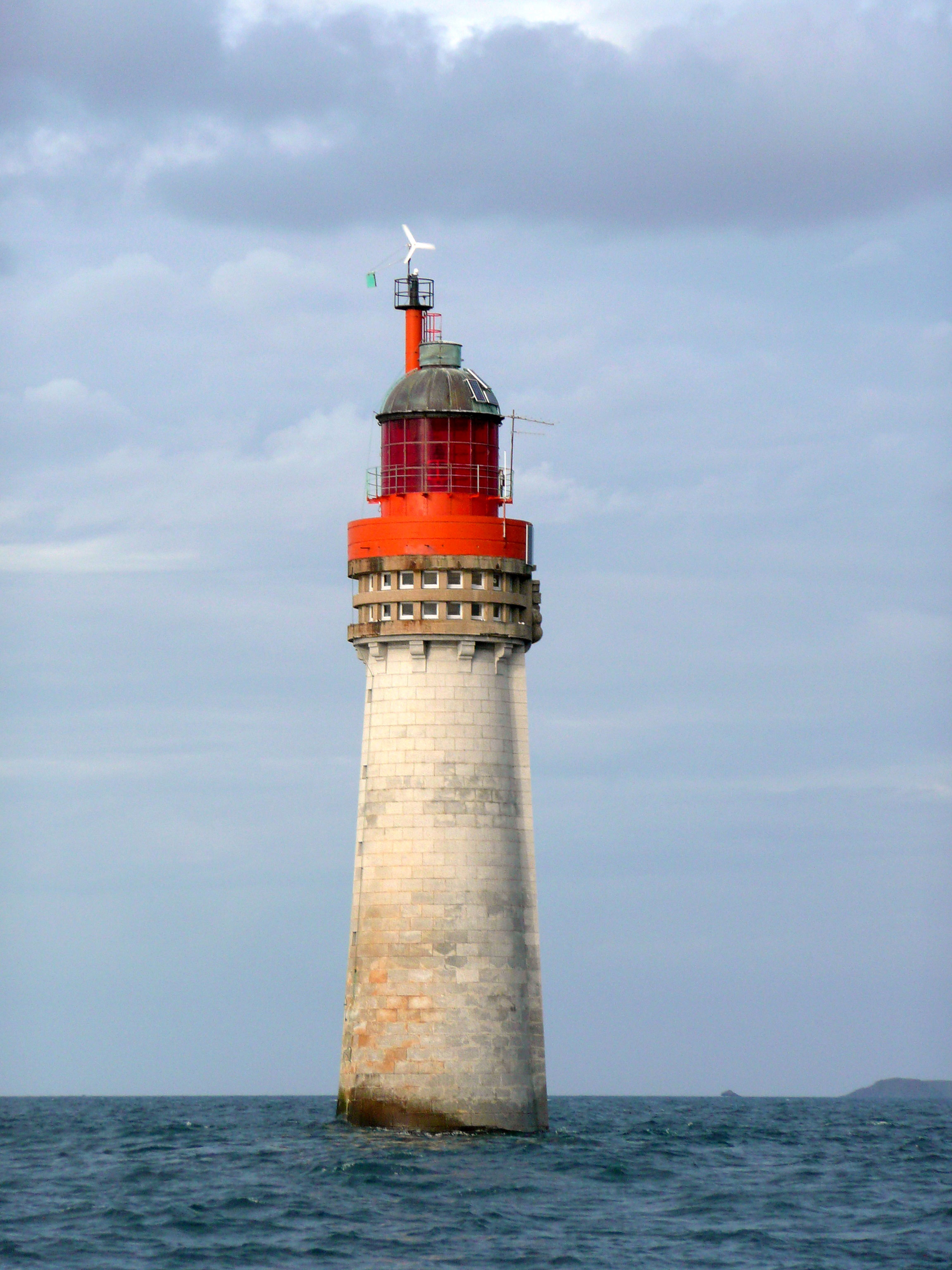
Grand Jardin Lighthouse

Several times the visibility improved briefly but then deteriorated. Hilda was forced to abandon each attempt to reach port. Around 23:00, the visibility improved again and another attempt to enter the harbour was made. A few minutes later, Hilda struck the Pierre de Portes rocks, which lie to the west of the entrance channel to St Malo harbour. Distress rockets were fired and the passengers donned their lifejackets. Attempts were made to launch the lifeboats, but five of them either could not be launched or were dashed to pieces on the rocks. The sixth washed up at Saint-Cast-le-Guildo, some 15 miles (24 km) west of St Malo. The tide was ebbing, and Hilda broke in two some 15 minutes after running aground. About 20 or 30 people on the stern part of the wreck managed to climb the rigging to await rescue. By 09:00 on 19 November, when they were discovered by SS Ada, only six remained. A total of 125 people had died. Amongst the dead were 70 Breton "Onion Johnnies" returning from selling produce in Britain.

Captain William Gregory had been employed by London and South Western Railway for 36 years. He joined the company in 1869 at the age of 20. His first command was SS Honfleur in 1880. In 1885, he was appointed as master of Hilda. The only surviving crew member was able-bodied seaman James Grinter. He had been twice shipwrecked before. The five surviving passengers were Olivier Caroff of Roscoff, Tanguy Laot of Cléder, Jean Louis Mouster of La Feuillée, Paul-Marie Pen of Cléder and Louis Rozec of Plouzévédé.

Another London and South Western Railway steamer, SS Stella, was wrecked on The Casquets, Channel Islands, on 30 March 1899 with 112 fatalities. On 21 February 1907 the Great Eastern Railway suffered the loss of SS Berlin, wrecked off the Hook of Holland with 141 fatalities.

== Inquiry ==
An inquiry was held under the Merchant Shipping Act 1894 into the circumstances of the loss of Hilda. It was held at the Caxton Hall, Caxton St, London with the Court of Inquiry sitting on 1, 2 and 8 February 1906. The inquiry found that the ship was seaworthy, with lifesaving equipment provision meeting the legislated standard of the time. There was no finding of recklessness or negligence on the part of Captain Gregory.

== Legacy ==
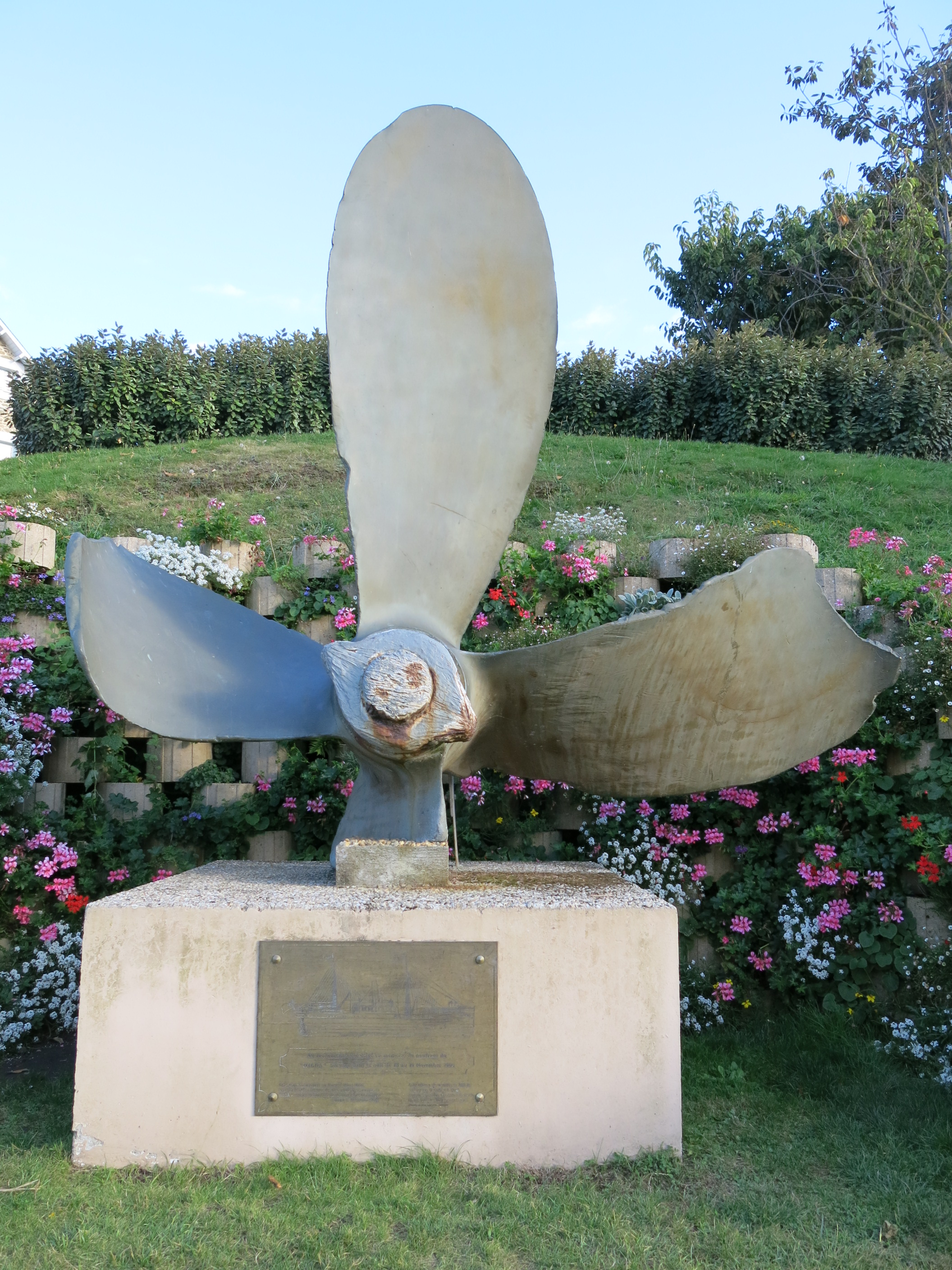
Memorial to the victims of Hilda at Dinard. Her propeller has been mounted in a stone base.

The remains of Hilda lie at 48°40.49′N 2°5.72′W in 25 metres (82 ft) of water at high tide. The engines, boilers, propeller shaft and some ironwork remain. The propeller was removed in 1997 and is on display in Dinard. In November 2005, an exhibition was held in St Malo commemorating the 100th anniversary of the shipwreck. On 19 November, flowers were cast upon the water at the wreck site in memory of the victims, and some divers placed a string of onions on the wreck in memory of the Onion Johnnies. A memorial service was held in St Malo Cathedral on 20 November.

== See also ==
- List of shipwrecks
- List of United Kingdom disasters by death toll
