= OJN (disambiguation) =

OJN is an abbreviation for Order of Julian of Norwich, a contemplative community of monks and nuns in the Episcopal Church.

OJN may also refer to:

- OJN (musician), a musician signed on to Loca Records
- OJN (song), a 1984 song by Hal Russell off the album Conserving NRG
- Orkhon Jims Nogoo (stock ticker: OJN), a foodstuffs company listed on the Mongolian Stock Exchange, see List of companies listed on the Mongolian Stock Exchange

== See also ==
- ONJ (disambiguation)
- JNO (disambiguation)
- Jon (disambiguation)
- NJO (disambiguation)
- NOJ (disambiguation)
