= Jno =

Jno may refer to:

- Jno., an abbreviation for the name John common until the early 20th century; contrary to belief, it is not an abbreviation of "Jonathan" (Jna)
- JNO (disambiguation)
