= JNO =

JNO may refer to:

== People ==
- "Jno.", abbreviation of the given name John; often mis-transcribed from handwritten census as Ino.
- JNO "Jay Nathan" (born 2000; stagename: JNO) Filipino American Singer
- Jeffrey Hatrix (born 1963; stagename: JNo) U.S. singer-songwriter
- JNO Racing (motorsports) a race car team that participated in the 1972 Can-Am season

== Other uses ==
- JNO (Jump No Overflow), a machine code instruction in x86 for arithmetic overflow, see Branch (computer science)
- Workers Nationalist Youth (JNO; Spanish: Joventut Nacionalista Obrera) of the Valencian Community in Spain

== See also ==
- John (disambiguation)
- JON (disambiguation)
- ONJ (disambiguation)
- OJN (disambiguation)
- NJO (disambiguation)
- NOJ (disambiguation)
