= Oignon de Roscoff =

Variety of onion grown in Brittany, France

- Type: Onion
- Place of origin: France
- Region or state: Brittany

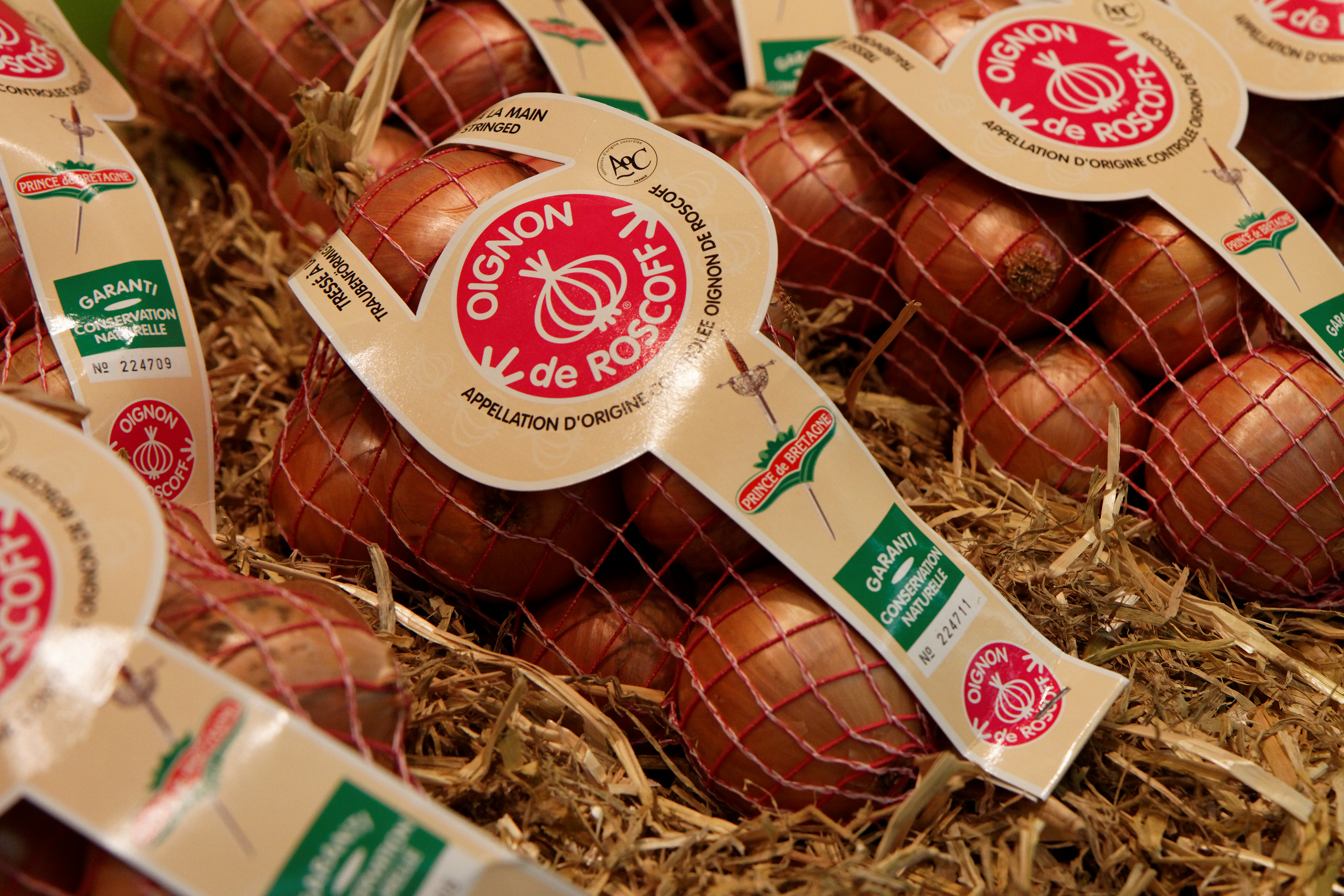
Oignon de Roscoff at the Paris International Agricultural Show in 2011

The Oignon de Roscoff is a variety of onion that is grown in the Brittany region of northwest France. The use of the name is protected by appellation d'origine contrôlée (AOC) certification that was awarded in 2009, restricting the name to onions grown in a delimited area of the northern coast of Finistère, which includes the commune of Roscoff.

In the 17th century, a monk brought pink onions from Portugal which he had appreciated during a stay in the country. He taught his neighbors at the Couvent de Roscoff how to grow the very sweet and fragrant onion. It is a variety of pink onion of the species Allium cepa cultivated traditionally in the region, which is characterized by the pinkish-coppery color of the outer coats and by its average size between 40 and 80 mm in diameter. The name of the appellation refers to Roscoff, the historical cradle of production and for a long time the only export port to Great Britain. The control and management body for this appellation is the Syndicate of the Controlled Designation of Origin “Oignon de Roscoff” headquartered in Saint-Pol-de-Léon.

The onions were sold door to door in Britain by men who came from Brittany, known as "Onion Johnnies".

A Protected designation of origin (PDO) application was submitted to the European Commission in 2010. This was awarded in 2013 and is recognized by all member countries of the European Union.

The Roscoff Onion Festival started in 2003 and is held annually in Roscoff in August. The museum of the Onion Johnnies in Roscoff (La Maison des Johnnies et de l'Oignon de Roscoff) traces the cultural traditions of the onions and the Johnnies.
