= ONJ =

ONJ may refer to:

- Olivia Newton-John (1948–2022), an English-born Australian singer and actress
- Osteonecrosis of the jaw, a severe bone disease that affects the maxilla and the mandible
- Odate-Noshiro Airport (IATA airport code: ONJ), in Akita Prefecture, Japan
- Onjob language (ISO 639 language code: onj)
- Orchestre National de Jazz, a French jazz ensemble

== See also ==
- OJN
- JNO
- Jon (disambiguation)
- NJO (disambiguation)
- NOJ (disambiguation)
