= Johnnies =

Johnnies or Johnnys may refer to:

== Sport ==
- Huntington Johnnies, a former minor league baseball based in Huntington, Indiana
- Johnstown Johnnies, a former minor league baseball team in Johnstown, Pennsylvania, US
- Johnstown Johnnies (basketball), a former basketball team based in Johnstown, Pennsylvania, US

== Music ==
- Johnnys, a Japanese boy band active from 1962 to 1967
- The Johnnys, an Australian pub rock band

== Nicknames ==
- Johnnies, nickname of John Martin's, a former department store in Adelaide, Australia
- Johnnies, nickname of the men's college at College of Saint Benedict and Saint John's University, Minnesota, US
- Johnnies, nickname of students and faculty at St. John's College in Annapolis, Maryland and Santa Fe, New Mexico

== See also ==
- The 2 Johnnies, an Irish comedy duo
- Onion Johnnies, Breton farmers and agricultural labourers who sell onions door to door in Great Britain
- Stage Door Johnnies, gentlemen who waited at the stage door for the Edwardian chorus girls known as the Gaiety Girls, in London
- Stage Door Johnnies (album), 1974 album by Claire Hamill
