= Jons (disambiguation) =

Jons is a commune in the Rhône department in eastern France.

Jons may also refer to:

- Jöns, a Swedish name
- Mattias Jons (born 1982), Swedish hammer thrower
- JONS or Juntas de Ofensiva Nacional-Sindicalista, former Spanish political movement

== See also ==
- Jon (disambiguation)
