= Jonny (disambiguation) =

Jonny is a given name.

Jonny may also refer to:

- Jonny (band), British musical group
- Jonny (Jonny album), 2011
- Jonny (The Drums album), 2023
- Jonny (chess), a computer chess program

== See also ==
- Johnny (disambiguation)
- Jon (disambiguation)
