= Johnnie, Nevada =

- Populated Place
- Location within Nevada Location within the United States
- Country: United States
- State: Nevada
- County: Nye
- Named for: Indian Johnnie, an acquaintance of early prospectors.
- Elevation: 3,310 ft (1,010 m)

Johnnie is a populated place in Nye County, in the U.S. state of Nevada about 15 miles north of Pahrump.

== History ==
The Johnnie Mine, located about 4 miles northeast of Johnnie, was established in 1890 when a group of five prospectors were exploring the area in search of the Lost Breyfogle mine. The Johnnie Mine produced between $382,681 and over a million dollars by 1913. Outcrops of gold were discovered in the nearby Spring Mountains, and the discovery led to a rush of miners to the area. The community was named after Indian Johnnie, an acquaintance of early prospectors. By May 1891, a hundred people were in the camp. Houses, stores and saloons were built. One source states that a post office was established later that year. Another source states that the post office was named Johny Post Office from June 1898 until April 1899.

Availability of water was a problem for the bustling camp. Water was retrieved from a spring four miles away, packed in canvas bags and hauled back to town by donkeys. The camp started to decline after 1893. The settlement revived in 1898 when new investors bought the two largest mines in the district, the Johnnie and the Congress mines. After 1904, Johnnie was swept up in the rush to the area near Goldfield and Bullfrog. A post office was reopened in May 1905 and a new town site was established closer to the mines. In 1907, the town had a population of 300. The Johnnie Mine and mill continued production until 1914. The Johnnie Post Office closed in December 1914, reopening in April 1916 and closing again in November 1935. Placer gold was found in gulches every few years and the area was worked off and on for the next thirty years. The Johnny settlement had less than 10 people by the late 1930s. The Johnnie Post Office was closed in 1935. The Johnnie Mine Post Office operated from September 1937 until June 1942.

In 2014, ownership of the abandoned April Fool, Johnnie, Teddys and the Teddys Terror were transferred to the Pahrump Valley Museum and Historical Society.
