= Njøs =

Njøs is a Norwegian surname.

Njøs may refer to:

- Arnor Njøs (born 1930), Norwegian soil researcher
- Grunde Njøs (born 1967), Norwegian speed skater
- Knut H. Njøs (1883-1934), Norwegian politician
