= Workers Nationalist Youth =

Workers Nationalist Youth (in Valencian: Joventut Nacionalista Obrera) was a left-wing nationalist youth movement in the Valencian Community, Spain. JNO was formed in 1921, and opted for the right of self-determination. JNO was short-lived, and was soon to be dissolved.
