= Night of Joy (disambiguation) =

Night of Joy is a live album by the American band Widespread Panic.

Night of Joy may also refer to:

- Night of Joy (festival), an annual Christian music festival at Walt Disney World Resort, Florida, USA
- "Night of Joy", a song from the album Mountain Battles by American band The Breeders
- Night Of Joy, fictional strip club in the novel A Confederacy of Dunces by American writer John Kennedy Toole
