= Onion Johnny =

Breton onion salesmen in the UK

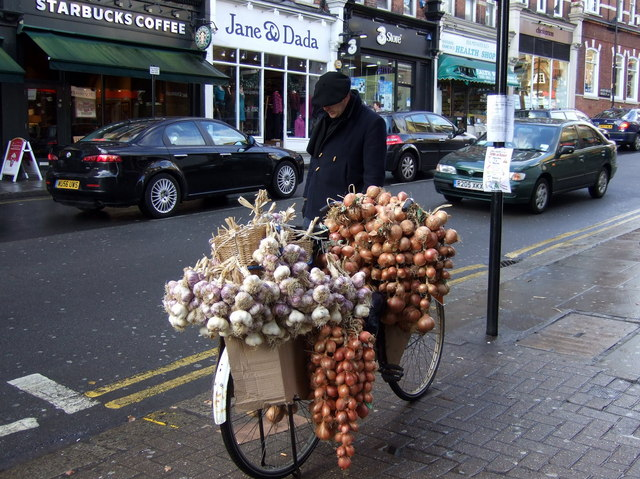
Onion Johnny in Hampstead, London, 2008

Onion Johnnies (Welsh: 'Sioni Winwns' or 'Sioni Nionod') were Breton farmers and agricultural labourers who travelled, originally on foot and later on bicycles, selling distinctive pink onions door to door in Great Britain. They were especially active in Wales, where they share linguistic similarities.

They adapted this nickname for themselves in Breton as ar Johniged or ar Johnniged.

Declining since the 1950s to only a few, the Onion Johnny was once very common. Dressed in a striped Breton shirt and beret, riding a bicycle hung with onions, the Onion Johnny became the stereotypical image of the Frenchman in the United Kingdom. In many cases these tradesmen may have been the only contact that ordinary British people had with France and French people.

With renewed interest since the late 1990s by farmers and the public in small-scale agriculture, the number of Onion Johnnies made a small recovery. The profession was eventually wiped out due to Brexit and the COVID-19 pandemic.

== History ==
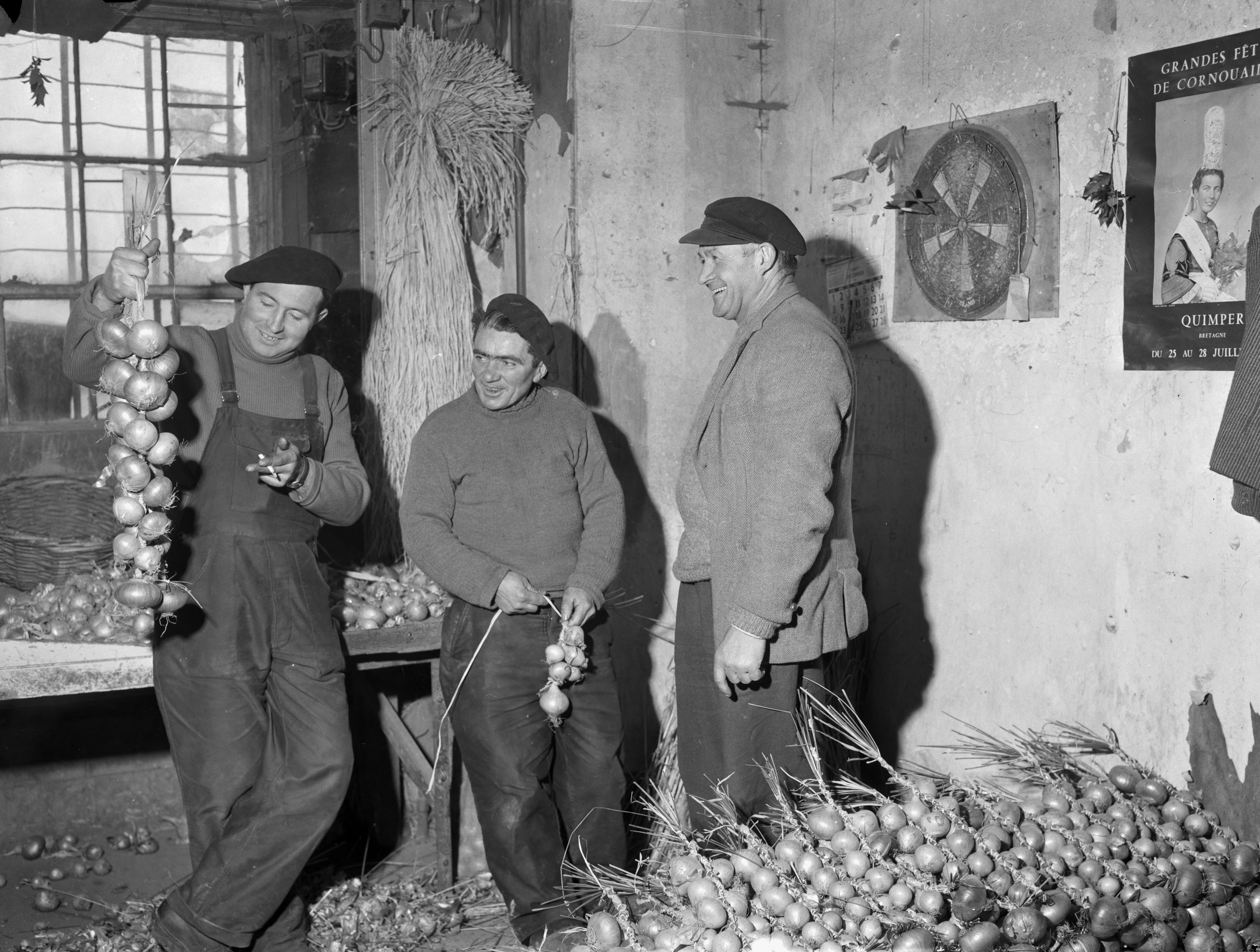
Stringing onions in Porthmadog, Wales (1958)

The trade may have begun in 1828 when the first successful trip is said to have been made by Henri Ollivier. From the area around Roscoff in Brittany known as Bro Rosko, Johnnies found a more profitable market in Britain than in France. They typically took their harvest across the English Channel in July to store in rented barns, returning home in December or January. They could have sold their produce in Paris, but the roads and the railways were bad in the 19th century and going up the river Seine was a longer and more difficult trip. Crossing the Channel to England was shorter and easier.

As the early Johnnies were all Breton-speakers, Wales was a favoured destination. Breton is a Brythonic language related to Welsh and Cornish, so the Johnnies would have had an easier time picking up Welsh than Germanic-descended English. The Johnnies who regularly visited Wales in the nineteenth century became known as Sioni Winwns and subsequently as Johnny Onions or Onion Johnny in English.

The golden age for Johnnies across the UK was during the 1920s; in 1929 nearly 1,400 Johnnies exported more than 9,000 tonnes of onions to the UK. The Great Depression, followed by the devaluation of the Pound in the early 1930s, ended the era. Trade suddenly fell, reaching a low in 1934, when fewer than 400 people imported under 3,000 tonnes.

In the aftermath of World War II, in common with other goods, onions were subject to import restrictions in the UK and had to be traded through a single company. By 1973 the number of Johnnies had dropped to 160, trading 1,100 tonnes. By the end of the 20th century, the number of Johnnies fell to around 20. By 2008, reportedly only 15 Johnnies remained, and by 2022, with travel restrictions caused by Brexit and the COVID-19 pandemic, the profession was "wiped out".

The Channel crossings are now made by ferry, but small sailing ships and steamers were used previously. The crossing could be hazardous. Seventy Johnnies died when the steamer SS Hilda sank at Saint-Malo in 1905.

== In culture ==
The Onion Johnny museum opened in Roscoff in 2004, with a two-day Fête de l'Oignon (Onion Festival) that has since been held every summer. Since 2009 the Oignon de Roscoff has been protected under the French Appellation d'Origine Contrôlée designation.
