= Roscoff =

Roscoff Rosko (Breton)
- Commune
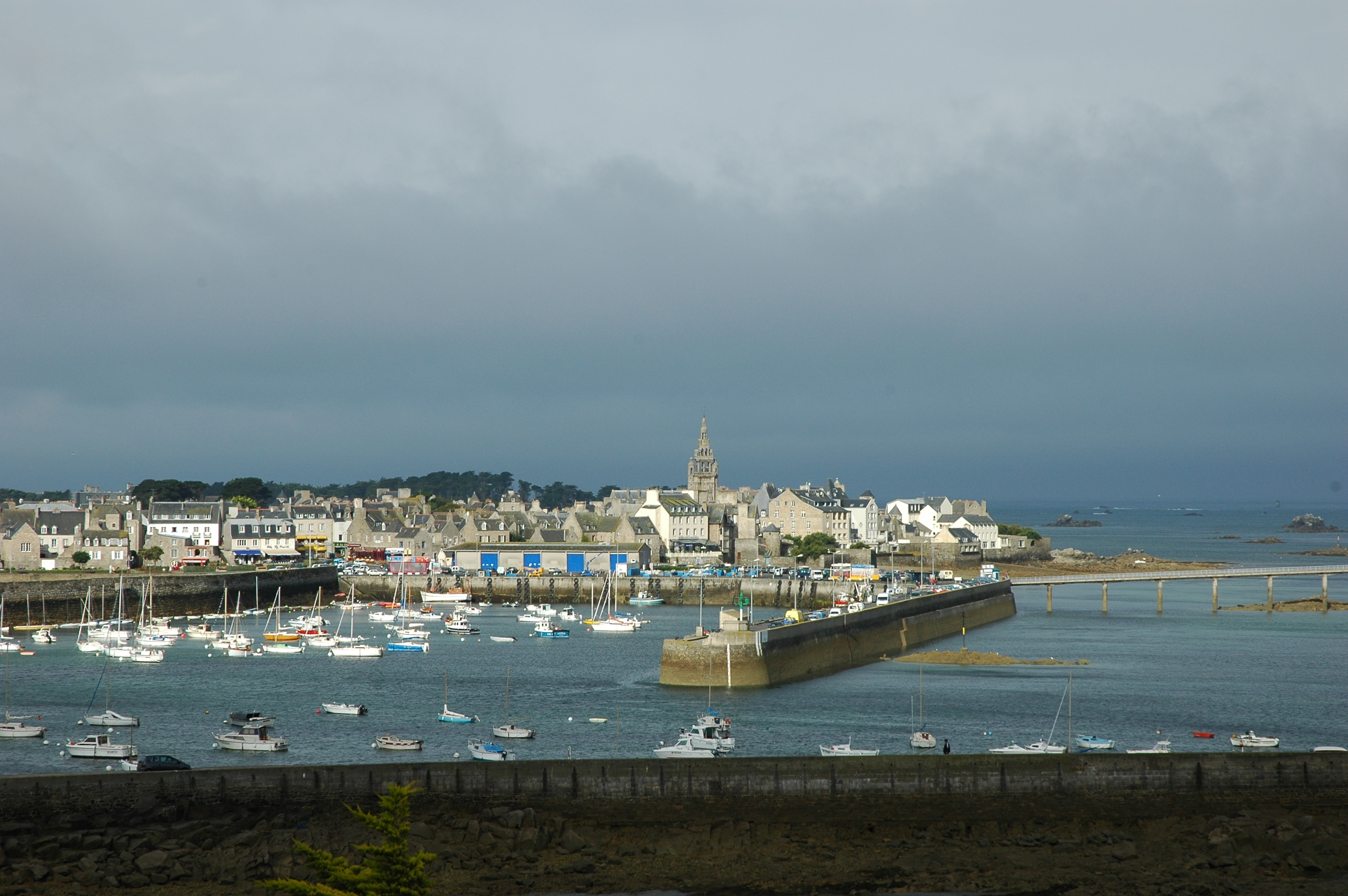
- Centre of Roscoff from Sainte Barbe chapel

- Flag Coat of arms
- Location of Roscoff
- Location within France Location within Brittany
- Coordinates: 48°44′00″N 3°59′00″W
- Country: France
- Region: Brittany
- Department: Finistère
- Arrondissement: Morlaix
- Canton: Saint-Pol-de-Léon
- Intercommunality: Haut-Léon Communauté

Government
  - Mayor (2020–2026): Odile Thubert Montagne
- Area^{1}: 6.19 km^{2} (2.39 sq mi)
- Elevation: 6 m (20 ft)
- Highest elevation: 58 m (190 ft)
- Lowest elevation: 0 m (0 ft)
- Population (2023): 3,334
  - Density: 539/km^{2} (1,390/sq mi)
- Time zone: UTC+01:00 (CET)
  - Summer (DST): UTC+02:00 (CEST)
- INSEE/Postal code: 29239 /29680
- ^{1} French Land Register data, which excludes lakes, ponds, glaciers > 1 km^{2} (0.386 sq mi or 247 acres) and river estuaries.

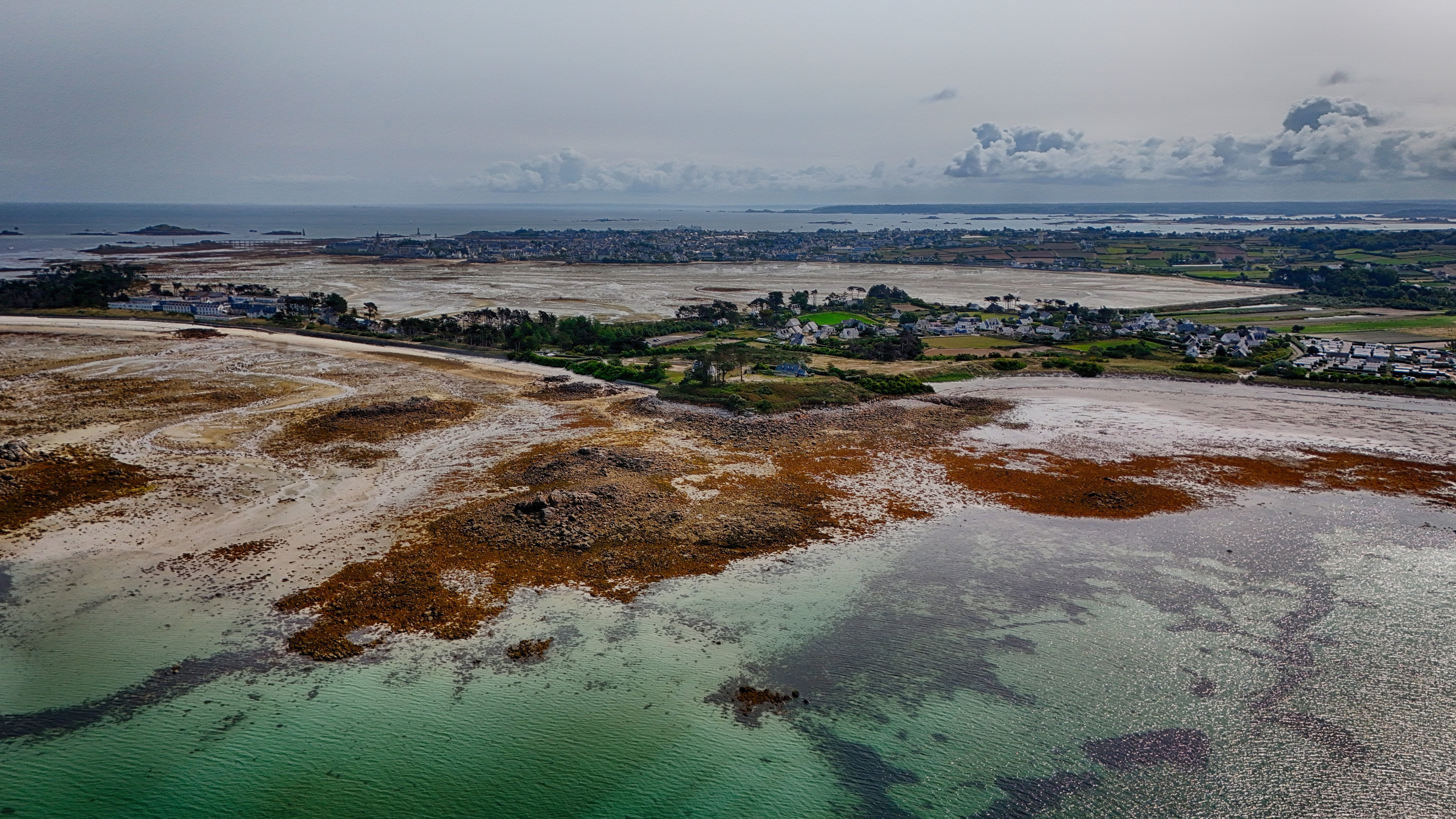
Beaches near Roscoff from the air

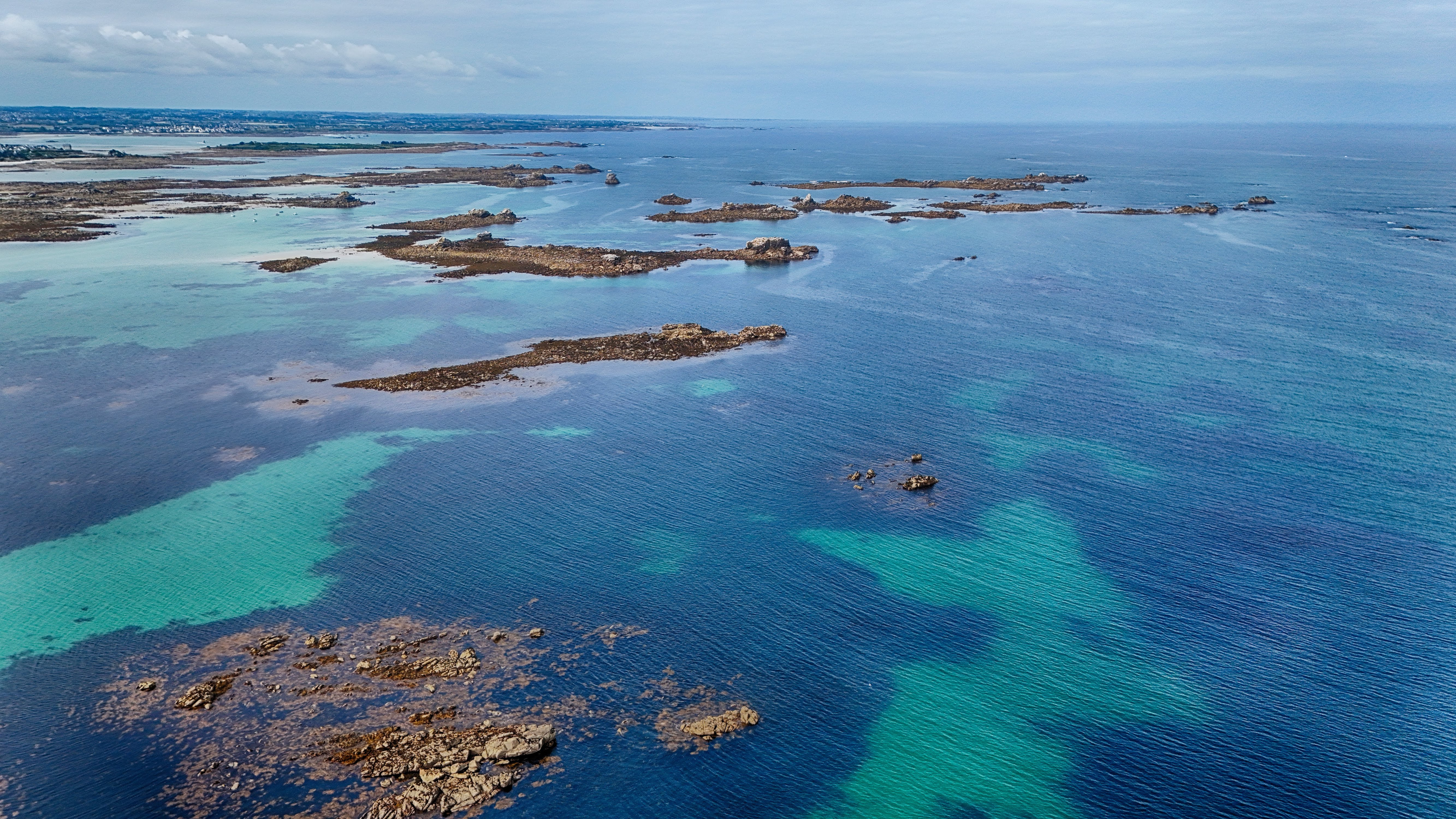
Aerial view of tidal islets off the coast of Roscoff, Brittany

Roscoff (/ˈrɒskoʊ/ ROSS-koh; Breton: Rosko; French: [ʁɔskɔf]) is a commune in the Finistère département of Brittany in northwestern France.

Roscoff is renowned for its picturesque architecture, labelled petite cité de caractère de Bretagne (small town of character) since 2009. Roscoff is also a traditional departure point for Onion Johnnies.

After lobbying by local economic leaders headed by Alexis Gourvennec, the French government agreed in 1968 to provide a deep-water port at Roscoff. Existing ferry operators were reluctant to take on the relatively long Plymouth–Roscoff crossing so Gourvennec and colleagues founded Brittany Ferries. Since the early 1970s Roscoff has been developed as a ferry port for the transport of Breton agricultural produce and for motor tourism. Brittany Ferries link Roscoff with both Ireland and the United Kingdom.

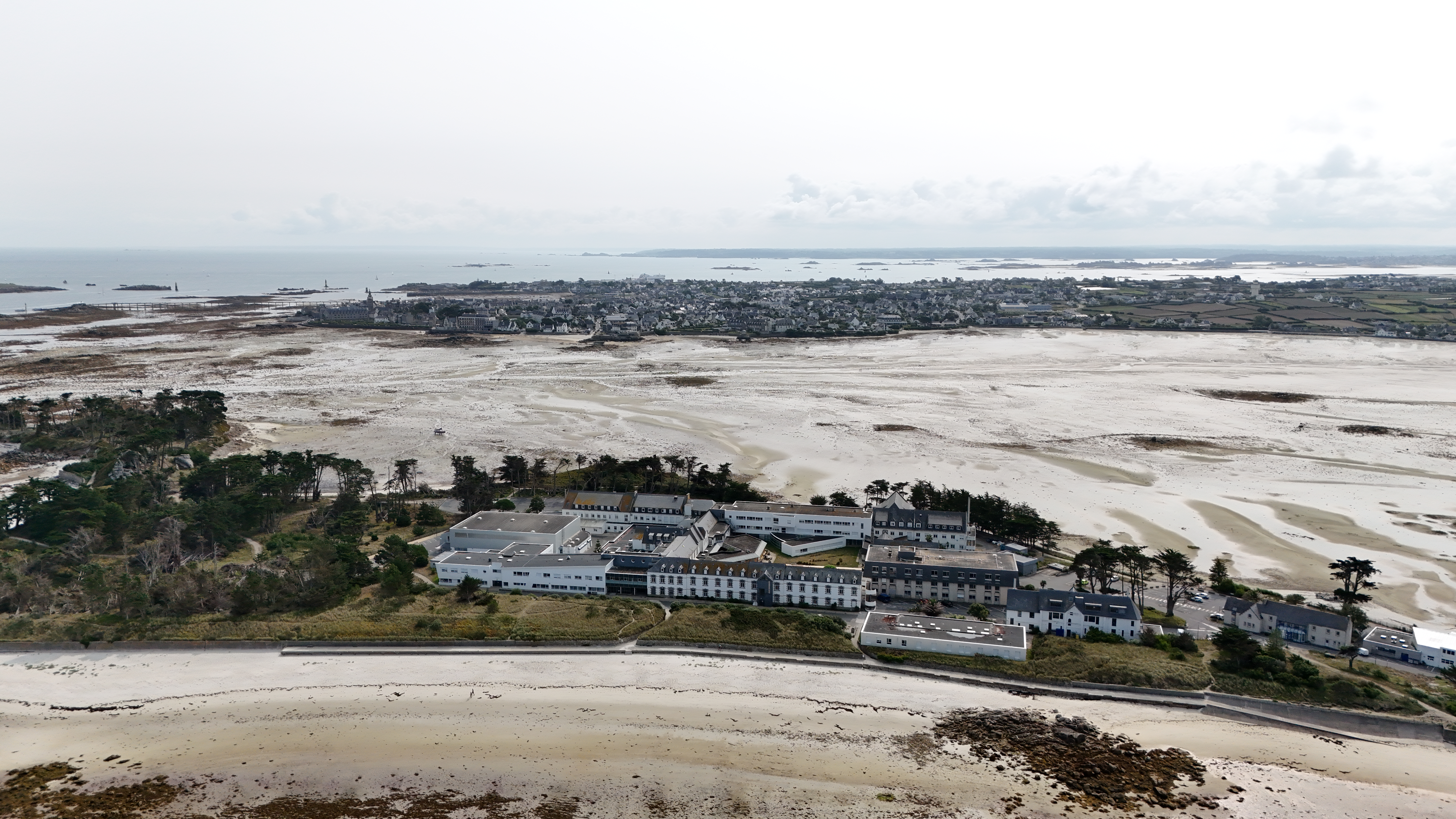
Aerial view of the Perharidy medical complex in Roscoff

Owing to the richness of iodine in the surrounding waters and the mild climate maintained by a sea current that varies only between 8 and 18 °C (46 and 64 °F), Roscoff is also a centre of post-cure, which gave rise to the concept of thalassotherapy in the latter half of the 19th century. A French doctor, Louis-Eugène Bagot, opened the Institut Marin in Roscoff in 1899, the first centre for thalassotherapy in Europe. Since then many important centres of thalassotherapy such as the Institut de Rockroum (originally Institut marin), the clinic Kerléna and a heliomarin hospital founded in 1900, the Perharidy Centre, can be found by the sea at Roscoff.

The nearby Île de Batz, called Enez Vaz in Breton, is a small island that can be reached by launch from the harbour.

== Sights ==
- Roscoff parish church Our Lady of Croaz Batz (Notre Dame de Croaz Batz): Renaissance and Gothic church from the 16th century
- The house known as "that of Mary, Queen of Scots"
- The Station Biologique de Roscoff, a research laboratory in oceanography and marine biology
- The Jardin Exotique de Roscoff
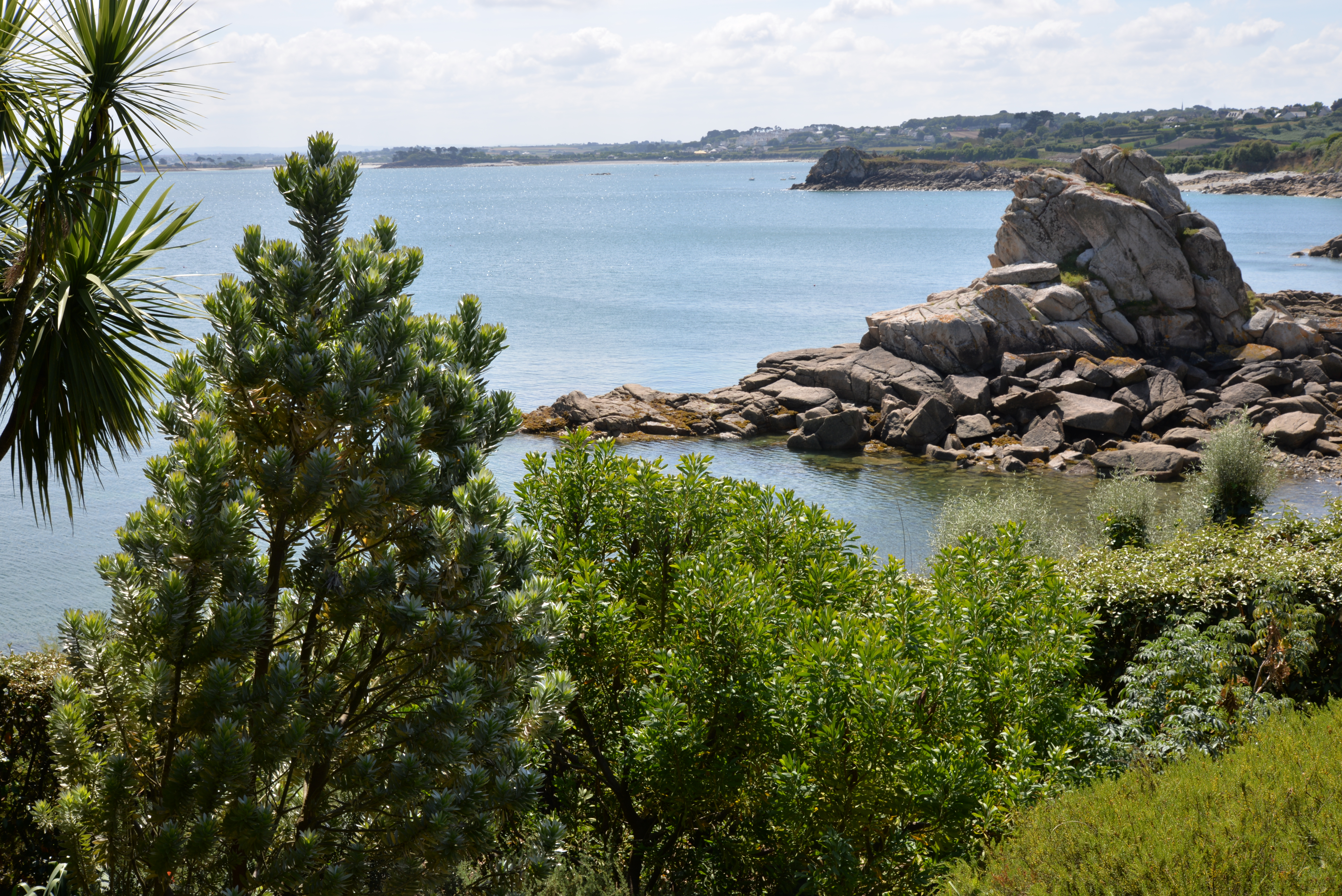

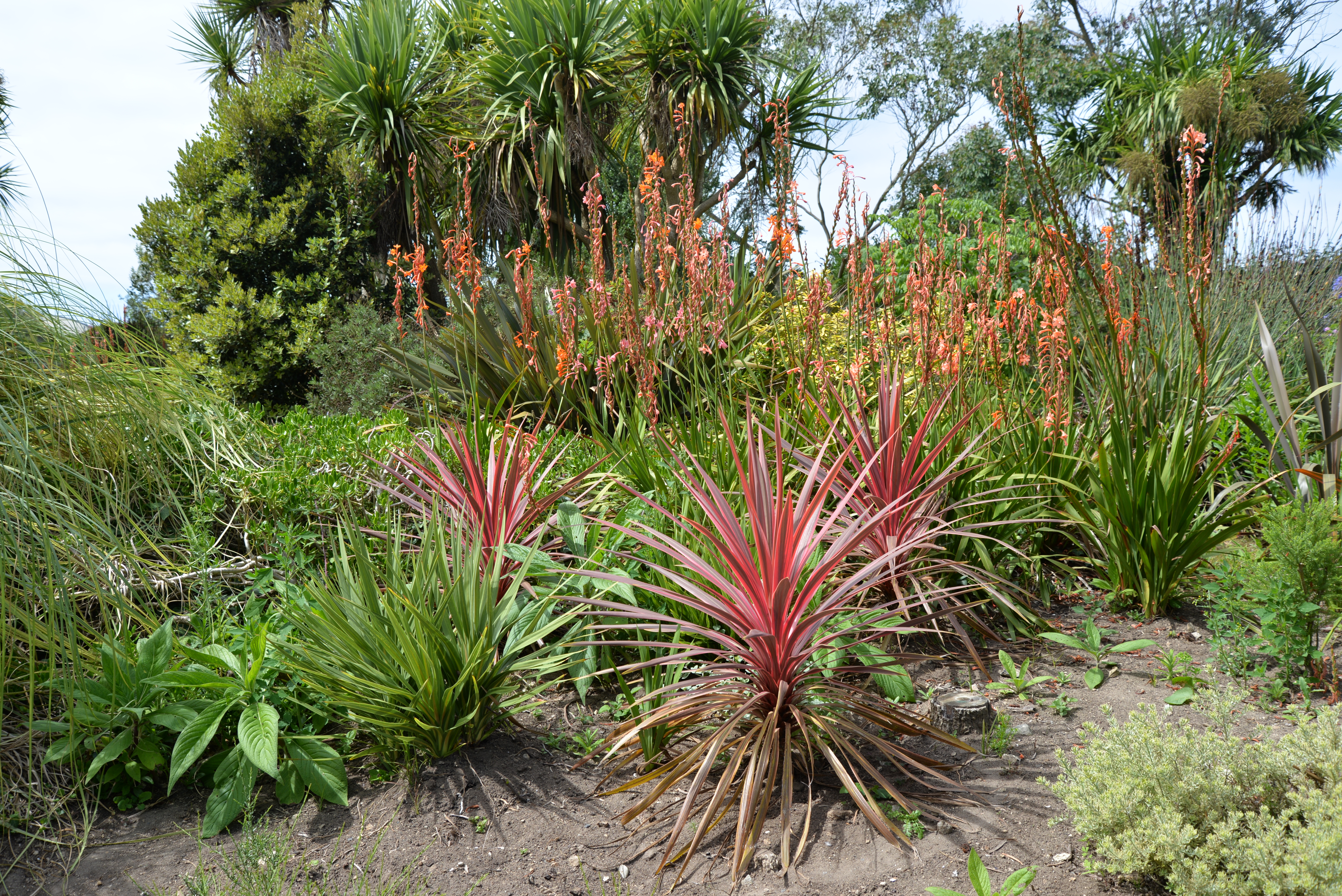

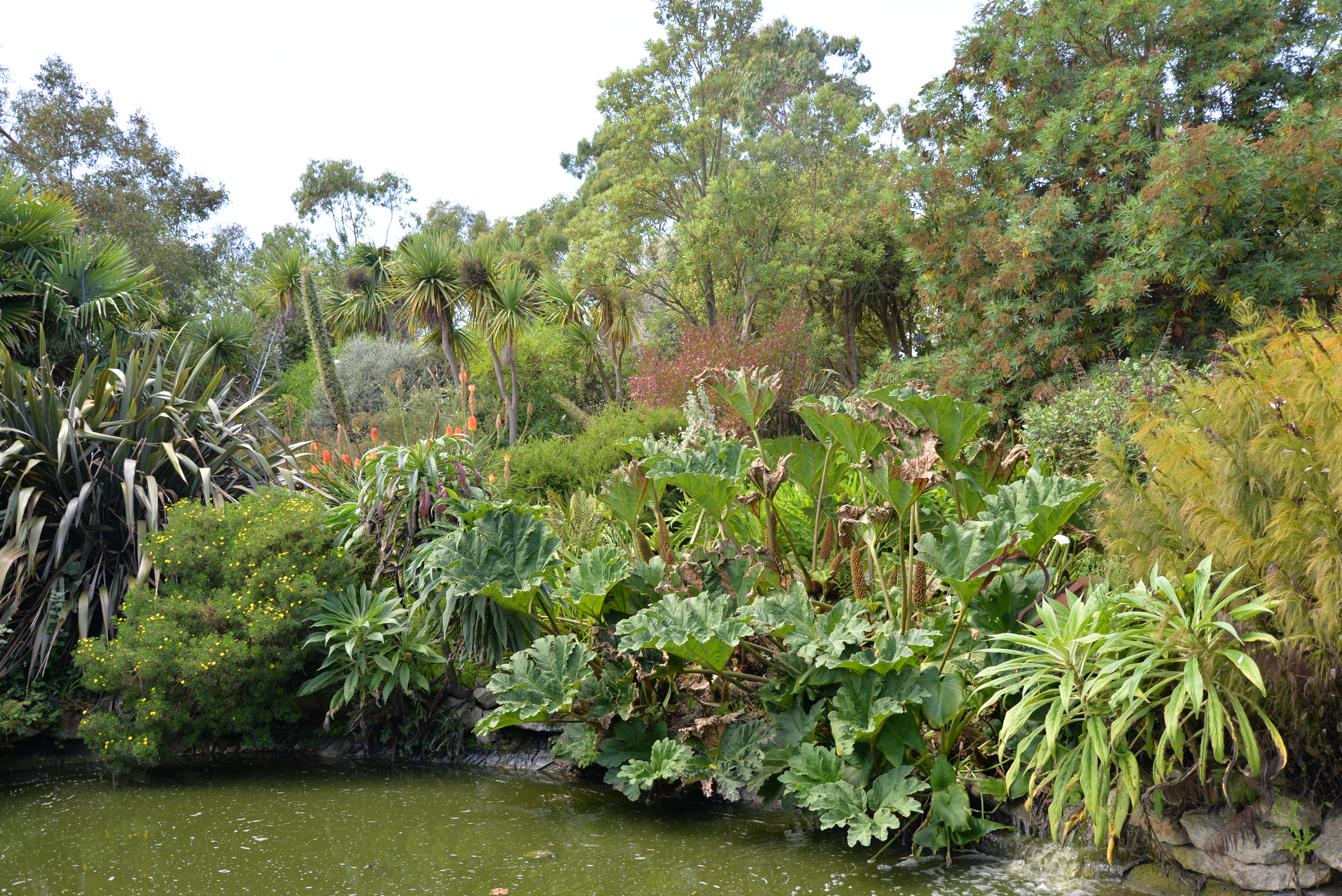

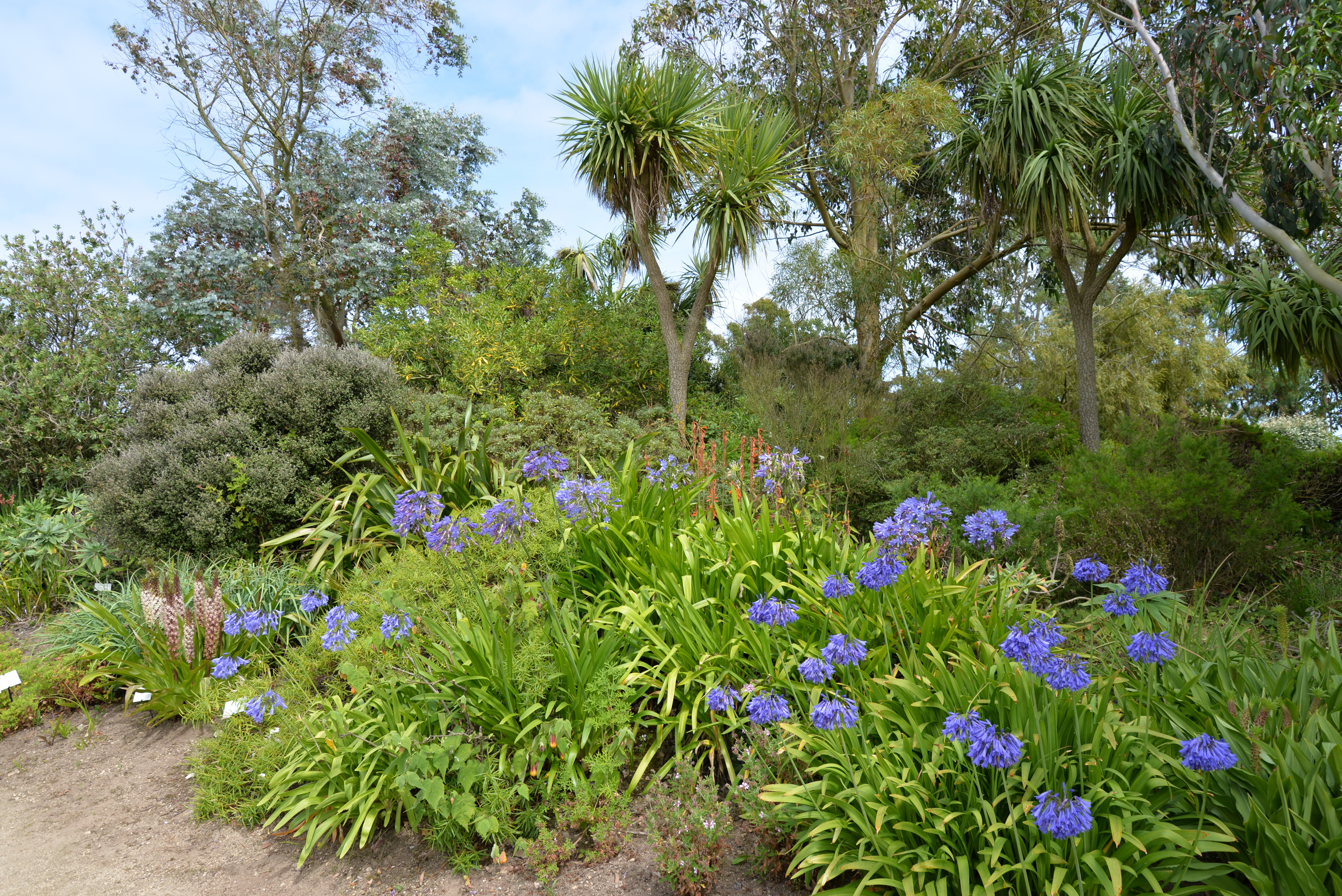

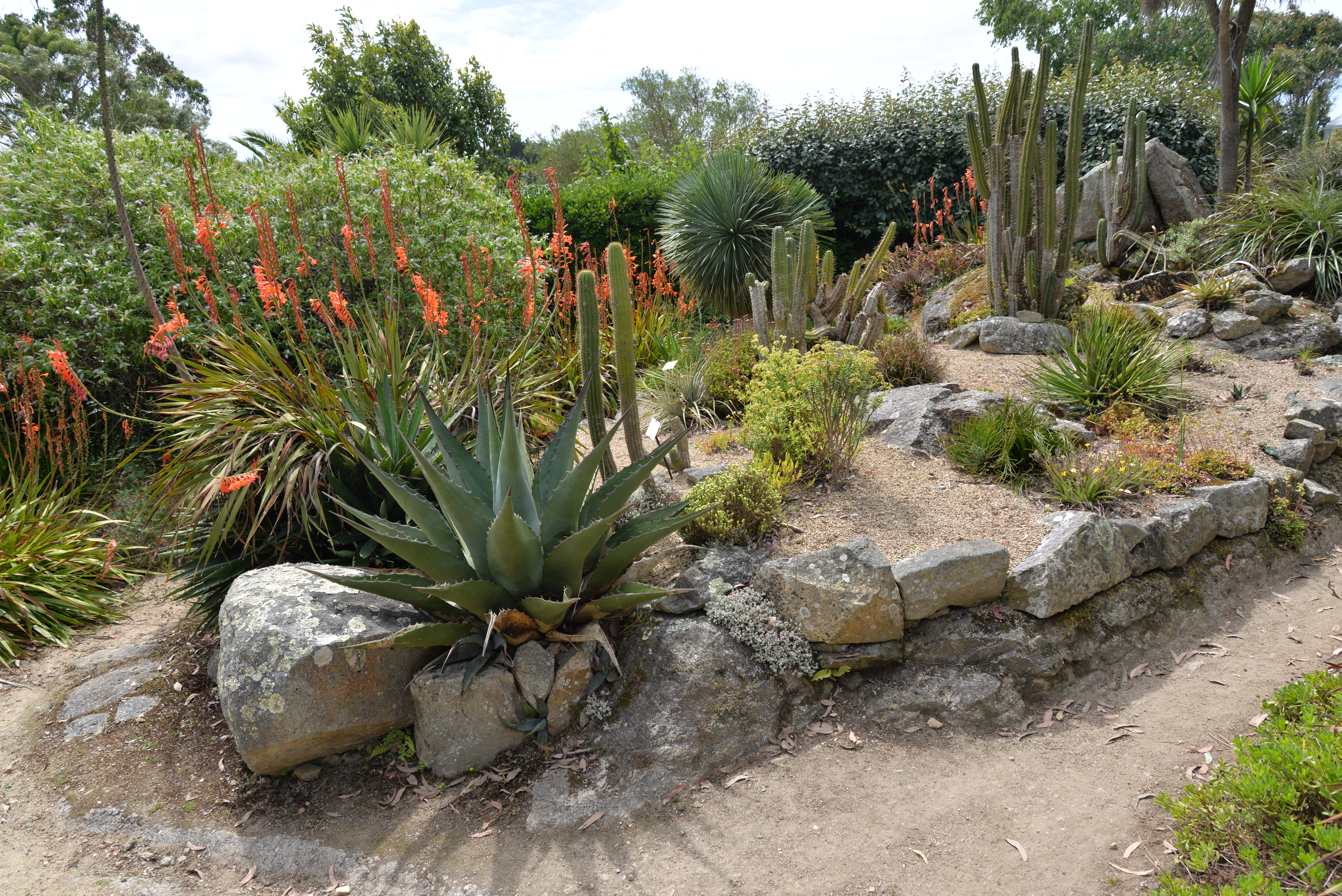

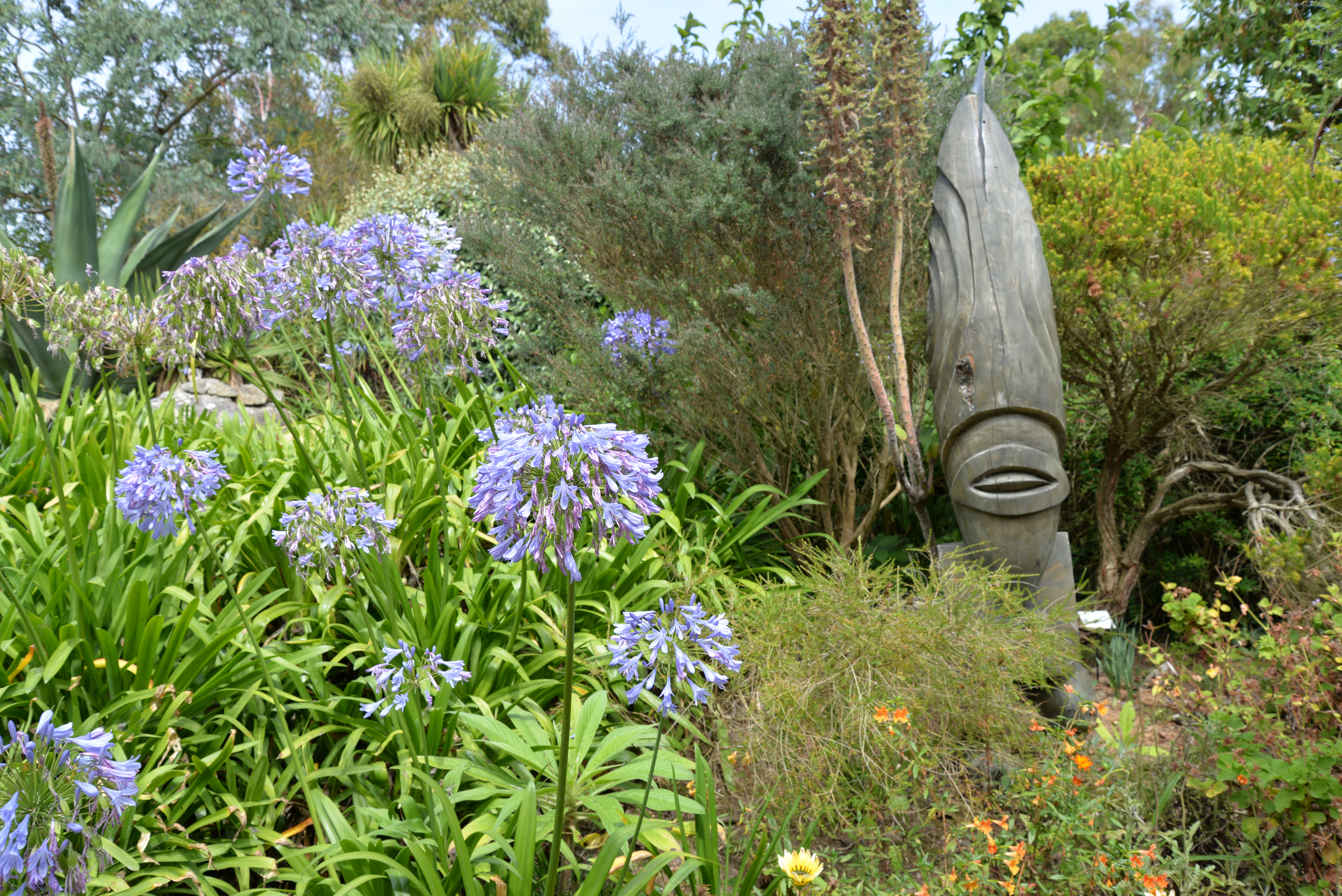

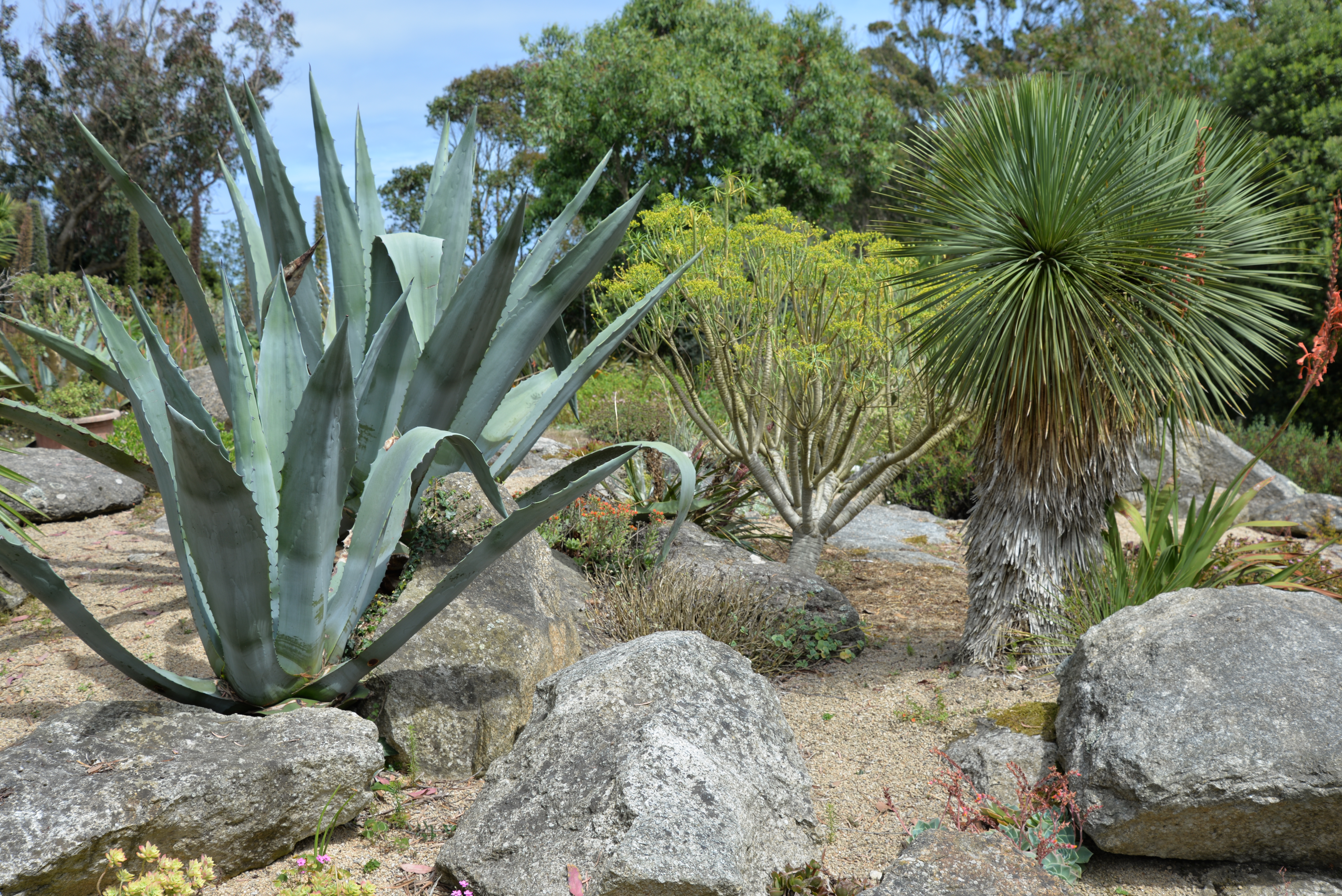

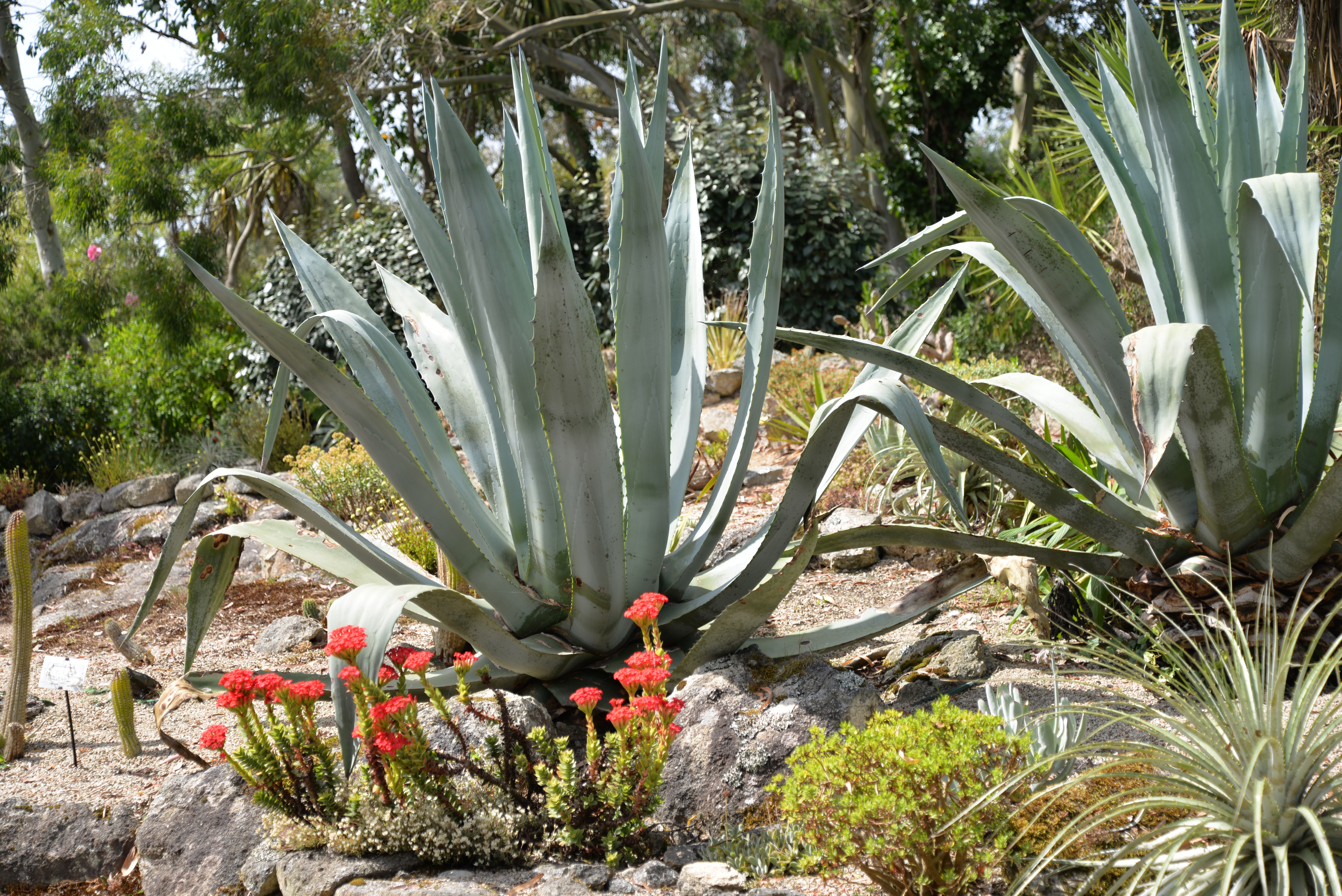

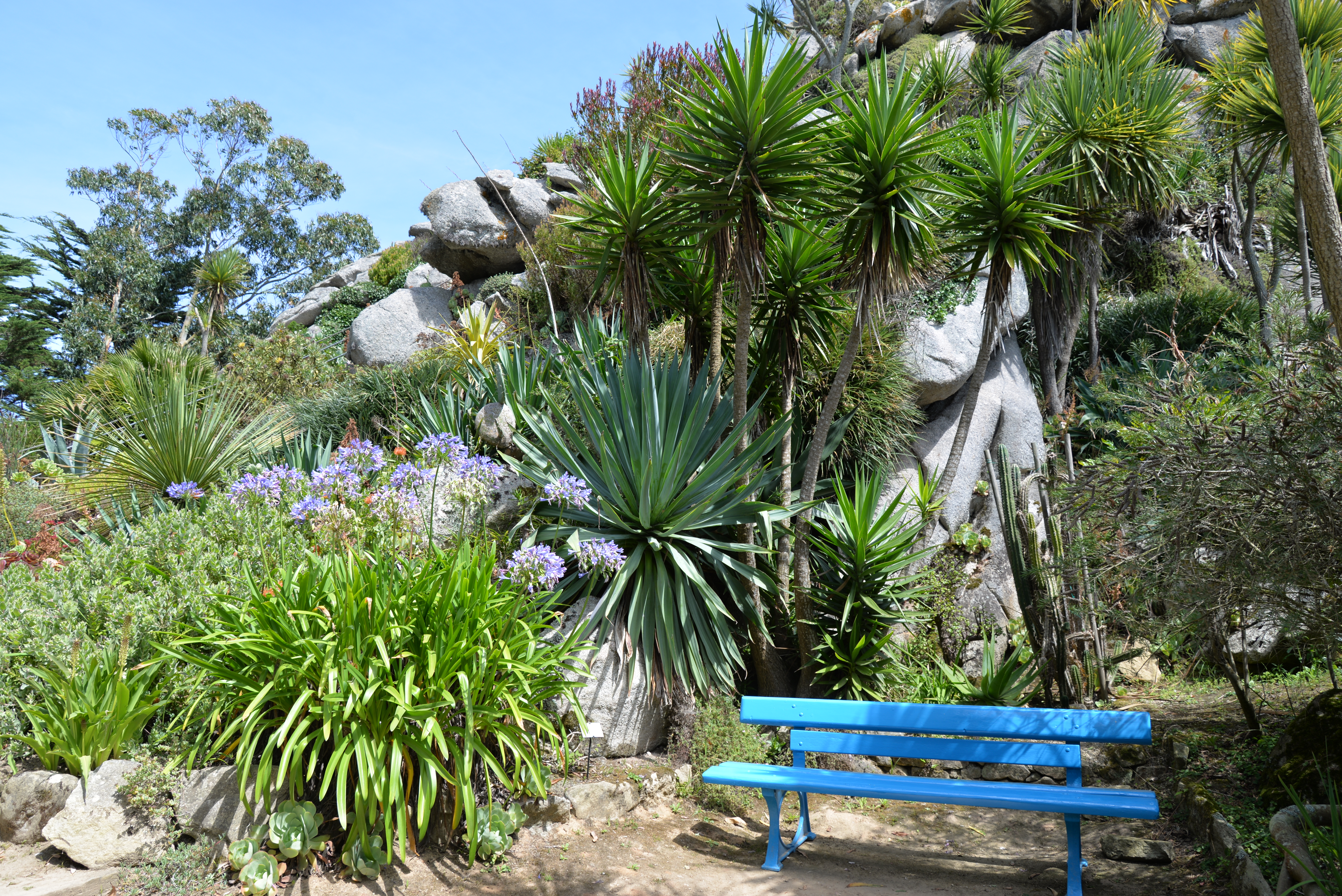
- The Onion Johnny museum

== Population ==
Inhabitants of Roscoff are called in French Roscovites.

Historical population
Year	Pop.	±% p.a.
1968	3,339	—
1975	3,404	+0.28%
1982	3,581	+0.73%
1990	3,711	+0.45%
1999	3,550	−0.49%
2007	3,675	+0.43%
2012	3,515	−0.89%
2017	3,404	−0.64%
2023	3,334	−0.35%
Source: INSEE

== Breton language ==
The municipality launched a language plan through Ya d'ar brezhoneg on 14 November 2008.

In 2008 18.44% of primary-school children attended bilingual schools.

== Ferries ==
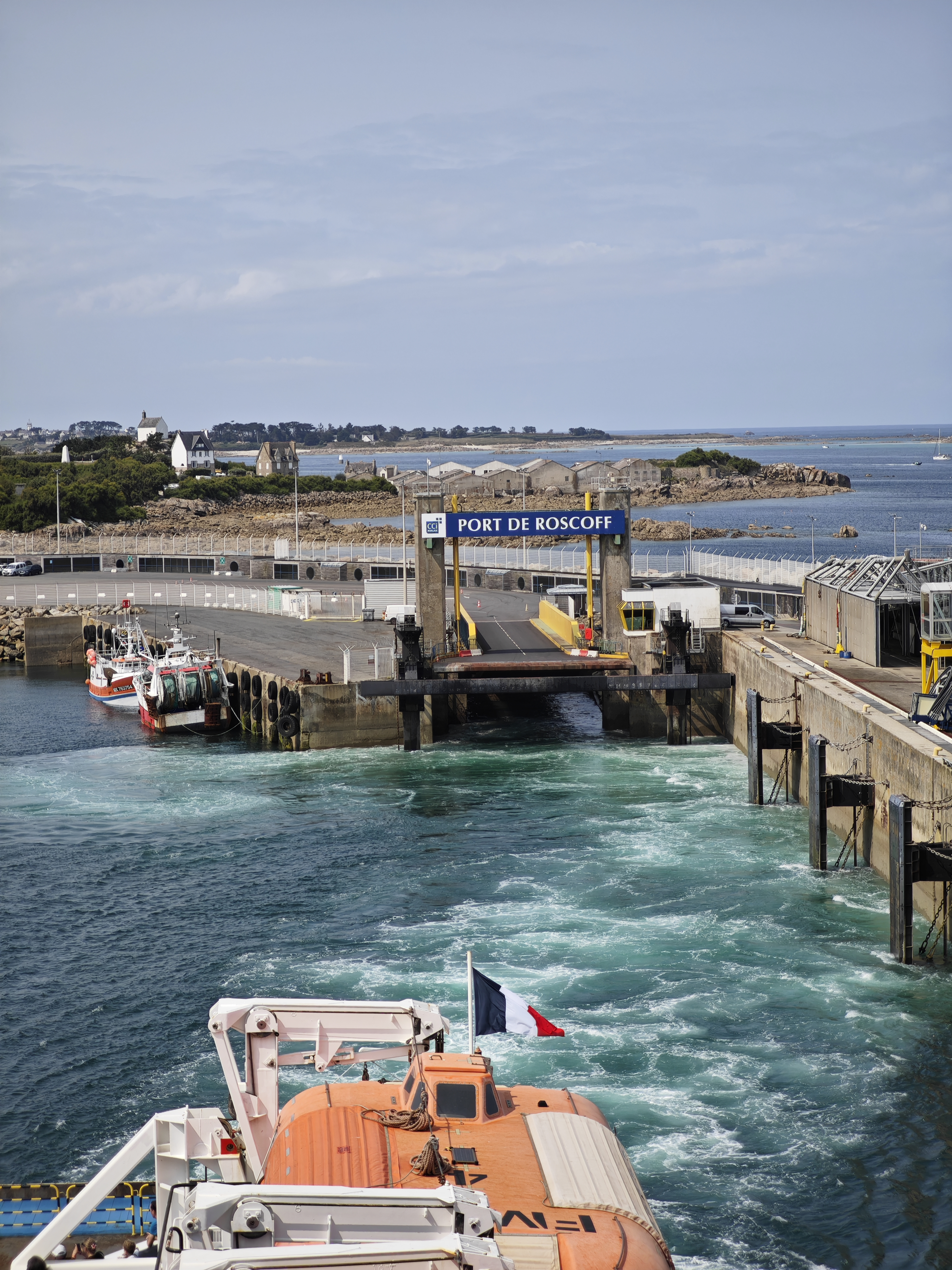
A ferry departs Roscoff port

Brittany Ferries operate ferry services from Roscoff to Plymouth daily from February to September with occasional Christmas sailings, to Cork twice a week (Friday and Tuesday service).

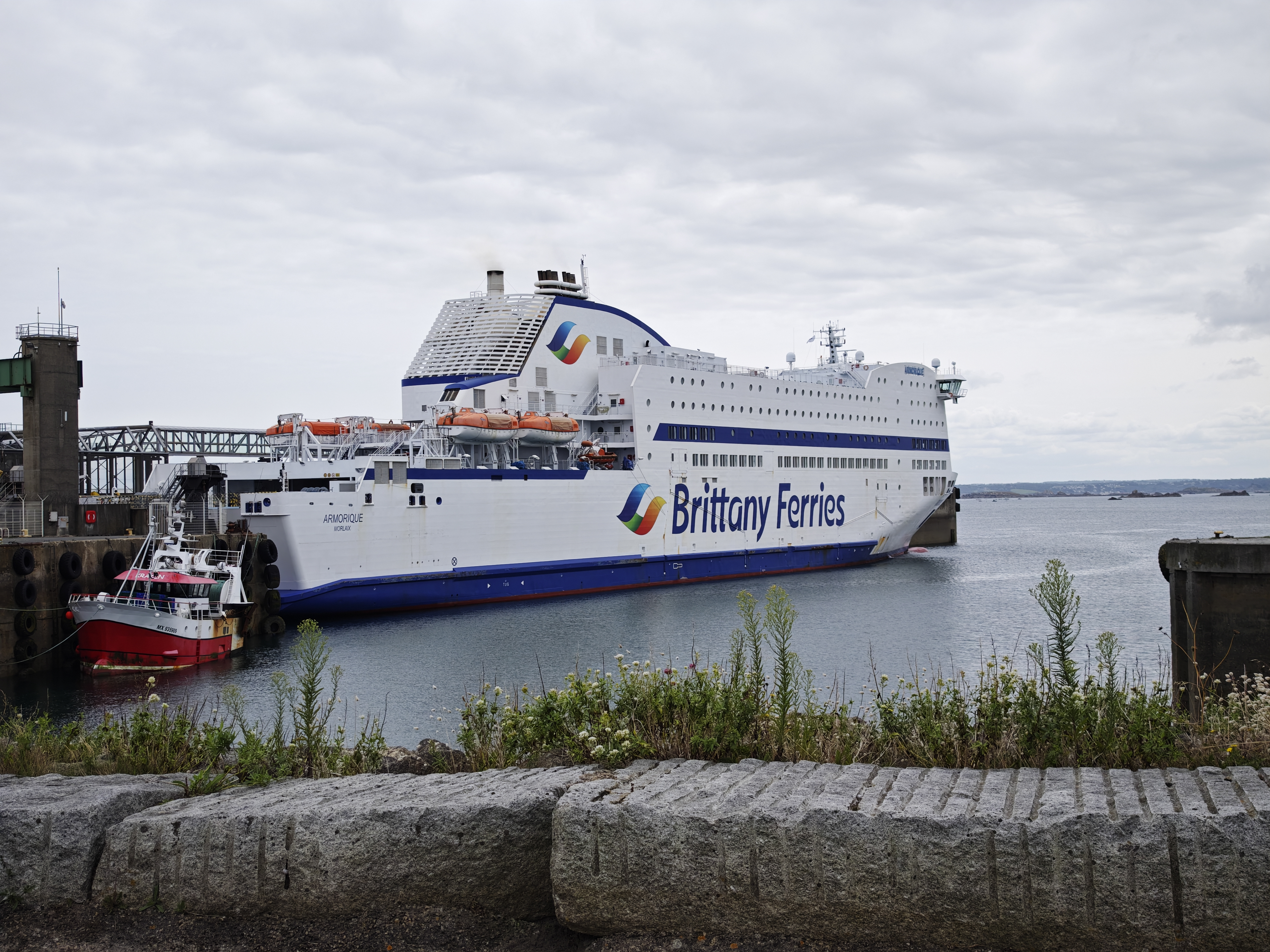
Brittany Ferries Armorique at the Harbor

Irish Ferries used to operate a ferry service from Roscoff to Rosslare from May to September but now sail to Cherbourg instead.

Preceding station	Ferry	Following station
Terminus	Brittany Ferries; Ferry	Plymouth
Terminus	Brittany Ferries; Ferry	Cork

== Historic events ==
- In 1375 the harbour was destroyed by English forces under the Earl of Arundel. It would later be rebuilt at its current location, Kroas Batz.
- From 1522 to 1545–1550 the construction the Church of Our Lady of Kroas Batz (see Monuments above).
- In 1548 the six-year-old Mary, Queen of Scots, having been betrothed to the Dauphin François, disembarked at Roscoff en route from Scotland.
- In 1790 Roscoff was raised to independent commune. Until then the town had effectively depended on Saint-Pol-de-Léon.
- The illustrator Henry Gerbault and his wife moved to Roscoff in 1919 and lived there for the rest of their lives.

== Notable people ==
- Henri Gerbault (1863–1930), illustrator
- Georges Teissier (1900–1972), mathematical biologist

== International relations ==
Roscoff is twinned with:

- Great Torrington, United Kingdom
- Auxerre, France

== Image gallery ==
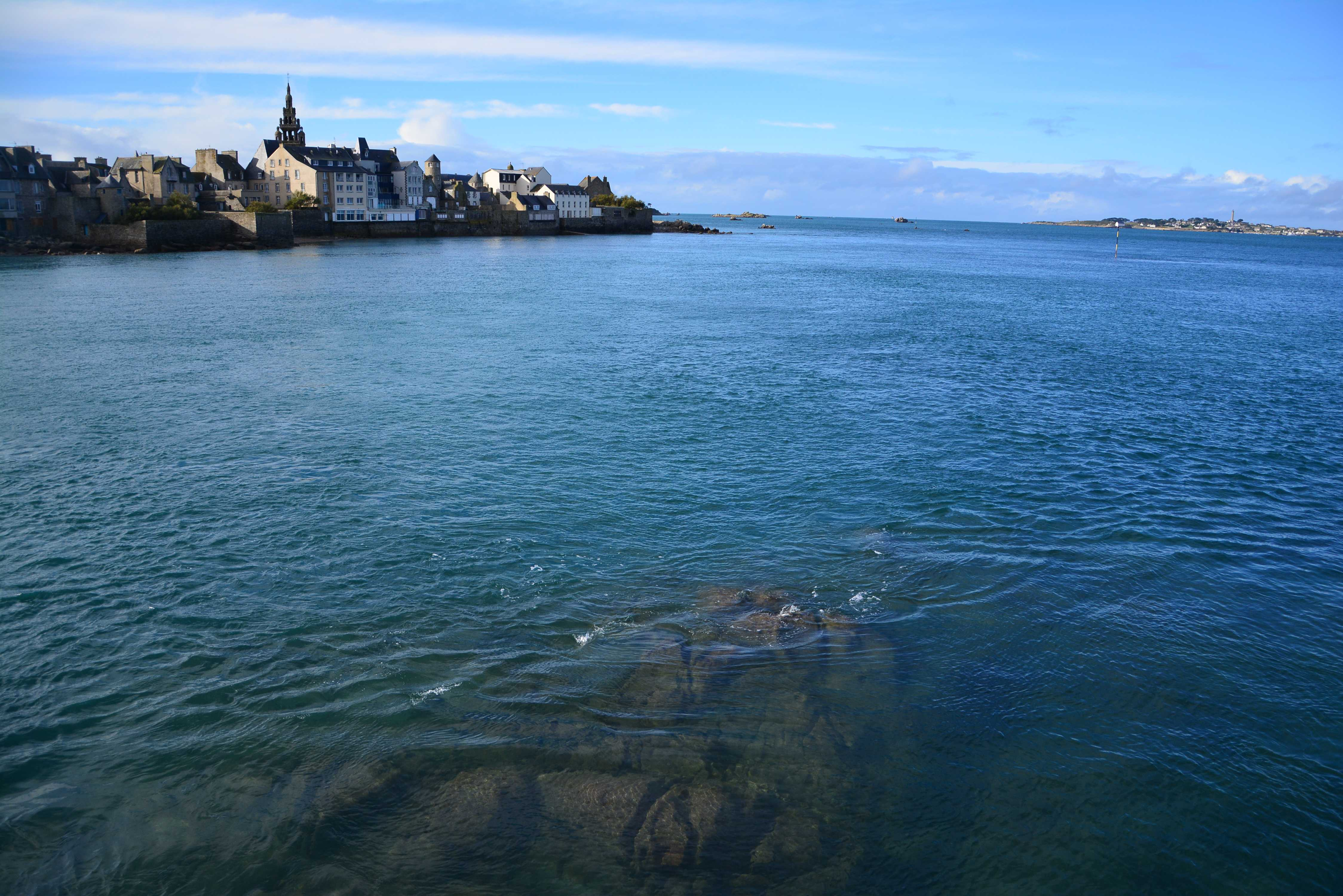
Roscoff from the pier

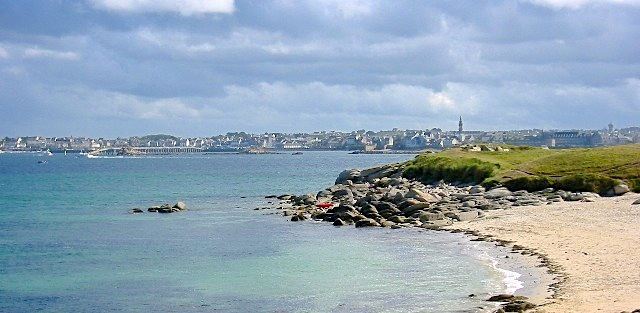
View of Roscoff from Île-de-Batz

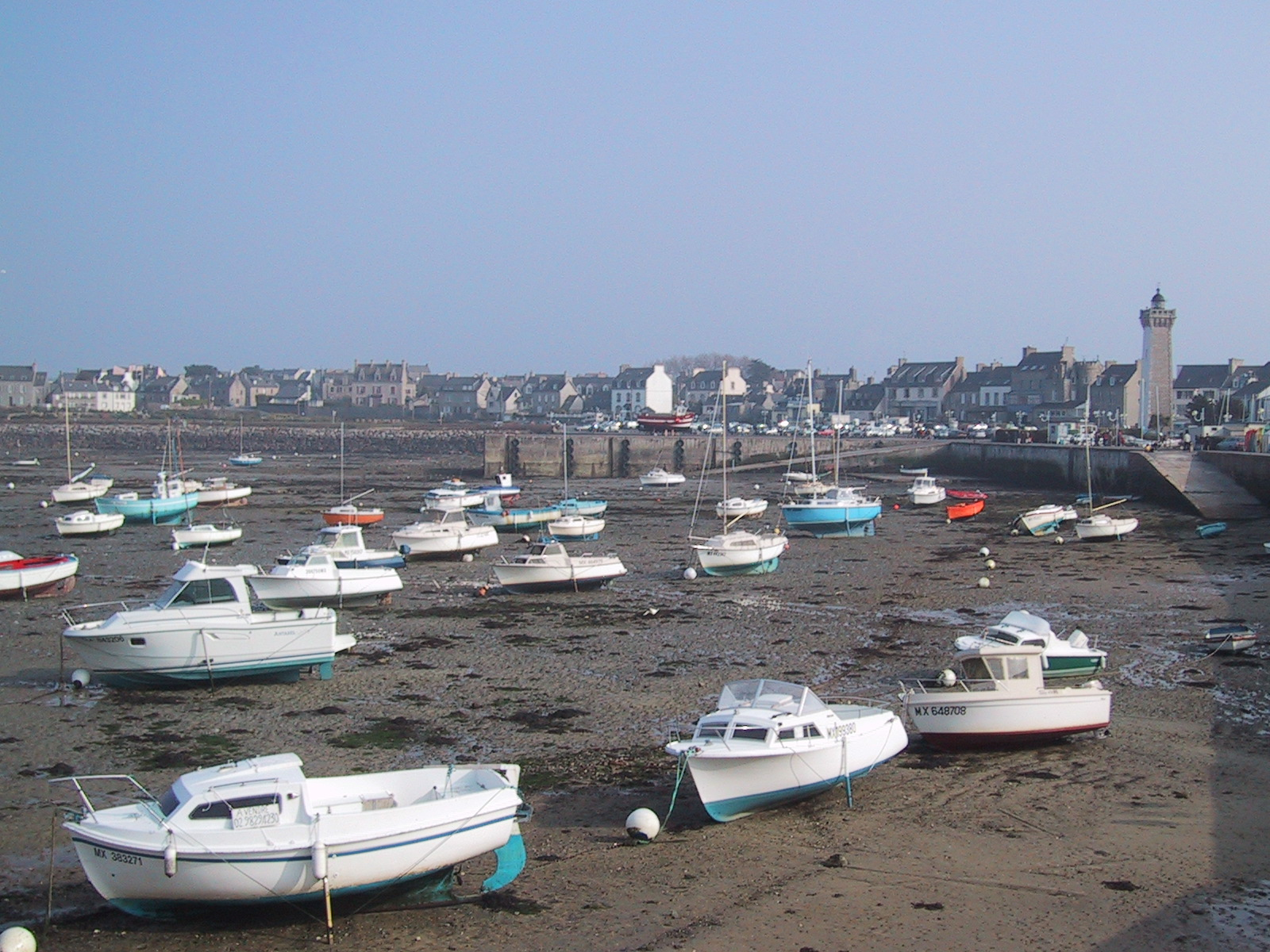
Boats at low tide in Roscoff

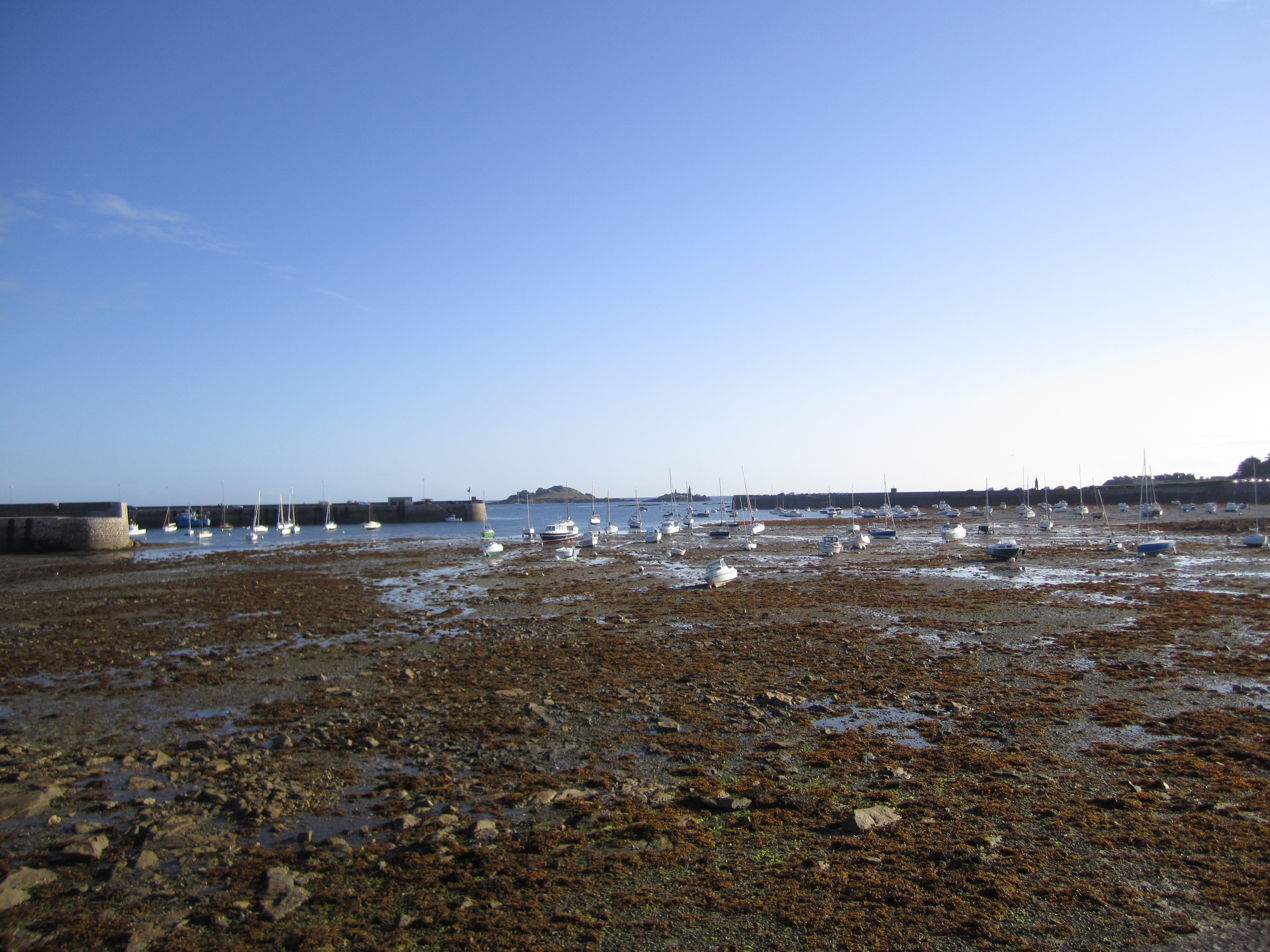
Roscoff Harbour at low tide

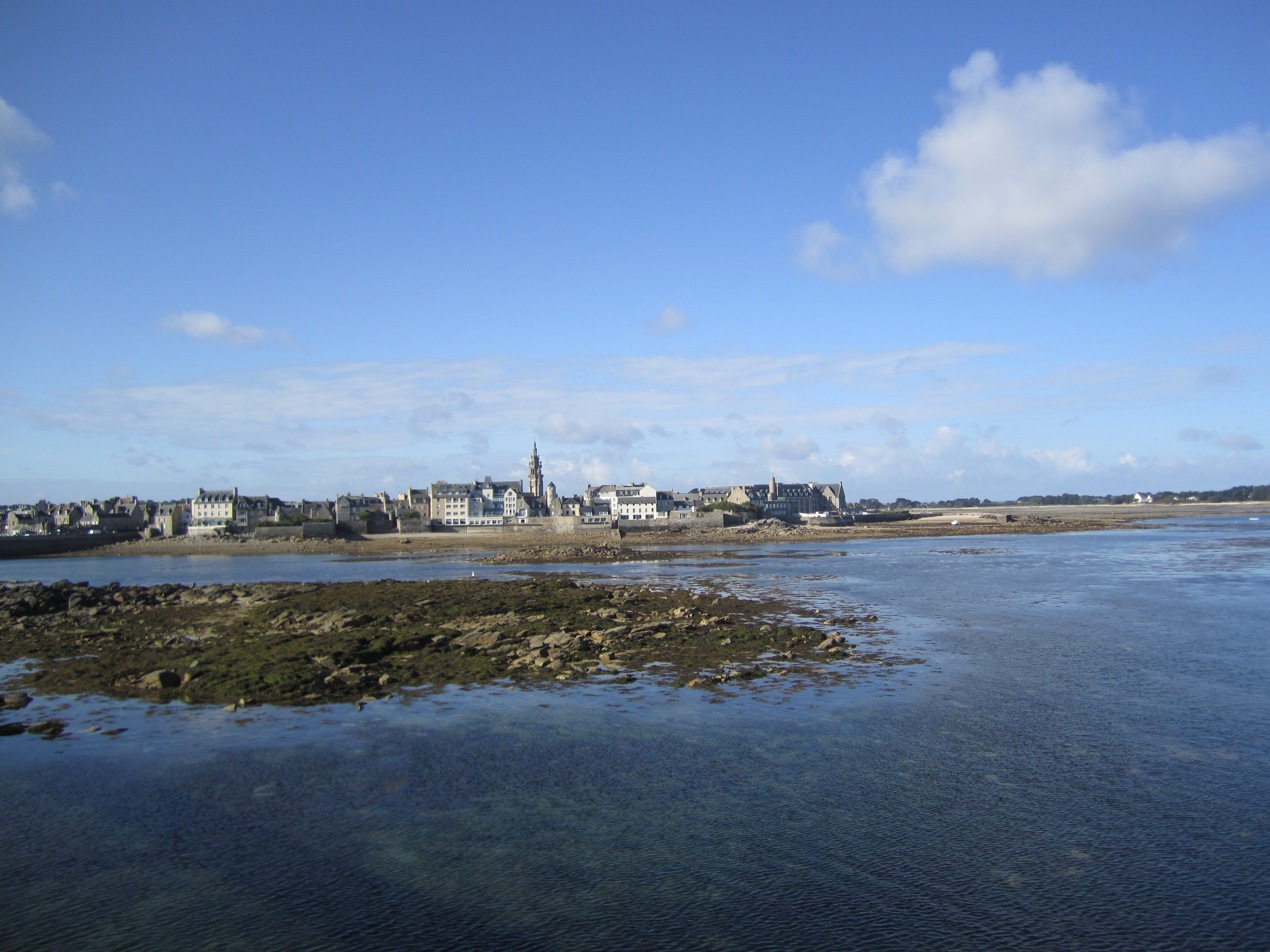
Roscoff from Bridge to the ferry to Île-de-Batz at low tide

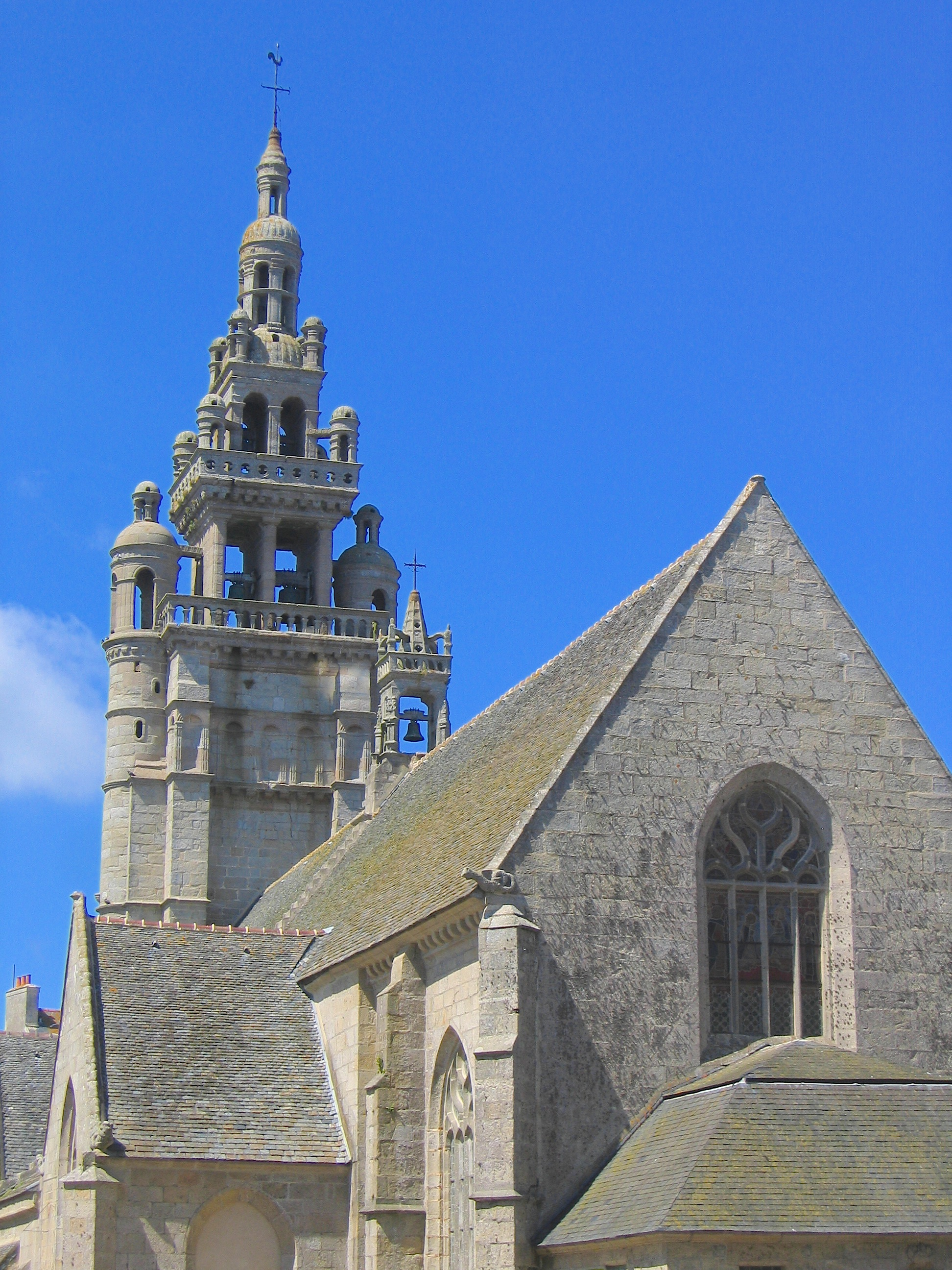
The Renaissance spire (1576) of Roscoff parish church Our Lady of Croaz Batz

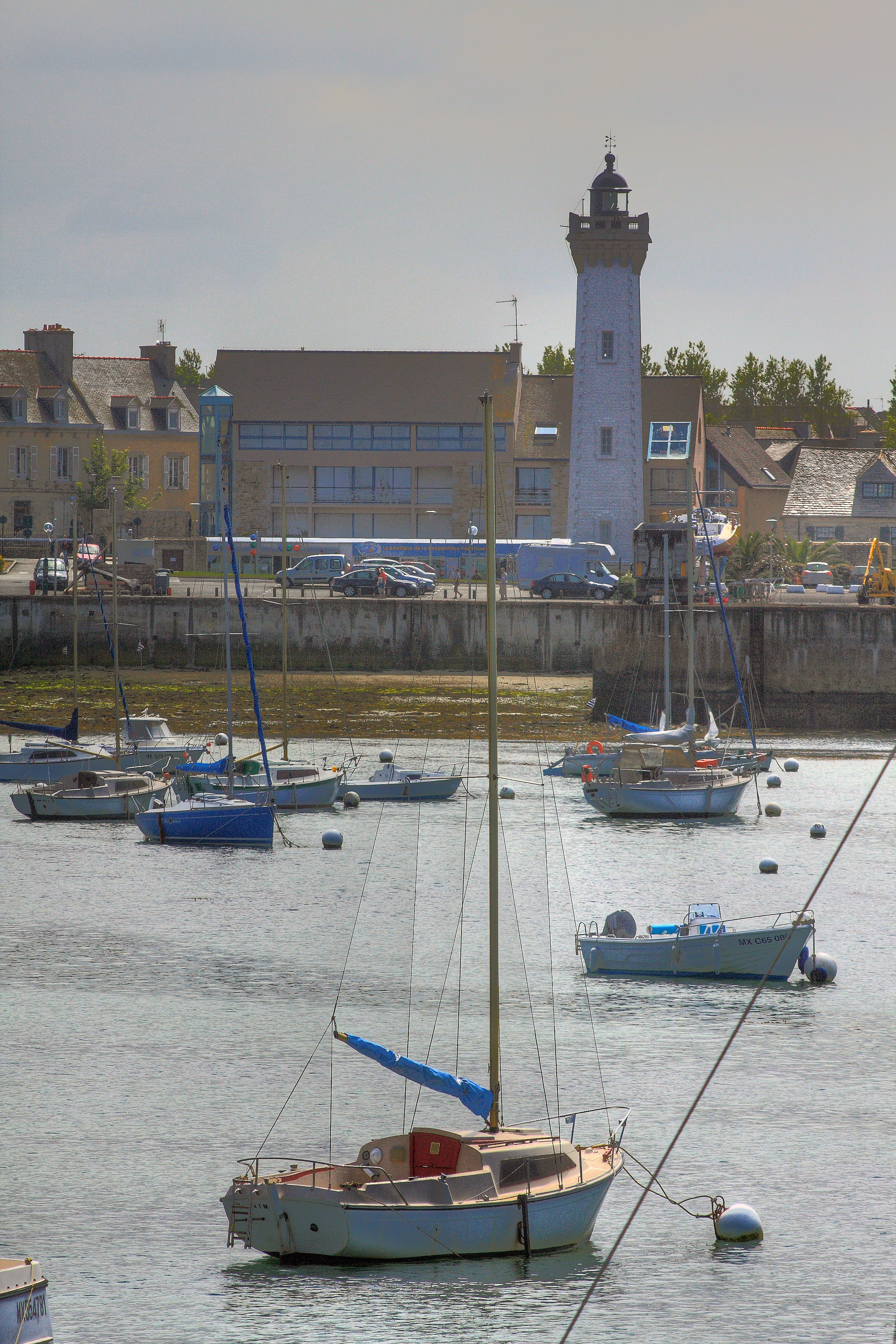
The lighthouse

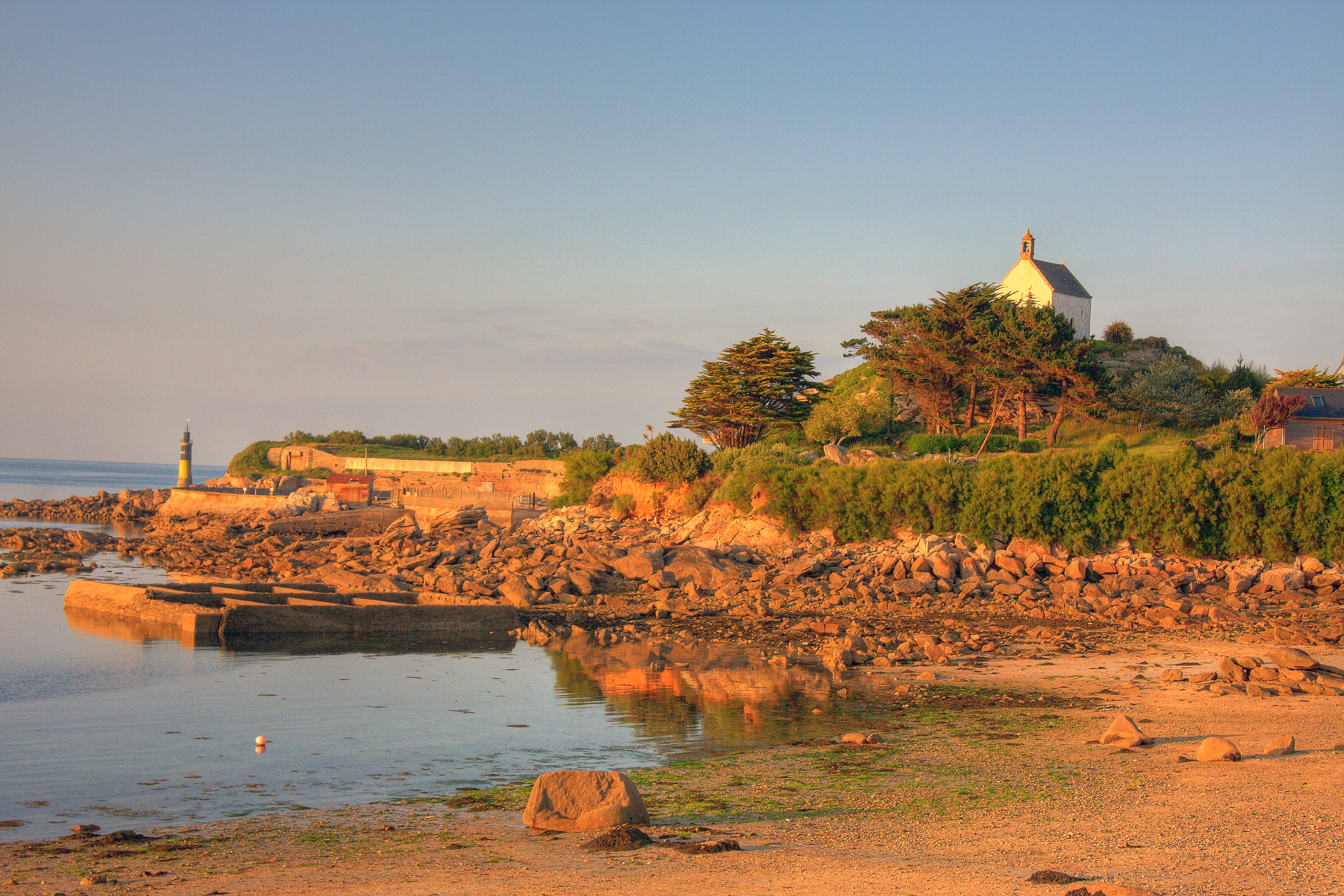
Sainte Barbe chapel

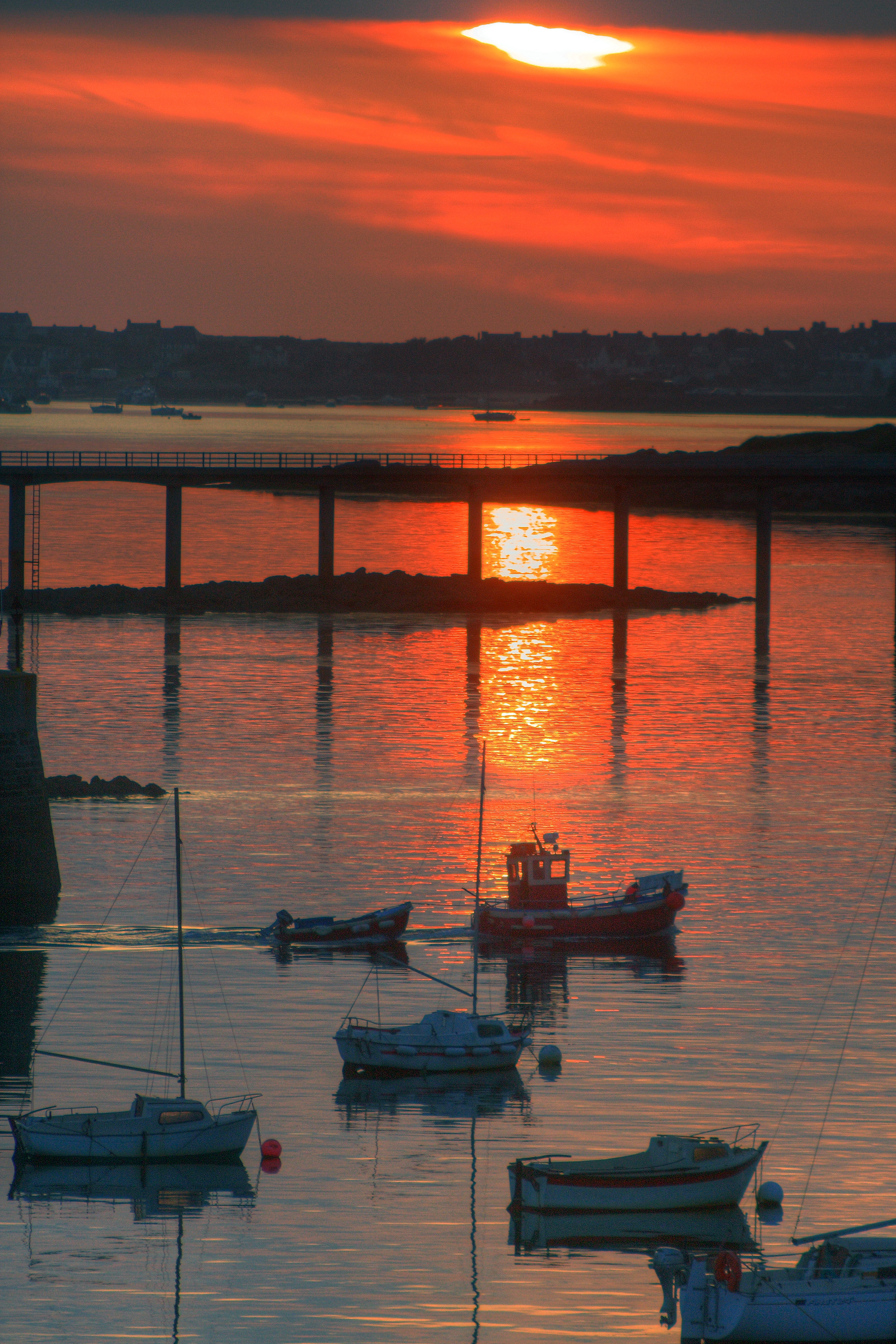

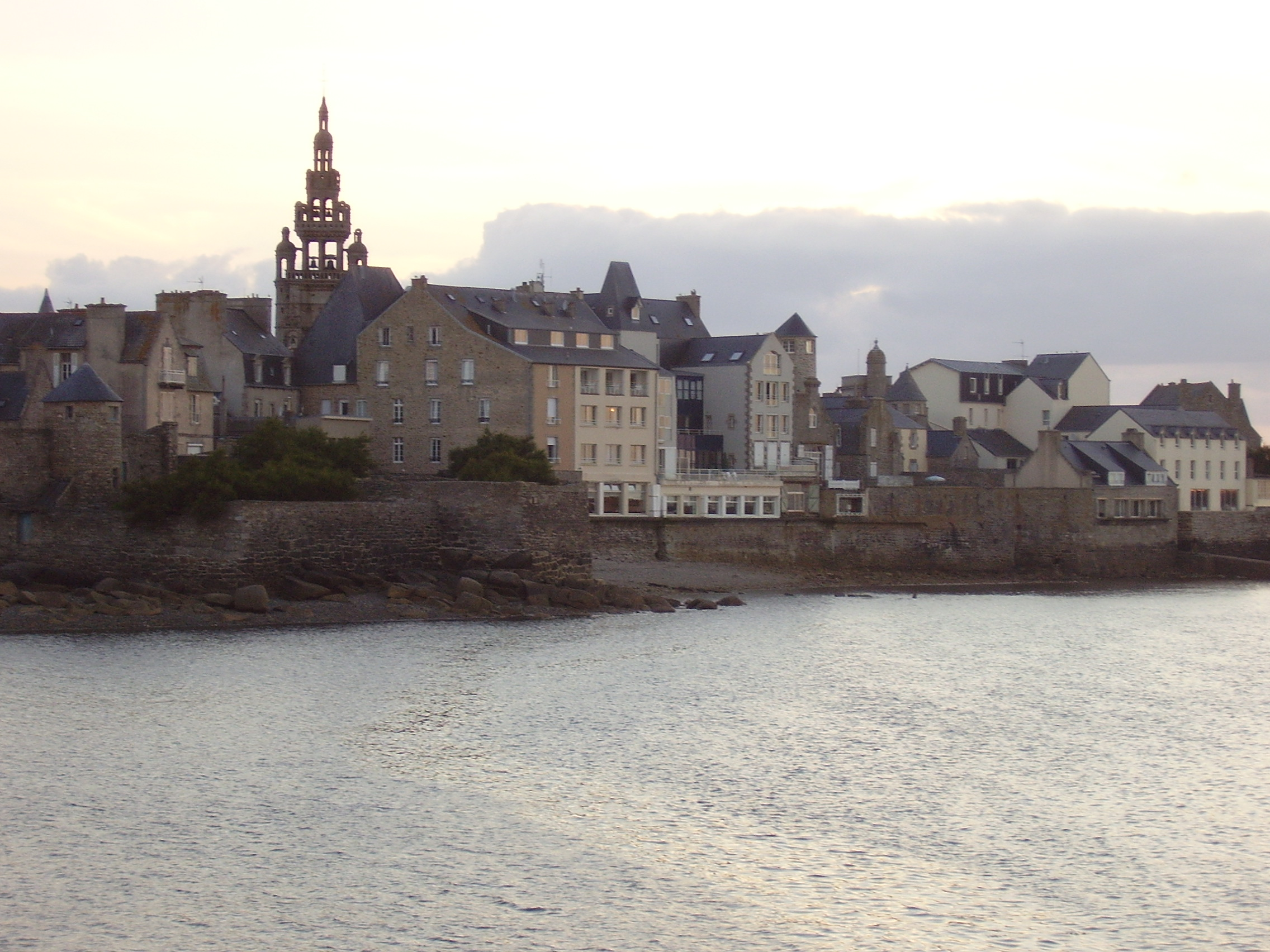
Ar Vil from the sea

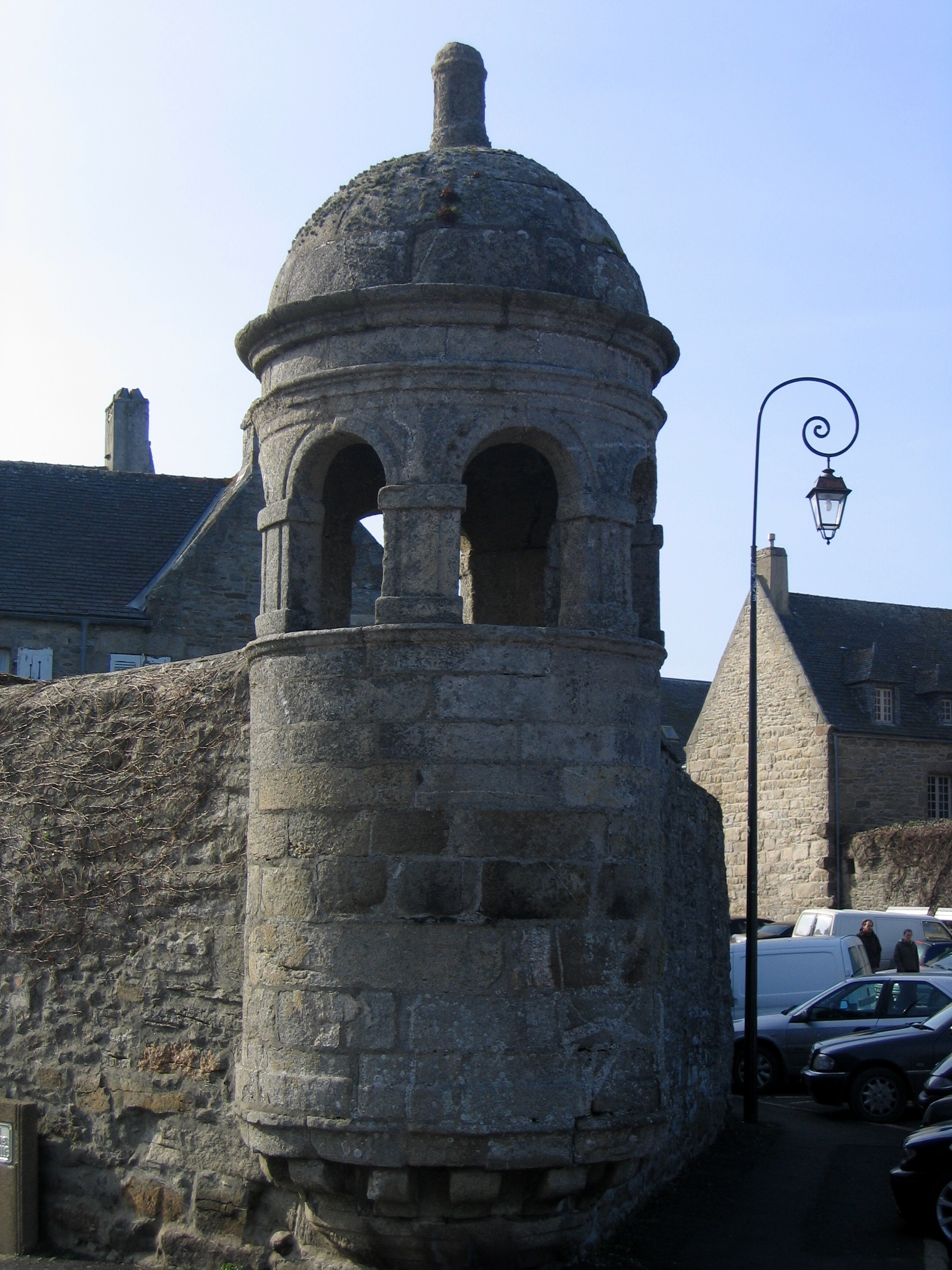

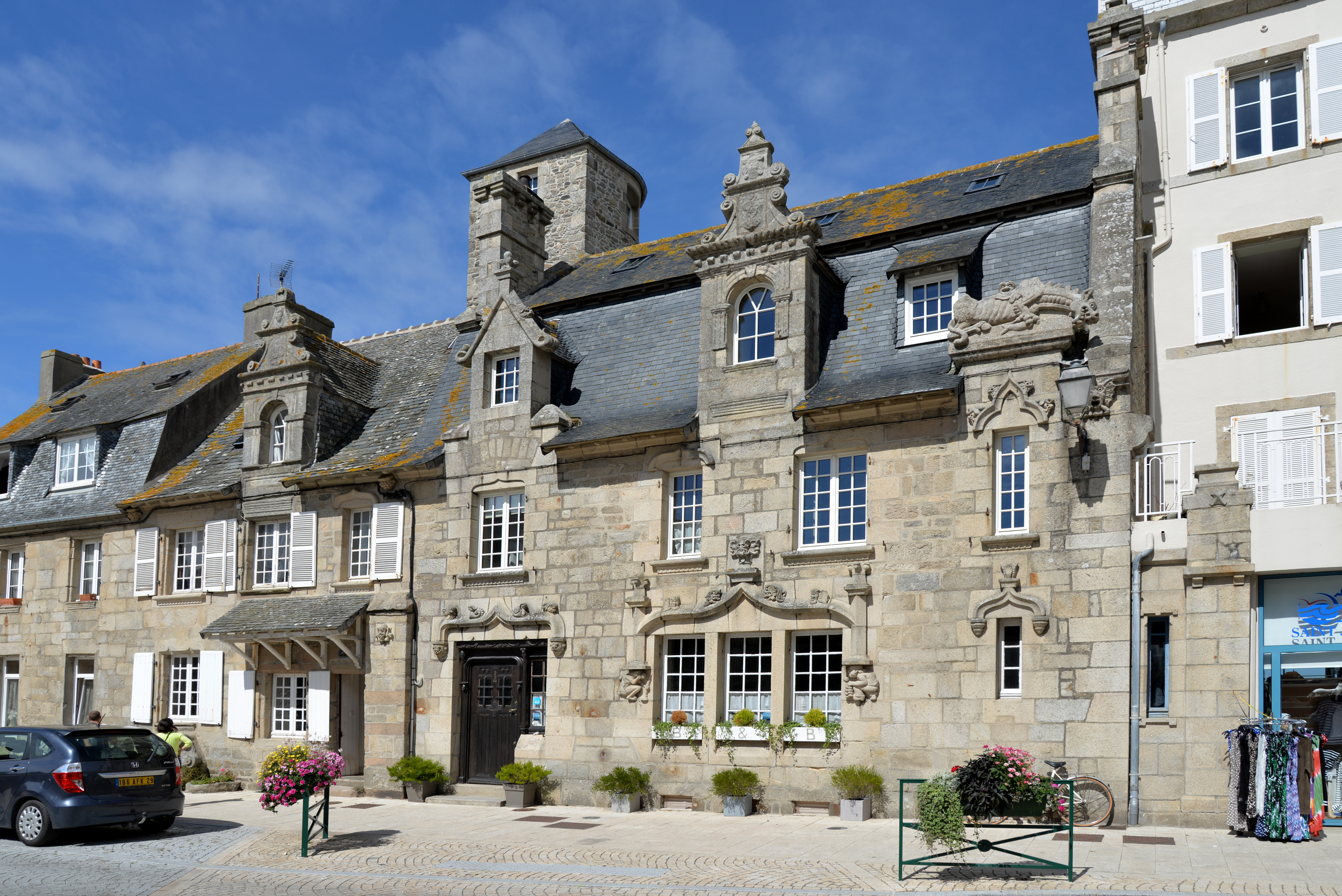

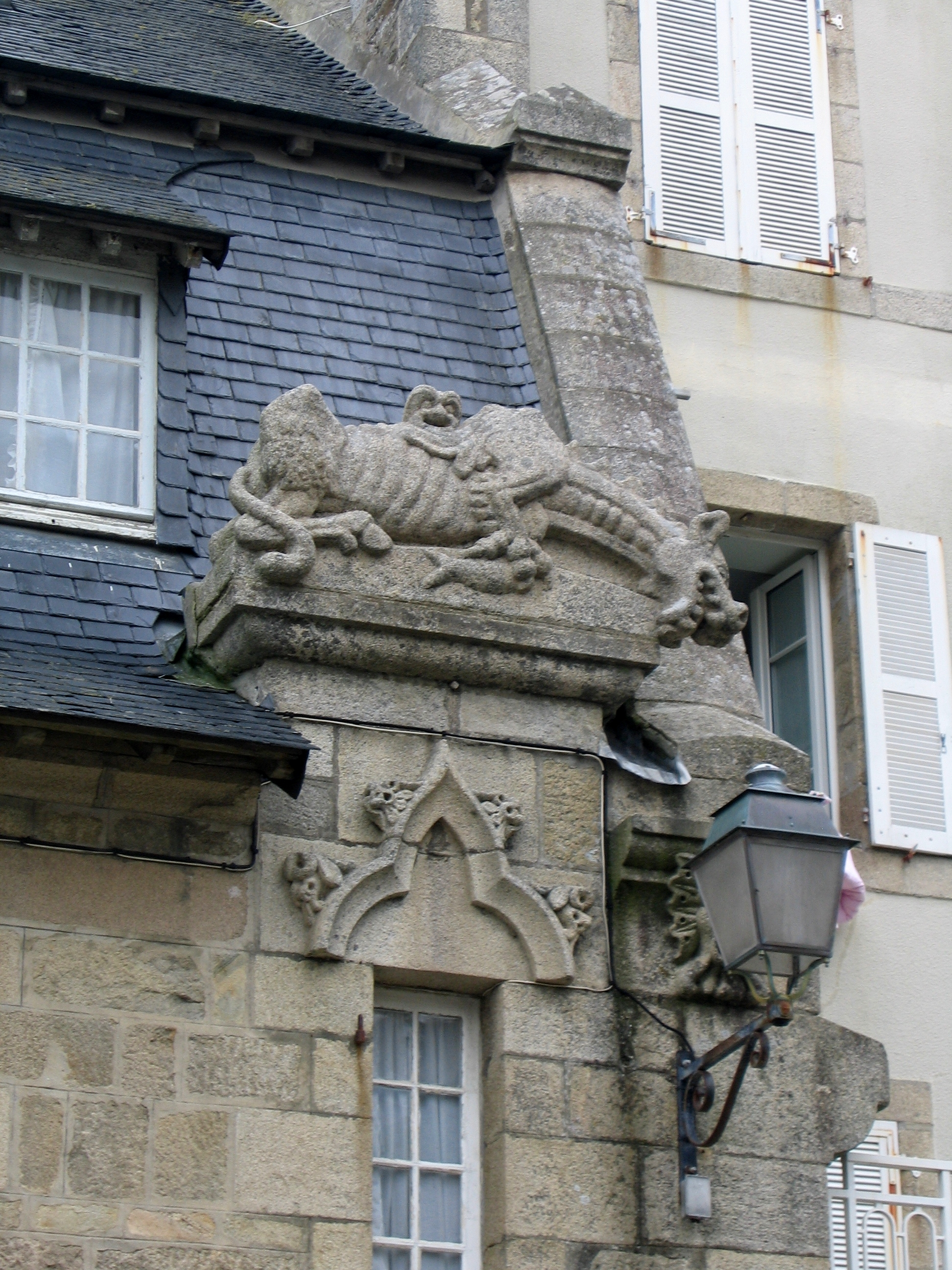

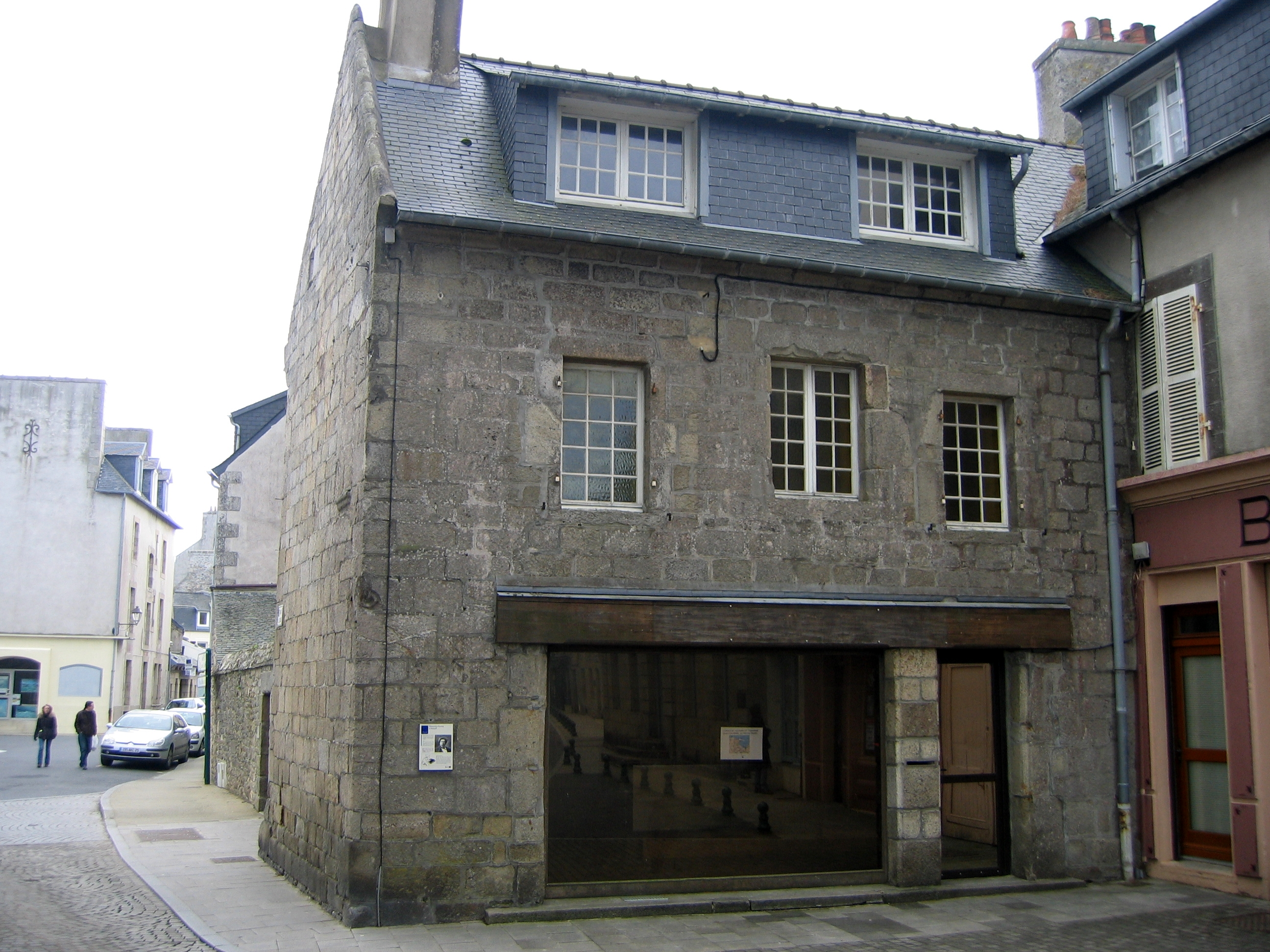
Alexandre Dumas's house during the summer 1869.

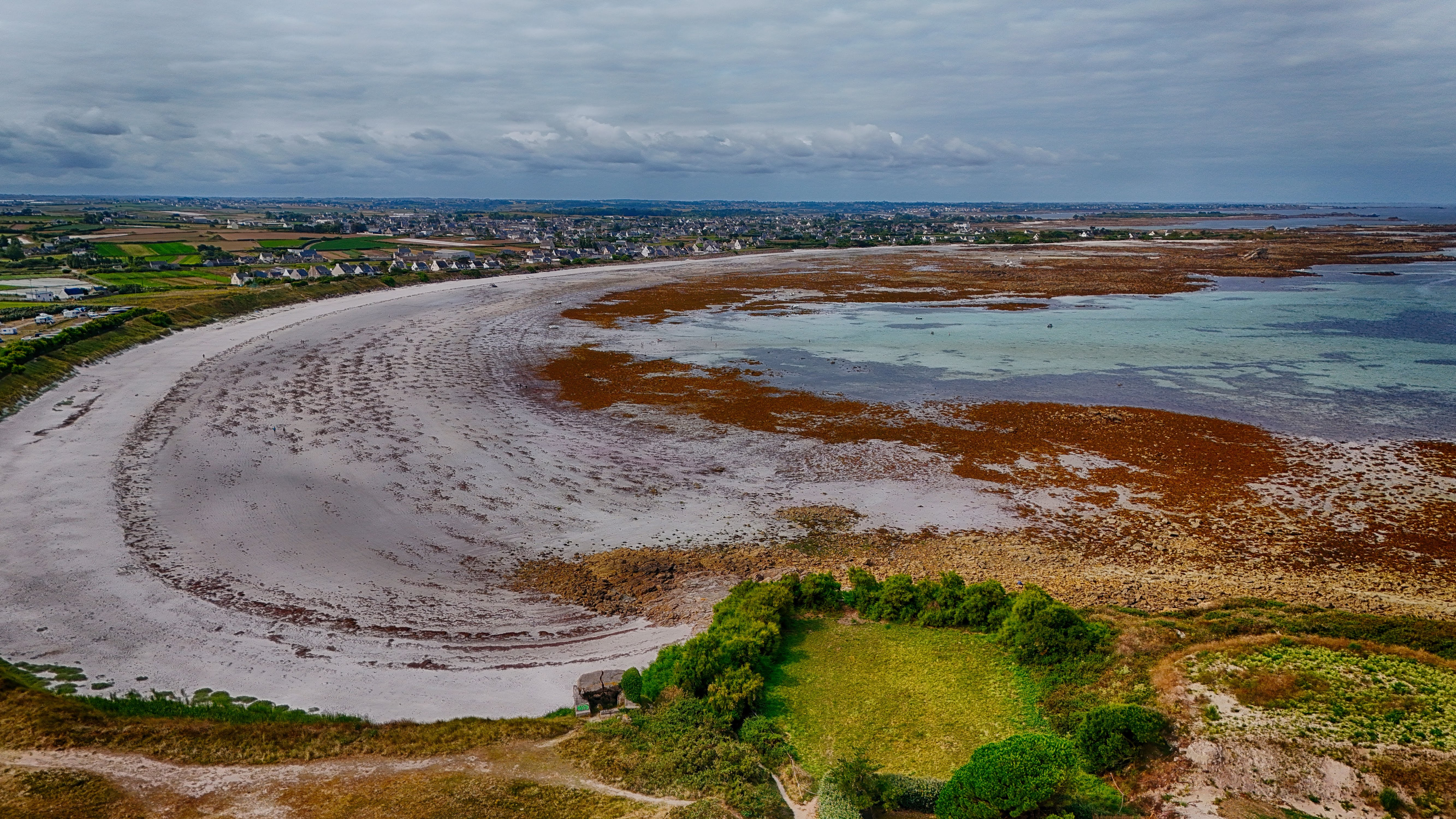

== See also ==
- Communes of the Finistère department
