= Jon (disambiguation) =

Jon is a shortened form of the name Jonathan.

Jon or JON may also refer to:

== People ==
- Jon, a masculine given name
- Jón, an Old Norse common name still widely used in Iceland and the Faroes
- Jon (Korean surname) (Korean: 전), also transliterated Jeon
- Jon (Serer surname)

== Other uses ==
- Jon (film), a 1983 Finnish film
- Jon Arbuckle, a Garfield Character
- JBoss Operations Network, network management software

== See also ==
- Jons (disambiguation)
- John (disambiguation)
- Jonny (disambiguation)
