= Hildeprand =

King of the Lombards from 735 to 744

- King of the Lombards
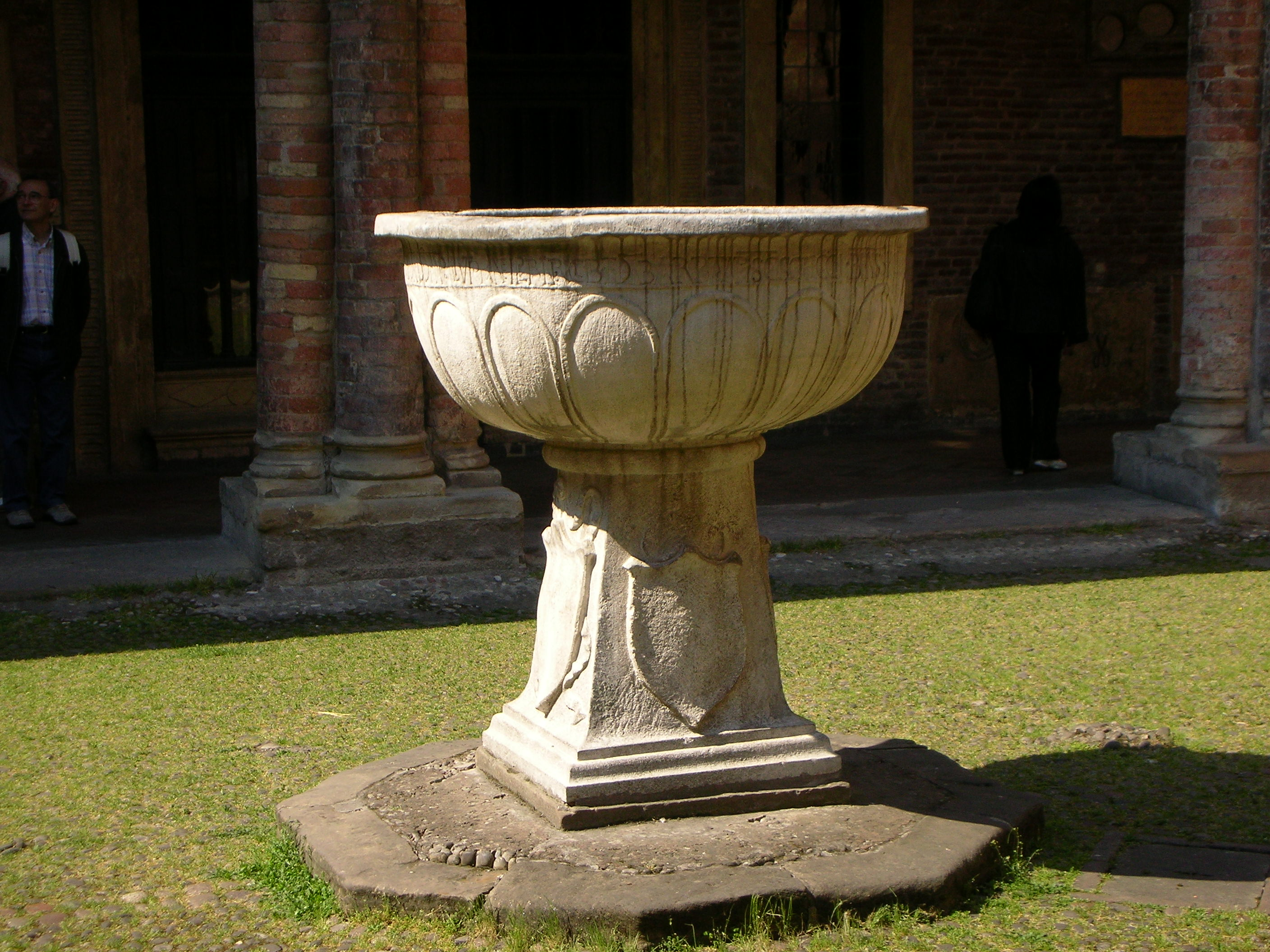
- The so-called "Pilatus' basin" in Santo Stefano, Bologna, mentioning both Liutprand and Hildeprand
- Reign: 744
- Predecessor: Liutprand
- Successor: Ratchis
- Regent: Liutprand (734–744)
- Died: after 744

Hildeprand (died after 744), sometimes called the Useless, was the king of the Lombards from around 735 in association with his uncle, Liutprand. After Liutprand's death in 744, Hildeprand ruled in his own name until he was overthrown later that year by Ratchis, duke of Friuli.

The son of Sigiprand, duke of Asti, Hildeprand was also a duke (dux) prior to his elevation to the throne. In 734, he participated in the successful siege of Byzantine Ravenna. Either just before or after the siege, Liutprand fell ill and was not expected to live. The leading Lombard noblemen elected Hildeprand as king, but Liutprand recovered. Although displeased with the election, he felt bound to accept Hildeprand as co-ruler. Liutprand himself had been elected while his father Ansprand, was fatally ill. In both cases, the initiative to elect a successor was taken by the nobility. By 735, the diplomacy of Pope Gregory II had patched together an alliance between the Byzantine exarch, Eutychius, Duke Ursus of Venetia and Patriarch Antoninus of Grado. With a large Venetian fleet, the new allies retook Ravenna. In this second siege, Hildeprand and Duke Peredeo of Vicenza were captured by the Venetians, according to the Chronicon Venetum.

In 739, while Liutprand was campaigning against the church in the Duchy of Rome, Hildeprand was ravaging the ecclesiastical lands around Ravenna. In August, he was joined by Liutprand, who attacked the Pentapolis. By 743, Liutprand's health had again begun to fail, and there may have arisen a pro-papal party in the kingdom, led by Duke Ratchis. The next year Liutprand died and Hildeprand succeeded unopposed, being elected in Pavia, near the church of Santa Maria delle Pertiche, in the presence of the Lombard army. He had proved himself an opponent of both the Byzantines and the Papacy, and within a few months he was overthrown by a revolt led by Ratchis, who immediately made peace with Pope Zachary.

== Sources ==
- Grierson, Philip (1941). "Election and Inheritance in Early Germanic Kingship". Cambridge Historical Journal. 7 (1): 1–22.
- Hallenbeck, Jan T. (1982). "Pavia and Rome: The Lombard Monarchy and the Papacy in the Eighth Century". Transactions of the American Philosophical Society. New Series. 72 (4): 1–186. doi:10.2307/1006429. JSTOR 1006429.
- Hodgkin, Thomas (1895). Italy and Her Invaders, Volume VII: The Lombard kingdom, 600–744. Oxford: Clarendon Press.
- Oman, Charles (1914). The Dark Ages, 476–918. London: Rivingtons.
- Wickham, Chris (1981). Early Medieval Italy: Central Power and Local Society, 400–1000. London: Macmillan.

Regnal titles
Preceded by Liutprand	King of the Lombards; 735–744	Succeeded by Ratchis
