= Ratchis =

King of the Lombards from 744 to 749

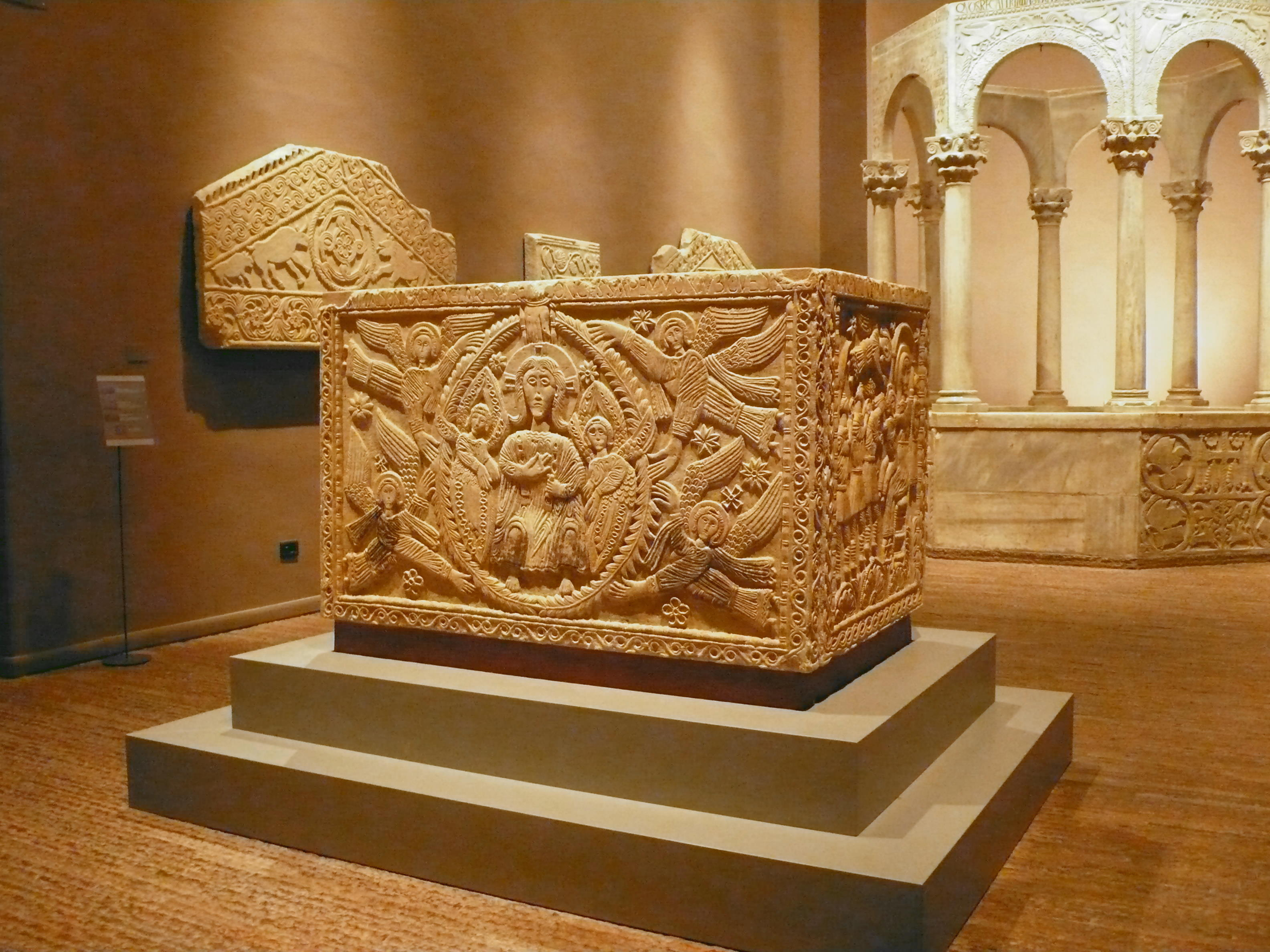
Altar of Ratchis in Cividale, dedicated to the memory of his father Pemmo

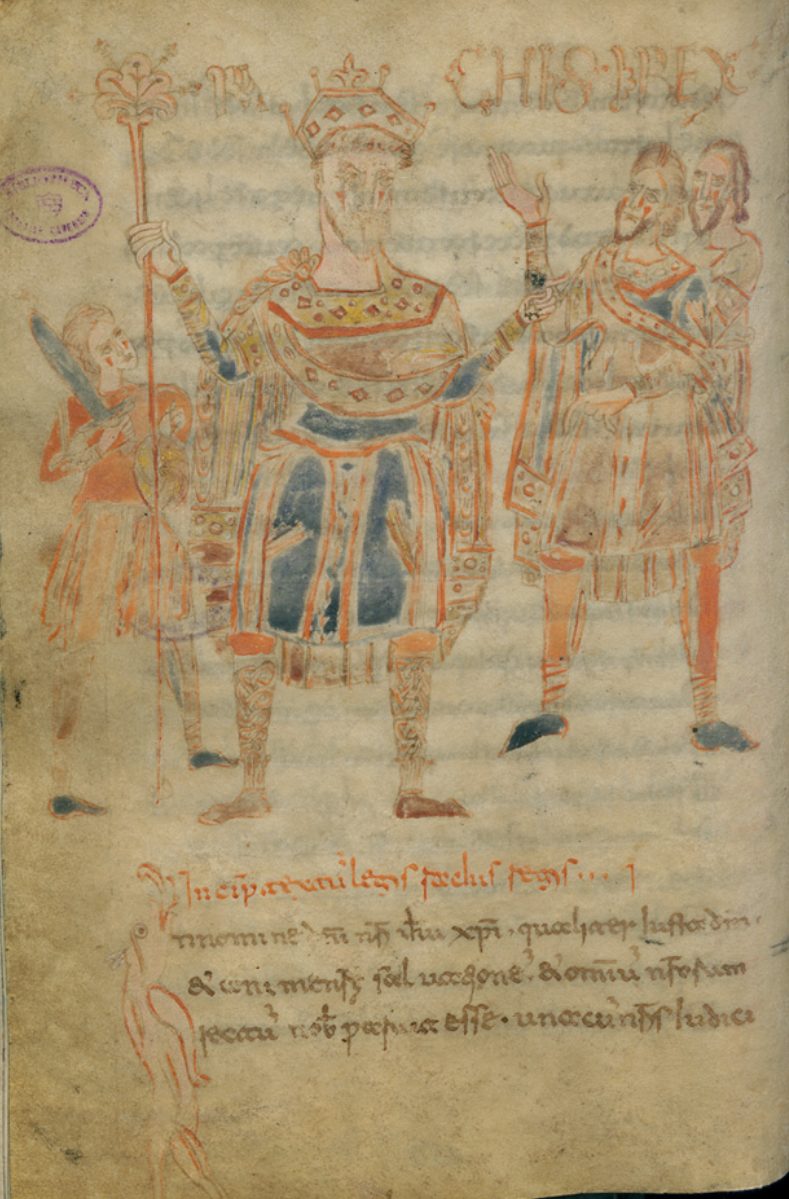
Ratchis's law code, copy from c. 1005

Ratchis (died after 757) was the Duke of Friuli (739–744) and then King of the Lombards (744–749).

Ratchis was the son of Duke Pemmo of Friuli and the nephew of the Lombard king Liutprand, who, despite his history of strife with Pemmo, appointed Ratchis to succeed his father in 737. Ratchis was married to a Roman woman named Tassia. During his rule of Friuli, he launched an expedition against the Slavs in Carniola, across the Eastern Alps, fighting in person during the battles.

Ratchis denique aput Foroiuli dux, ut dixeramus, effectus, in Carniolam Sclavorum patriam cum suis ingressus, magnam multitudinem Sclavorum interficiens, eorum omnia devastavit.

— Paulus Diaconus, Historia Langobardorum, Liber VI

He became king of the Lombards in 744, after the deposition of Hildeprand, most likely with the support of the more autonomous Lombard dukes. Ratchis ruled initially in peace, in particular with the neighboring Byzantine-ruled exarchate of Ravenna. However, perhaps pushed by more traditional parties among his followers, in 749 he invaded the Duchy of the Pentapolis and besieged Perugia. Pope Zachary convinced him to lift the siege, but this further reduced his prestige among the dukes, who deposed him later year at an assembly in Milan. His brother Aistulf succeeded him. Ratchis initially tried to raise opposition to the assembly's decision, but soon was forced to take refuge in Rome. He later entered the abbey of Montecassino with his family.

Following Aistulf's passing in 756, Ratchis fought to reclaim the throne. He was able to gain control of the royal palace in Pavia with the support of several Lombard nobles, but was defeated by the duke of Tuscany, Desiderius, who had the support of Pope Stephen II and the Frankish king Pepin the Short. In 757, Ratchis retired again to a monastery, either Montecassino or Cervaro.

== Sources ==
- Paul the Deacon, Historia Langobardorum Storia dei Longobardi; introduzione di Claudio Leonardi; apparati critici e iconografici a cura di Roberto Cassanelli. Milan: Electa, 1985 (Latin & Italian)
- Jarnut, Jörg (1995) [1982]. Storia dei Longobardi. Translated by Guglielmotti, Paola. Torino: Einaudi. ISBN 88-06-13658-5.
- Sergio Rovagnati, I Longobardi, Milan: Xenia, 2003 ISBN 88-7273-484-3

Regnal titles
Preceded by Pemmo	Duke of Friuli; 739 – 744	Succeeded by Aistulf
Preceded by Hildeprand	King of the Lombards; 744 – 749	Succeeded by Aistulf
