= Duchy of Rome =

Duchy in Byzantine Empire

Dvcatvs Romanvs Δουκᾶτον Ῥώμης
- Duchy of the Byzantine Empire
- Late 7th century–756
- Duchy of Rome (3) within the Byzantine Empire in 717
- Capital: Rome
- History
  - Establishment: Late 7th century
  - Establishment of the Papal States: 756
| Preceded by | Succeeded by |
| Exarchate of Ravenna | Papal States |
- Today part of: Italy; Vatican City

The Duchy of Rome (Latin: Ducatus Romanus; Greek: Δουκᾶτον Ῥώμης, romanized: Doukâton Rhṓmēs) was a state within the Byzantine Exarchate of Ravenna. Like other Byzantine states in Italy, it was ruled by an imperial functionary with the title of dux. The duchy often came into conflict with the Papacy over supremacy within Rome. After the founding of the Papal States in 756, the Duchy of Rome ceased to be an administrative unit and "dukes of Rome", appointed by the popes rather than emperors, are only rarely attested.

== History ==
It is uncertain when exactly the Duchy of Rome was established, but it was most likely in the late 7th century, given the lack of earlier references to such a territory. The dux of Rome was subservient to the Exarch of Ravenna, who wielded the highest imperial authority in Italy. Within the exarchate, the two chief districts were the country about Ravenna where the exarch was the centre of Byzantine opposition to the Lombards, and the Duchy of Rome, which embraced the lands of Southern Etruria north of the Tiber and of Latium to the south as far as the Garigliano (with the exception of Casinum and Aquinum). There the Pope led the opposition to the Lombards.

=== Importance of Rome to Byzantine Italy ===
The strategic importance of the Duchy of the Pentapolis (Rimini, Pesaro, Fano, Sinigaglia, Ancona) and the Duchy of Perugia lay in their ability to retain control of the districts between Ravenna and Rome, and with them communication over the Apennine Mountains. If this strategic connection were broken, it was evident that Rome and Ravenna could not singly maintain themselves for any length of time. This was also recognized by the Lombards. The same narrow strip of land broke the connection between their Duchies of Spoleto and Benevento and the main portion of the king's territories in the north. The Lombards made multiple attacks against this front to wrest control of the peninsula from the Byzantines.

=== Lombard attacks and increase in papal responsibility ===
In 728 the Lombard King Liutprand took the Castle of Sutri, which dominated the highway at Nepi on the road to Perugia. However, Liutprand, softened by the entreaties of Pope Gregory II, restored Sutri "as a gift to the blessed Apostles Peter and Paul".

This expression of the Liber pontificalis was erroneously interpreted to mean that in this gift the beginning of the States of the Church was to be recognized. This is incorrect inasmuch as the Popes continued to acknowledge the imperial government, and Greek officials appeared in Rome for some time longer. It is true, however, that here for the first time the association of ideas on which the States of the Church were to be constructed is met. The Pope asked the Lombards for the return of Sutri for the sake of the Princes of the Apostles and threatened punishment by these sainted protectors. The pious Liutprand was undoubtedly susceptible to such pleas, but never to any consideration for the Greeks. For this reason he gave Sutri to Peter and Paul, that he might not expose himself to their punishment. What the Pope then did with it would be immaterial to him.

The belief that the Roman territory (at first in the more restricted, but afterwards also in the wider sense) was defended by the Prince of the Apostles became more and more prevalent. In 738 the Lombard duke Transamund II of Spoleto captured the Castle of Gallese, which protected the road to Perugia to the north of Nepi. Pope Gregory III made a large payment to the duke to restore the castle to him. The pope then sought an alliance with Duke Transamund to protect himself against Liutprand. However, Liutprand conquered Spoleto, besieged Rome, laid waste the Duchy of Rome, and seized four important frontier fortresses (Blera, Orte, Bomarzo, and Amelia), thereby cutting off communication with Perugia and Ravenna.

This caused the pope in 739 to turn for the first time to the powerful Frankish kingdom, under the protection of which Boniface had begun his successful labours as a missionary in Germany. He sent to Charles Martel, "the powerful mayor of the palace" of the Frankish monarchy and the commander of the Franks in the famous battle at Tours, undoubtedly with the consent of the Greek dux, and appealed to him to protect the tomb of the Apostle. Charles Martel replied to the embassy and acknowledged the gifts, but was unwilling to offer aid against the Lombards, who were helping him against the Saracens.

Accordingly, the successor of Gregory III, Pope Zachary, changed the policy that had been previously followed toward the Lombards. He formed an alliance with Liutprand against Transamund, and in 741 received in return the four castles as the result of a personal visit to the camp of the king at Terni. Liutprand also restored a number of patrimonies that had been seized by the Lombards, and furthermore concluded a twenty years' peace with the Pope.

The duchy now had a respite from Lombard attacks. The Lombards fell upon Ravenna, which they had already held from 731 to 735. The Exarch Eutychius had no other recourse than to seek the aid of the pope. Liutprand did in fact allow himself to be induced by Zachary to surrender the greater part of his conquests. Nor was it unimportant that these districts too once owed their rescue to the pope. Only a short time after Liutprand's death in 744, Zachary was successful in further postponing the catastrophe.

=== Fall of the exarchate – Donation of Pepin ===
In 751 the Exarchate of Ravenna fell to the Lombards under King Aistulf. Rome, under Pope Stephen II, attempted diplomatic negotiations with Aistulf, and upon the failure of those negotiations, entreated King Pepin the Short of the Franks to intervene on its behalf. Pepin defeated the Lombards by 756 and granted the lands of the Duchy of Rome as well as some of the former Lombard possessions associated with the Exarchate of Ravenna to the Papacy in what is referred to as the Donation of Pepin, marking the true beginning of the Papal States.

== Dukes ==
The dukes were initially appointees of the exarch, but by mid-century they were created by the Pope.

- Peter ( –725)
- Marinus (725– )
- Stephen (fl. 743)
- Toto (767–768)
- Gratiosus (769–772)
- John (772– )
- Theodore (fl. 772–795)

The office of Duke of Rome disappeared around 778–781, but there are scattered references to dukes among the Papal officers, who may be successors of the dukes of Rome:

- Leoninus (fl. 772–795)
- Sergius (815)
