= San Pietro in Ciel d'Oro =

8th-century church in Pavia, Lombardy, Italy

Basilica of St. Peter in the Golden Sky
- Basilica di San Pietro in Ciel d'Oro
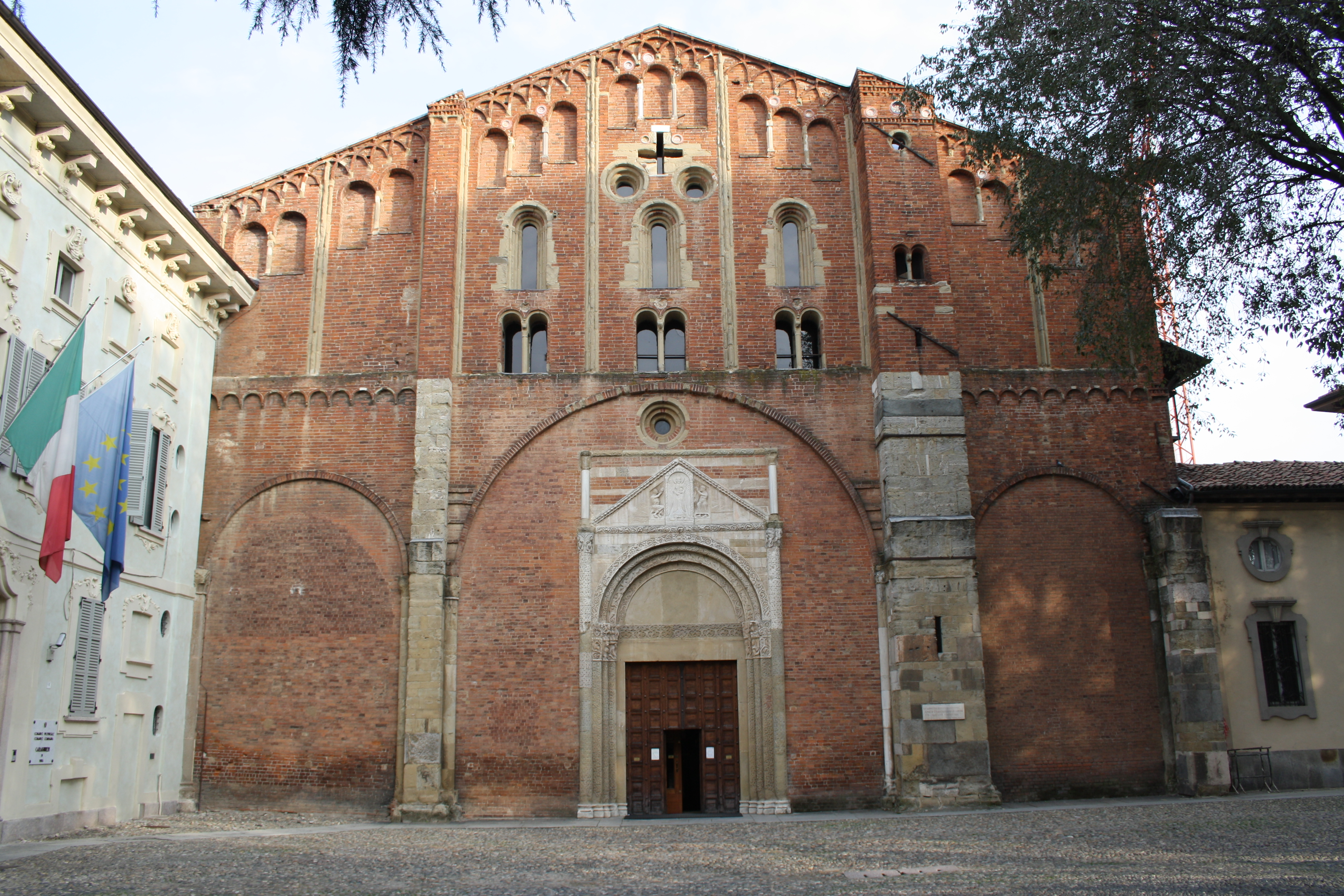
- Façade of the building

- Location within Northern Italy
- 45°11′29″N 9°9′18″E
- Country: Italy
- Denomination: Catholic
- Website: Homepage

History
- Status: Basilica
- Founded: Before 604
- Dedication: Saint Peter
- Consecrated: 1132

Architecture
- Functional status: Active
- Style: Romanesque
- Completed: 720–725

Specifications
- Materials: Brick, sandstone

Administration
- Archdiocese: Milan
- Diocese: Pavia

Monastery of St. Peter in the Golden Sky
- Monastero di San Pietro in Ciel d'Oro
- Interactive map of Monastery of St. Peter in the Golden Sky

Monastery information
- Order: Celtic monks (ca. 7th century); Benedictine (Clunaic} (987–1221); Augustinian canons regular (1221–1387}; Augustinian friars (1387=1785, 1896–)
- Established: ca. 700

The Basilica of St. Peter in the Golden Sky (Italian: Basilica di San Pietro in Ciel d'Oro) is an 8th-century Catholic basilica and monastery church served for centuries by the Augustinian friars in Pavia, in the Lombardy region of Italy. The basilica is noted for being the resting place of St. Augustine of Hippo as well as of the 6th-century philosopher Boethius.

Its name refers to the mosaics of gold leaf behind glass tesserae that decorate the ceiling of the apse. The plain exterior is of brick, with sandstone quoins and window framing. The paving of the church floor is now lower than the modern street level of Piazza San Pietro in Ciel d'Oro, which lies before its façade.

== History ==
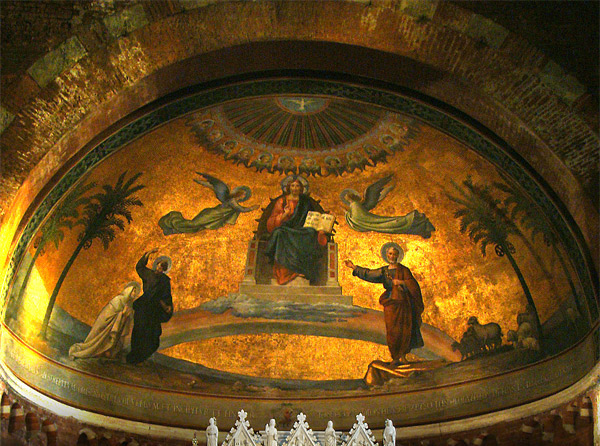
The "Golden Sky" in the apse

A church of Saint Peter is recorded in Pavia in 604; it was renovated by Liutprand, King of the Lombards (who is buried here) between 720 and 725. The present Romanesque church was consecrated by Pope Innocent II in 1132.

The church is the resting place for the remains of Augustine of Hippo, who died in 430 in his home diocese of Hippo Regius, and was buried there, during the time of the Vandals. According to Bede's True Martyrology, the body was removed to Cagliari, Sardinia by the Catholic bishops whom the Arian Vandal Huneric had expelled from north Africa. Bede tells that the remains were subsequently redeemed out of the hands of the Saracens there—by Peter, bishop of Pavia, and uncle of the Lombard king Liutprand—and deposited in the church of Saint Peter about the year 720.

=== Monastery ===
A monastic community was established in connection with the church by the 7th century, by Celtic monks who were actively evangelizing the Kingdom of the Lombards, with its significant Celtic native population. They established a string of monasteries, such as Bobbio Abbey. These monastic communities, following the Rule of St. Columbanus, were also centers of learning.

An important scriptorium was established at the monastery in the 9th century as well as a school, led by the Irish monk Dungal. In the Olonese capitular a decree was issued by the Emperor Lothair in the royal palace of Corteolona in 825, requiring students from Milan, Brescia, Bergamo, Lodi, Novara, Vercelli, Tortona, Asti, Acqui, Genoa and Como to go there to study. From the 10th century the monastery enjoyed numerous privileges, including that of being subject only to the authority of the pope. Since the 11th century, the monks of San Pietro in Ciel d'Oro, who at least since 974 owned vineyards and winepresses near San Damiano al Colle, extended the vine culture in Oltrepò Pavese, producing wines that, thanks to the Po and Ticino, were then transported to Pavia, where the part not absorbed by the consumption of the monks was destined for trade.

In 987 Majolus of Cluny stayed in the monastery and reformed its monastic customs, while, not many years later, in 1004, the monastery hosted the emperor Henry II. In 1022 an important council was held in the basilica (in which decisions were made on the celibacy of religious) presided over by Pope Benedict VIII. During the council (in which the emperor Henry II also participated) an exposition of the relics of Saint Augustine was also held, at the end of which an arm of the saint, thanks to a substantial donation to the monastery, was granted to Æthelnoth archbishop of Canterbury, while other small fragments of Augustine's bones ended up with other prelates present at the council, such as those of Montalcino, Piacenza, Ragusa, Valencia and Lisbon. The importance of the monastery is highlighted by the imperial donations received (between the 9th and 12th centuries) from the emperors Hugh, Otto I, Otto II, Otto III, Henry II, Conrad II, Henry III, Henry V and Frederick Barbarossa.

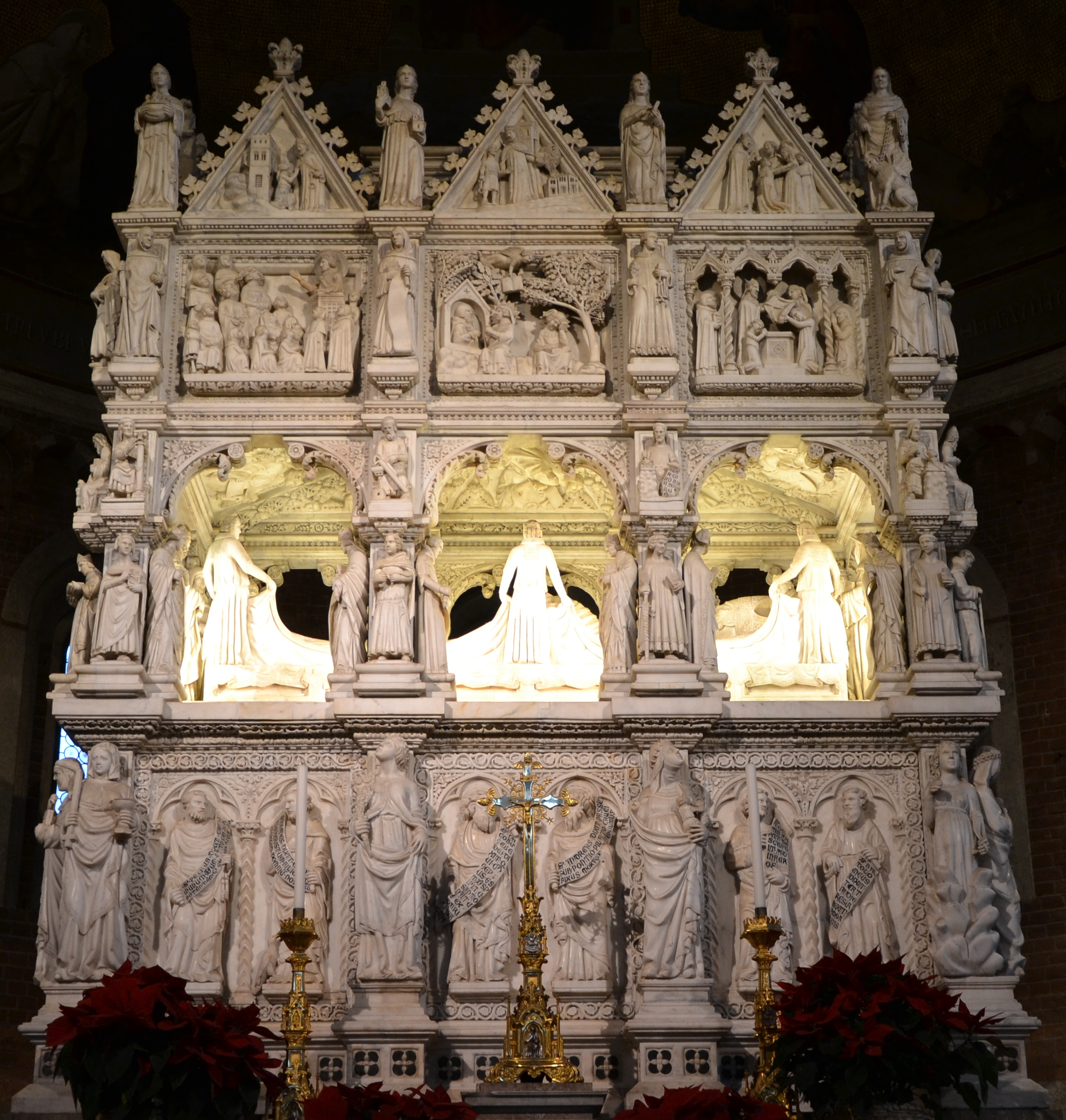
Giovanni di Balduccio, Tomb of St Augustine, the Arca di Sant'Agostino, 1362–1365

In 1221, Pope Honorius III transferred possession of the church and monastery to the canons regular of Santa Croce di Mortara. A century later, in January 1327 Pope John XXII issued the papal bull Veneranda Santorum Patrum, in which he appointed the Augustinian friars as guardians of the tomb of Augustine (the Arca di Sant'Agostino), which was remade in 1362 and elaborately carved with bas-reliefs of scenes from Augustine's life, created by Giovanni di Balduccio. Expelled in 1785, the friars returned in 1896 and continue to serve the church today.

=== Royal Pantheon ===
In 1365 Galeazzo II Visconti moved his residence from Milan to Pavia, in the nearby Visconteo castle, where he installed his court, the Visconti, wishing to refer to the royal past of Pavia, he decided to transform the basilica into the burial church of the dynasty. In 1361 Galeazzo II in fact granted offers to the church and from the following year financed the preparation of the marble ark of St. Augustine. Since then, the privilege of burial inside the Lombard royal basilica became a status symbol of the court of Galeazzo II. Lionel of Antwerp was buried in the church, and the funeral of the Visconti condottiero Luchino Dal Verme, who died in 1367 in Constantinople, was held there. Galeazzo II himself, by his will, was buried in S. Pietro in Ciel d'Oro.

The basilica remained the main sepulchral church of the Visconti court in Pavia until the foundation of the Certosa: between 1384 and the beginning of the 15th century, Francesco d'Este, the eldest daughter of Gian Galeazzo and Caterina Visconti, Violante Visconti and the condottiero Facino Cane. Also in the same years, the basilica was visited by diplomats and ambassadors visiting the court of Galeazzo II, such as Geoffrey Chaucer in 1378. In 1525 the Landsknechte captain Eitel Friedrich III, count of Hohenzollern and Richard de la Pole, pretender to the English crown, who died during the battle of Pavia, were also buried in the basilica.

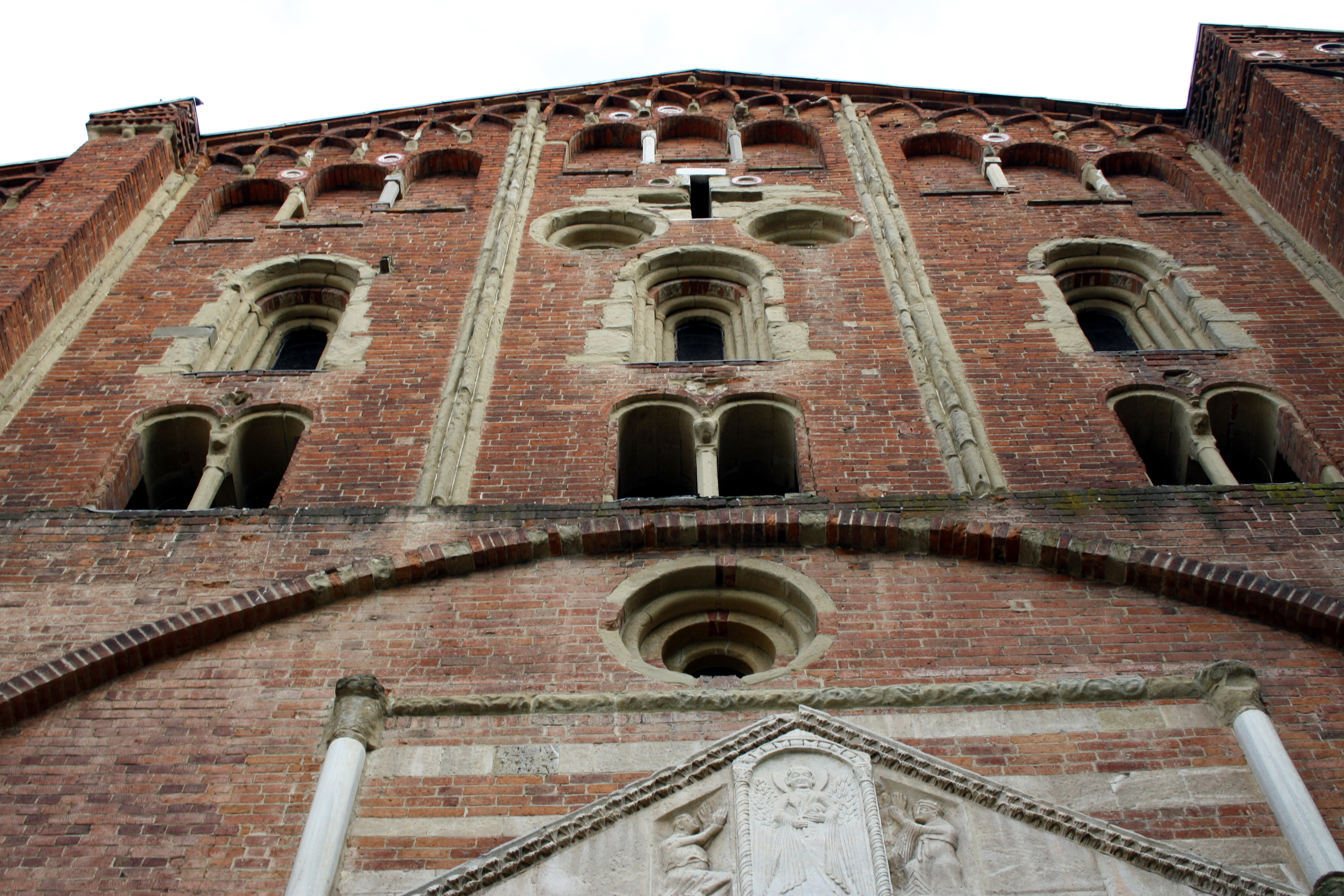
The façade

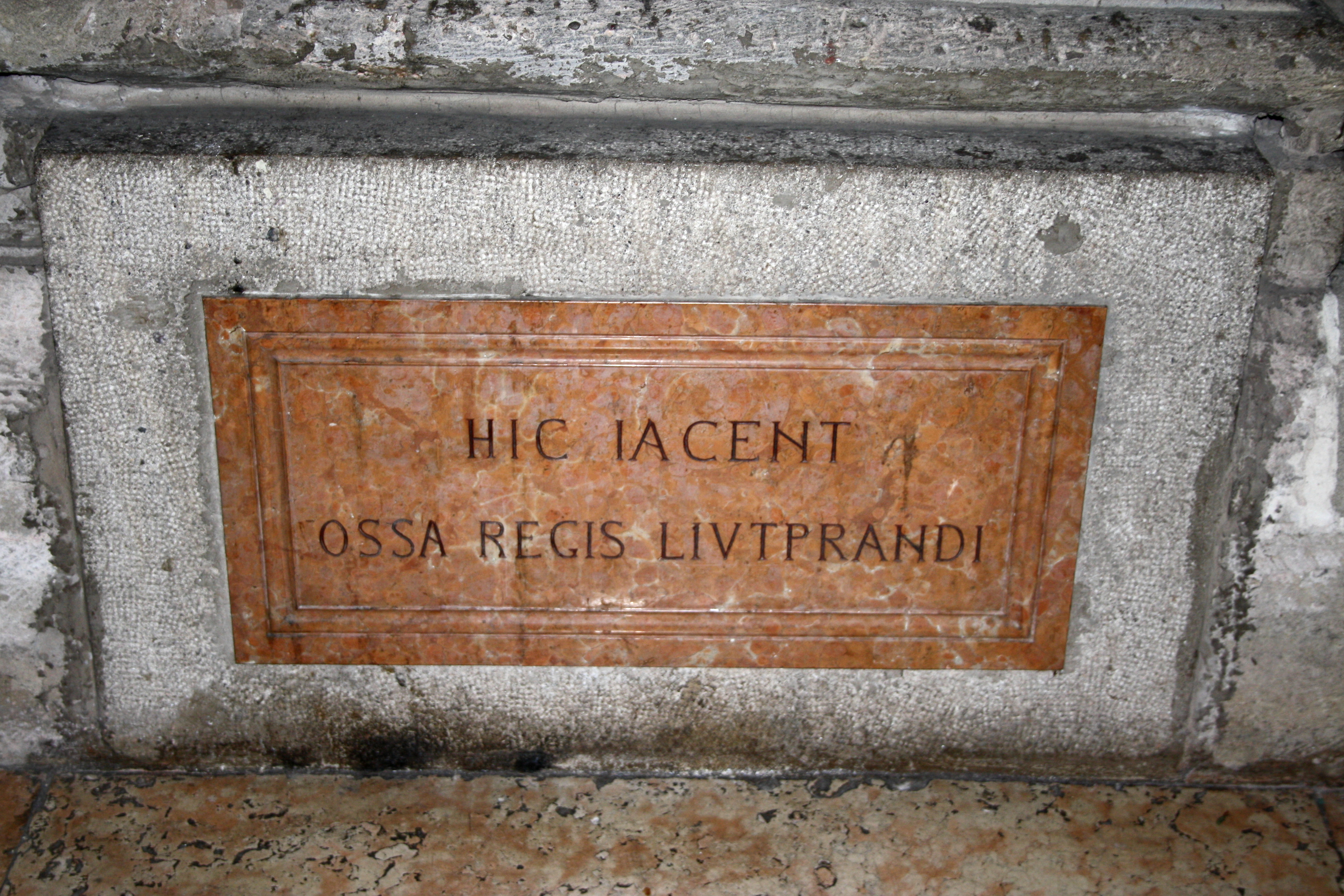
Tomb of Liutprand The gate

In the 1570s, in compliance with the dictates of the Council of Trent, the numerous sarcophagi and funeral monuments that crowded the basilica were removed, also creating a certain embarrassment during liturgical functions. With the exception of the remains of king Liutprand, most of the mortal remains found during the 19th-century restorations were buried below the main nave, near the penultimate pillar before the crypt, as recalled by an epigraph inserted in the floor.

The actual remains of Augustine, however, were no longer identified. Then, on October 1, 1695, illiterate stonemasons working in the crypt altar removed paving blocks and discovered a marble box. Within it were other boxes; in the third box were fragments of wood, numerous bones and bone fragments, and glass vials. Some of the workers later claimed to have seen the name "Augustine" written in charcoal on the top of the box. A factor complicating the authentication of the remains was that San Pietro in Ciel d'Oro was shared by the two Augustinian religious orders in bitter rivalry. The controversy on the authenticity of the bones resulted in broadsides, pamphlets and books. In 1728, Pope Benedict XIII's intervention in Pavia resulted in his approval of the authenticity of Augustine's bones discovered in the church of San Pietro in Ciel d'Oro. (Stone, Harold Samuel (2002). "St. Augustine's Bones: A Microhistory." pp. 90–93)

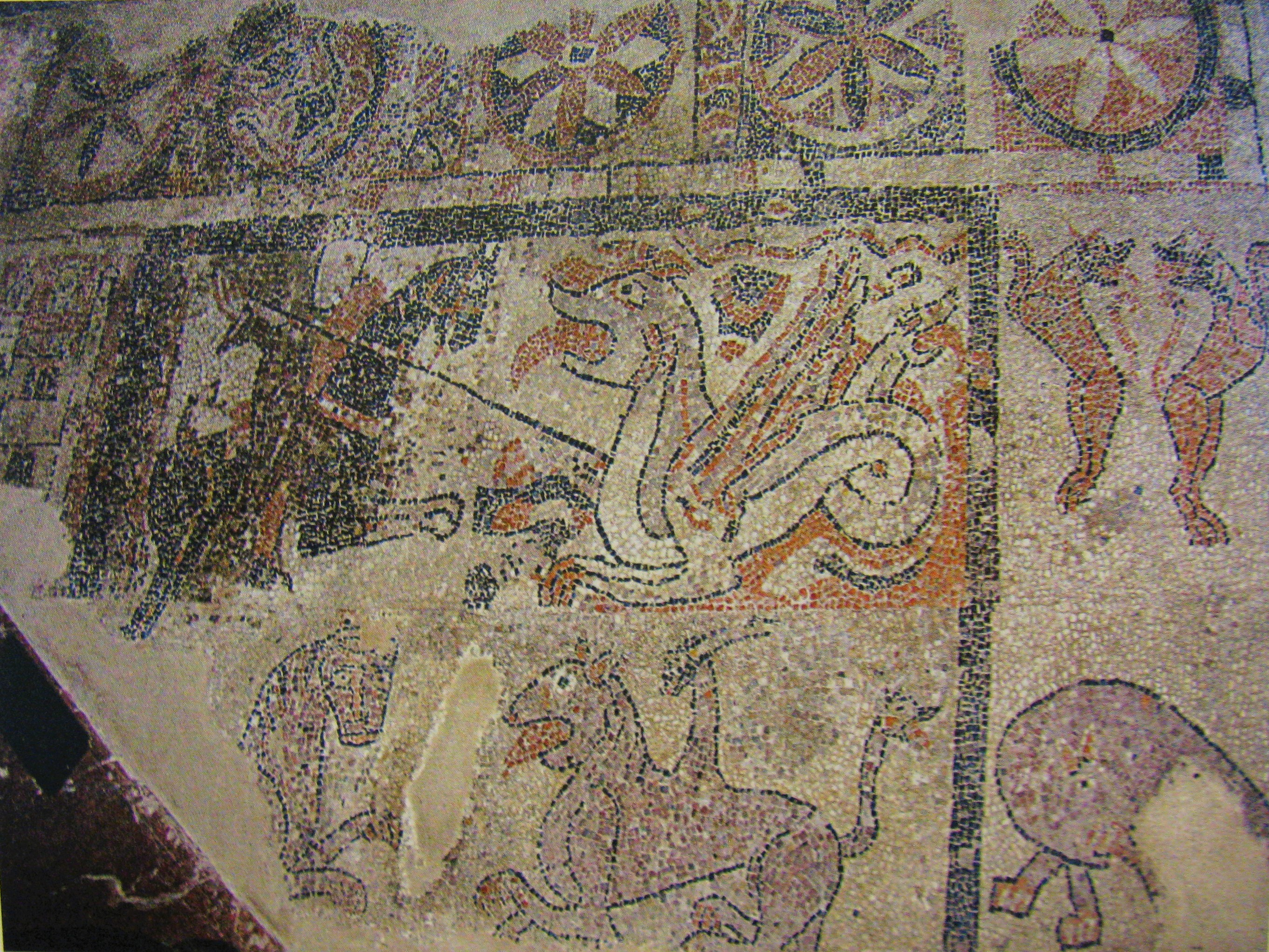
Remains of mosaic, 12th century.

The Augustinians were expelled from Pavia in 1785, Augustine's ark and relics were brought to Pavia Cathedral in 1799. The church fell into disrepair; it was a military magazine under the Napoleonic occupation. It was not restored until the 1870s, under the urging of Agostino Gaetano Riboldi, later Cardinal Riboldi, and reconsecrated in 1896 when the relics of Augustine and the shrine were once again reinstalled.

== Architecture ==
Very few remains of the Lombard church remain, hidden under the Romanesque reconstruction completed around 1132. San Pietro in Ciel d'Oro looks like this, like many other Pavia churches of the time: a brick building, with three naves with transept, apse and crypt.

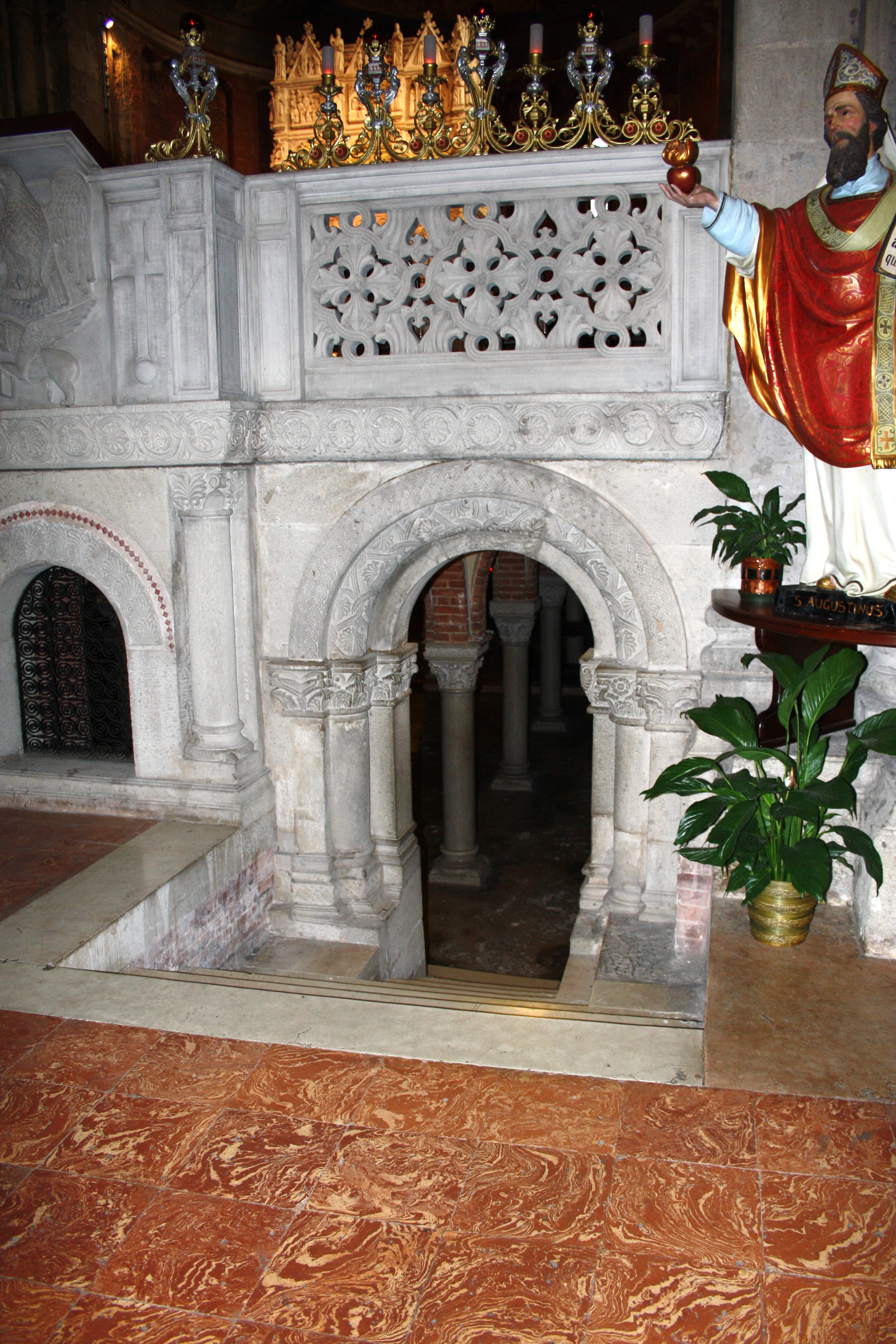
Entrance to the crypt

The façade is marked by two buttresses that divide it into three zones, corresponding to the internal naves; the buttress on the right, more often, houses an internal staircase that allows access to the roof. The top is crowned by a blind loggia and a motif with intertwined arches. The stone (sandstone) is used only for the most important parts, such as the portal and the windows. The portal, in sandstone and marble, bears, within the tympanum, the figure of San Michele in the center, flanked on the sides by the images of two prayers. These sculptures probably come from the previous basilica, since they are dated to 1050–1090. Along the buttresses there are traces of an ancient narthex, or perhaps a quadriporticus, which preceded the entrance to the church.

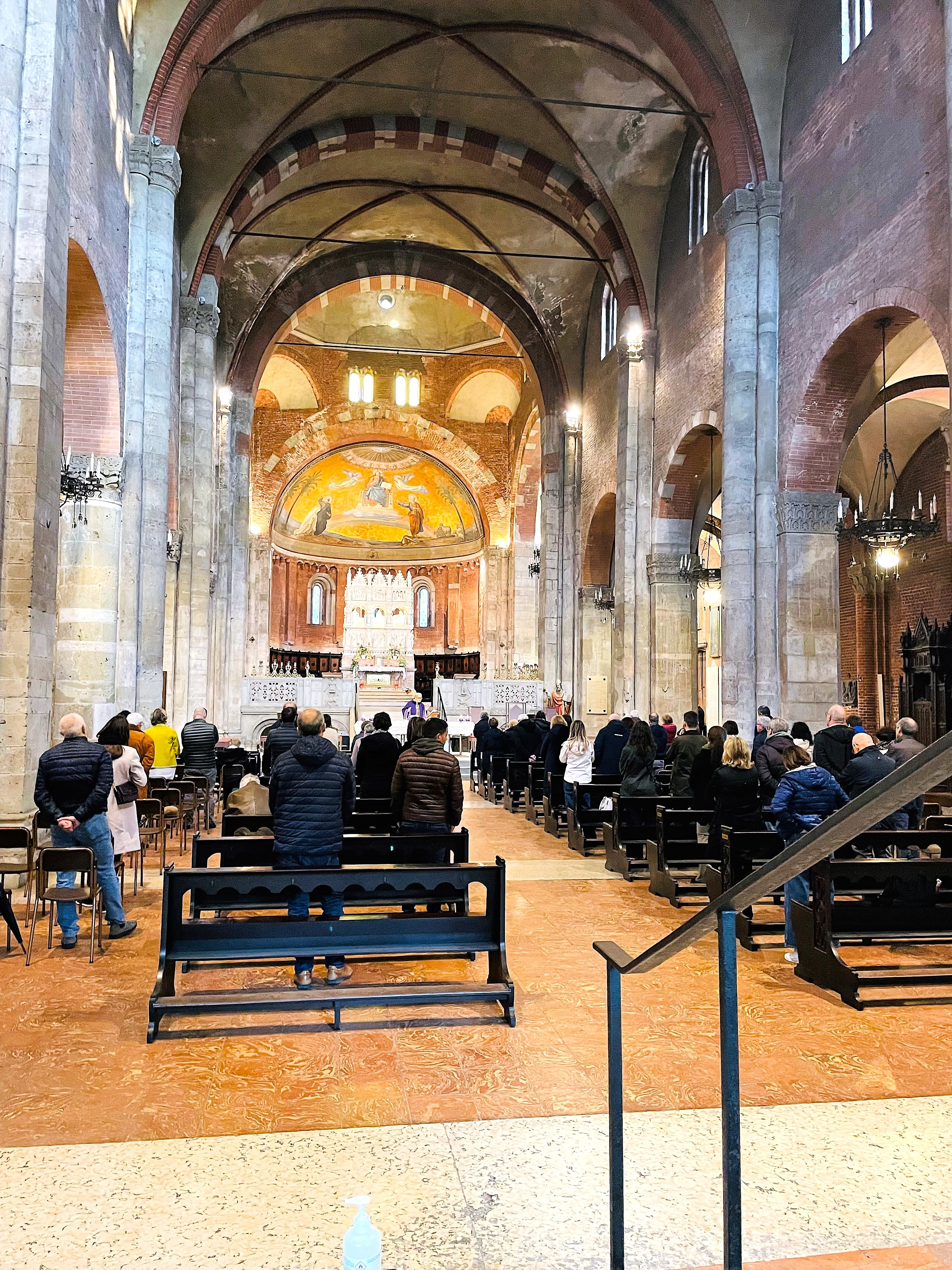
Interior

The interior is marked by five spans, rectangular in the central nave and square in the side aisles. Compared to the basilica of San Michele Maggiore, one immediately perceives the different proportions of the central nave, wider, longer and less slender, the more rigorous succession of the pillars, all roughly in the same section rather than alternating as in the other church, and the absence of the matronaea. The spans from the second to the fifth are covered with rib vaults; the first, higher, almost as a function of an internal atrium (endonarthex) or even a false transept, is covered by a barrel vault.

It also performs static functions as it serves as a support for the façade. At the base of the last pillar of the right aisle there is the tomb of King Liutprand. In 2018, the bones were the subject of a bioarchaeological and genetic investigation. The analyzes showed that the bones belonged to three upper-class individuals, with strong muscles and who ate proteins, mainly from meat and fish, to a greater extent than the rest of the population, as evidenced by the comparisons with the bone findings. coming from some necropolis of the Lombard age found in northern Italy. Of these three individuals, two (a middle-aged man and a younger man) date back to the 6th century, while the third subject, who died around 40/50 years old, was a contemporary of Liutprando: it is therefore possible that the bones of the third individual may belong to the Lombard king.

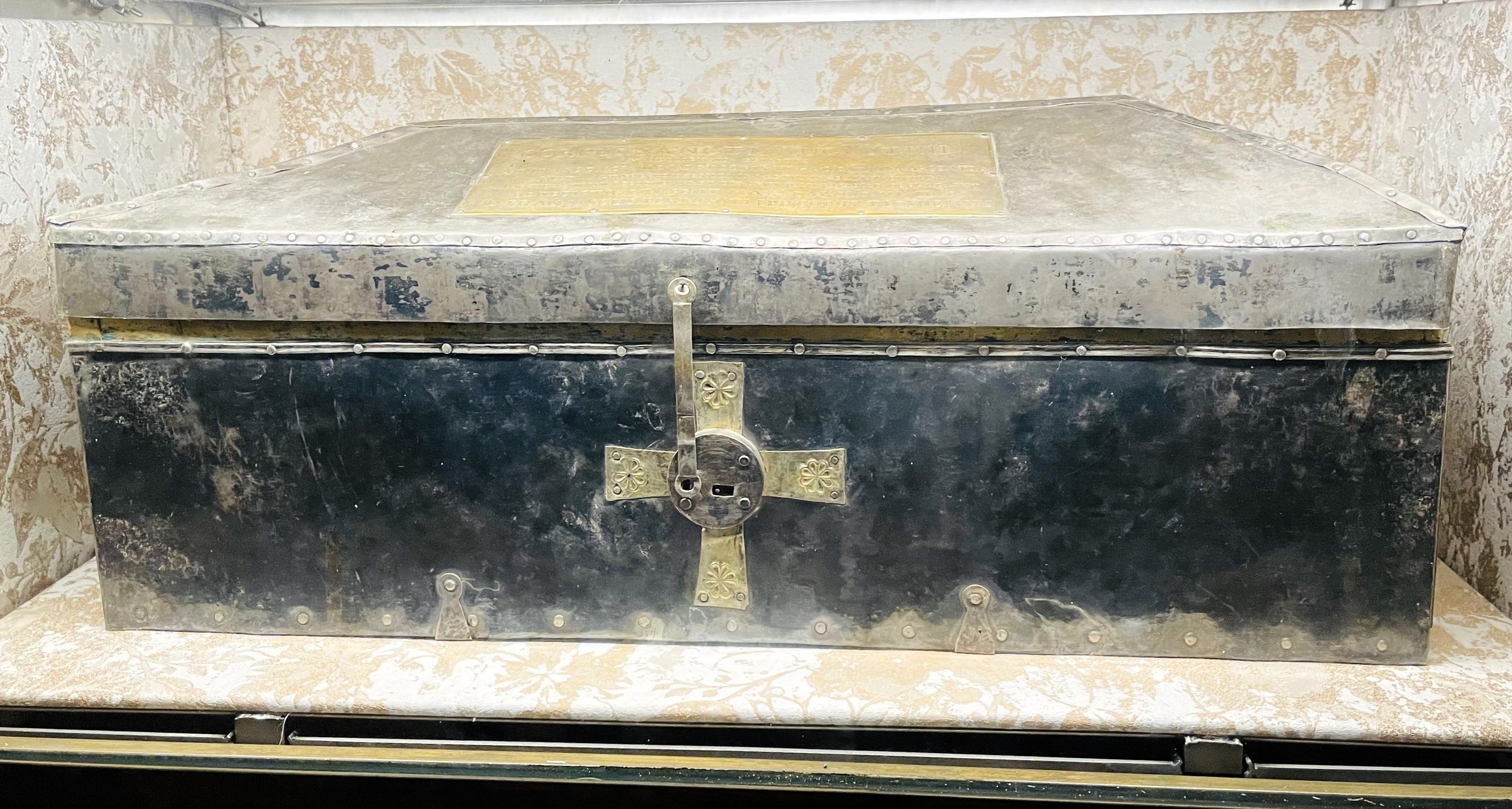
Silver box with the relics of St. Augustine, moved to Pavia around 725.

In the presbytery, before the choir, there is the Ark of Sant'Agostino, created by Giovanni di Balduccio, a marble masterpiece of the fourteenth century. It is a Gothic work divided into three bands: below, a plinth containing the urn with the remains of the saint; in the center, an open band, with the statue of sleeping St. Augustine and, at the top, the last band, resting on small pillars and crowned by triangular cusps. The entire work is decorated with more than 150 statues, which represent angels, saints, and bishops, and with tiles with the life of the saint. The ark houses the Reliquary Box of Sant'Agostino, a work of goldsmith's work from the Lombard age. The box, in silver, was donated to the monastery by King Liutprand around 725.

The crypt, with a nave and two aisles, is located immediately under the altar and houses the tomb of Boethius.

== Cultural impact ==
According to tradition, in 504 the Vandal king Thrasamund exiled Saint Fulgentius of Ruspe and other North African Catholic bishops to Sardinia. They brought the saint's relics with them, and in Cagliari they found asylum in an underground chapel, located in largo Carlo Felice, in the Stampace district and accessible by a spiral staircase in the Accardo Palace.

In 722–723 Liutprand probably sent a delegation to Cagliari charged with purchasing the relics with a large sum of money and transporting them to Pavia to bring prestige to the kingdom's new capital. The box was then donated by the Longobard king to the Monastery of San Pietro in Ciel d'Oro around 725.

Having lost track of the original 14th-century burial, around 1360, in the sacristy of the Order of the Augustinian hermits, it was replaced by a candid marble ark, the work of Campionese masters. It is mentioned by Petrarch in a letter sent to Boccaccio dated December 22 1365 (currently collected in his Seniles, V, 1).

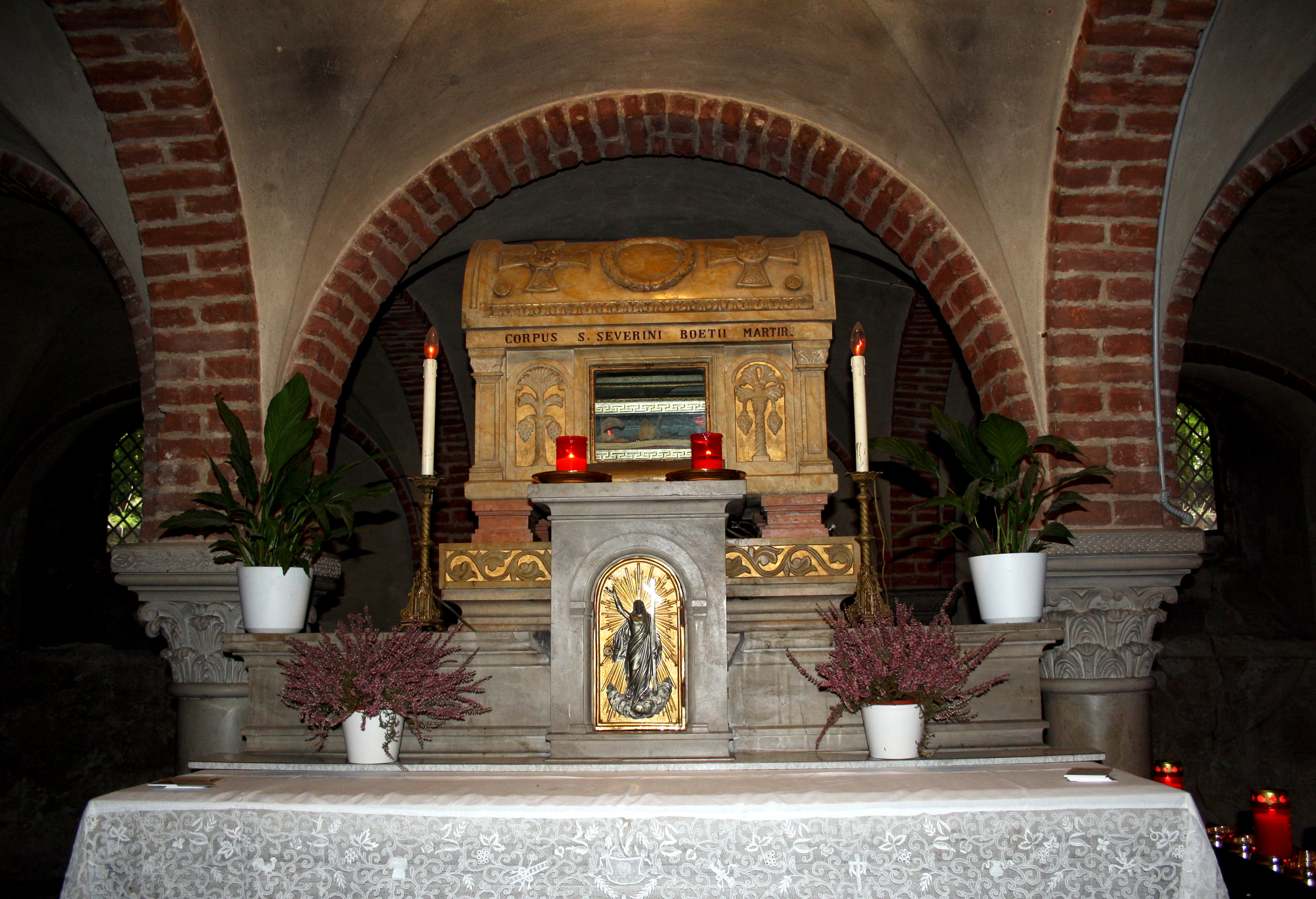
Tomb of Boethius in San Pietro in Ciel d'Oro.

Besides being the burial place of Liutprand and Augustine, San Pietro in Ciel d'Oro contains in its crypt that of Boethius, whose Consolation of Philosophy is often taken as the final literary production of Late Antiquity. Dante mentions this in Il Paradiso, canto X:

Lo corpo ond’ella fu cacciata giace
giuso in Cieldauro; ed essa da martiro
e da essilio venne a questa pace

("The body whence it was chased forth / lieth down below in Cieldauro and itself from martyrdom / and exile came unto this peace.")

Boccaccio's Decameron features a chapter (tenth day, ninth novella) that takes place in the basilica: the sumptuous bed of Thorello, soundly sleeping, is magically transported to San Pietro in Ciel d'Oro, where the sacristan discovers him at Matins the following morning.
