= San Marino, Pavia =

Church building in Pavia, Italy

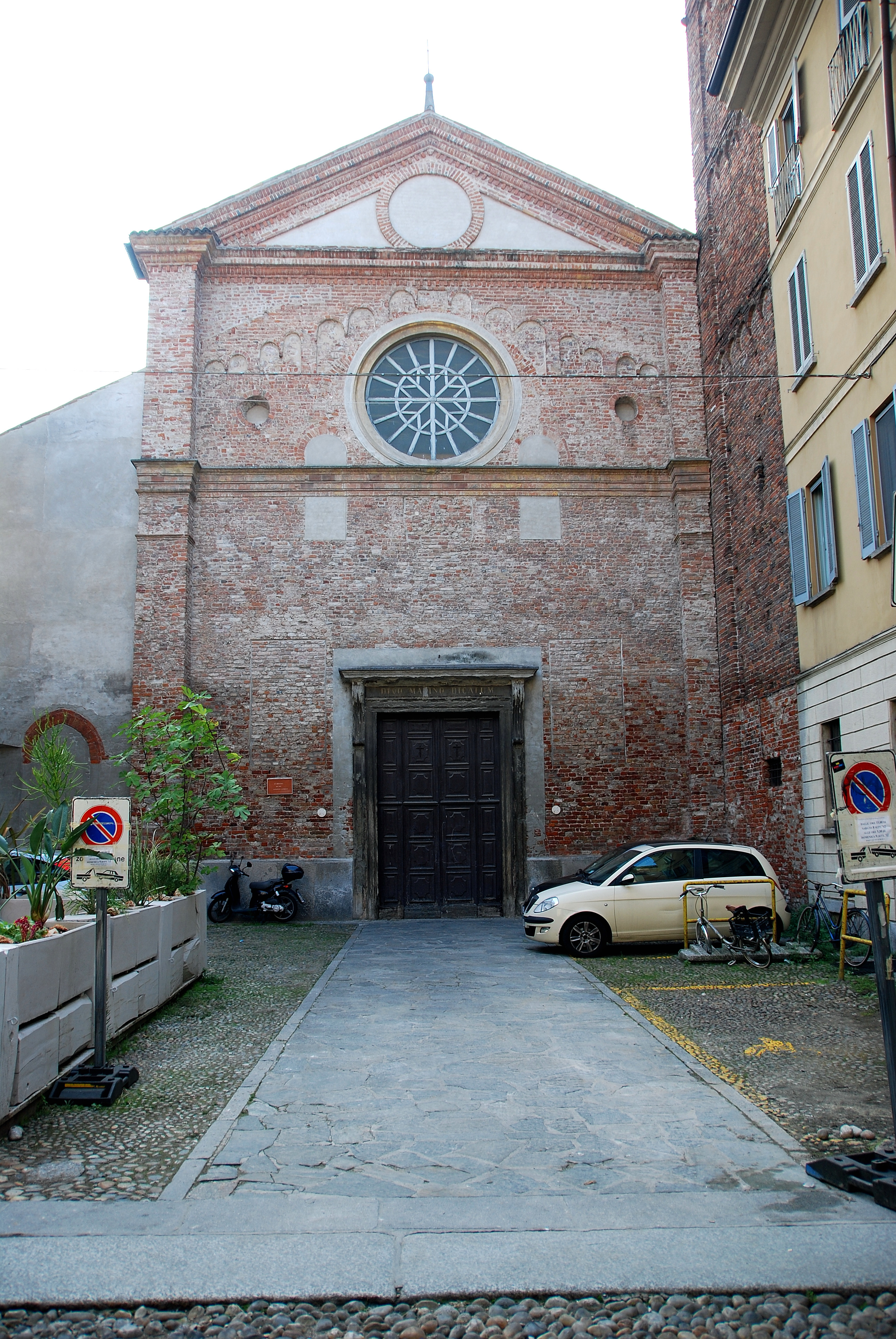
- The faςade

Religion
- Affiliation: Catholic
- Province: Pavia
- Year consecrated: 8th century
- Status: Active

Location
- Location: Pavia, Italy
- Interactive map of San Marino, Pavia
- Coordinates: 45°11′0.5″N 9°9′21.68″E

Architecture
- Type: Church

The church of San Marino is a Roman Catholic church located on Via Siro Comi in Pavia, region of Lombardy, Italy

== History ==
The church was founded by the Lombard king Aistulf, who placed many relics of saints (including those of Saints Marinus and Leo) removed from Rome and who, after his death, was buried in the church.

Among the relics preserved, the body of Saint Vitus should also be mentioned, which in 1355 the Emperor Charles IV had it transported to the cathedral of Prague. In the presbytery of the church there is a fragment of an eighth century inscription that mentions Gisulf and some fragments of bas-reliefs from the Lombard period. Next to the church, a Benedictine monastery was built, documented at least since 881. At the end of the 11th century the monastery passed to the dependence of the French congregation of the Chaise-Dieu of Clermont-Ferrand. The institution obtained many privileges and assets from the Carolingian and Ottonian kings and then from the Emperor Frederick I, who granted the monastery a diploma in 1155 with which numerous possessions were confirmed to the monastery, mainly located in the territories of Lecco, Bergamo and Ottobiano.

Precisely in these years the building was remodeled in Romanesque forms and was equipped with a bell tower, while preserving most of the perimeter walls of the early medieval church, as well as part of the facade (in which you can still see the blind arches and some openings) and the apse. In 1281 the monastery passed to the Dominicans, who kept it until 1304, when they moved to the nearby church of San Tommaso. In the same year, the Benedictines returned to possession of the monastery, which they held until 1481, when the Hieronymites took over from the Benedictines and, during the sixteenth century, the church and the monastery were subject to substantial reconstruction works. The monastery, which in the eighteenth century controlled numerous agricultural estates, especially around the city and in the Pavia area, was suppressed in 1799.

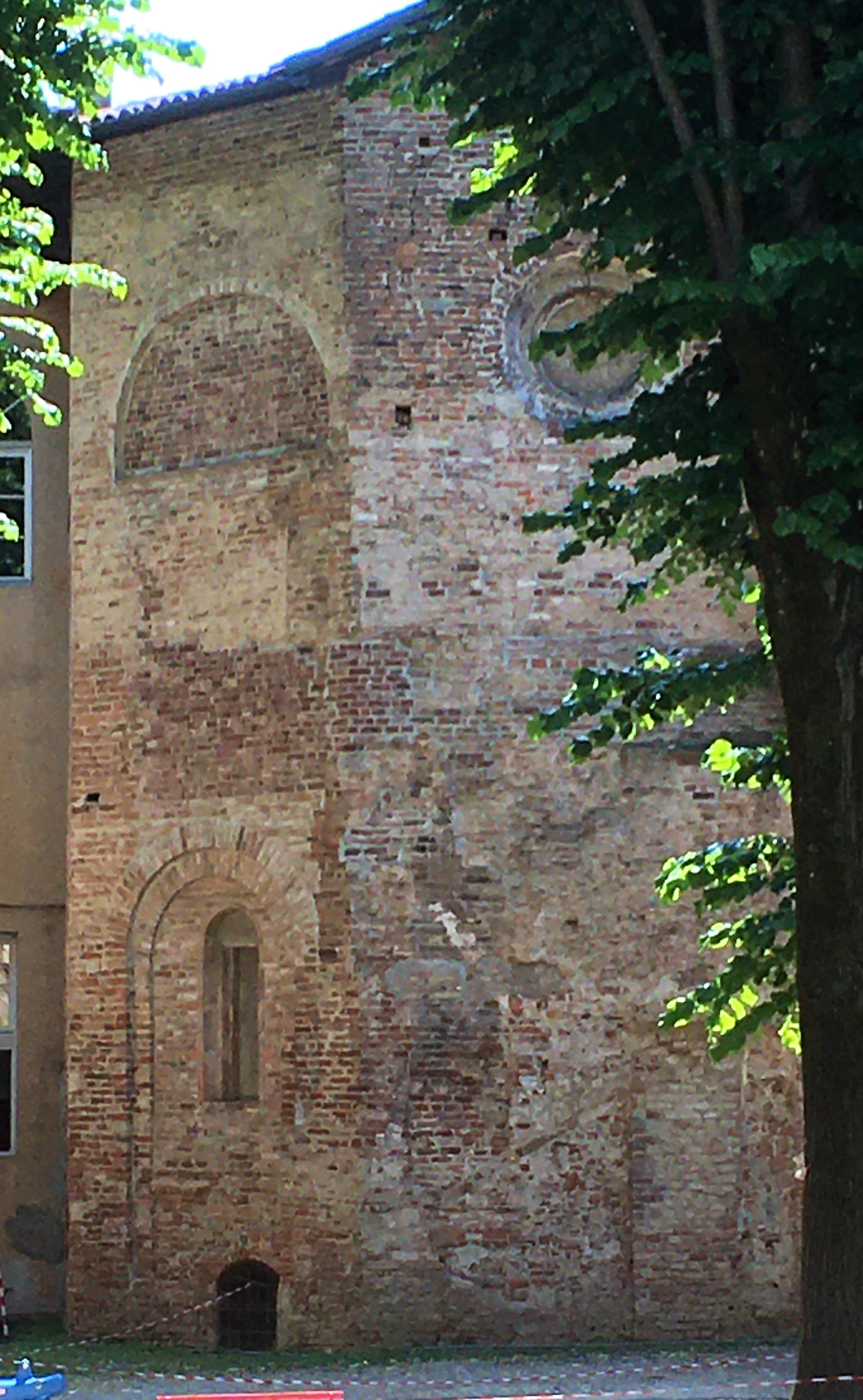
The early medieval apse (with changes in the 12th and 16th centuries)

== Architecture ==
The interior of the church, mostly remodeled between the sixteenth and seventeenth centuries, when the previous planimetric organization in three naves gave way to a nave with side chapels, nevertheless retains traces of frescoes from the thirteenth century. The first chapel on the right is dedicated to Saint Expeditus and has frescoes painted in the first decade of the sixteenth century by Bernardino de Rossi, while the first chapel on the right, which was the chapel of the goldsmiths' guild, was dedicated to Saint Eligius and was always refreshed in the sixteenth century. On the other hand, the Renaissance works are greater, such as the fifteenth-century wooden choir stalls (from the church of San Tommaso), the organ, the work of the Antegnati of 1517 and the large altarpiece by Giampetrino dated to 1521 and now deposited at the Episcopal Palace.

== Bibliography ==
- Musei Civici di Pavia. Pavia longobarda e capitale di regno. Secoli VI- X, a cura di Saverio Lomartire, Davide Tolomelli, Milano: Skira, 2017.
- Giovanna Forzatti Golia, Istituzioni ecclesiastiche pavesi dall'età longobarda alla dominazione visconteo- sforzesca, Roma: Herder, 2002.
- Aldo A. Settia, Pavia carolingia e postcarolingia, in Storia di Pavia, II, L'alto medioevo, Milano: Banca del Monte di Lombardia, 1987.
