= Pope Gregory II =

Head of the Catholic Church from 715 to 731

Pope Saint Gregory II
- Bishop of Rome
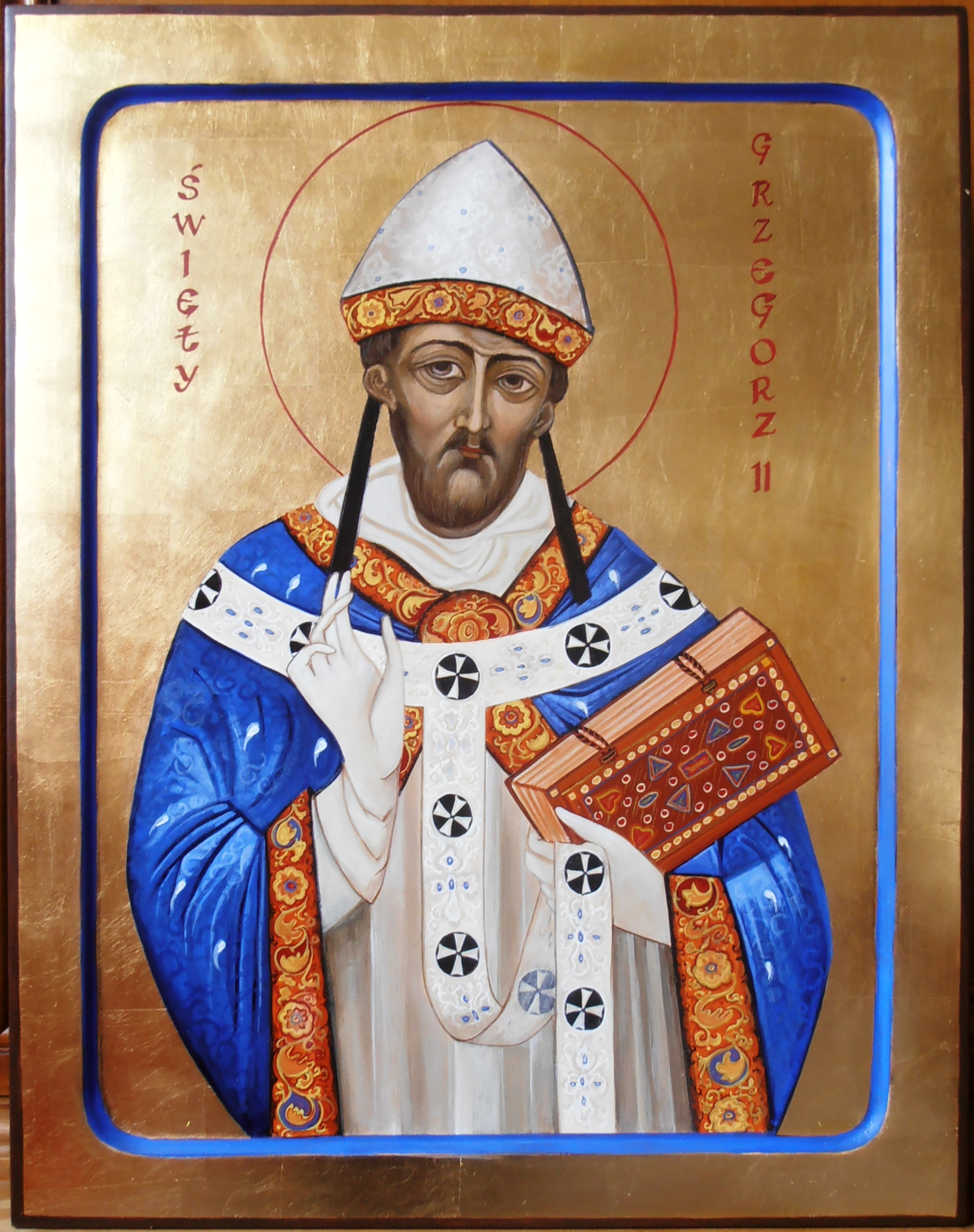
- Icon of Gregory II, Poland
- Church: Catholic Church
- Papacy began: 19 May 715
- Papacy ended: 11 February 731
- Predecessor: Constantine
- Successor: Gregory III

Personal details
- Born: 669 Rome, Italy, Eastern Roman Empire
- Died: 11 February 731 (aged c. 62) Rome, Italy, Eastern Roman Empire

Sainthood
- Feast day: 11 February
- Venerated in: Catholic Church
- Attributes: Papal vestments; Pallium

Pope Gregory II (Latin: Gregorius II; 669 – 11 February 731) was the bishop of Rome from 19 May 715 to his death on 11 February 731. His defiance of Emperor Leo III the Isaurian as a result of the iconoclastic controversy in the Eastern Empire prepared the way for a long series of revolts, schisms, and civil wars that eventually led to the establishment of the temporal power of the popes.

== Early life ==
Born into a noble Roman family in the year 669, Gregory II was the son of Marcellus and wife Honesta. He was an alleged collateral ancestor to the Roman Savelli family, according to a 15th-century chronicler, but this is unattested in contemporary documents and very likely unreliable. The same was said of the seventh-century Pope Benedict II, but nothing certain is known about a kinship between the two of them.

As a young man, he was placed in the papal court, and was made a subdeacon and sacellarius of the Roman See during the pontificate of Sergius I (687–701). Later he was made a deacon and placed in charge of the library of the Roman Church. During Constantine's pontificate, Gregory was made a papal secretary, and accompanied the pope to Constantinople in 711 to deal with the issues raised by Rome's rejection of the canons of the Quinisext Council. The actual negotiations on the contentious articles were handled by Gregory, with the result that Emperor Justinian II agreed that the papacy could disregard whichever of the council's decisions it wished to.

After Constantine's death on 9 April 715, Gregory was elected pope, and was consecrated as bishop of Rome on 19 May 715.

== First years and expanding missionary activity ==
Almost immediately, Gregory began the task of repairing Rome's Aurelian Walls, beginning at the Porta Tiburtina. Work on this task was delayed in October 716 when the river Tiber burst its banks and flooded Rome, causing immense damage and only receding after eight days. Gregory ordered a number of litanies to be said to stem the floods, which spread over the Campus Martius and the so-called Plains of Nero, reaching the foot of the Capitoline Hill. The first year of his pontificate also saw a letter arrive from Patriarch John VI of Constantinople, who attempted to justify his support of Monothelitism, while at the same time seeking sympathy from the pope over the position he was in, with respect to the emperor. Gregory responded by sending a letter outlining the traditional Roman position against Monothelitism.

Then in 716, Gregory received an official visit from Duke Theodo of Bavaria to discuss the continuing conversion of his lands to Christianity. As a result of this meeting, Gregory gave specific instructions to his delegates who were to travel to Bavaria, coordinate with the duke, and establish a local church hierarchy, overseen by an archbishop. Gregory maintained an interest in Bavaria; in 726 he forced an unwilling Corbinian, after reviewing his appeal through a synod, to abandon his monastic calling, and become bishop of Freising in upper Bavaria.

Gregory next turned his attention to Germany. In 718, he was approached by an Anglo-Saxon missionary, Winfrid, who proposed undertaking missionary work in Germany. Gregory agreed, and after changing his name to Boniface, commissioned him in May 719 to preach in Germany. After hearing of the work that had been done so far, in 722 Gregory summoned Boniface back to Rome to answer rumors concerning Boniface's doctrinal purity. At this face-to-face meeting, Boniface complained that he found Gregory's Latin difficult to understand, a clear indication that Vulgar Latin had already started to evolve into the Romance languages. After examining Boniface's written profession of faith, Gregory was satisfied enough that he made Boniface a bishop in November 722, and returned him to Germany to continue his mission. Continued successes saw Gregory write to Boniface in December 724 to offer his congratulations, followed in November 726 by a response to Boniface's questions about how to structure the newly emergent churches in Germany.

Gregory also strengthened papal authority in the churches of Britain and Ireland. In 726 Gregory was visited by Ine, the former King of Wessex, who had abdicated the throne in order to undertake a pilgrimage to Rome and end his life there.

== Local church activities ==
Gregory also concerned himself with establishing or restoring monasteries. He turned his family mansion in Rome into a monastery, St. Agatha in Suburra, endowing it with expensive and precious vessels for use at the altar, and also established a new church, dedicated to Saint Eustace. In 718 he restored Monte Cassino, which had not recovered from an attack by the Lombards in 584, and he intervened in a dispute at the Monastery of St. Vincent on the Volturno over the deposition of the abbot.

In 721, Gregory held a synod in Rome, for the purpose of fixing issues around illegitimate marriages. Then in 723, the longstanding dispute between the patriarchs of Aquileia and Grado flared up again. Upon the request of the Lombard king, Liutprand, Gregory had given the pallium to Bishop Serenus, granting him the patriarchate of Aquileia. Soon afterward, however, Gregory received a letter from Donatus, Patriarch of Grado, complaining that Serenus had overstepped his authority, and was interfering within what was Grado's ecclesiastical jurisdiction. At the same time, Gregory reprimanded Donatus for complaining about Gregory's decision to grant the pallium to Serenus in the first place. Then in 725, upon Donatus' death, the Grado patriarchate was usurped by Peter, the Bishop of Pola. Gregory responded by depriving Peter of both sees, and he wrote to the people of the diocese, reminding them to only elect bishops in accordance with church law, whereupon they elected Antoninus, with Gregory's approval.

Gregory also mandated a number of practices within the Church. He decreed that in Lent, on Thursdays, people should fast, just as they were required to do during the other days of the week. Apparently, the practice had been frowned upon by popes of previous centuries, as pagans had fasted on Thursday as part of their worship of Jupiter. He also prescribed the offices be said during church services on Thursdays in Lent, as prior to this, the Mass of the preceding Sunday was said on those Thursdays.

== Relations with the Lombards ==
Gregory attempted to remain on good diplomatic terms with the Lombards, and especially with their king, Liutprand. In April 716 he managed to get Liutprand to agree not to retake the Cottian Alps, which had been granted to the Roman Church in the reign of Aripert II. However, the semi-independent Lombard Duchy of Benevento, under the expansionist duke Romuald II, resumed hostilities by capturing Cumae in 717, cutting Rome off from Naples. Neither threats of divine retribution nor outright bribery made an impression on Romuald, and so Gregory appealed to Duke John I of Naples, funding his campaign to successfully retake Cumae.

That same year saw the Lombard duke Faroald II of Spoleto, capture Classis, the port of Ravenna. Gregory brokered a deal with Liutprand, who forced Faroald to return it to the Exarch of Ravenna. Perceiving that the Lombard threat would continue to fester and they would take imperial territory in Italy a piece at a time, in around 721 Gregory appealed to the Franks, asking Charles Martel to intervene and drive out the Lombards. Charles however, did not respond to the request. A law issued by Liutprand in 723 (No. 33) prohibits a man from marrying the widow of his cousin on either mother's or father's side, and specifically states that the "Pope in the city of Rome" [papa urbis romae] had sent him a letter exhorting him to issue this legislation, indicating a degree of cordial communication between them. Imperial weakness in Italy encouraged further Lombard incursions, and in 725, they captured the fortress of Narni.

Then in 727, with the Exarchate of Ravenna in chaos over the Byzantine Emperor's iconoclast decrees (see below), the Lombards captured and destroyed Classis and overran the Pentapolis. Although Classis was retaken in 728, fighting continued between Byzantine forces and the Lombards until 729, when Gregory brokered a deal between Liutprand and the Byzantine exarch, Eutychius, bringing about a temporary ceasing of hostilities that held until Gregory's death. Gregory and Liutprand met in 729 at the ancient city of Sutri. Here, the two reached an agreement, known as the Donation of Sutri, whereby Sutri and some hill towns in Latium (see Vetralla) were given to the papacy. They were the first extension of papal territory beyond the confines of the Duchy of Rome

== Conflict with Emperor Leo III ==
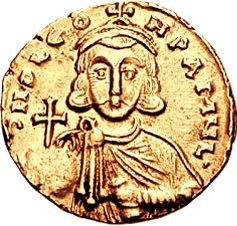
Byzantine Emperor Leo III who sought to impose iconoclastic doctrines in the west

Tensions between Gregory and the imperial court began around 722 when emperor Leo III attempted to raise taxes on the papal patrimonies in Italy, draining the Papacy's monetary reserves. Leo required this revenue to pay for the ongoing Arab war, while Gregory needed it to provide local foodstuffs for the city of Rome, thereby relieving Rome on its reliance upon the long-distance supply of grain. The result of which was, through refusing to pay the additional taxes, Gregory encouraged the Roman populace to drive the imperial governor of Rome from the city, and Leo was unable to impose his will upon Rome, as Lombard pressure kept the exarch of Ravenna from fielding an army to bring the pope to heel.

However, in 725, possibly at the emperor's request, Marinus, who had been sent from Constantinople to govern the Duchy of Rome, encouraged a conspiracy to murder the pope. Involving a duke named Basil, the Chartoularios Jordanes, and a subdeacon named Laurion, the departure of Marinus paused the plot, only to see it resume with the arrival of the new exarch, Paul. However, the plot was uncovered, and the conspirators were put to death.

Then in 726, Leo issued an iconoclast edict, condemning possession of any icon of the saints. Although Leo made no move to enforce this edict in the west beyond having it read in Rome and Ravenna, Gregory immediately rejected the edict. Upon hearing this, the Exarchate of Ravenna rose in revolt against the imperial imposition of iconoclasm. The armies of Ravenna and the Duchy of the Pentapolis mutinied, denouncing both Exarch Paul and Leo III, and overthrew those officers who remained loyal. Paul rallied the loyalist forces and attempted to restore order, but was killed. The armies discussed electing their own emperor and marching on Constantinople, but were dissuaded by Pope Gregory from acting against Leo. At the same time, the self-described "duke" Exhilaratus and his son Hadrian rebelled in Naples, sided with the emperor and marched on Rome in order to kill Gregory, but were overthrown by the people and killed.

In 727, Gregory summoned a synod to condemn iconoclasm. According to Greek sources, principally Theophanes, it was at this point that Gregory excommunicated Leo. However, no western source, in particular, the Liber Pontificalis, confirms this act by Gregory. He then dispatched two letters to Leo, denying the Imperial right to interfere in matters of doctrine. He wrote:

"You say: 'We worship stones and walls and boards.' But it is not so, O Emperor; but they serve us for remembrance and encouragement, lifting our slow spirits upwards, by those whose names the pictures bear and whose representations they are. And we worship them not as God, as you maintain, God forbid!... Even the little children mock at you. Go into one of their schools, say that you are the enemy of images, and straightway they will throw their little tablets at your head, and what you have failed to learn from the wise you may pick up from the foolish... In virtue of the power which has come down to us from St. Peter, the Prince of the Apostles, we might inflict punishment upon you, but since you have invoked one on yourself, have that, you and the counselors you have chosen... though you have so excellent a high priest, our brother Germanus, whom you ought to have taken into your counsels as father and teacher. . . . The dogmas of the Church are not a matter for the emperor, but for the bishops."

Gregory's letters to Leo have been accused of being apocryphal, and may not accurately reflect the real content of Gregory's correspondence with Leo.

In 728, Leo sent to Italy a new exarch, Eutychius, to try to retrieve the situation. Eutychius sent an emissary to Rome, with instructions to kill Gregory and the chief nobility in the city, but the plot was uncovered and foiled. Next, he attempted to turn the Lombard king and dukes against the pope, but they retained their ambivalent stance, not committing one way or the other. That same year Gregory wrote to Patriarch Germanus I of Constantinople, giving the patriarch his support, and when Germanus abdicated, Gregory refused to acknowledge the new patriarch, Anastasius, nor the iconoclast rulings of a council summoned by Leo.

In 729, Eutychius finally managed to bring about an alliance with the Lombard king, Liutprand, and both agreed to help the other deal with their rebellious subjects. After they had subjugated the dukes of Spoleto and Benevento, bringing them under Liutprand's authority, they turned to Rome with the intent of bringing Gregory to heel. However, outside Rome, Gregory managed to break up the alliance against him, with Liutprand returning to Pavia. After this, Eutychius reached an uneasy truce with Gregory, and the pope in return forged a temporary truce between the Lombards and the Byzantines. Regardless, Gregory was still a devoted and vigorous defender of the empire. This was demonstrated in 730 when there arose another usurper, Tiberius Petasius, who raised a revolt in Tuscany. He was defeated by the exarch Eutychius, who received steady support from Pope Gregory.

Gregory died on 11 February 731, and was buried in St. Peter's Basilica. The location of his tomb has since been lost. He was subsequently canonized and is commemorated as a saint in the Roman calendar and martyrology on 13 February, although some martyrologies list him under 11 February.

== Miracle at the Battle of Toulouse (721) ==
A miracle concerning Gregory II is linked to the victory over Muslim forces at the Battle of Toulouse in 721. According to the Liber Pontificalis, in 720 Pope Gregory sent to Odo, Duke of Aquitaine, "three blessed sponges/baskets of bread". The Duke kept these, and just before the battle outside of Toulouse, he distributed small portions of these to be eaten by his troops. After the battle, it was reported that no one who had eaten a part of the sponges/baskets of bread had been killed or wounded.

== Literature ==
- Ekonomou, Andrew J. (2007). Byzantine Rome and the Greek Popes: Eastern Influences on Rome and the Papacy from Gregory the Great to Zacharias, A.D. 590–752. Lexington Books.
- Levillain, Philippe, ed. (2002). The Papacy: Gaius-Proxies. Vol. 2. Routledge.
- Mann, Horace K. (1903). The Lives of the Popes in the Early Middle Ages, Vol. I: The Popes Under the Lombard Rule, Part 2, 657–795.
- Treadgold, Warren (1997). A History of the Byzantine State and Society. Standford University Press.
- Bluhme, Friedrich, Liutprandi Leges de Anno XI In: Edictus Langobardorum (1868)
- Bury, John Bagnall, A History of the Later Roman Empire From Arcadius to Irene, Vol. II (1889)
- Herbermann, Charles, ed. (1913). "Pope St. Gregory II" . Catholic Encyclopedia. New York: Robert Appleton Company.
- Paolo Delogu: Gregorio II, santo. In: Massimo Bray (ed.): Enciclopedia dei Papi. Volume 1: Pietro, santo. Anastasio bibliotecario, antipapa. Istituto della Enciclopedia Italiana, Rome 2000, pp. 647–651 (treccani.it).
- Annette Grabowsky: Gregor II. In: Germanische Altertumskunde Online (nur bei De Gruyter Online verfügbarer Artikel mit umfassenden Quellen- und Literaturangaben) 2014.
- Rudolf Schieffer (1989). "Gregor II". Lexikon des Mittelalters, IV: Erzkanzler bis Hiddensee (in German). Stuttgart and Weimar: J. B. Metzler. col. 1666–1667. ISBN 3-7608-8904-2.

Catholic Church titles
Preceded by Constantine	Pope; 715–731	Succeeded by Gregory III
