= Aistulf =

King of the Lombards from 749 to 756

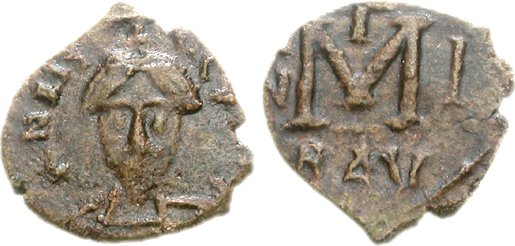
A follis of Aistulf

Aistulf (also Ahistulf, Haistulfus, Astolf etc.; Latin: Aistulfus, Italian: Astolfo; died December 756) was the Duke of Friuli from 744, King of the Lombards from 749, and Duke of Spoleto from 751. His reign was characterized by ruthless and ambitious efforts to conquer Roman territory to the extent that in the Liber Pontificalis, he is described as a "shameless" Lombard given to "pernicious savagery" and cruelty.

Aistulf succeeded his brother Ratchis as duke of Friuli in 744, then became king upon Ratchis's abdication for a monastery in 749. Once king, Aistulf abandoned his predecessor's accommodation of the peninsula's Roman population for a policy of annexation directed against the Papal States and the Eastern Roman exarchate of Ravenna. He captured Ravenna in 750, styled himself king of the Romans, and exacted tribute from the Roman duchy, which led Pope Stephen II to seek protection beyond the Alps. The Frankish king Pepin the Short answered the pontiff's call, besieged Pavia in 755, and extracted a treaty restoring the occupied territories; Aistulf repudiated it the moment the Franks withdrew and then laid siege to Rome. Pepin returned in 756, defeated Aistulf a second time and imposed an annual tribute.

Nine works of Lombard law are attributed to Aistulf—the final additions to the legal corpus begun under Rothari—and address the obligation to bear arms by landed wealth and tighten control of the frontier. No Lombard narrative of the reign survives, and Paul the Deacon's Historia Langobardorum ends with Liutprand's death in 744.

Aistulf died in December 756 of injuries sustained while hunting; when Ratchis left his monastery to reclaim the throne, Desiderius outmaneuvered him and became king in March 757.

== Biography ==
Aistulf was born as the son of Duke Pemmo of Friuli and his wife Ratperga.

After his brother Ratchis became king, Aistulf succeeded him as Duke of Friuli and later succeeded him as king, when Ratchis was forced to abdicate the throne. Ratchis entered a monastery thereafter. While Ratchis had been more tolerant with the Roman element of the Italian population, Aistulf followed a more aggressive policy of expansion and raids against the Papal States and the Eastern Roman exarchate of Ravenna. In 750, Aistulf captured Ravenna and all the provinces subject to the Exarchate, even declaring himself king of the Romans. He also held court in the former palace of the Exarch, where historian Peter Brown asserts, that as a good western Catholic, Aistulf likely offered gifts "on the altar of San Vitale." With the Lombard king close, Rome was under threat and if the city and its Patriarch were to survive, Brown adds, "they had to look for new protectors." Recognizing the religious authority of Pope Stephen II, Aistulf offered peace to the pontiff but under Lombard hegemony. (Note: While the Liber Pontificalis paints a very negative picture of Aistulf as a savage, he did act benevolently towards the Church on occasion. For instance, while he controlled the duchy of Spoleto, he granted the title curtis 'Germaniciana' to the Farfa Abbey, adding substantial lands and prestige to the institution.) In the late spring or summer 751, Aistulf placed Spoleto under his direct control without naming a replacement duke.

Having declared himself the new king of the Romans, Aistulf believed that the empire's former supremacy in Italy was now extinct; as a result, the Roman Pope Stephen was unable to exercise the same pastoral diplomacy that his predecessor, Pope Zachary, had over both Liutprand and Ratchis. (Note: For additional insights into the relationship between Pope Zachary and the latter Lombard leaders, see: Hallenbeck 1980 & Hallenbeck 1982) At Ravenna, Aistulf demanded tribute from the Roman duchy itself, straining papal coffers and greatly worrying Pope Stephen enough that he began negotiations with the Franks.

Aistulf's demands were causing consternation in Rome. In 753, Pope Stephen II crossed the Alps and wintered with the Franks, again petitioning them for assistance against Aistulf's Lombards. Returning from a summer campaign against the Saxons, the Frankish leader, Pepin the Short, learned that the pontiff—accompanied by a large following and bearing gifts—was traveling north to meet with him. While Pope Stephen's arrival in Francia was noteworthy, it was near concomitant with that of Pepin's brother, Carloman, who had incidentally come to Francia under pressure from the Lombard king, Aistulf, to explicitly dissuade Pepin from entering Italy.

Carloman's effort to deter his brother from pursuing Aistulf proved unsuccessful and Pepin, who was accompanied by Pope Stephen, left Francia for Italy during the summer of 754; the ailing Carloman joined them on their journey but died on the way. Pope Stephen had further ingratiated Pepin to his cause by bestowing the title "Patrician of the Romans" onto him and his son, which proved sufficient to elicit Frankish aide and opposition to Aistulf's claims of sovereignty over the Roman empire. Pepin then sent demands to Aistulf for him submit to the patrimony of St. Peter, which meant relinquishing his gains; the Lombard king refused Pepin's demands, thus beginning a Frankish military incursion into Italy.

In the spring of 755, the newly anointed Pepin crossed the Alps at the head of his army, putting the Lombards to flight and forcing Aistulf's hand in returning papal lands and those belonging to the wider Roman res publica that he had occupied. While a treaty was signed between Aistulf and Pepin after the Franks laid siege to Pavia, which included the return of Roman lands and a lasting peace, Aistulf was not long in breaking the treaty once Pepin left Italy. After the Frankish army was back across the Alps, Aistulf besieged Rome again in 756, engendering another plea from the papacy. It read:

I, the Apostle Peter ... who adopted you as my sons ... and who chose you Franks above all other peoples ... I hereby urge and exhort you ... to protect my flock ... defend Rome, and your brothers the Romans, from the heinous Lombards! ... Come, come, in the name of the one living and true God, I beseech you, come and help before the spring of life from which you drink and in which you are reborn dries up, before the last spark of the sacred flame which illuminates you dies out, and before your spiritual mother, God’s holy Church ... is desecrated." (Note: See: Codex Carolinus 10, found in the Monumenta Germaniae Historica Epp. 3, pp. 501–505.)

Once he heard the anxious pleas from the pope, Pepin marched his Frankish army back into Italy, again defeated the Lombards and forced Aistulf to surrender, but this time the Franks directly supervised the land returns. In the midst of these negotiations, a Byzantine ambassador was sent to Pepin with imperial claims over the liberated provinces—part of an attempt to substitute Lombard suzerainty for Byzantine domination—but Pepin refused such offers, allowing the Roman West to retain some autonomy as the Frankish king thought only of the Papacy. Meanwhile, Pepin imposed an annual tribute be paid by the Lombards to the Franks, which historian Paolo Delogu labels nothing less than "political subjection." Despite this blow to Aistulf's prestige, the Lombard kingdom remained more or less intact and as Delogu observes, "the political and military alliance between the Franks and the papacy was not solid enough to allow the latter to act very effectively against the Lombards." When Aistulf died in 756—killed during a hunting accident—his succession was not without controversy when the ex-king Ratchis emerged from his monastery with the intention to reascend to the throne, but the ambitious Desiderius (duke of Tuscany), gained both Frankish and papal support and replaced Aistulf as king of the Lombards in March 757.

Aistulf was buried in the church of San Marino in Pavia, which he founded.

== Legislation ==
Aistulf issued laws as well as waged war. Nine legal provisions are attributed to him, the last additions to the body of Lombard law that Rothari had begun in 643; he promulgated them in 750, within a year of becoming king. His laws set each man's military obligation according to how much land he possessed rather than his social rank. Even the minores homines (men of modest property ownership), were required to equip themselves with at least a shield, a bow, and a quiver of arrows.

Another of his provisions dealt with the kingdom's borders, repeating his brother Ratchis's distrust of travelers. Historians read the border laws of both brothers as a sign that the Lombard kings were growing more anxious about spies and infiltrators as Frankish involvement in Italy increased, and were trying to control who entered and left their territory. While another one of his provisions refers to the people of the Romagna and the exarchate as Romans, reflecting his own legislation; after taking Ravenna, he was making laws for a population that had otherwise merely been imperial subjects.

== Sources and historiography ==
No Lombard account of Aistulf's reign survives. The main narrative source for Lombard Italy is Paul the Deacon's Historia Langobardorum, but its six books end with the death of King Liutprand in 744, five years before Aistulf became king, and the work has neither a conclusion nor a preface. Alone among the early medieval histories of the Germanic kingdoms, it was left unfinished. Historian Walter Goffart argues that Paul most likely died before he could write the closing books, though he may instead have abandoned the project; either way, the narrative stops more than forty years before Paul was writing, and so leaves out the whole Frankish intervention in Italy.

This gap matters because Paul may have seen these events himself. He was educated at Pavia in the 740s under Ratchis, spent a considerable time at the Lombard capital, and may have stayed on there under Aistulf. Aistulf does appear in the Historia, but only as the younger son of Duke Pemmo and only in events before he became king. Paul depicts Aistulf as harsh and impulsive, brusque and violent, in contrast to a diplomatic Ratchis. (Note: Paul mentions Aistulf at H. L. 6.51 and 6.56.)

What remains in the sources concerning Aistulf’s reign itself stems from papal texts and is hostile in disposition. To this end, the Liber Pontificalis supplies both the abuse that has shaped Aistulf's reputation and the report of his death. (Note: Liber pontificalis 94.48, ed. Duchesne, I, 454.) The one source from the Lombard side is found within Aistulf's own legislation, and historians caution that laws are difficult evidence: a law records what a ruler ordered, and there is no way to measure how far it was actually obeyed. Historian Katherine Fischer Drew noted that such laws tend to address unusual situations rather than everyday ones and that Aistulf's rules on weapons and borders therefore show what he wanted enforced, vice what his officials actually achieved.

== Bibliography ==
- Bertolini, Ottorino (1962). "Astolfo, re dei Longobardi". Dizionario Biografico degli Italiani (in Italian). Vol. 4: Arconati–Bacaredda. Rome: Istituto dell'Enciclopedia Italiana. OCLC 883370.
- Brandolini, Cristiano (2023). "Longobard Warriors in the Seprio Judicaria". In Hing Chao; Daniel Jaquet; Loretta Kim (eds.). Martial Culture and Historical Martial Arts in Europe and Asia. Martial Studies. Vol. 2. Singapore: Springer. pp. 73–92. doi:10.1007/978-981-19-2037-0_3. ISBN 978-981-19-2036-3.
- Brown, Peter (2006). The Rise of Western Christendom: Triumph and Diversity, A.D. 200–1000. Malden, MA: Blackwell Publishing. ISBN 978-0-69116-177-8.
- Collins, Roger (1999). Early Medieval Europe, 300–1000. New York: St. Martin’s Press. ISBN 978-0-31221-885-0.
- Costambeys, Marios (2007). Power and Patronage in Early Medieval Italy: Local Society, Italian Politics and the Abbey of Farfa, c.700–900. Cambridge; New York: Cambridge University Press. ISBN 978-0-52187-037-5.
- Delogu, Paolo (2006). "Lombard and Carolingian Italy". In Rosamond McKitterick (ed.). The New Cambridge Medieval History, c.700–c.900. Vol. II. Cambridge; New York: Cambridge University Press. ISBN 978-0-52136-292-4.
- Drew, Katherine Fischer (1973). The Lombard Laws. Philadelphia: University of Pennsylvania Press. ISBN 978-0-81221-055-2.
- Fouracre, Paul (2006). "Frankish Gaul to 814". In Rosamond McKitterick (ed.). The New Cambridge Medieval History, c.700–c.900. Vol. II. Cambridge; New York: Cambridge University Press. ISBN 978-0-52136-292-4.
- Frassetto, Michael (2003). Encyclopedia of Barbarian Europe: Society in Transformation. Santa Barbara, CA: ABC-CLIO. ISBN 978-1-57607-263-9.
- Fried, Johannes (2015). The Middle Ages. Cambridge and London: The Belknap Press of Harvard University Press. ISBN 978-0-67405-562-9.
- Giostra, Caterina; Lusuardi Siena, Maria Silvia; Spalla, Elena (2000). "Sepolture e luoghi di culto in età longobarda: il modello regio". In Gian Pietro Brogiolo (ed.). Atti del II Congresso Nazionale di Archeologia medievale. Brescia: Società degli Archeologi Medievalisti Italiani. ISBN 978-8-87814-171-1.
- Goffart, Walter (1988). The Narrators of Barbarian History (A.D. 550–800): Jordanes, Gregory of Tours, Bede, and Paul the Deacon. Princeton: Princeton University Press. ISBN 0-691-05514-9.
- Hallenbeck, Jan T. (1980). "Instances of Peace in Eighth-Century Lombard-Papal Relations". Archivum Historiae Pontificiae. 18: 41–56. JSTOR 23564026. INIST 12600309.
- Hallenbeck, Jan T. (1982). "Pavia and Rome: The Lombard Monarchy and the Papacy in the Eighth Century". Transactions of the American Philosophical Society. 72 (4): 1–186. doi:10.2307/1006429. JSTOR 1006429. INIST 12327704.
- Heath, Christopher (2021). "Aspects of Movement and Mobility in Lombard Law: Fugitives, Runaway Slaves and Strangers". Medieval Worlds (13): 12–35. doi:10.1553/medievalworlds_no13_2021s12.
- Hodgkin, Thomas (1892). Italy and Her Invaders, 744–774. Vol. VII, Frankish Invasions. Oxford: Clarendon Press. OCLC 11903416.
- McKitterick, Rosamond (1983). The Frankish Kingdoms under the Carolingians, 751–987. London: Longman. ISBN 0-582-49005-7.
- Nelson, Janet (2019). King and Emperor: A New Life of Charlemagne. Oakland: University of California Press. ISBN 978-0-52031-420-7.

=== Further reading ===
- Jarnut, Jörg (1995) [1982]. Storia dei Longobardi. Translated by Guglielmotti, Paola. Torino: Einaudi. ISBN 88-06-13658-5.
- Sergio Rovagnati, I Longobardi, Milan, Xenia, 2003. ISBN 88-7273-484-3
- Ottorino Bertolini (1892-1977), Astolfo, pp. 246/247

Regnal titles
Preceded by Ratchis	Duke of Friuli; 744–749	Succeeded by Anselm
Preceded by Ratchis	King of the Lombards; 749–756	Succeeded by Desiderius
Preceded by Unnolf	Duke of Spoleto; 751–756	Succeeded by Alboin
