= Liutprand, King of the Lombards =

King of the Lombards from 712 to 744

Liutprand
- King of the Lombards
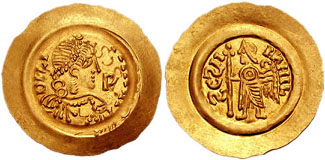
- A tremissis with Liutprand's effigy
- Reign: 712–744
- Predecessor: Ansprand
- Successor: Hildeprand
- Born: c. 680
- Died: 744; Pavia, Lombard Kingdom
- Burial: San Pietro in Ciel d'Oro
- Religion: Chalcedonian Christianity

Liutprand was king of the Lombards from 712 to 744. He is chiefly remembered for his multiple phases of law-giving, in fifteen separate sessions from 713 to 735 inclusive, and his long reign, which brought him into a series of conflicts, mostly successful, with most of Italy. Liutprand is often regarded as the most successful Lombard monarch, notable for the Donation of Sutri in 728, which was the first accolade of sovereign territory to the Papacy.

== Early life ==
Liutprand's life began inauspiciously. His father was driven to exile among the Bavarians, his older brother Sigipert was blinded by Aripert II, king of the Lombards, and his mother Theodarada and sister Aurona were mutilated (their noses and ears were cut off). Liutprand was spared only because his youth made him appear harmless, described as adolescens in Paul the Deacon's Historia Langobardorum (Book VI, xxii), suggesting that he was 'probably older than 19 but still in his twenties'. He was released from Aripert II's custody and allowed to join his father. (Note: Also see: "Liutprand, King of the Lombards", The British Museum)

== Reign ==
The reign of Liutprand occurred in the wake of his overthrow of Aripert II, and officially began just before his father Ansprand's death. Liutprand ruled for thirty-one years and was seen as an aggressive leader, who immediately upon ascension to the throne, moved against the Byzantine exarchate; he likewise attacked Ravenna, destroyed Classe, occupied forts in Bologna as well as Osimo, and captured Sutri. Strategic considerations in mind, Liutprand maintained an alliance with the more "powerfully organized" nation of the Franks.

Through his assertive actions, Liutprand greatly expanded the boundaries of the Lombard kingdom, as he attempted to bring the entirety of the Italian Peninsula under his control in much the way Charles Martel had. He enjoyed success against the Byzantines and the papacy alike. His improvements to the royal bureaucracy, more effective administration of justice across the Lombard realm, military actions, and competent rule left an important legacy for the Lombards.

=== Relations with the Agilolfings of Bavaria ===
Due to their location just north of Italy, the Bavarians made valuable allies for the Lombards. There were already royal marriage ties to both peoples going back to c. 590, when the Lombard king Authari was betrothed to Theodelinda, the Bavarian Garibald's daughter—of the Agilolfing family. At the opening of Liutprand's reign in 712, relations between the Lombard kingdom and Bavaria were good, rendering one of his chief allies the Agilolfing Theodo I, effectively the Frankish duke of Bavaria. Consequently, Liutprand took to wife the young Agilolfing, Guntrud, in 715.

=== Byzantine wars ===
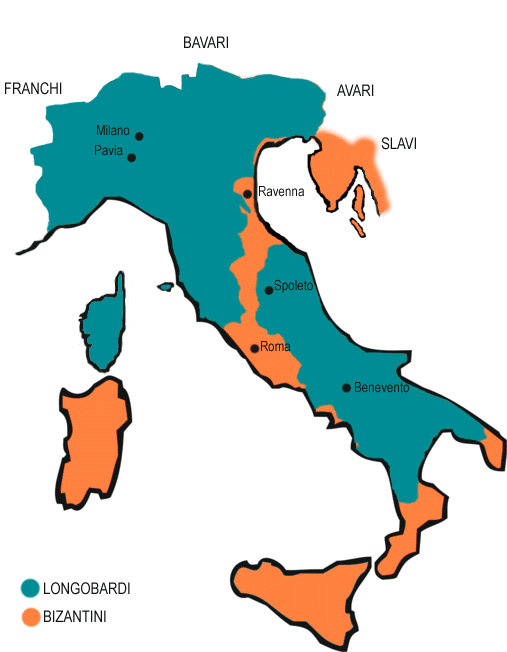
Italy after the conquests of Liutprand. Lombard territory is shown in green, Byzantine territory in orange.

Prior to Liutprand's reign, the Byzantines had made "the political borders within Italy definitive" via a treaty in c.680. However, the peace the Lombards had otherwise enjoyed came to an end during his rule, when Byzantines encountered a crisis of their authority inside Italy and began challenging Lombard legitimacy.

Liutprand did not at first attack the Exarchate of Ravenna or the Papacy in the midst of these challenges. But in 726, the Emperor Leo III made his first of many edicts outlawing images or icons (see the iconoclastic controversy), but this had little practical effect at the time. The pope, Gregory II, refused to comply and likewise "refused to recognize the emperor in his official correspondence". Pope Gregory may have even seen Liutprand as an ally, since not only had Liutprand refused bribes from the exarch Paul at Ravenna, but he "cultivated the image of a liberator" and as a result, there was "considerable warmth and solidarity" between the pontiff and the Lombard monarch.

Liutprand chose this time of division between the Roman power-brokers to strike the Byzantine possessions in Emilia. In 727, he crossed the Po and took Bologna, Osimo, Rimini and Ancona, along with the other cities of Emilia and the Pentapolis. Authorities in these places "spontaneously" offered their submission to Liutprand. The Lombard king also took Classis, the seaport of Ravenna, but could not take Ravenna itself. (Note: While there was no permanent occupation of Ravenna, it seems possible that the city was at least temporarily under the Lombard king's control in 728, according to historian Judith Herrin. During the mid-730s, Liutprand again more certainly occupied Ravenna, if only for a brief period.)

=== Donation of Sutri and Papal acquiescence ===
In 727, Liutprand entered Rome and seized the fortress of Sutri along the Via Cassia near the Lombard border at Tuscany. Alarmed by the Lombards possession of Sutri, Pope Gregory II entreated Liutprand with a "deluge" of money and gifts for a period of some four months before Liutprand assented and gave Sutri over to the Papacy in 728, all the while maintaining control of the nearby district. Historian Jan Hallenbeck surmises that Liutprand occupied Sutri either for the sake of extorting money from the papacy to defer the financial costs of his military campaigns, or it was part of his offensive in central Italy against Byzantine imperial territory. Hallenbeck adds that neither possibility is "mutually exclusive" nor were they especially "certain", but the Lombard king's capture of Sutri did nothing "to disturb the positive relationship between Pavia and Rome" established "earlier in the century". Much fanfare accompanied Liutprand's gift of Sutri—when the king symbolically marched his army to Camp Neronis and laid down his royal insignia, garments, cloak, belt, sword, golden crown and silver cross before Pope Gregory II, which the pontiff ceremoniously handed back in a gesture of acknowledgment to the Lombard monarch's mastery of northern Italy. Shortly thereafter, Liutprand ventured to the Greek monastery of St. Anastosios, a visit which is recorded in a Latin inscription "at the king's foundation at Corteolona.

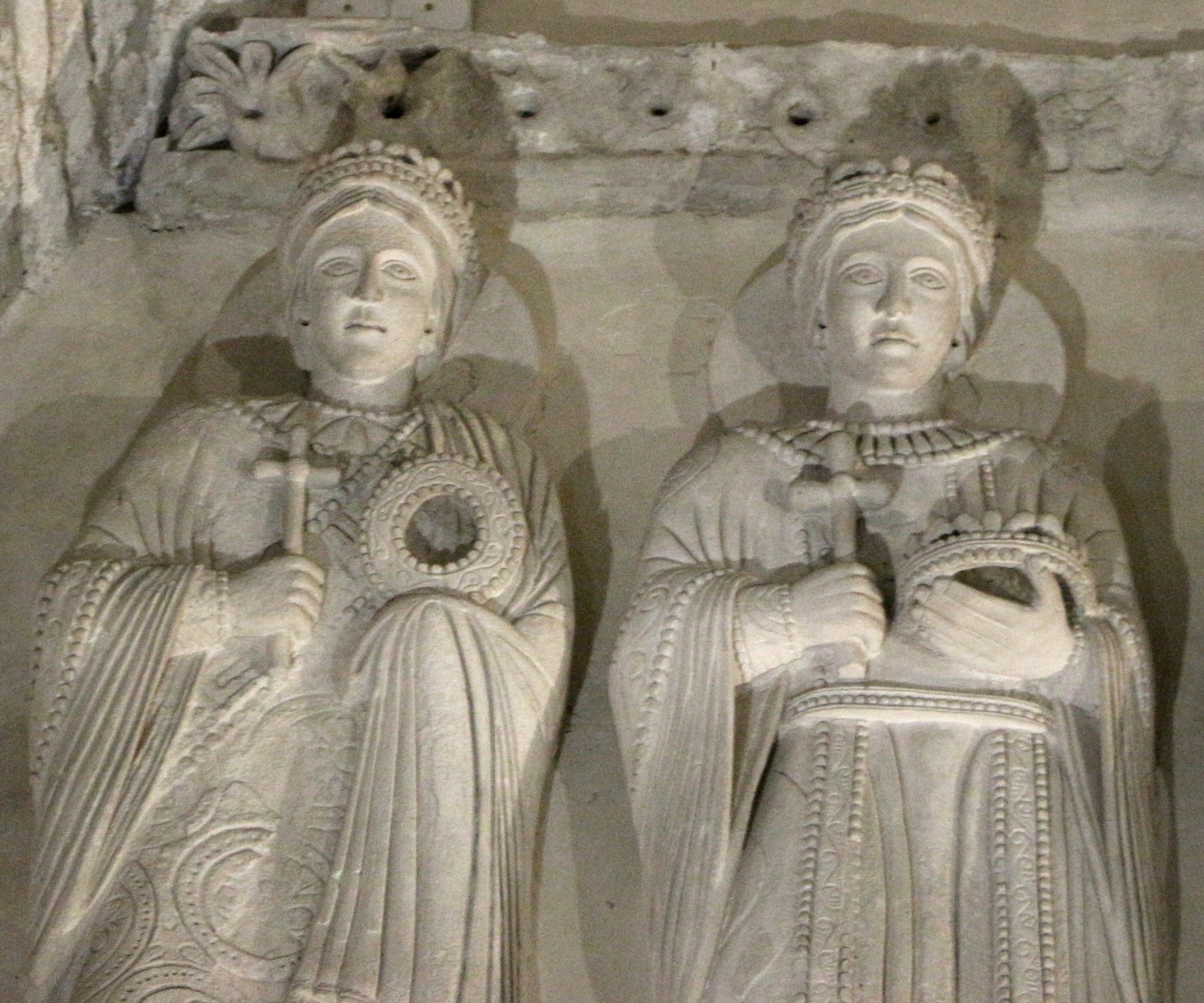
Two longobard women in the Tempietto longobardo of Cividale, a masterpiece of the patronage of Liutprando in his "Cappella Palatina"

After handing over Sutri and participating in symbolic motions, Liutprand "effected a surprising diplomatic revolution" by accepting gifts and money from Eutychius, the Exarch of Ravenna, becoming his ally; an event described as a "wicked" arrangement by Gregory II's biographer. This agreement gave the appearance that the Lombard monarch wanted to help Eutychius deal with the independent southern Lombard duchies at Spoleto and Benevento, respectively ruled by the dukes, Thrasimund II and Godescalc. However, Hallenbeck postulates it is more likely that by making an ally of Eutychius, Liutprand was checking the power of the papacy and ensuring the exarch would not make trouble for him on the Adriatic; to this end, Liutprand more or less used Eutychius to restore the Lombard kingdom of Italy.

Following these events, Liutprand and Eutychius led a combined campaign to the gates of Rome but once there, the Lombard king had a change of heart and submitted to Pope Gregory II. He subsequently convinced the pontiff he meant no harm and persuaded both Eutychius and Gregory II to "dwell" in harmony with one another. Hallenbeck explains the ramifications of this development for Liutprand and the papacy alike:

...the new Lombard kingdom and the Roman political entity were to coexist in harmony as separate and independent states. But Liutprand evidently went further, trying to indicate that he still supported the papacy against Byzantium. That seems to have been the meaning of the king's successful effort to achieve some form of reconciliation of Exarch Eutychius and Gregory. Liutprand not only refrained from aiding Eutychius against the pope as he had promised but also sponsored the reconciliation, which obviously benefited Gregory in that it eased the deep papal-imperial division and, since it involved no papal submission to the empire, suggested a measure of imperial acquiescence in Rome's separation from Byzantium and emergent autonomy in Rome and the duchy. In sum, far from threatening the papacy, Liutprand was clearly promoting conditions which offered positive benefits and peace with the new Lombard Kingdom of Italy.

=== Sardinia and the remains of Augustine ===
When the Saracens invaded Sardinia, Liutprand had the relics of Augustine brought to the northern Italian city of Pavia. (Note: According to Paul the Deacon, Liutprand rescued the relics stationed on the island with great haste as well as with great expense. Augustine's remains were enshrined in the Church of Saint Peter there. See the following website: http://www.augnet.org/en/history/places/4236-italy-pavia/)

=== Papal negotiations ===
Pope Gregory II died in 731 and was succeeded by Pope Gregory III. Relations between the new pope and Liutprand were peaceful at first, but Gregory III soon changed course and made agreements with Duke Ursus of Venetia and the Patriarch Antoninus of Grado, who then expelled the Lombards from Ravenna and restored the seat for Eutychius. A partial breakdown of peace across Italy was the result and Liutprand's power receded to only the "customary Lombard realm of the north and the newer royal districts of the exarchate and the Pentapolis". Hostilities ensued between various ducal powers aligned with the pope and the Lombards; when things appeared especially perilous for the papacy, Gregory III appealed to Charles Martel for help, but the pope's appeals fell on deaf ears since the Frankish king and Liutprand remained in close contact and amicable with one another as kinsmen. (Note: Liutprand and Charles Martel kept friendly relations—to the degree that the Lombard monarch adopted the Frankish king's son, Pepin the Short.) Just as the Lombard ruler prepared to make an assault on Rome again, Pope Gregory III died.

Soon after the death of Pope Gregory III (741), Liutprand was once again at Rome's doorstep, and neither the Byzantines nor the Franks "seemed likely to send forces to relieve the city". The new pontiff, Zachary, began negotiations with the Lombard king and signed a twenty-year peace. Zachary attained a diplomatic success, re-acquiring four towns recently captured by the Lombards simply by agreeing to Liutprand's demand not to align with the dukes of Spoleto or Benevento. Through his arrangement with Liutprand, Pope Zachary had seized some of the territories that would later become the Papal States. Sometime later, Pope Zachary again met with Liutprand and was ceded additional land around Ravenna and two-third of Cesena adjacent to the Apennine Mountains.

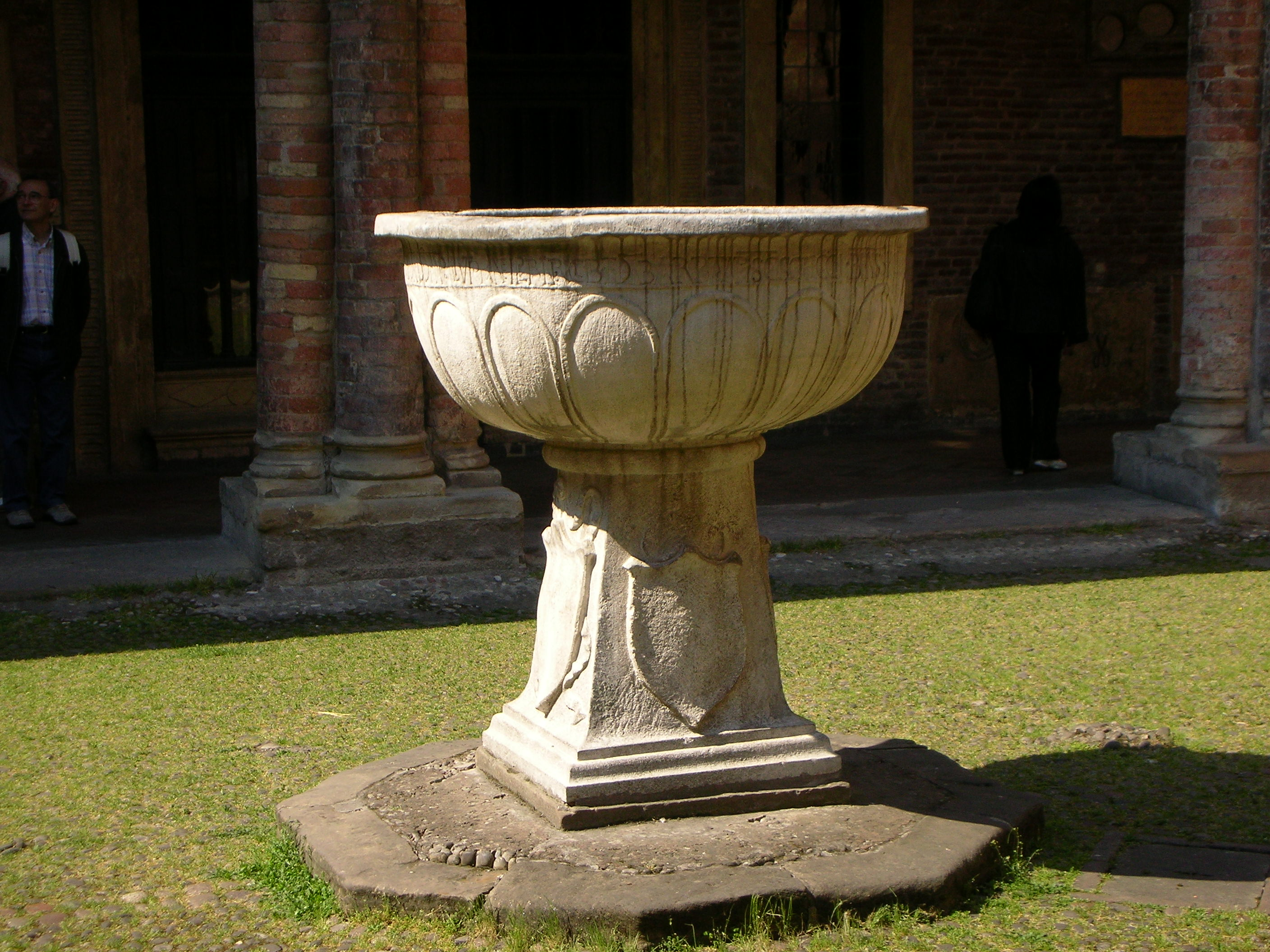
So-called "Pilatus' basin", in the middle of the so-called "Pilatus' Courtyard" of Santo Stefano in Bologna. This eighth-century Lombard sculpture bears the names of kings Liutprand and Ilprand, as well as of the bishop Barbatus of Bologna.

=== Lawmaking ===
Along with Rothari, Liutprand is the other major Lombard figure whose legal legacy is recognized today. Liutprand's laws (Liutprandi Leges) show a greater degree of Roman influence than do the laws of his predecessors. To this end, Liutprand was known for establishing commonsense laws and during his kingship—at least nominally speaking, according to historian Chris Wickham—he did his best to ensure that the application of law was conducted "in the presence of the whole people, in common counsel with us". Many of the laws promulgated by Liutprand "depict the model of an ideal state, based on political ideas" in keeping with Germanic ideals of the people participating in governing their nation, so claims historian Paolo Delogu.

Such governance centered around the notion of free Lombards in solidarity with the king and included the incorporation of judges from across the entire Lombard kingdom. (Note: Using Liutprand as an example, historian Chris Wickham likewise explains that legitimacy for these early medieval Germanic kings rested on their "links with the entire free (male) people of their kingdoms.") Delogu adds that military service to the state and representation in its defense "was considered as the most complete and honourable form of freedom, whereby the free-born cooperated in maintaining both order and justice within the kingdom, and its independence or superiority with respect to other peoples." Thereby, solidarity to and with the king was "reinforced" by a sworn personal oath of fidelity. Justice itself was administered for all Lombards under the subordination and authority of king Liuprand.

Liutprand's legislation did not depend upon the prior models of Germanic tradition, whereby clienteles around powerful regional persons exercised public functional authority, but centered instead around the king's reign. Such changes do not imply a simplification of Lombard legal codices, as Liutprand's lawmaking was quite detailed. For example, one code took into consideration things like penalties for a man taking a woman's clothes while she bathed, making the perpetrator pay a full wirigild as if he had killed somebody. Some of Liutprand's laws make it clear that Romans and Lombards lived in relative harmony, since one statute (Liutprand 127) mandated that Lombard women who married Romans were obligated to obey Roman laws. Additional legislation covering various charters, wills, forgeries, property sales, and inheritance disputes were commonplace. His pragmatic law-making proved so effective that after 774, the Franks borrowed many of their legal procedures from them.

== Death and legacy ==
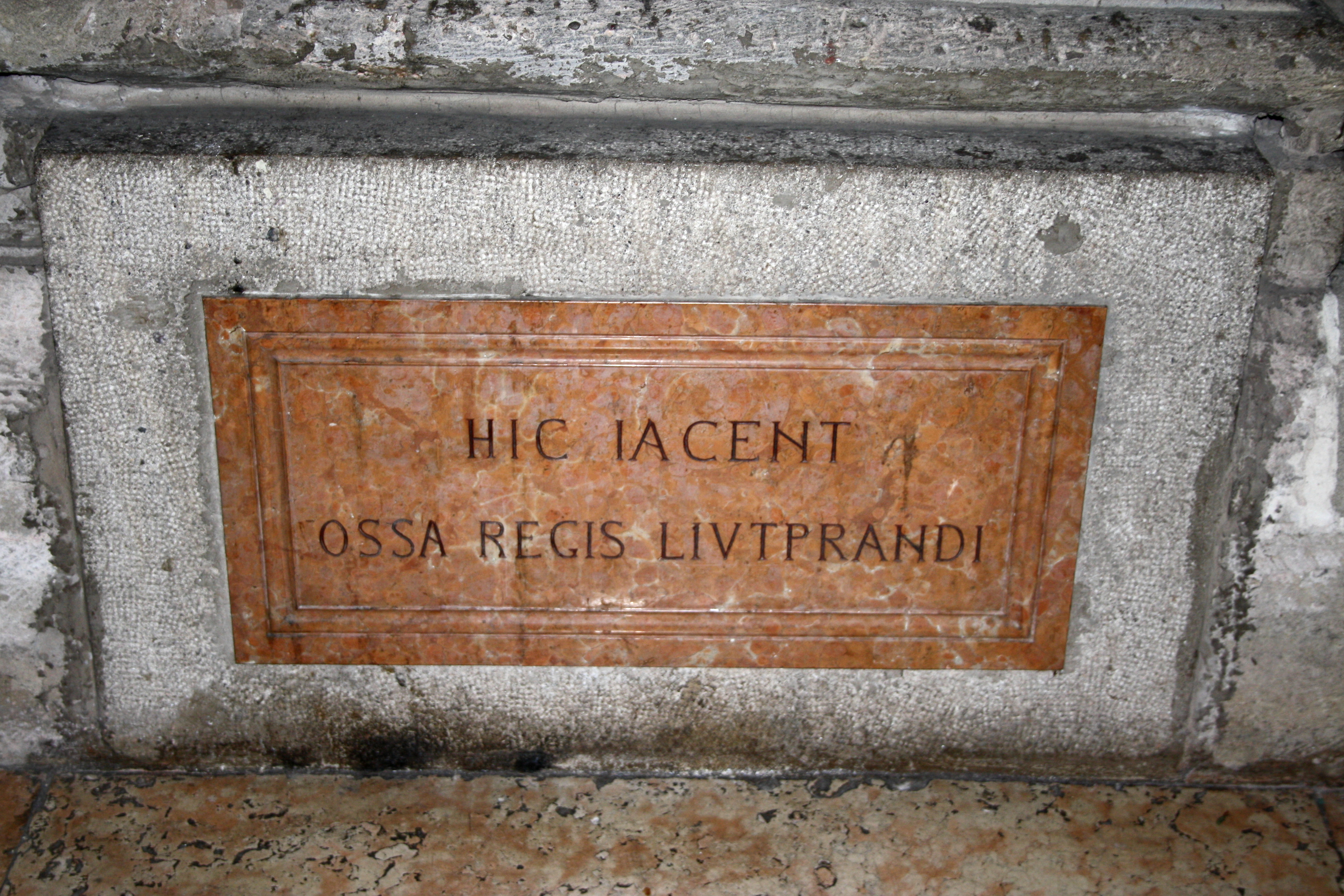
Plaque marking the casket containing Liutprand's bones in San Pietro in Ciel d'Oro in Pavia

According to historian Chris Wickham, Liutprand was "the most powerful Lombard king" and by the time of his death in 744, he possessed "hegemonic" power across the "entire peninsula". His successors included the Ratchis brothers, Aistulf, Desiderius, and Arichis, none of whom—despite some successes—ruled for as long or controlled equivalent territory. Liuprand's death inaugurated a brief respite in Lombard activity but Ratchis went on campaign to capture the castle at Perugia—a fortification along the military road linking Rome and Ravenna—when Pope Zachary's intervention proved so effective that the Lombard king soon gave up the crown and retreated to a monastic life. in 749, Ratchis was replaced by Aistulf, who led the Lombards on aggressive campaigns that included possessing Ravenna. Still the heritage of Liutprand and his Lombard successors was one that historian Herwig Wolfram avows "prepared the ground for the creation of a medieval Italian nation" for it was none other than the Lombards who "preserved it as a political entity notwithstanding...territorial losses and secessions." So prominent were the Lombards because of kings like Liutprand that even the great Carolingian ruler Charlemagne included in his title "king of the Franks and Lombards" and the region the Lombards occupied between Milan and Pavia in the 8th century is still called Lombardy to this day.

=== Possible archaeological remains of Liutprand ===
In 2018, the purported remains of King Liutprand underwent bio-archaeological and genetic analysis. The results identified three high-status individuals exhibiting pronounced musculature and a protein-rich diet—particularly meat and fish—distinct from patterns observed in comparative Lombard-period necropoleis in northern Italy. Of these three individuals, two (a middle-aged man and a younger man) date back to the 6th century, while the third subject, who died around 40/50 years old, was a contemporary of Liutprand; scholars correspondingly suggest it is "possible" that the bones of the third individual belong to the Lombard king.

== Sources ==
The main source for the career of Liutprand is the Historia Langobardorum of Paul the Deacon, which idealizes Liutprand. It was written after 787 and covers the story of the Lombards from 568 to the death of Liutprand in 744. Though written by a Lombard from a Lombard point of view, it contains much information about the Eastern Roman Empire, the Franks, and others.

== Bibliography ==
- Balzaretti, Ross (2005). "Masculine Authority and State Identity in Liutprandic Italy". In Pohl, Walter; Erhart, Peter (eds.). Die Langobarden: Herrschaft und Identität. Austrian Academy of the Sciences. pp. 361–382. ISBN 978-3-70013-400-8.
- Bauer, Susan Wise (2010). The History of the Medieval World: From the Conversion of Constantine to the First Crusade. New York: W. W. Norton & Company. ISBN 978-0-39305-975-5.
- Christie, Neil (1998). The Lombards: The Ancient Longobards. Malden, MA: Blackwell. ISBN 0-631-18238-1.
- Collins, Roger (1999). Early Medieval Europe, 300–1000. New York: St. Martin’s Press. ISBN 978-0-31221-885-0.
- Delogu, Paolo (2006). "Lombard and Carolingian Italy". In Rosamond MicKitterick (ed.). The New Cambridge Medieval History. Vol. II [c.700–c.900]. Cambridge; New York: Cambridge University Press. pp. 290–319. ISBN 978-0-52136-292-4.
- Everett, Nicholas (2000). "Literacy and the Law in Lombard Government". Early Medieval Europe. 9 (1): 93–127. doi:10.1111/1468-0254.00061.
- Frassetto, Michael (2003). Encyclopedia of Barbarian Europe: Society in Transformation. Santa Barbara, CA: ABC-CLIO. ISBN 978-1-57607-263-9.
- Gaetal, Raffaele; Minozzil, Simona; Fornaciaril, Antonio; Giuffral, Valentina; Riccomil, Giulia; Lubritto, Carmine; Fornaciari, Gino (2020). "Exhumation and Anthropological Study of the Skeletal Remains Attributed to Liutprand, King of the Lombards (c. 690-744 AD)". Medicina Historica. 4 (2): 1–7.
- Ghosh, Shami (2015). Writing the Barbarian Past: Studies in Early Medieval Historical Narrative. Brill. ISBN 978-9-00430-522-9.
- Hallenbeck, Jan T. (1982). "Pavia and Rome: The Lombard Monarchy and the Papacy in the Eighth Century". Transactions of the American Philosophical Society. 72 (4): 1–186. doi:10.2307/1006429.
- Heath, Christopher (2021). "Morbidity and Murder. Lombard Kingship's Violent Uncertainties 568–774". In Christopher Heath; Robert Houghton (eds.). Conflict and Violence in Medieval Italy, 568–1154. Amsterdam: Amsterdam University Press. pp. 63–86. ISBN 978-9-04853-620-7.
- Herrin, Judith (1989). The Formation of Christendom. Princeton, NJ: Princeton University Press. ISBN 0-691-00831-0.
- Herrin, Judith (2020). Ravenna: Capital of Empire, Crucible of Europe. Princeton and Oxford: Princeton University Press. ISBN 978-0-69115-343-8.
- Kaldellis, Anthony (2024). The New Roman Empire: A History of Byzantium. Oxford and New York: Oxford University Press. ISBN 978-0-19754-932-2.
- McKitterick, Rosamond (2004). History and Memory in the Carolingian World. Cambridge and New York: Cambridge University Press. ISBN 978-0-52182-717-1.
- Nelson, Janet (2019). King and Emperor: A New Life of Charlemagne. Oakland: University of California Press. ISBN 978-0-52031-420-7.
- Palmer, James (2015). The Apocalypse in the Early Middle Ages. Cambridge and New York: Cambridge University Press. ISBN 1107085446.
- Paul the Deacon (2003). History of the Lombards. Translated by William Dudley Foulke. Philadelphia: University of Pennsylvania Press. ISBN 0-8122-1079-4.
- Riché, Pierre (1993). The Carolingians: A Family Who Forged Europe. Translated by Michael Idomir Allen. Philadelphia: University of Pennsylvania Press. ISBN 978-0-81221-342-3.
- Sommar, Mary E. (2020). The Slaves of the Churches: A History. Oxford; New York: Oxford University Press. ISBN 978-0-19007-328-2.
- Wickham, Chris (2009). The Inheritance of Rome: Illuminating the Dark Ages, 400–1000. Viking. ISBN 978-0-67002-098-0.
- Wickham, Chris (2016). Medieval Europe. New Haven and London: Yale University Press. ISBN 978-0-30020-834-4.
- Wolfram, Herwig (1997). The Roman Empire and its Germanic Peoples. Berkeley and Los Angeles: University of California Press. ISBN 0-520-08511-6.

Regnal titles
Preceded by Ansprand	King of the Lombards; 712–744	Succeeded by Hildeprand
