= King John =

King John may refer to:

== Rulers ==
- John, King of England (1166–1216)
- John of Brienne (c. 1170–1237), king of Jerusalem
- John Balliol (c. 1249–1314), king of Scotland
- John, King of Bohemia and titular King of Poland (1296–1346)
- John I of France (15–20 November 1316)
- John II of France (1319–1364)
- John I of Aragon (1350–1396)
- John I of Castile (1358–1390)
- John II of Aragon (1398–1479)
- John II of Castile (1405–1454)
- John, King of Denmark, Norway and Sweden (1455–1513)
- John, King of Saxony (1801–1873)
- John of Poland (disambiguation), various kings
- John of Portugal (disambiguation), various kings
- John of Sweden (disambiguation), various kings

== Other people ==
- Murlawirrapurka, an Aboriginal man in colonial South Australia known as "King John"; see Rymill Park

== Drama ==
- King John (play), a play by William Shakespeare
- King John (film), an 1899 British silent film
- King John (2015 film), a production of CBC Presents the Stratford Festival
- Kynge Johan, a play by John Bale
- The Life and Death of King John (1984), on BBC Television Shakespeare

== See also ==
- John (disambiguation) § Rulers and other political figures
- John I (disambiguation)
- John II (disambiguation)
- John III (disambiguation)
- John IV (disambiguation)
- John V (disambiguation)
- John VI (disambiguation)
- John VII (disambiguation)
- John VIII (disambiguation)
- John IX (disambiguation)
