= Ioannes (given name) =

Ioannes is a given name. Notable people with the name include:

- Ioannes (fl. 423–425), a Roman usurper
- Ioannes Kegen, a Pecheneg military commander
- Ioannes I (disambiguation)
- Ioannes II (disambiguation)
- Ioannes III (disambiguation)
- Ioannes IV (disambiguation)
- Ioannes V (disambiguation)
- Ioannes VI (disambiguation)
- Ioannes VII (disambiguation)
- Ioannes VIII (disambiguation)

== See also ==
- John (given name)
- Johannes
- Yohannes
- Hovhannes
