= Byzantine–Lombard wars =

568–750 wars on the Italian Peninsula

- Part of the Barbarian invasions
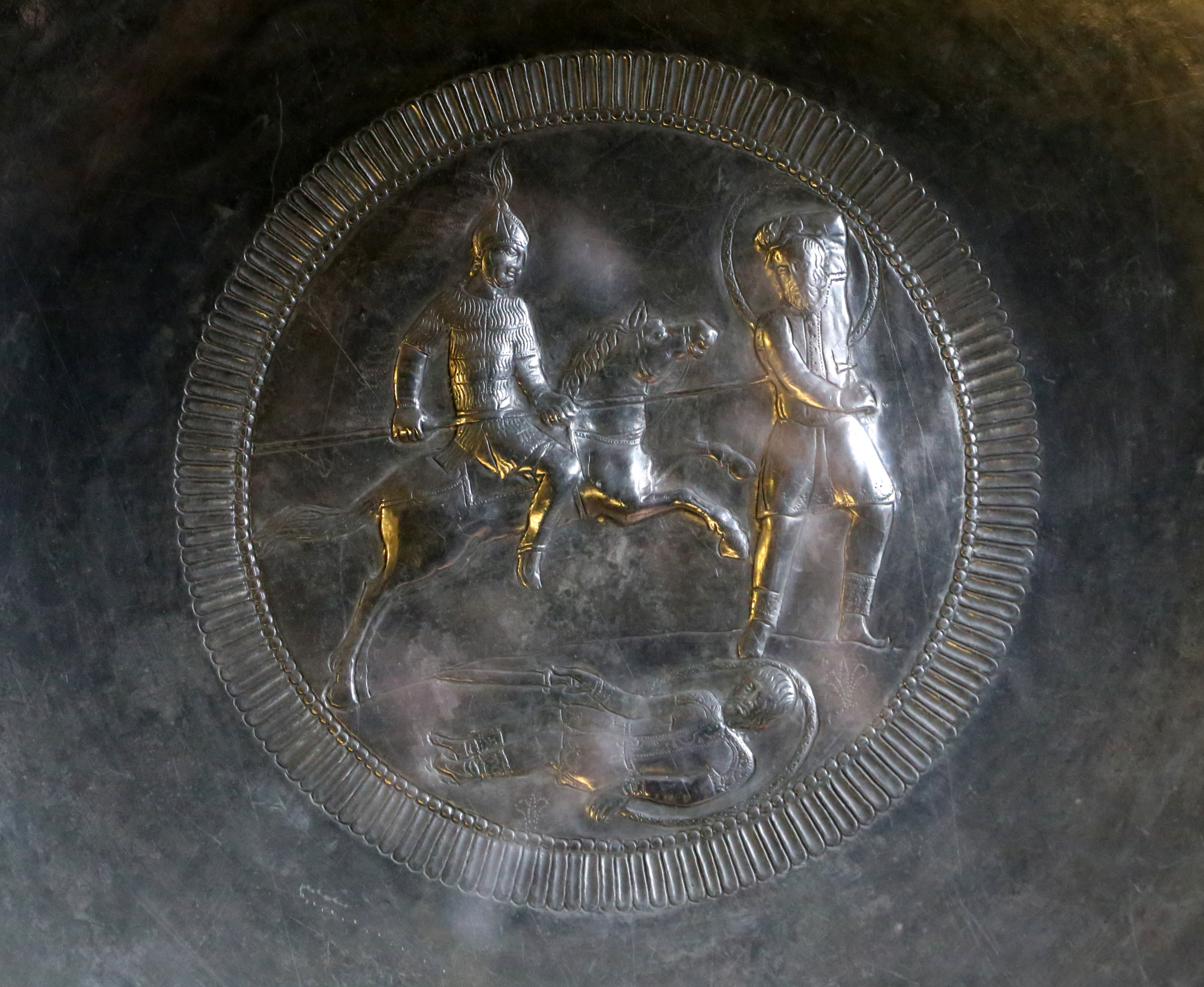
- Contemporary scene from the Isola Rizza dish
Date	568 – 750
Location	Italian Peninsula
Result	Inconclusive
Territorial changes	Lombardic conquest of the Exarchate of Ravenna; Byzantine Empire retains southern Italy

Belligerents
Lombards	Byzantine Empire

Commanders and leaders
Alboin; Gisulf I of Friuli	Smaragdus; Callinicus; Eutychius

The Byzantine–Lombard wars were a protracted series of conflicts which occurred from AD 568 to 750 between the Byzantine Empire and a Germanic tribe known as the Lombards. The wars began primarily because of the imperialistic inclinations of the Lombard king Alboin, as he sought to take possession of Northern Italy. The conflicts ended in a Byzantine defeat, as the Lombards were able to secure large parts of Northern Italy at first, eventually conquering the Exarchate of Ravenna in 750.

== Invasion of Northern Italy ==
The Lombards began the invasion of Northern Italy on Easter Monday, 568. The Lombards chose this date to ensure that the migrations were to be undertaken through the guidance of their gods. The Lombards migrated into Italy whilst fighting meagre resistance from the Byzantine border forces known as the Milites Limitanei, which were remnants from the Imperial Roman military organisation. The Lombards managed to annex Northern Italy quickly. Cividale del Friuli, the first town to be captured, was established as the capital of the Duchy of Friuli, with Alboin's nephew Gisulf reigning as its first Duke. Following the immediate success of the invasion of Northern Italy and the capture of Friuli, the Lombards began to turn eastward towards Venice. The army captured Aquileia, before undertaking many acts of destruction against the population of the city, leading many civilians to migrate to other areas in Southern Italy.

== Aftermath ==
Apart from the Hellenized south (Naples, Calabria and Sicily), the Lombards had overrun Italy within the first generation except for Venice and Istria in the northeast, and Rome, Ravenna and the Pentapolis in Central Italy. Perugia served as the last remaining channel connecting the major centers Ravenna and Rome. Although the Byzantine emperors initially intended to defend Italy with seasoned Eastern troops and barbarian contingents from the Balkans, the increasing military pressures on the Arab and Slavic fronts led imperial authorities to leave Italy to the defence of locally-recruited troops. Eventually, imperial policy of self-reliance in Italy led to the rise of a new Italian military aristocracy who also dominated civilian offices; these aristocrats were drawn from landholders in Italy who often leased their lands from the Church of Rome or of Ravenna. Moreover, apart from their strong economic partnership with the Italian landholders, the Papacy also came to provide most public services from entertainment, public health and water supply to the judicial system. Meanwhile, the Byzantine emperors' aggressive promotion of Monophysitism and Monothelitism (for example, in their humiliation, torture and fatal exile of Pope Martin I for his refusal to compromise on doctrine) alienated the Italian military aristocracy and revealed the fragility of Italian loyalty to the Empire.

In 717/718, towards the end of the Byzantine-Lombard conflict, Lombard Duke Romuald II of Benevento captured Cumae in the south of the Duchy of Rome. Pope Gregory II was left to organize a counter-offensive, calling on help from Duke John I of Naples and Theodimus, rector of Papal patrimonies in Campania, to drive the Lombards out of the Duchy. Romuald agreed to receive a payment from the Pope to leave the city, but from then on the Popes began to regard Cumae like their own patrimonies. This was the first instance of the Papacy mobilizing their own defenses and establishing ownership of formerly public Imperial land. In 722/723, Emperor Leo III, having successfully repelled the Arabs in the Arab-Byzantine wars, decided to make Italy pay a greater share of the defense against the Lombards. Leo dramatically increased Imperial taxation on all estates in Italy, including Papal properties, which Pope Gregory II refused to pay. Leo's Doux of Rome Marinus plotted but failed to assassinate Pope Gregory, and the Emperor's Exarch Paul also tried to attack Rome but failed against determined resistance from Rome and Lombards. The loss of Byzantine control over Rome was exacerbated by Leo's new policy of Iconoclasm, which led to the military leadership of Venice, Ravenna, and the Pentapolis rising up to defend the Pope from the Emperor. King Liutprand of the Lombards, either seeing the opportunity for gain or sympathetic to the anti-Iconoclast effort, declared himself an ally of the Pope and attacked the remaining Imperial cities, some of which welcomed him as a liberator.

With the decline of Byzantine defenses in Italy, the Papacy played an increasingly assertive role in resisting against the Lombards, such as calling on the Venetians to repel the Lombards from Ravenna in 738/739. Pope Gregory III struck an alliance with the rebellious southern Lombard duchies against King Liutprand, and began asserting Papal territorial claims over the Duchy of Rome (and later, Ravenna as well) separately from the claims of the Byzantine Empire. As a result of this "Italianization" process of Byzantine Italy, the Papacy would define their territory as a "holy republic" of "peculiar people" who were the pope's "flocks", distinct from the Byzantine Empire.

The fall of the Exarchate of Ravenna led Pope Stephen II to request Emperor Constantine V for military aid to drive the Lombards out. However, Constantine, who was committed to reconquering Byzantine territory elsewhere, only sent envoys to the Lombards and ordered the Pope to negotiate with the Lombards. Pope Stephen, unable to dissuade the rapidly expanding Lombards, therefore sought protection from the Frankish Kingdom. Pope Stephen's alliance with the Franks realigned the Papacy away from Byzantium and toward Germanic northern Europe, thus laying the foundations for the creation of the Holy Roman Empire.
