= 615 =

Calendar year

615 in various calendars
- Gregorian calendar: 615; DCXV
- Ab urbe condita: 1368
- Armenian calendar: 64; ԹՎ ԿԴ
- Assyrian calendar: 5365
- Balinese saka calendar: 536–537
- Bengali calendar: 21–22
- Berber calendar: 1565
- Buddhist calendar: 1159
- Burmese calendar: −23
- Byzantine calendar: 6123–6124
- Chinese calendar: 甲戌年 (Wood Dog); 3312 or 3105 — to — 乙亥年 (Wood Pig); 3313 or 3106
- Coptic calendar: 331–332
- Discordian calendar: 1781
- Ethiopian calendar: 607–608
- Hebrew calendar: 4375–4376
- Hindu calendars
- Vikram Samvat: 671–672
- Shaka Samvat: 536–537
- Kali Yuga: 3715–3716
- Holocene calendar: 10615
- Iranian calendar: 7 BP – 6 BP
- Islamic calendar: 7 BH – 6 BH
- Japanese calendar: N/A
- Javanese calendar: 505–506
- Julian calendar: 615; DCXV
- Korean calendar: 2948
- Minguo calendar: 1297 before ROC 民前1297年
- Nanakshahi calendar: −853
- Seleucid era: 926/927 AG
- Thai solar calendar: 1157–1158
- Tibetan calendar: ཤིང་ཕོ་ཁྱི་ལོ་ (male Wood-Dog); 741 or 360 or −412 — to — ཤིང་མོ་ཕག་ལོ་ (female Wood-Boar); 742 or 361 or −411

Year 615 (DCXV) was a common year starting on Wednesday of the Julian calendar. The denomination 615 for this year has been used since the early medieval period, when the Anno Domini calendar era became the prevalent method in Europe for naming years.

== Events ==
=== By place ===
==== Europe ====
- The Balkans are freely overrun by the Slavs, who settle in large numbers in what is now Bulgaria, Serbia, North Macedonia and parts of Greece. The western territories of modern-day Yugoslavia (Bosnia, Croatia and Dalmatia) suffer raids from the Avars, who settle in this region.
- The Slavs under Chatzon attack in longboats along the coasts of Thessaly, western Anatolia, and various Greek islands. They besiege the Byzantine city of Thessaloniki in a combined land and sea attack. The Slavs with their families encamp before the city walls.
- The city of Epidaurus (Dalmatia) is destroyed by the Avars and Slavic invaders. The Illyrian refugees flee to the nearby island Laus, where they found Dubrovnik (Ragusa). The islands of Rab, Krk and Cres become major food suppliers for the surviving cities of the mainland.
- Eleutherius succeeds John I as exarch of Ravenna. He persecutes those implicated in the murder of John and the judges of the State. After making a courtesy visit to Pope Adeodatus I, Eleutherius captures Naples and kills the rebel leader John of Conza.

==== Britain ====
- Bangor Massacre: The Anglo-Saxons, under King Æthelfrith of Northumbria, after defeating the Kingdom of Powys, finally reach the Irish Sea and massacre 1,200 Christian monks at their monastery, in Bangor (Wales).
- Edwin of Northumbria takes refuge in East Anglia; he marries Cwenburga, daughter of king Cearl of Mercia (according to the Historia ecclesiastica gentis Anglorum).

==== Mesoamerica ====
- July 29 – Queen Sak Kʼukʼ is succeeded by her son Pacal the Great, as ruler of the Maya city state Palenque (Mexico). He begins a building program at his capital, that produces some of Maya civilization's finest art and architecture.

=== By topic ===
==== Religion ====
- May 25 – Pope Boniface IV dies after a 7-year reign, in which he has converted the Pantheon into the Church of "Santa Maria Rotonda". He is succeeded by Adeodatus I (also known as Deusdedit) as the 68th pope of Rome.
- Several of Muhammad's followers begin to emigrate to the Aksumite Empire. They found a small colony there, under the protection of the Christian Ethiopian emperor Așhama ibn Abjar.

== Births ==
- Æbbe, Anglo-Saxon princess and abbess (approximate date)
- Begga, Frankish abbess and saint (d. 693)
- Bertin, Frankish abbot (approximate date)
- Buyeo Yung, prince of Baekje (d. 682)
- Fatima, daughter of Muhammad (or 605)
- Leodegar, bishop of Autun (approximate date)
- Li Jingxuan, official of the Tang dynasty (d. 682)

== Deaths ==
- May 25 – Pope Boniface IV
- November 21 – Columbanus, Irish missionary (b. 543)
- Chatzon, chieftain of the Slavs
- John I Lemigius, exarch of Ravenna
- John of Conza, Italian rebel leader (or 618)
- Liu Jingyan, empress of the Chen dynasty (b. 534)
- Máel Coba mac Áedo, High King of Ireland
- Pybba, king of Mercia (approximate date)
