= List of shipwrecks in June 1827 =

The list of shipwrecks in June 1827 includes some ships sunk, wrecked or otherwise lost during June 1827.

== 1 June ==
List of shipwrecks: 1 June 1827
Ship	State	Description
Salisbury	United Kingdom	The ship was lost off Cape Mount, Africa. Her crew survived.

== 2 June ==
List of shipwrecks: 2 June 1827
Ship	State	Description
Ellen Gowan	United Kingdom	The ship was sunk off Ceuta, Spain by shore-based artillery as she was not flying her Red Ensign. Her crew survived. She was on a voyage from Cartagena, Spain to Newcastle upon Tyne, Northumberland.

== 3 June ==
List of shipwrecks: 3 June 1827
Ship	State	Description
Apperencen	Sweden	The ship was wrecked on a reef off Gothenburg. She was on a voyage from that port to London, United Kingdom.
James Mitchell	United Kingdom	The ship ran aground 35 nautical miles (65 km) off Havana, Cuba whilst on a voyage from Liverpool, Lancashire to Havana. She was boarded the next day by 22 sailors from USS John Adams (United States Navy), who were relieved on 6 June by eleven sailors from USS Hornet (United States Navy). James Mitchell was refloated on 7 June and taken in to Havana, where salvage of $35,000 was claimed by the Americans. As the ship's owners declined to pay, she was subsequently taken to Key West, Florida and beached. James Mitchell became a total wreck there.

== 4 June ==
List of shipwrecks: 4 June 1827
Ship	State	Description
Elizabeth	(United Kingdom of Great Britain and Ireland) Cape Colony	The cutter was wrecked at Cape Agulhas. Her crew were rescued by Thames ( British East India Company). She was on a voyage from Table Bay to the Kowie River.
Orion	United Kingdom	The ship foundered in the North Sea off Christiansand, Norway with the loss of all hands. She was on a voyage from Riga, Russia to Leith, Lothian.

== 5 June ==
List of shipwrecks: 5 June 1827
Ship	State	Description
Helena Christina	Netherlands	The ship was driven ashore and wrecked at Goedereede, South Holland. All on board were rescued. She was on a voyage from Batavia, Netherlands East Indies to Amsterdam, North Holland.

== 6 June ==
List of shipwrecks: 6 June 1827
Ship	State	Description
HMS Cynthia	Royal Navy	The brig was wrecked on Kendal Point, Barbados. All 32 people on board were rescued. She was on a voyage from Falmouth, Cornwall to Jamaica.

== 7 June ==
List of shipwrecks: 7 June 1827
Ship	State	Description
Frenice	Austrian Empire	The ship was wrecked near "Chesiola". She was on a voyage from Trieste to Gibraltar.

== 18 June ==
List of shipwrecks: 18 June 1827
Ship	State	Description
Alexander	United Kingdom	The ship was driven ashore and severely damaged at Chaleur Bay, Newfoundland, British North America.

== 22 June ==
List of shipwrecks: 22 June 1827
Ship	State	Description
Adeline	United States	The ship was lost whilst on a voyage from Havana, Cuba to Savannah, Georgia.
Nereid	(United Kingdom of Great Britain and Ireland) British North America	The ship was lost near St. Mary's, Nova Scotia. She was on a voyage from Demerara to Quebec City, Lower Canada.

== 25 June ==
List of shipwrecks: 25 June 1827
Ship	State	Description
Speedwell	United Kingdom	The ship capsized at St. Michael's Mount, Cornwall. She was on a voyage from Poole, Dorset to Glasgow, Renfrewshire.

== 28 June ==
List of shipwrecks: 28 June 1827
Ship	State	Description
Pomona	United Kingdom	The ship ran aground off Domesnes, Norway, where she was subsequently wrecked in early July. She was on a voyage from London to Riga, Russian Empire.

== 29 June ==
List of shipwrecks: 29 June 1827
Ship	State	Description
Killingbeck	United Kingdom	The barque was wrecked on the south coast of Barbados.

== 30 June ==
List of shipwrecks: 30 June 1827
Ship	State	Description
Berwick	United Kingdom	The ship was wrecked with the loss of fifteen lives. She was on a voyage from Bombay, India to London.
John	United Kingdom	The ship was wrecked in the Bay of Bengal with the loss of four lives. The East Indiaman Windsor, and Woodford (United Kingdom) rescued 17 survivors.

== Unknown date ==
List of shipwrecks: Unknown date in June 1827
Ship	State	Description
Félicité	France	The ship was wrecked near St. Jago de Cuba before 19 June. She was on a voyage from Bordeaux, Gironde to Veracruz, Mexico.
Neptune	United Kingdom	The ship foundered in the North Sea off the coast of Essex. Her crew were rescued.
HMS Redwing	Royal Navy	The Cruizer-class brig-sloop departed from a port in Sierra Leone and was never heard from again. Her entire crew of 121 was lost. Wreckage which washed ashore in November 1827 indicated that she had been struck by lightning.
Soehetten	Russia	The ship was wrecked in the Orkney Islands. United Kingdom.
