= John (ship) =

Several ships have been named John:

== John (1786 ship) ==
- John, of 141, or 159, or 160 tons (bm), was launched at Newnham, or Newhaven, Sussex in 1779, possibly under another name. She had two decks and two masts, and was 72 ft 0 in (21.9 m) long, with a beam of 21 ft 10 in (6.7 m). She was armed with twelve or fourteen 6-pounder guns. Missing issues of Lloyd's Register (LR) and missing pages in extant issues have resulted in John first having appeared in the volume for 1786. Between 1786 and 1798 she traded as a West Indiaman. Then she made three voyages as a slave ship in the triangular trade in enslaved people, being captured on her third as she was delivering captives to the West Indies. 1st enslaving voyage (1798–1799): Captain Nathaniel Ireland sailed from Liverpool on 1 March 1798, bound for the Bight of Biafra. John acquired captives first at the Cameroons and then at Old Calabar. She arrived at Grenada on 14 February 1799 with 240 captives. She sailed from Grenada on 28 April and arrived back at Liverpool on 30 June. She had left Liverpool with 30 crew members and she suffered 20 crew deaths on her voyage. 2nd enslaving voyage (1800–1801): Captain William Brown sailed from Liverpool on 7 June 1800. John acquired captives at Cape Coast Castle and delivered 168 slaves to Demerara on 18 March 1801. She sailed from Demerara on 10 June and arrived back at Liverpool on 19 August 1801. She had left Liverpool with 29 crew members and suffered 11 crew deaths on the voyage. 3rd enslaving voyage (1802–loss): Captain Adam Bird sailed from Liverpool on 24 December 1802. In December 1803 Lloyd's List reported that John, Bird, master, "a Guineaman", had been captured off Trinidad. In 1803, 11 British slave ships were lost, the lowest total in the period 1793-1807. Seven of the losses occurred in the Middle Passage as the ships sailed from Africa to the West Indies. War, not maritime hazards nor slave resistance, was the greatest cause of vessel losses among British slave vessels. The Register of Shipping (RS) for 1804 carried the annotation "Captured" by her name.

== John (1790 ship) ==
- John (1790 ship) was registered in Britain in 1790. She reportedly had been launched in the United States, but where and when is currently obscure. Between 1791 and 1794 she made four voyages as a slave ship. In 1795 new owners sailed her as a whaler in the British Southern Whale Fishery. She was last listed in 1797.

== John (1797 ship) ==
- John (1797 ship) was launched in the Netherlands in 1785, probably under another name. The British captured her in 1797. The new owners gave her the name John, and she became a merchantman. Between 1800 and 1804 she made three voyages as a slave ship. She then became a trader and transport again until a French privateer captured and burnt her in 1809.

== John (1797 slave ship) ==
- John (1797 slave ship) was launched in France in 1793, almost certainly under another name, and was taken in prize. She started trading as a West Indiaman, but then became a slave ship, making six complete voyages. She was lost in late 1806 on her seventh voyage. The slaves she was carrying were landed safely.

== John (1804 ship) ==
- John (1804 ship) was launched at Chepstow. She then became a West Indiaman, sailing between Bristol and Jamaica. In 1826 she started sailing to Bengal under a license from the British East India Company (EIC). She was wrecked on 30 June 1827 on such a voyage.

== John (1809 ship) ==
- John (1809 ship) was launched at Chester in 1809 as a West Indiaman. Between 1827 and 1833 she made three voyages to New South Wales and two to Van Diemen's Land transporting convicts. Thereafter she traded between the United Kingdom and North America. She was wrecked in May 1855 with heavy loss of life while carrying migrants from Plymouth to Quebec.

== Other ==
- John was commanded by Gilbert Horseley in the 1570s.
- John was the former slave ship True Briton (1775 ship). John made one voyage in the triangular trade in enslaved people between 1778 and 1779. On her return to Liverpool, John became the privateer and then slave ship Bellona.
- John (1811 ship) was launched at Deptford in 1811.
- John (1811 Quebec ship) was launched at Quebec in 1811.
