= Johann III =

Johann III may refer to:

- Johann III, Count of Sponheim-Starkenburg (c. 1315 – 1398)
- Johann III, Burgrave of Nuremberg (c. 1369 – 1420)
- Johann III, Duke of Cleves (1490–1538/9)
- Johann III Bernoulli (1744–1807)

== See also ==
- John III (disambiguation)
