= Decius (disambiguation) =

Decius was a 3rd-century Roman emperor.

Decius may also refer to:

- Decia gens for several other Ancient Romans
- Publius Decius Mus (consul 340 BC), Roman general and politician that sacrificed himself in battle during the Latin War
- Decius (consul 529), Flavius Decius (fl. 529-546), politician of the Eastern Roman Empire
- Decius (Exarch), first Exarch of Ravenna 584–585
- Decius Wadsworth (1768-1821), Colonel in the Ordnance Corps of the United States Army who, in 1817, created Wadsworth's cipher
- Filippo Decio (1454–1535), Italian jurist
- Nikolaus Decius (c.1485–1541), German minister and hymn writer
- Iodocus Ludovicus Decius (1485-1545), secretary to the Polish king Sigismund I the Old
- Tom Cross (computer security), American technology expert who works under the pseudonym Decius, from Decius Wadsworth
- Decius (band), a London-based electronic music band
- A misspelling of Decimus Junius Brutus Albinus as "Decius Brutus" in William Shakespeare's Julius Caesar
