= Column of Phocas =

Ancient Roman triumphal column, a landmark of Rome, Italy

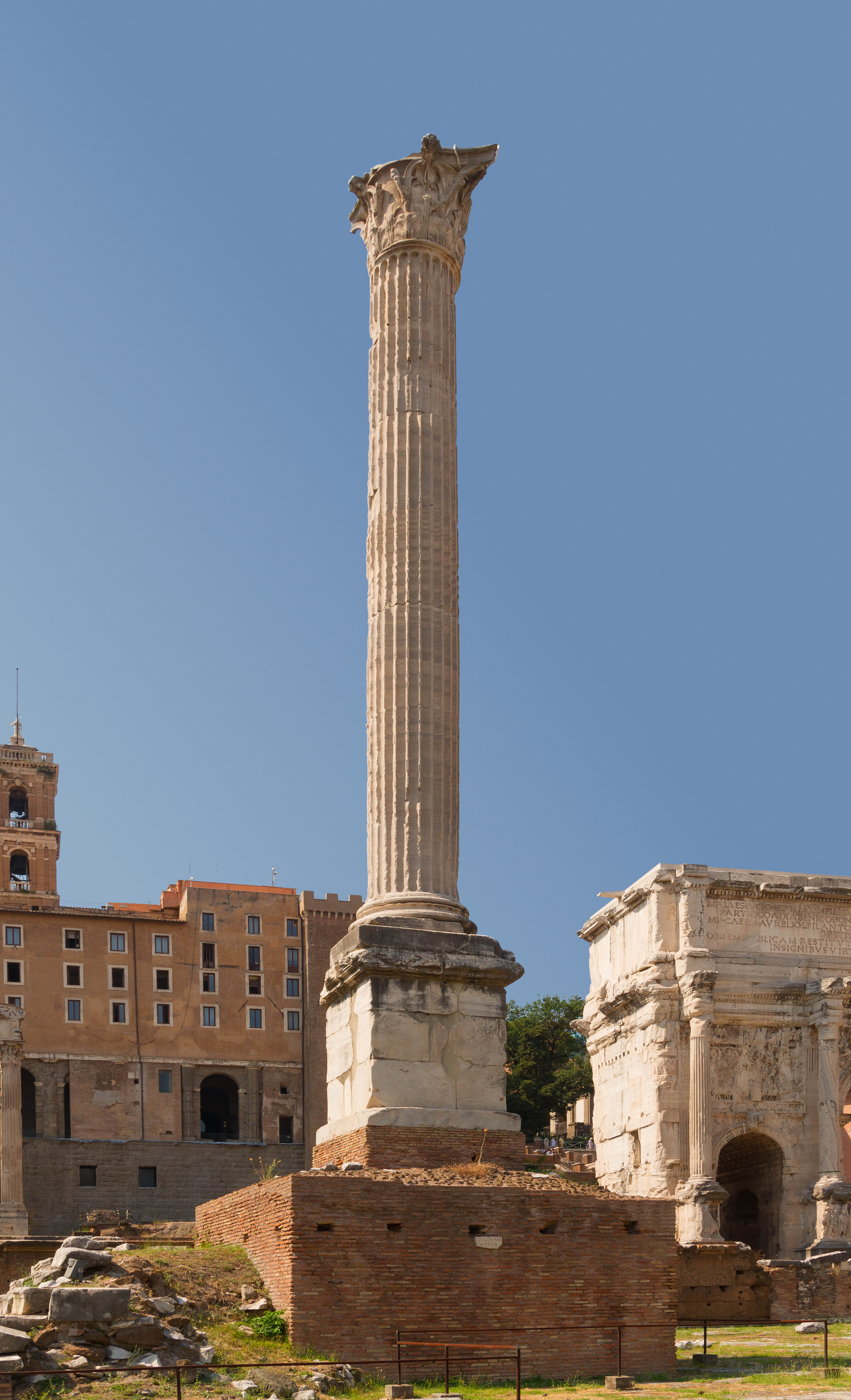
- The Column of Phocas, against the backdrop of the Arch of Septimius Severus

- Location within Rome
- Interactive map of Column of Phocas
- 41°53′33″N 12°29′05″E

The Column of Phocas (Italian: Colonna di Foca) is a Roman monumental column in the Roman Forum of Rome, Italy, built when Rome was part of the Eastern Roman Empire after its reconquest from the Kingdom of the Ostrogoths.

== History ==
Erected in front of the Rostra and dedicated or rededicated in honour of the Eastern Roman Emperor Phocas on August 1, 608 AD, it was the last architectural addition made to the Forum Romanum, after over 1,300 years of construction. The fluted Corinthian column stands 13.6 m (44 ft) tall on its cubical white marble socle. On stylistic grounds, the column seems to have been made in the 2nd century for an unknown structure, and then recycled for the present monument. Likewise, the socle was recycled from its original use supporting a statue dedicated to Diocletian; the former inscription was chiselled away to provide a space for the later text.

The base of the column was uncovered in 1813, and the inscription on it reads, in Latin:

Optimo clementiss[imo piissi]moque / principi domino n[ostro] / F[ocae imperat]ori / perpetuo a d[e]o coronato, [t]riumphatori / semper Augusto / Smaragdus ex praepos[ito] sacri palatii / ac patricius et exarchus Italiae / devotus eius clementiae / pro innumerabilibus pietatis eius beneficiis et pro quiete / procurata Ital[iae] ac conservata libertate / hanc sta(tuam maiesta)tis eius / auri splend(ore fulge)ntem huic / sublimi colu(m)na(e ad) perennem / ipsius gloriam imposuit ac dedicavit / die prima mensis Augusti, indict[ione] und[icesima] / p[ost] c[onsulatum] pietatis eius anno quinto

The English translation is as follows:

To the best, most clement and pious ruler, our lord Phocas the perpetual emperor, crowned by God, the forever august triumphator, did Smaragdus, former praepositus sacri palatii and patricius and Exarch of Italy, devoted to His Clemency for the innumerable benefactions of His Piousness and for the peace acquired for Italy and its freedom preserved, this statue of His Majesty, blinking from the splendor of gold here on this tallest column for his eternal glory erect and dedicate, on the first day of the month of August, in the eleventh indiction in the fifth year after the consulate of His Piousness.

The precise occasion for this signal honour is unknown, though Phocas had formally donated the Pantheon to Pope Boniface IV, who rededicated it to all the martyrs and Mary (Sancta Maria ad Martyres). Atop the column's capital was erected by Smaragdus, the Exarch of Ravenna, a "dazzling" gilded statue of Phocas (which probably only briefly stood there). Rather than a demonstration to mark papal gratitude as it is sometimes casually declared to be, the gilded statue on its column was more likely an emblem of the imperial sovereignty over Rome, which was rapidly fading under pressure from the Lombards, and a personal mark of gratitude from Smaragdus, who had been recalled by Phocas from a long exile and was indebted to the Emperor for retrieving his position of power at Ravenna.

In October 610, Phocas was overthrown and killed; his statues everywhere were overthrown.

The monument remains today in its original location (in situ). Its isolated, free-standing position among the ruins has always made it a landmark in the Forum, and it often appears in vedute and engravings. The rise in ground level due to silt and debris had completely buried the socle by the time Giuseppe Vasi and Giambattista Piranesi made engravings and etchings of the column in the mid-18th century. The square foundation of brick was not originally visible, the present level of the Forum not having been excavated down to its earlier Augustan paving until the 19th century.

== See also ==
- Trajan's Column – Ancient Roman victory column, a landmark of Rome, Italy
- Sigismund's Column – Monument in Warsaw, Poland

Preceded by Column of Marcus Aurelius	Landmarks of Rome; Column of Phocas	Succeeded by Trajan's Column
