= John =

John is a common English name and surname:

- John (given name)
- John (surname)

John may also refer to:

== New Testament ==
=== Works ===
- Gospel of John, a title often shortened to John
- First Epistle of John, often shortened to 1 John
- Second Epistle of John, often shortened to 2 John
- Third Epistle of John, often shortened to 3 John

=== People ===
- John the Baptist (died c. 33), regarded as a prophet and the forerunner of Jesus Christ
- John the Apostle (died c. 100), one of the twelve apostles of Jesus Christ
- John the Evangelist, assigned author of the Fourth Gospel, once identified with the Apostle
- John of Patmos, also known as John the Divine or John the Revelator, the author of the Book of Revelation, once identified with the Apostle
- John the Presbyter, a figure either identified with or distinguished from the Apostle, the Evangelist and John of Patmos

== Other people with the given name ==
=== Religious figures ===
- John, father of Andrew the Apostle and Saint Peter
- Pope John (disambiguation), several popes
- Saint John (disambiguation), many people
- John of Antioch (historian), a chronicler of the 7th century
- John (Archdeacon of Barnstaple), medieval archdeacon in England
- John (bishop of Wrocław) (died 1072), Polish Roman Catholic bishop
- John (bishop of Banyas) (died 1170), bishop in the Kingdom of Jerusalem
- John (bishop of Tripoli) (died c. 1186), Roman Catholic bishops in the Kingdom of Jerusalem
- John (Bishop of Ardfert) (died 1286), Irish bishop
- John Edward Robinson (bishop) (1849–1922), missionary bishop of the Methodist Episcopal Church, elected in 1904
- Metropolitan John (Ivan Stinka) (1935–2022), primate of the Ukrainian Orthodox Church of Canada until 2010
- John (Pelushi) (born 1956), Orthodox Archbishop of Tirana, Durrës and All Albania since 2025
- John (Roshchin) (born 1974), Metropolitan of Vienna and Budapest in the Russian Orthodox Church since 2019

=== Rulers and other political figures ===
- John (constable of Armenia) (died 1343), regent of the Armenian Kingdom of Cilicia
- John of Austria (disambiguation), several people
- John of Bohemia (1296–1346), called John the Blind, king from 1310
- John, King of Denmark, Norway, and Sweden, better known as Hans of Denmark (1455–1513)
- John of England (1166–1216), king and younger brother of Richard I
- John I of Hungary or János Szapolyai (1487–1540), king from 1526
- John (knez), 13th-century leader in Oltenia
- John (Mauro-Roman king) (died 546), king from 545
- John of Poland (disambiguation), three people
- John of Scotland also known as John de Balliol (c. 1249–1314), king from 1292 to 1296
- Infante John, Duke of Valencia de Campos (1349–1397)
- John, Lord of Reguengos de Monsaraz (1400–1442)
- Infante John of Coimbra, Prince of Antioch (1431–1457)
- Infante John, Duke of Viseu (1448–1472), 3rd Duke of Viseu, 2nd Duke of Beja, King Manuel I's older brother
- John the Scythian, a general and politician of the Eastern Roman Empire, consul in 498
- John the Hunchback, a general and politician of the Eastern Roman Empire, consul in 499
- John (nephew of the consul Vitalian), a Byzantine general under Justinian I
- John (Sicilian admiral), 12th century
- John Troglita, a 6th-century Byzantine general
- John of Gaunt, 1st Duke of Lancaster (1340–1399), third son of Edward III, King of England
- Prince John of the United Kingdom (1905–1919), prince of the United Kingdom, youngest son/child of George V

== Arts and entertainment ==
=== Fictional characters ===
- John (Tomorrow People), appearing in the children's science-fiction TV series The Tomorrow People
- John (John and Gillian), appearing in the Doctor Who TV comic strip
- John-117, or Master Chief, the protagonist of the video game franchise Halo

=== Literature ===
- John, a 1927 play by Philip Barry
- JOHN, a 2014 play by Lloyd Newson
- John (2005 book), a book by Cynthia Lennon about musician John Lennon

=== Songs ===
- "John" (Desireless song)
- "John" (Lil Wayne song)

== Other uses ==
- John (ship), several ships
- Slang for a toilet
- Slang for a person who hires a prostitute
- John Peaks, mountains on Powell Island, Antarctica
- John the Ripper, password strength checking program (the executable program is simply "john")
- List of storms named John

== See also ==
- Johns (disambiguation)
- Jon (disambiguation)
