= Yohannes =

- Pronunciation: Amharic pronunciation: [johänɨs] Tigrinya pronunciation: [johänɨs]
- Gender: Male

Origin
- Word/name: Hebrew (via Latin and Greek)
- Meaning: "The Lord is gracious"

Yohannes is a masculine given name and a surname of Amharic and Tigrinya origin. It is the equivalent of the English biblical name John. Notable people with the name include:

== Given name ==
- Yohannes I of Ethiopia (died 1682)
- Yohannes II of Ethiopia (1699–1769)
- Yohannes III of Ethiopia (1797–1873)
- Yohannes IV of Ethiopia (1837–1889)
- Yohannes Bahçecioğlu (born 1988), German-Turkish footballer
- Yohannes Gebregeorgis, founder of Ethiopia Reads
- Yohannes Gebremeskel (born 1960), Ethiopian lieutenant general
- Yohannes Gugarats, Armenian military leader in early 18th century
- Yohannes Haile-Selassie (born 1961), Ethiopian paleoanthropologist
- Yohannes Mohamed (born 1948), Ethiopian long-distance runner
- Yohannes Sahle (born 1966), Ethiopian football manager
- Yohannes Tikabo (born 1974), Eritrean singer-songwriter
- Yohannes Tilahun (born 1993), Eritrean footballer
- Yohannes Yual, major general and leader of the South Sudan Defense Forces

== Surname ==
- Ras Mengesha Yohannes, acknowledged "natural" son and designated heir of Yohannes IV
- Araya Selassie Yohannes (1870–1888), son of Yohannes IV and nominated Crown Prince
- Aster Yohannes, veteran of Eritrean People's Liberation Front and an independence activist
- Daniel Yohannes (born 1952), Ethiopian-American businessman and philanthropist
- Dawit Yohannes (1956–2019), Ethiopian politician
- Fesshaye Yohannes (1954–?), Eritrean journalist
- Lily Yohannes (born 2007), American professional soccer player of Eritrean descent
- Nebahne Yohannes, claimant to the title of king of Ethiopia in the early 18th century
- Tereza Yohannes (born 1982), Ethiopian long-distance runner
- Zekarias Yohannes (1925–2016), Eritrean Catholic bishop

== See also ==
- Ioannes (given name)
- Johannes
- John (given name)
