= Eutychius (exarch) =

Exarch of Ravenna

Eutychius (Ancient Greek: Ευτύχιος, romanized: Eutúkhios; Italian: Eutichio) was the last Exarch of Ravenna, heading the Exarchate from 726 or 727 until 751 AD. Despite some diplomatic and political success such as securing alliances, his known rule was defined largely by both domestic and foreign struggle, before ultimate failure as his domain was seized and life ended by the Lombard Kingdom.

== Arrival in Italy and first struggles ==
The Exarchate of Ravenna had risen in revolt in 726 at the imposition of iconoclasm; the Exarch Paul lost his life attempting to quash the revolt. In response, Emperor Leo III the Isaurian (r. 717–741) sent the eunuch Eutychius to take control of the situation. In certain historical works, Eutychius is mentioned as having served as exarch already in 710/11–713, between the tenures of John III Rizocopus and Scholasticus. This is however a modern interpolation based on an erroneous reading of the Liber pontificalis. Eutychius landed in Naples, where he called upon loyal citizens to assassinate Pope Gregory II. When the citizens responded by pledging to defend the Pope and to die in his defense, Eutychius turned his attention to the Lombards, offering King Liutprand and the Lombard dukes bribes if they would abandon Pope Gregory. Despite all of this, according to Jeffrey Richards, Pope Gregory persisted in his efforts to preserve imperial rule in Italy.

Eutychius's efforts eventually gained results: King Liutprand came to an agreement with the Exarch, and agreed to support him in return for assistance in subjecting the duchies of Benevento and Spoleto. Pope Gregory, however, met with Liutprand, and convinced him to abandon the effort, then with Liutprand's help effected a reconciliation with Eutychius. When one Tiberius Petasius proclaimed himself emperor in Tuscia and Eutychius found himself critically short of manpower, Pope Gregory ordered the Roman army to help him put down the rebellion, and Petasius was killed.

== Exile and appeal for help ==
Conflict with the Lombards resulted in disaster in 737, when the exarchate's capital, Ravenna, was seized by Liutprand. Further warfare erupted in 739. Pope Gregory III had supported the dukes of Benevento and Spoleto against Liutprand, causing the latter to invade central Italy. The exarchate, as well as the Duchy of Rome, was ravaged and Ravenna fell to the Lombards; Eutychius was forced to seek refuge in the Venetian islands. He appealed to the inhabitants to help liberate Ravenna, and the Venetian fleet sailed with him to recover the city.

== Papal intervention in Ravenna ==
Shortly after the accession of Pope Zachary in 741, Liutprand planned to campaign against the Lombard Duchy of Spoleto, which had defied him. Zachary, however, marched north to the Lombard capital of Pavia and convinced Liutprand to abort the expedition and to restore some of the territory he had captured. Nevertheless, Liutprand saw this treaty as between him and the Pope alone; in the words of Jeffrey Richards, "he still regarded the exarch as fair game."

In 743, Liutprand marched on Ravenna, and Eutychius was so impoverished in resources that he, Archbishop John V of Ravenna, and the leading citizens petitioned the pope to intervene. Pope Zachary began a diplomatic offensive to dissuade Liutprand from conquering Ravenna, and on his journey to the Lombard court at Ticinum, he was met at the church of St. Christopher at Aquila by Exarch Eutychius and citizens of Ravenna. "The sight of the exarch begging the pope to save him from the Lombards testifies more powerfully than anything else to the utter enfeeblement of the exarchate and the effective transfer of authority in Catholic Byzantine Italy from the imperial governor to the pope," observes Richards. Pope Zachary was successful in convincing Liutprand to put off his intended campaign and return the rural districts around Ravenna he had seized.

== Fall of the Exarchate ==
Several years later, however, in 751, the Lombard king Aistulf captured Ravenna and it seems Eutychius faced the Lombards with what little resources he had, but was eventually seized & executed on the orders of Aistulf. The Exarchate came to an end, and Byzantine Italy was confined to Sicily and the southern, Greek-speaking regions.

== Sources ==
- Richards, Jeffrey (1979). The Popes and the Papacy in the Early Middle Ages, 476–752. London and Boston: Routledge & Kegan Paul. ISBN 0-7100-0098-7.
- Hollingsworth, Paul A. (1991). "Eutychios". In Kazhdan, Alexander (ed.). The Oxford Dictionary of Byzantium. Oxford and New York: Oxford University Press. pp. 759–760. ISBN 0-19-504652-8.
- Brown, Thomas S. (1993). "Eutichio". Dizionario Biografico degli Italiani, Volume 43 (in Italian). Treccani.it - L'enciclopedia italiana.

| Preceded by Paul | Exarch of Ravenna; 728–752 | Exarchate conquered by the Lombards |
