= Theodore II =

Theodore II can refer to:

- Theodore II, Exarch of Ravenna in 677–687
- Patriarch Theodore II of Alexandria (Coadjutor), Greek Patriarch of Alexandria between the 7th and 8th centuries
- Pope Theodore II who reigned for twenty days during December 897
- Theodore II of Constantinople, Ecumenical Patriarch in 1214–1216
- Theodore II Laskaris, emperor of Nicaea (Byzantine Emperor in exile), 1254–1258
- Theodore II Palaiologos (c.1396–1448), Despot of the Morea from 1407 to 1443
- Theodore II, Marquess of Montferrat (died 1418), also of the Palaiologos dynasty
- Tewodros II of Ethiopia, Theodore II, Emperor of Ethiopia, 1855–1868
- Patriarch Theodore II of Alexandria (born 1954), current (since 2004) Eastern Orthodox Patriarch of Alexandria
- Pope Tawadros II of Alexandria, Pope of the Coptic Orthodox Church of Alexandria (since 2012)

== See also ==
- Feodor II of Russia
