= Johann I =

Johann I may refer to:

- Johann I Josef, Prince of Liechtenstein (1760–1836)
- Johann I, Duke of Opava-Ratibor
- Johann I, Count Palatine of Simmern
- Johann I, Count Palatine of Zweibrücken
- John, Elector of Saxony (1468–1532), John the Steadfast
- Johann, Count of Cleves
- Johann, Count of Coronini-Cronberg
- Johann, Count of Pálffy
- Johann, Count von Aldringer
- Johann, Count von Werth
- Johann, Elector of Brandenburg
- Johann Strauss I
- Johann, Baron von Appel
- Johann I, Count of Habsburg-Laufenburg-Rapperswil (* around 1295/97, † 1337)
- Johann Adolf I, Duke of Saxe-Weissenfels

== See also ==
- John I (disambiguation)
