= Johann IV =

Johann IV may refer to:

- Johann IV, Duke of Bavaria (1437–1463)
- Johann IV von Isenburg (died 1556)
- Johann IV, Count of Katzenelnbogen (died 1444)
- Johann IV von Schweidnitz (1375–1451), bishop of Meissen
- Johann IV Ludwig von Hagen (1492–1547)
- Johann IV Roth (died 1506), bishop of Wrocław
- Yohannes IV of Ethiopia (1837–1889)

== See also ==
- John IV (disambiguation)
