= Romanus (exarch) =

Romanus (Ancient Greek: Ρωμανός, romanized: Rōmanós; died 596 or 597) was Exarch of Ravenna from 589 until 596 or 597.

Prior to being appointed Exarch, Romanus won a victory against the future Sassanid ruler Bahram Chobin in 589 at the battle of the Araxes, provoking his revolt and usurpation of Hormizd IV.

In 589 he became Exarch in place of the discredited Smaragdus. In his first year Romanus recovered the cities of Modena, Reggio, Parma, Piacenza, Altinum, and Mantua from the Lombards.

In 592 Pope Gregory I appealed to the Exarch for help in assisting Naples, then under Lombard attack, but Romanus thought it more prudent to remain in central Italy. The Pope was forced to make peace with the Duchy of Spoleto to save Naples. Shortly afterwards, the Lombards occupied Perugia, causing Romanus to send an army to retake Umbria. The Lombard King Agilulf, noticing this, crossed into central Italy and even threatened Rome. Frustrated with the lack of support he received from the Exarch (R.A. Markus describes him as a "large thorn in Gregory's side"), the Pope tried to circumvent Romanus' authority by appealing to the Byzantine Emperor Maurice in 595, but this proved fruitless, given the fact that Maurice saw more value in maintaining a link between Ravenna and the Balkans, where he kept the Avars and Slavs at bay.

Romanus died soon after this, and was succeeded by Callinicus, who proved to be more conciliatory to Pope Gregory.

Preceded by Smaragdus	Exarch of Ravenna; 589–598	Succeeded by Callinicus
