= Ioannes VIII =

Ioannes VIII (Ancient Greek: Ἰωάννης Η', Iōannēs Ē') may refer to:

- Patriarch John VIII of Constantinople (r. 1064–1065)
- John VIII Palaiologos, Byzantine Emperor (1392–1448)

== See also ==
- John VIII (disambiguation)
