= Jean I =

Jean I may refer to:

- Jean I of Arles (died 675), Archbishop of Arles
- John I of Ponthieu (c. 1140–1191), son of Guy II of Ponthieu
- Jean I de Montfort (died 1249), Comte de Montfort
- John I of Brittany (1217–1286), John the Red, Duke of Brittany
- John I of Hainaut (1218–1257), Count of Hainaut
- John I, Count of Auxerre (1243–1309), son of John, Count of Chalon, ruled jointly as Count of Auxerre
- John I of Brabant (c. 1252–1294), Duke of Brabant, Lothier and Limburg
- Jean I de Grailly (died c. 1301), seneschal of Duchy of Gascony and Kingdom of Jerusalem
- Jean I Le Maingre (c. 1310–1367)
- John I of France (born/died 1316), King of France and Navarre, and Count of Champagne for his five days alive
- John I of Armagnac (died 1373), Count of Armagnac
- Jean I de Croÿ (c. 1365–1415), founder of the House of Croÿ
- John I, Duke of Bourbon (1381–1434), Duke of Bourbonand Duke of Auvergne
- Jean I of Monaco (c. 1382 – 1454)
- Jean I of Albret (1425–1468)
- Jean Bérain the Elder (1640–1711), French draughtsman, designer, painter and engraver
- Jean Restout the Elder (1666–1702), French painter, part of Restout family of painters
- Jean, Grand Duke of Luxembourg (1921–2019), ruled Luxembourg from 1964 to 2000

== See also ==
- John I (disambiguation)
- Juan I (disambiguation)
