= Juan I =

Juan I is the name of:

- Juan I of Portugal (1358–1433)
- Juan I of Castile (1358–1390)
- Juan I of Aragon (1350–1396)

== See also ==
- John I (disambiguation)
- Jean I (disambiguation)
