= John of Poland =

John of Poland may refer to:

- John I Albert of Poland (1459–1501)
- John II Casimir Vasa (1609–1672)
- Jan III Sobieski (1629–1696)

== See also ==
- John I (disambiguation)
- John II (disambiguation)
- John III (disambiguation)
