= Duchy of Perugia =

Italian duchy (554 – ca. 752)

Duchy of Perugia Ducatus Perusianus
- Duchy of the Byzantine Empire
- 554 – ca. 752
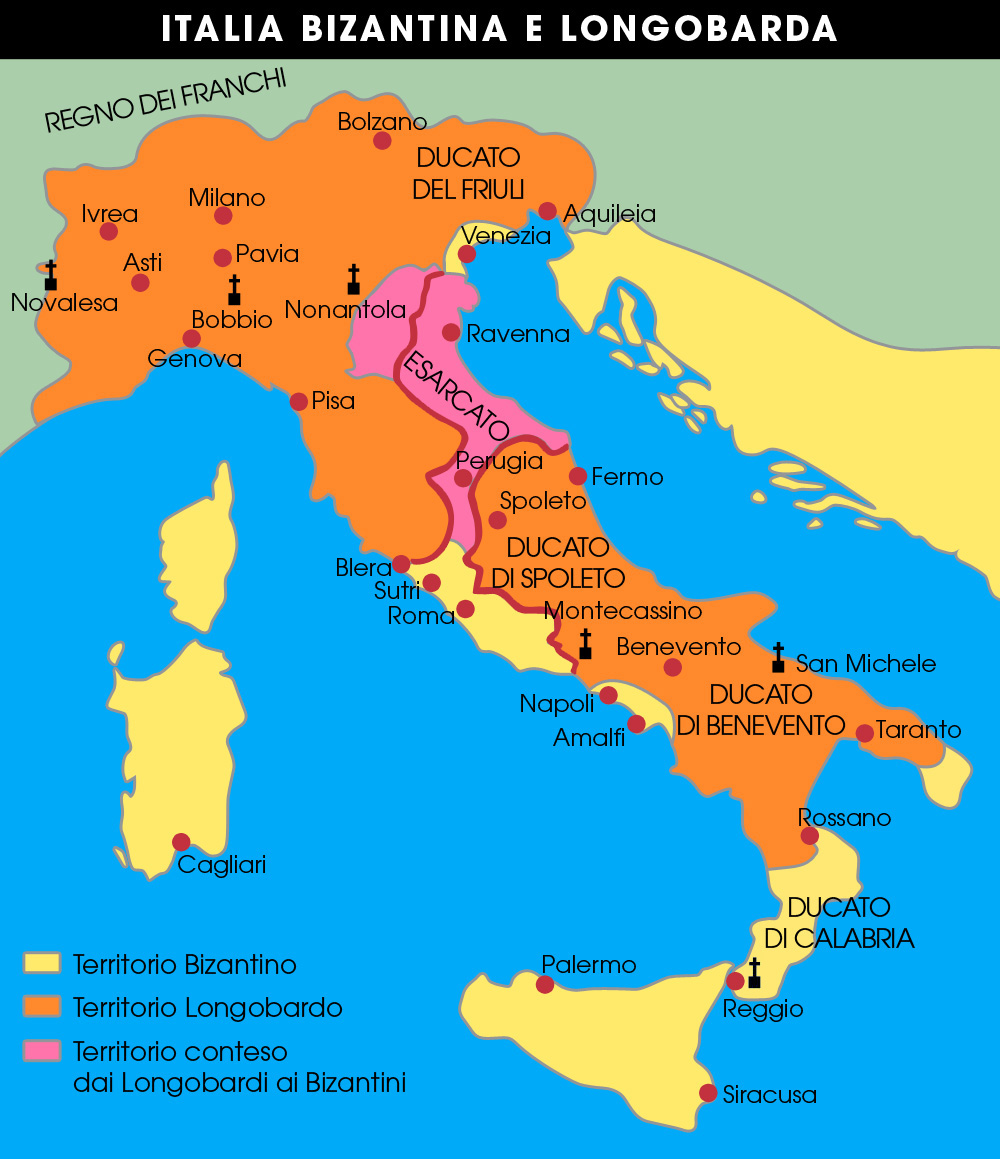
- Map of the Exarchate and the Lombard territories around the mid-7th century.
- Capital: Perugia
- Historical era: Middle Ages
  - Establishment under the authority of the Praetorian Prefect of Italy: 554
  - Part of the Exarchate of Ravenna: 584
  - De facto control by the Papacy: ca. 752
- Today part of: Italy

The Duchy of Perugia was a duchy (Latin: ducatus) in the Italian part of the Byzantine Empire. Its civil and military administration was overseen by a duke (dux) appointed by and under the authority originally of the Praetorian Prefect of Italy (554–584) and later of the Exarch of Ravenna (584–751). Its chief city and namesake was Perugia (Perusia), located at its centre. It was a band of territory connecting the Duchy of the Pentapolis to its northeast with the Duchy of Rome to its southwest, and separating the duchies of Tuscia (to its northwest) and Spoleto (to its southeast), both parts of the Lombard Kingdom of Italy. It was of great strategic significance to the Byzantines since it provided communication between Rome, the city of the Popes, and Ravenna, the capital of the Exarchate. Since it cut off the Duke of Spoleto from his nominal overlord, the king ruling from Pavia, it also disturbed the Lombard kingdom, which was a constant thorn in the Byzantines' side. This strategic importance meant that many Lombard and Byzantine armies passed through it.

Thomas Noble, an American historian, has surmised that by 739–740, when Pope Gregory III was negotiating with Charles Martel, Duke of the Franks, for assistance against the Lombards, the Pope already envisaged an independent republic of his "peculiar people" (peculiarem populum), meaning the inhabitants of the duchies of Perugia and Rome who, so remote from either Ravenna or the Byzantine capital, Constantinople, depended upon the Pope for defence and for their foreign relations. Hildeprand, the heir to the throne, and Peredeo, Duke of Vicenza, united to take Ravenna, probably in 737–740. According to the contemporary Lombard historian Paul the Deacon, this occurred before "the Romans, swollen with their accustomed pride, assembled on every side under the leadership of Agatho, duke of the Perugians, and came to seize Bononia (Bologna), where Walcari, Peredeo, and Rotcari were then staying in camp, but the latter rushed upon the Romans, made a great slaughter of them and compelled those who were left to seek flight." According to modern historians Georg Waitz, Jan Hallenbeck, and Paolo Delogu, this took place before the ephemeral conquest of Ravenna. The most common interpretation is that Agatho was trying to regain Bologna, which was a part of his duchy until it was conquered by Liutprand around 727–730, and in so doing broke a truce between the Byzantines and Lombards, thus provoking an assault on Ravenna.

In 749, the Lombard king Ratchis invaded the duchies of Perugia and Pentapolis, besieging the capital city of the former. Pope Zachary met the king at Perugia and convinced him to lift the siege and abdicate to a monastery. It has been suggested that Ratchis was forced to attack Byzantine Italy by a part of Lombard nationalists, or conversely that he attacked because Zachary had broken the terms of his predecessor's Peace of Terni, a twenty-year truce. In any case, "all Italy was quiet" between Ratchis's accession in 745 and his attack on Perugia in 749, according to Zachary's biographer in the Liber pontificalis.

With the collapse of the exarchate and the capture of Ravenna by the Lombards in 751, the Duchy of Perugia was left under de facto papal authority by 752. In a passage of the Ludovicianum that can date no earlier than 774, the cities of the Roman duchy are listed from north to south, with the cities of the Duchy of Perugia added to those of Roman Tuscany, indicating that by the time of conquest of the Lombard kingdom by the Franks, Perugia had been incorporated into the papally-ruled Duchy of Rome. In fact, the Duchy of Perugia as a distinct political unit cannot be attested later than the 740s.

== Sources ==
- Paul the Deacon (1974) [1907]. The History of the Langobards (PDF). Translated by William Dudley Foulke. Philadelphia, Pennsylvania: University of Pennsylvania.
- Noble, Thomas F. X. (1984). The Republic of St. Peter: The Birth of the Papal State, 680–825. Philadelphia, Pennsylvania: University of Pennsylvania Press. ISBN 0-8122-1239-8.
