= Gregory II (exarch) =

Gregory II (Latin: Gregorius; Ancient Greek: Γρηγόριος, romanized: Grēgórios) was an Exarch of Ravenna attested to c. 666.

His attested administration closely coincides with the Archbishop of Ravenna struggles with the papacy over the independence of the see and the Byzantine emperor Constans II's invasion of southern Italy in an unsuccessful attempt to destroy the power of the Lombards.

Preceded by Theodore I Calliopas	Exarch of Ravenna c. 666	Succeeded by Theodore II
