= Ioannes V =

Ioannes V (Ancient Greek: Ἰωάννης Ε', Iōannēs E') may refer to:

- Patriarch John V of Constantinople (ruled 669–675)
- John V Palaiologos (1332–1391)

== See also ==
- John V (disambiguation)
