= Isola Rizza dish =

Sixth-century silver dish

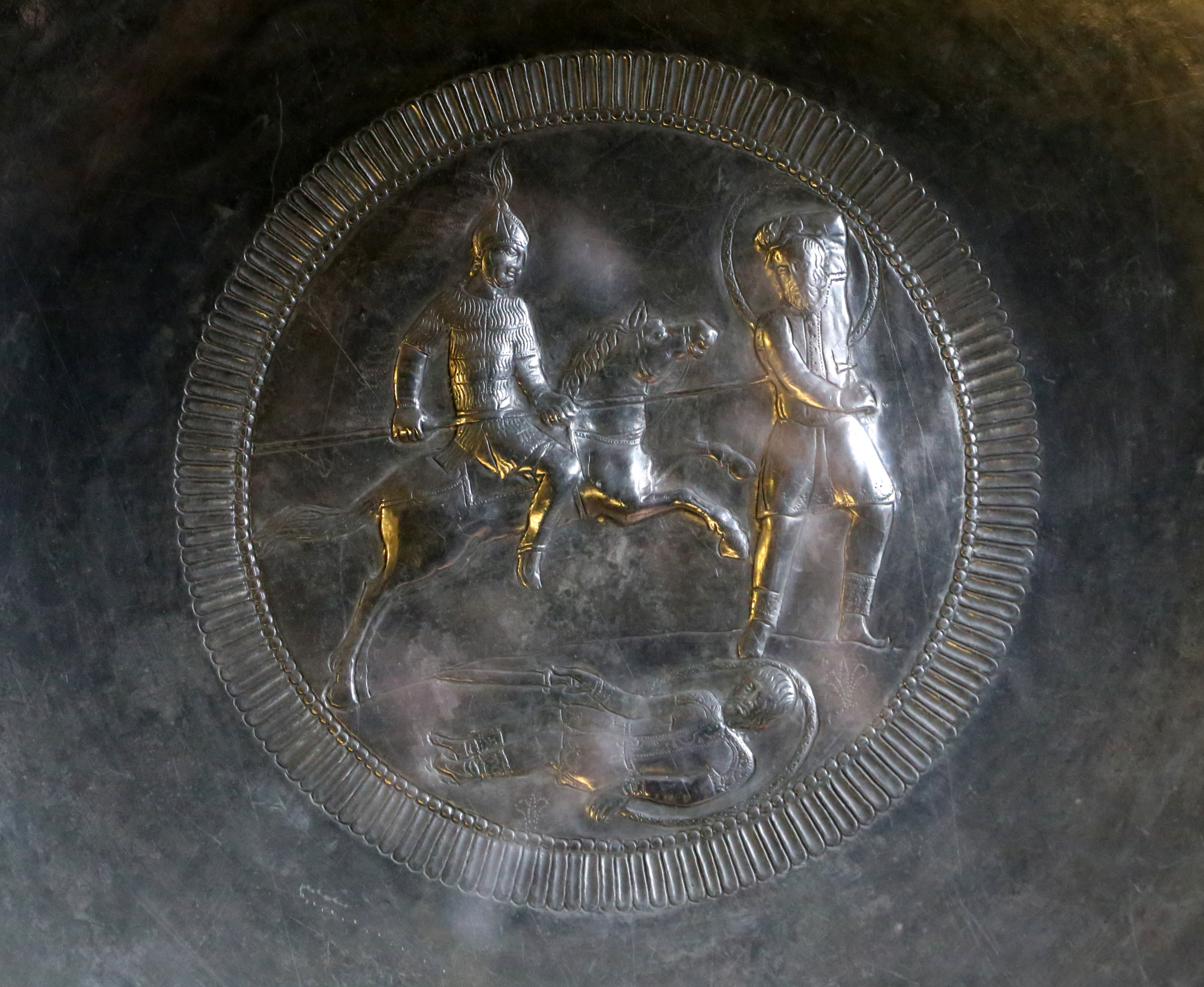
The relief medallion of the original

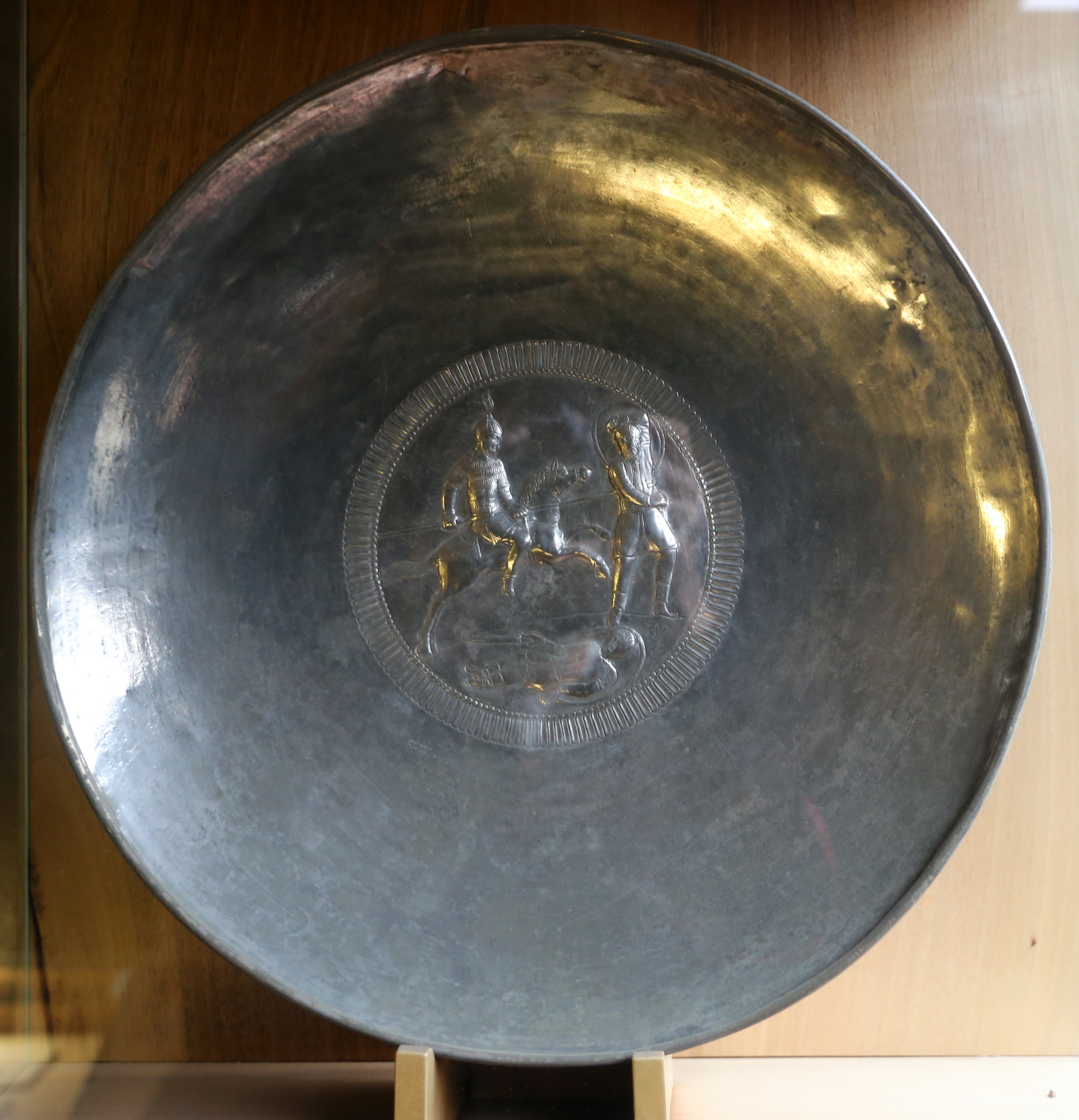
The whole dish

The Isola Rizza dish is a sixth-century silver dish with a relief medallion in the centre depicting a scene of warfare. It was part of a hoard discovered by a local in a field near the parish church in Isola Rizza in the winter of 1873. Besides the dish, the hoard contained six silver spoons, two silver and gold disc fibulae with filigree, a belt clasp and three golden belt fittings. The clasp and one fitting are now lost, but the dish is kept in the Castelvecchio Museum. Numerous copies have been made.

The dish is generally dated to the late sixth century. Stylistically, it is a Byzantine work, possibly produced in Italy. It depicts a scene from either the Gothic Wars or the Lombard Wars in Italy. The burial of the hoard may be associated with the Lombard capture of Verona in 569.

The relief medallion of the dish shows a heavy cavalryman charging one infantryman while leaping over a fallen one. The cavalryman wears a Spangenhelm-style helmet and lamellar armour, and is wielding a contus (long spear). He is most likely a Germanic or Alan mercenary in Byzantine service, possibly a cataphract. The two infantryman carry round shields and spathae (swords). They have beards, trousers and tunics. They have generally been seen as Lombards, although that implies a later dating for the hoard than 569.
