= Theophylact (exarch) =

Theophylact (Latin: Theofilactus or Theophylactus; Ancient Greek: Θεοφύλακτος, romanized: Theophúlaktos) was Exarch of Ravenna from 701 or 702 to 709, succeeding John II Platinus.

According to T.S. Brown, the garrison of Ravenna made an attempt on his life in 701. Shortly after his promotion, Theophylact marched from Sicily to Rome, where John VI had recently been made Pope. His reasons for marching into the city are not known, but his presence infuriated the Romans. The local soldiers threatened Theophylactus, but John managed to subdue them; several of the exarch's minions, however, were set upon.

In 709 the Byzantine emperor Justinian II sent an expedition under the command of the patrician Theodore against the city of Ravenna, possibly in retaliation for the participation of the city's inhabitants in the rebellion of 695. Theodore, upon reaching Ravenna, invited all of the leading citizens of the city to attend a banquet. As they arrived, they were seized and dragged aboard ship. Ravenna was then sacked, while the captured officials were brought to Constantinople. There, Justinian sentenced them all to death; the Archbishop Felix alone was spared, although he was blinded. Theophylact was apparently not a victim of the catastrophe, but had little control over the situation, and the exarchate was severely weakened.

Theophylactus was succeeded by John III Rizocopus in 709.

Preceded by John II Platyn	Exarch of Ravenna; 702–710	Succeeded by John III Rizocopus
