= John I =

John I may refer to:

== People ==
=== Religious figures ===
- John I (bishop of Jerusalem)
- John Chrysostom (349 – c. 407), Patriarch of Constantinople
- John I of Antioch (died 441)
- Pope John I of Alexandria, Coptic Pope from 496 to 505
- Pope John I, Pope from 523 to 526
- John I (exarch) (died 615), Exarch of Ravenna
- John I (archbishop of Trier) (c. 1140-1212), Archbishop of Trier from 1190 to 1212
- Pope John Paul I, Pope in 1978

=== Counts ===
- John I of Ponthieu (c. 1147 – 1191)
- John I of Dreux (1215–1249)
- John I of Avesnes (1218–1257), Count of Hainaut
- John I, Count of Blois (died 1280)
- John I of Brienne, Count of Eu (died 1294)
- John I, Count of Holland (1284–1299)
- John I Orsini (1303/4–1317), Count of Cephalonia
- John I of Nassau-Weilburg (1309–1371)
- John I, Count of La Marche (1344–1393)
- John Günther I, Count of Schwarzburg-Sondershausen, (1532–1586)
- John I, Count Palatine of Zweibrücken (1550–1604)

=== Dukes ===
- John I of Naples (died c. 719)
- John I of Amalfi (died 1007)
- John of Brunswick, Duke of Lüneburg (c. 1242–1277)
- John I, Duke of Saxony (1249–1285)
- John I, Duke of Brittany (1217–1286)
- John I, Duke of Brabant (1253–1294)
- John I, Duke of Bavaria (1329–1340)
- John I, Duke of Opava-Ratibor (c. 1322 – c. 1380–1382)
- John I, Duke of Mecklenburg-Stargard (1326–1392/93)
- John I, Duke of Lorraine (1346–1390)
- John, Duke of Berry (1340–1416)
- John the Fearless (1371-1419), ruler of the Burgundian State from 1404 to 1419
- John I of Münsterberg (ca. 1380 – 1428)
- John I, Duke of Bourbon (1381–1434)
- John Albert I, Duke of Mecklenburg, (1525–1576)
- John, 6th Duke of Braganza (1543–1583), a.k.a. John I, Duke of Braganza
- John Ernest I, Duke of Saxe-Weimar (1594–1626)
- Johann Adolf I, Duke of Saxe-Weissenfels (1649–1697)

=== Emperors ===
- John I Tzimiskes (c. 925 – 976), Byzantine Emperor
- John I of Trebizond (died 1238)
- Yohannes I of Ethiopia (ruled 1667–1692)

=== Kings ===
- John of Abkhazia (ruled 878/879–880)
- John of England (1166–1216), King of England, Lord of Ireland, Duke of Normandy and Aquitaine and Count of Anjou
- John I of Sweden (c. 1201 – 1222), king of Sweden
- John of Brienne (c. 1148 – 1237), king of Jerusalem
- John I of Cyprus (1259–1285)
- John of Scotland (c. 1249 – c. 1313)
- John I of France (1316), king for the five days he lived
- John I of Bohemia (1296–1346)
- John I of Castile (1358–1390)
- John I of Aragon (1350–1396)
- John I of Portugal (1357–1433), King of Portugal and of the Algarve, Lord of Ceuta
- John I Albert of Poland, (1459–1501)
- João I of Kongo, ruler of the Kingdom of Kongo between 1470 and 1509
- Hans, King of Denmark (1455–1513), King of Denmark, Norway and Sweden
- János Szapolyai (1487–1540), King of Hungary and Slavonia
- John of Saxony (1801–1873)

=== Princes ===
- John I, Prince of Anhalt-Bernburg (d. 1291)
- Hans-Adam I, Prince of Liechtenstein (1662–1712)

=== Others ===
- John I of Gaeta (died c. 933)
- John I Doukas of Thessaly (1268–1289)
- John I of Montferrat (c. 1275–1305), Marquis of Montferrat
- John of Islay, Lord of the Isles (died 1386)
- John I of Alençon (1385–1415)
- John Frederick I, Elector of Saxony (1503–1554)

== Biblical ==
- John 1, the first chapter of the Gospel of John
- First Epistle of John or 1 John

== See also ==
- Jean I (disambiguation)
- Juan I (disambiguation)
- Johann I (disambiguation)
- John (disambiguation)
- King John (disambiguation)
