= John of Conza =

Byzantine soldier

John of Conza or Compsa (Latin: Iohannes Consinus / Compsinus, fl. ca. 615/618), was a native of Compsa (modern Conza della Campania). Taking advantage of the turmoil in the Exarchate of Ravenna and the preoccupation of the Byzantine emperor Heraclius with the Persian war in the East, he attacked and captured Naples, becoming its second duke. His rebellion was put down by the exarch of Ravenna, Eleutherius. Consinus and many of his followers were killed in the process.

== Sources ==
- Kaegi, Walter Emil (2003). Heraclius: emperor of Byzantium. Cambridge University Press. p. 93. ISBN 978-0-521-81459-1.
- Martindale, John R., ed. (1992). The Prosopography of the Later Roman Empire: Volume III, AD 527–641. Cambridge: Cambridge University Press. pp. 702–703. ISBN 0-521-20160-8.

Preceded by Guduin	Duke of Naples c. 616	Succeeded by Anatolius
