= John II Platyn =

7th-century Exarch of Ravenna

John Platyn or Platinus (Latin: Iohannes Platinus; Ancient Greek: Ιωάννης ο Πλατύς, romanized: Iōánnēs o Platús) was Exarch of Ravenna from 687 to either 701 or 702.

John replaced Theodore II as exarch in 687. That same year, he took an active role in a disputed papal election. Bribed by the archdeacon Paschal, he demanded that the latter should be made pope. Conflict with another papal candidate, Theodore, seemed inevitable, but then a compromise candidate, Sergius I, was made pope. Paschal did not give up hope, however: he promised John a hundred pounds of gold in exchange for the papacy. John quickly came to Rome, but found that it would be too difficult to go against the majority. He therefore recognized Sergius, but demanded from the pope the hundred pounds of gold that Paschal had promised. Sergius protested, saying he had made no such agreement; when John did not give up his demands, he took the holy vessels of St. Peter's Basilica, claiming they were all he possessed. The local populace, becoming increasingly angry at the exarch, rallied to the pope and paid the sum demanded.

In 691 the Byzantine emperor Justinian II sent Pope Sergius a series of canons approved by the Quinisext Council for his signature. Jeffrey Richards notes that Justinian had believed this would be a matter of routine, since his apocrisiarius had signed them. Since several of them were counter to the interests of the papacy, Sergius refused, and forbade them to be read out publicly. Negotiations over the canons failed to solve anything, so Justinian retaliated by sending a certain Zacharias to arrest him, as his predecessors Justinian I and Constans II had done with earlier popes. The result was disastrous for the exarchate. The imperial armies in Ravenna and Rome not only refused to cooperate, the army of Ravenna marched to Rome to defend Sergius, and were joined by soldiers of the Pentapolis. The soldiers reached Rome, surrounded the papal residence, and demanded to see the pope. Zacharias is said to have cowered under the pope's bed until Sergius himself allowed him to escape; in any case, the Pope was safe. The entire affair was an embarrassment to Byzantine authority in Italy, and undermined John's power.

John was followed as exarch by Theophylactus around 702.

Preceded by Theodore II	Exarch of Ravenna; 687–702	Succeeded by Theophylactus
