= Ioannes I =

Ioannes I (Greek: Ἰωάννης A΄, "John I") may refer to:

- Patriarch John I of Constantinople (c. 347–407)
- John I Tzimiskes (c. 925–976), Byzantine Emperor
- John I Doukas of Thessaly (c. 1240–1289)

== See also ==
- John I (disambiguation)
- Ioannes II (disambiguation)
