= Ioannes VII =

Ioannes VII (Ancient Greek: Ἰωάννης Ζ', Iōannēs Ζ') may refer to:

- Patriarch John VII of Constantinople (mid-9th century)
- Emperor John VII Palaiologos (1370–1408)

== See also ==
- John VII (disambiguation)
