= John of Sweden =

John of Sweden (Swedish: Johan, Jon and Hans) may refer to:

- John, Swedish prince (died 1152), son of King Sverker I of Sweden
- John I of Sweden, King of Sweden from 1216–1222
- John, King of Denmark (John II), King of Sweden from 1497–1501
- John of Denmark (1518–1532), prince and heir apparent, son of King Christian II
- John III of Sweden, King of Sweden from 1569–1592
- John, Duke of Östergötland (1589–1618), Swedish prince
- John Casimir, Count Palatine of Kleeburg (1589–1652), Swedish prince
- John II Casimir Vasa, claimant to the throne of Sweden from 1648 to 1660
