= Paul (exarch) =

Senior Byzantine official

Paul (Latin: Paulus; Ancient Greek: Παῦλος, romanized: Paulos; before 717/18 – 726/27) was a senior Byzantine official under Leo III the Isaurian, serving as the strategos of Sicily, and then as the Exarch of Ravenna from 723 until his death.

== Life ==
Paul is first mentioned in 717/18. Theophanes the Confessor calls him the private chartoularios of Emperor Leo III the Isaurian, while Patriarch Nikephoros I of Constantinople calls him a loyal and close confidant (oikeios) of Leo's, and that he was experienced in military matters. As a result, when the governor (strategos) of Sicily, Sergios, driven by a false message that Constantinople had fallen to the Arabs, declared a rival emperor in the person of Basil Onomagoulos, Leo named him as Sergios' replacement and sent him to Sicily to restore control. It was probably on this occasion that he was raised to the rank of patrikios, although Patriarch Nikephoros implies that he already held the title.

He is commonly held to have been the same as the Paul appointed as Exarch of Ravenna in c. 723, and consequently to have held the office of strategos of Sicily continuously until then. Although both suppositions are likely, neither is certain. If the identification is true, then Paul was responsible for the defeat of an Arab attack on the island in 720/21.

As exarch, he had to face the resistance of the local inhabitants, led by Pope Gregory II, to the high taxation demanded by Leo. According to the Liber Pontificalis, the Emperor ordered Paul to either kill or imprison the Pope, but both failed and led to a renewed wave of rebellion against imperial authority in Italy; the Pope even anathematized Paul. In 726/27, the Ravenna itself rose in revolt, denouncing both Exarch Paul and Emperor Leo III, and overthrew those officers who remained loyal. Paul rallied the loyalist forces and attempted to restore order, but was killed. The armies discussed electing their own emperor and marching on Constantinople, but when they sought the advice of the Pope, he dissuaded them from acting against the sitting emperor.

According to Roberto Cessi, the person that John the Deacon's chronicle gave as the first doge of Venice, Paolo Lucio Anafesto, was actually the Exarch Paul. It is thought that this doge was a fictive invention extracted from a source John used to make this claim. Paul's magister militum, Marcellus Tegallianus was given as the second doge and this is thought to be part of the same fictive elaboration. More recent historians think that this Paul was a Lombard duke, probably the duke of Treviso.

== Sources ==
- Lilie, Ralph-Johannes; Ludwig, Claudia; Pratsch, Thomas; Zielke, Beate (2013). Prosopographie der mittelbyzantinischen Zeit Online. Berlin-Brandenburgische Akademie der Wissenschaften. Nach Vorarbeiten F. Winkelmanns erstellt (in German). Berlin and Boston: De Gruyter.
- Norwich, John Julius (1982). A History of Venice. New York: Alfred A. Knopf. ISBN 0-394-52410-1.
- Prigent, Vivien; Nichanian, Mikaël (2003). "Les stratèges de Sicile. De la naissance du thème au règne de Léon V". Revue des études byzantines (in French). 61: 97–141. doi:10.3406/rebyz.2003.2273.
- Richards, Jeffrey (1979). The Popes and the Papacy in the Early Middle Ages, 476–752. London and Boston: Routledge & Kegan Paul. ISBN 0-7100-0098-7.

Preceded by Sergios	Strategos of Sicily; 718–723	Unknown Title next held by Sergios
Preceded by Scholasticus	Exarch of Ravenna; 723–727	Succeeded by Eutychius
