= Scholasticus =

Scholasticus was Exarch of Ravenna from 713 to 723.

In 713 he was appointed as exarch, the same year Anastasius II became Byzantine emperor and overthrew his Monothelite predecessor Philippicus. Scholasticus was charged with giving a letter to Pope Constantine, which described Anastasius' allegiance to orthodoxy, helping to heal the rift between Rome and Constantinople. Around 723, he was replaced as exarch by Paul.

Vacant Title last held by John III Rizocopus	Exarch of Ravenna; 713–723	Succeeded by Paul
