= Ioannes III =

Ioannes III (Ancient Greek: Ἰωάννης Γ΄, Iōannēs G΄) may refer to:

- Patriarch John III of Constantinople (died in 577)
- John III Doukas Vatatzes (c. 1192–1254), Byzantine Emperor
- John III Megas Komnenos (c. 1321–1362), Emperor of Trebizond

== See also ==
- John III (disambiguation)
