= Decius (exarch) =

Decius (Latin: Decius, Ancient Greek: Δέκιος, romanized: Dékios) was Exarch of Ravenna from October 584 to 585. He is thought to have been the first exarch of Ravenna, although some believe that Baduarius had been exarch before him.

New title	Exarch of Ravenna; 584–585	Succeeded by Smaragdus
