= John of Austria (disambiguation) =

John of Austria may refer to:

== People ==
- John of Austria (1547–1578), Spanish military leader, illegitimate son of Charles V, Holy Roman Emperor
- John Joseph of Austria (1629–1679), Spanish general and political figure, illegitimate son of Philip IV of Spain
- Archduke John of Austria (1782–1859), thirteenth child of Leopold II, Holy Roman Emperor
- Vimaladharmasuriya I of Kandy (reigned 1592–1604), baptized by the Portuguese as Don João da Austria

== Other ==
- Don John of Austria (opera), by Isaac Nathan (1791–1864)
- John of Austria (Messina), a monument in Messina, Sicily
