= John IX =

John IX may refer to:

- Pope John IX (died 900)
- John IX bar Shushan (died 1073), Syriac Orthodox Patriarch of Antioch
- John IX of Constantinople, Patriarch of Constantinople, 1111–1134
- John IX of Haugwitz, 1524–1595
- John IX, Count of Oldenburg, 1272–c. 1301
- John IX of Salm-Kyrburg-Mörchingen, 1575–1623
- Pope John IX of Alexandria

== See also ==
- Johann IX Philipp von Walderdorff
- John 9, the ninth chapter of the Gospel of John
