= Theodore II (exarch) =

Theodore II (Latin: Theodorus; Ancient Greek: Θεόδωρος, romanized: Theódōros) was Exarch of Ravenna from 677 to 687.

Theodore succeeded Gregory in 677. He is recorded as confirming the election of Conon as Pope on 21 October 686.

A pious man, Theodore patronized the Archbishop of Ravenna during his tenure. The historian Andreas Agnellus describes his gifts to the churches of St. Theodore the Deacon and St. Mary of Blachernae and records that the Exarch was buried with his wife in the second monastery. He was, in turn, followed by John II Platyn in 687.

== Notes ==
Preceded by Gregory	Exarch of Ravenna; 678–687	Succeeded by John II Platyn
