= Ioannes II =

Ioannes II (Greek: Ἰωάννης Β΄, "John II") may refer to:

- Patriarch John II of Constantinople (ruled 518–520)
- John II Komnenos (1087–1143), Byzantine emperor
- John II of Trebizond (c. 1262–1297)
- John II Doukas of Thessaly (ruled 1303–1318)
- John II Orsini (ruled 1323–1335)

== See also ==
- John II (disambiguation)
- Ioannes I (disambiguation)
