= John VI =

John VI may refer to:

- Pope John VI (655–705), Pope from 701 to 705
- John VI of Constantinople (died 715), Patriarch of Constantinople from 712 to 715
- John VI, Syriac Orthodox Patriarch of Antioch (936–953)
- Yohannan VI, (fl. 1014), Patriarch of the Church of the East from 1012 to 1016
- Patriarch John VI of Alexandria, Patriarch from 1062 to 1100
- John VI of Naples (died 1120 or 1123), Duke from 1097 or 1107 to his death
- Pope John VI of Alexandria, Coptic Pope from 1189 to 1216
- John VI the Affluent, Armenian Catholicos of the Holy See of Cilicia (1203–1221)
- John VI Kantakouzenos (1292–1383), Byzantine Emperor from 1347 to 1354
- John VI, Count of Harcourt (1342–1389)
- John VI, Duke of Brittany (1389–1442)
- John VI, Duke of Mecklenburg (1439–1474)
- John VI, Count of Oldenburg (1501–1548)
- John VI, Count of Nassau-Dillenburg (1535–1606)
- John VI, Prince of Anhalt-Zerbst (1621–1667)
- John VI of Portugal (1767–1826), King of the United Kingdom of Portugal, Brazil and the Algarves (1816–1825), King of Portugal and of the Algarves (1825–1826)

== See also ==
- John 6, the sixth chapter of the Gospel of John
- Ioannes VI (disambiguation)
