= John VII =

John VII may refer to:

- Pope John VII, Pope from 705 to his death in 707
- Patriarch John VII of Constantinople (died prior to 867), Patriarch from 837 to 843
- John VII of Jerusalem, Greek Orthodox Patriarch of Jerusalem from 964 to 966
- Pope John VII of Alexandria, Coptic Pope from 1262 to 1268 and again from 1271 to 1293
- John VII, Count of Harcourt (1369-1452)
- John VII Palaiologos (1370–1408), Byzantine Emperor for five months in 1390
- John VII of Werle (c. 1375–1414)
- John VII, Count of Oldenburg (1540–1603)
- John VII, Duke of Mecklenburg-Schwerin (1558–1592)
- John VII, Count of Nassau-Siegen (1561–1623)

== See also ==
- John 7, the seventh chapter of the Gospel of John
- Ioannes VII (disambiguation)
