= John (1790 ship) =

History

Great Britain
- Name: John
- Builder: America
- Fate: Last listed in 1797

General characteristics
- Tons burthen: 129, or 135 (bm)
- Sail plan: Schooner
- Armament: 12 × 3-pounder guns
- Notes: Almost rebuilt 1793

John was registered in Britain in 1790. She reportedly had been launched in the United States, but where and when is obscure. Between 1791 and 1794 she made four voyages as a slave ship in the triangular trade in enslaved people. On her first three voyages at least, the mortality rate among the slaves during the Middle Passage was so low that John's master and surgeon qualified for a bonus payment. In 1795 new owners sailed her as a whaler in the British Southern Whale Fishery. She was last listed in 1797.

== Career ==
John first appeared in Lloyd's Register (LR) in 1791.

Year	Master	Owner	Trade	Source & notes
1791	P.Ryan	Collow	London–Africa	LR; new deck and sides and good repair 1790

The Slave Trade Act 1788 (Dolben's Act) limited the number of enslaved people that British slave ships could transport, based on the ships' tons burthen. It was the first British legislation passed to regulate slave shipping. At a burthen of 129 tons, the cap would have been 215 slaves; at a burthen of 135 tons the cap would have been 225 slaves. After the passage of Dolben's Act, masters received a bonus of £100 for a mortality rate of under 2%; the ship's surgeon received £50. For a mortality rate between two and three per cent, the bonus was halved. There was no bonus if mortality exceeded 3%.

1st voyage transporting enslaved people (1791): Captain Patrick Ryan sailed from London on 4 January 1791. On 4 March John started acquiring captives, first at Anomabu and then at Cape Coast Castle. She sailed from Africa on 25 July having embarked 200 captives, and arrived at St Vincent in September with 197 captives, for a mortality rate of 1%. She arrived back in London on 17 November.

2nd voyage transporting enslaved people (1791–1792): Captain John Frazer sailed from London on 23 December 1791, bound for West Africa. John began acquiring captives on 31 March 1791 at Cape Coast Castle. She left Africa on 20 April, after stopping at Annobon, and arrived at St Vincent on 24 May. She had embarked 201 captivs and she arrived with 200. She arrived back at London on 25 July.

John was raised and almost rebuilt in 1792.

3rd voyage transporting enslaved people (1792–1793): Captain John Frazer sailed from London on 14 October 1792. John started acquiring captives at Cape Coast Castle on 14 October 1792, stopped at Annobon, and left Africa on 9 July 1793. She arrived at St Vincent on 23 August with 225 captives and having lost no captives on the Middle Passage. She arrived back at London on 1 November. At some point George Haliburton had replaced Frazer as master.

John, Haliburton, master, was reported at Ostend, from London on 21 February 1794.

4th voyage transporting enslaved people (1794): Captain George Haliburton sailed from London on 3 March 1794. John started acquiring captives on 1 May, at Cape Coast Castle. She sailed from Africa on 7 June, and arrived at Kingston, Jamaica on 3 August 1794 with 215 captives. She arrived back at London on 4 November 1794.

William Collow sold John and her new owners apparently decided to sail her as whaler.

Year	Master	Owner	Trade	Source & notes
1795	Haliburton; D.Morrillier	W.Collow; Hamilton	London–Africa; London–Southern Fishery	LR; raised and almost rebuilt 1792

On 23 February 1795 John, Merrylee, sailed from Gravesend for the South Seas. LR continued to carry her with stale data and she was last listed in 1797.

Year	Master	Owner	Trade	Source & notes
1797	Merrilies	Hamilton	London–Southern Fishery	LR
