= Smaragdus =

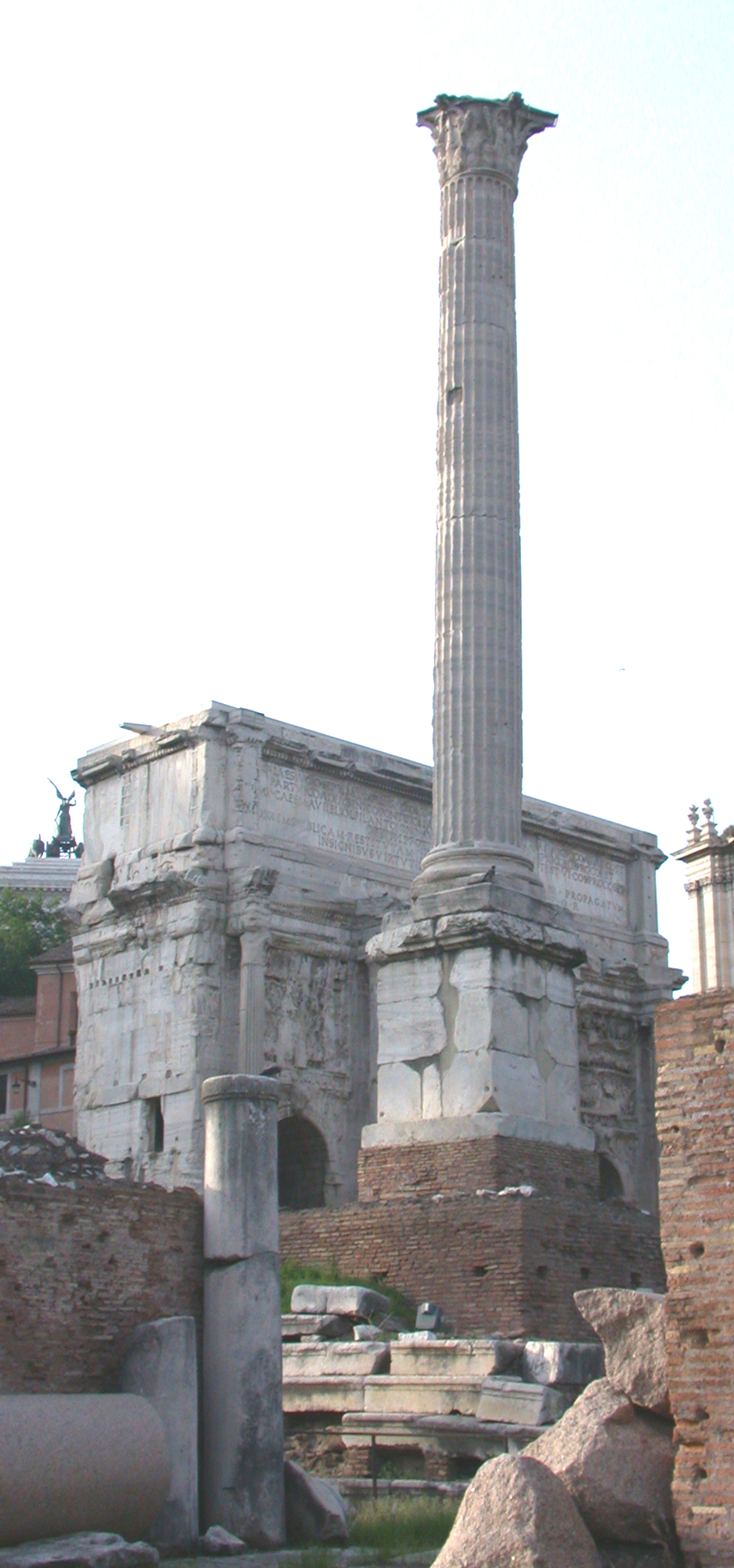
The Column of Phocas, erected by Smaragdus in the Roman Forum.

Smaragdus (Latin: Smaragdus, Ancient Greek: Σμαράγδος, romanized: Smarágdos) was Exarch of Ravenna from 585 to 589 and again from 603 to 611.

During his first tenure, Smaragdus made an alliance with the Franks and Avars against the perennial foes of the Exarchate, the Lombards, and appeared poised to extinguish the Lombard power before it had been fully established. However, the effort came to nothing, for the Franks were not as serious about fighting the Lombards as Smaragdus was. One notable military achievement during his first reign was the recovery of Classis, the port of Ravenna, from the Lombards in 588.

Smaragdus was also known for his violence toward the followers of the schismatic bishops during the schism of the Three Chapters. These included Severinus, Archbishop of Aquileia and his followers, then at Grado, whom he ordered to attend a synod at Ravenna. When the council failed to solve any major issues, he forced the archbishop to declare his loyalty to the Orthodox creed. His violence, combined with alleged charges of insanity, prompted his removal from office in 589.

In 603, the Byzantine emperor Phocas restored Smaragdus to his former position. Smaragdus inherited a war with the Lombards from his predecessor Callinicus, and refused to give up the daughter of the Lombard king Agilulf, as well as her husband, both of whom had been taken prisoner by the Byzantines in 601. That same year, Agilulf besieged Cremona with the help of the Avars, capturing it on 21 August 605 and afterwards razing the city; next he captured Mantua on 1 September. When his army reached the fortress of Vulturina, the garrison surrendered, firing the town of Brescello as they fled. Smaragdus was forced to release his hostages in April 605 in order to gain peace. The peace with the Lombards held for the rest of his administration.

Smaragdus erected a gilded statue of Phocas on the column of Phocas in the Roman Forum. After Phocas was deposed by Heraclius in 610, Smaragdus was replaced again, this time by John I.

Preceded by Decius	Exarch of Ravenna; 585–589	Succeeded by Romanus
Preceded by Callinicus	Exarch of Ravenna; 603–611	Succeeded by John I
