= Ioannes VI =

Ioannes VI (Ancient Greek: Ἰωάννης ΣΤʹ, Iōannēs ST΄) may refer to:

- John VI of Constantinople (Patriarch from 712 to 715)
- John VI Kantakouzenos (c. 1292–1383)
- Pope John VI, Pope from 655 to 705

== See also ==
- John VI (disambiguation)
