= Eleutherius (exarch) =

Eleutherius (Ancient Greek: Ελευθέριος, romanized: Eleuthérios; died 620) was the exarch of Ravenna from 615 to 619, succeeding the eunuch John I.

Early in his reign, nearly the entire exarchate was unstable. In Ravenna, there was obvious discontent with the Byzantines; in Naples, a certain John of Conza separated the city from the exarch's control. Eleutherius arrived in Ravenna and immediately put to death "all who had been implicated in the death of Exarch John and the judges of the State." Then, after making a courtesy visit to Pope Deusdedit, Eleutherius marched on Naples, and captured that city, killing the rebel John and his supporters. However, soon after the Lombards threatened war. Eleutherius was able to sue for peace, promising a yearly tribute.

Finding the situation in Italy to be unsatisfactory and taking advantage of the Byzantine Emperor Heraclius' preoccupation with the Sassanids, Eleutherius proclaimed himself emperor in 619, with the intent of setting up his capital in Rome. The following year, while on his way to Rome and still deciding how to convince Pope Boniface V to grant him a crown, he was murdered by his soldiers at the fortress of Luceoli, and his head was sent to Heraclius.

Preceded by John I (exarch)	Exarch of Ravenna; 616–619	Succeeded by Isaac the Armenian
