= Yohannes Bahçecioğlu =

German footballer

Personal information
- Full name: Yohannes Bahçecioğlu
- Date of birth: 26 February 1988 (age 38)
- Place of birth: Cologne, West Germany
- Height: 1.76 m (5 ft 9 in)
- Position: Midfielder

Youth career
- Bayer Leverkusen
- –2005: PSI Yurdumspor Köln
- 2005–2006: Bonner SC
- 2006–2007: 1. FC Köln

Senior career*
Years	Team	Apps	(Gls)
2007–2010	1. FC Köln II	73	(2)
2010–2012	Rot-Weiß Oberhausen	11	(1)
2010–2012	Rot-Weiß Oberhausen II	14	(2)
2013–2014	Hilal Bergheim	25	(0)
2016	SC West Köln	3	(0)
Total		126	(5)
- * Club domestic league appearances and goals

Yohannes Bahçecioğlu (born 26 February 1988) is a German former footballer who played as a midfielder.
