= John (1804 ship) =

History

United Kingdom
- Name: John
- Builder: Chepstow
- Launched: 1804
- Fate: Wrecked 30 June 1827

General characteristics
- Tons burthen: 433 (bm)

John was launched at Chepstow in 1804. She then became a West Indiaman, sailing between Bristol and Jamaica. In 1826 she started sailing to Bengal under a license from the British East India Company (EIC). She was wrecked on 30 June 1827 on such a voyage.

== Career ==
John was built for J. Maxse & Co., of Bristol. John first appeared in Lloyd's Register (LR) in 1806.

Year	Master	Owner	Trade	Source
1806	[Samuel] Pritchard	Maxse & Co.	Bristol–Jamaica	LR
1812	Pritchard; J[ohn] Hoddrell (Hoddell)	J.Maxse	Bristol–Jamaica	LR
1818	J.Hoddell	Vaughn & Co.	Bristol–Jamaica	LR

John, Hoddell, master, arrived in Jamaica in February 1818 from Bristol. While off the coast of Ireland she had lost her rudder, which had left her in great distress for some days. The crew succeeded eventually in hanging a rudder that was twice lost. Eventually they were able to mount a third rudder and reach Jamaica. On 8 March John, Hoddell, master, was lying in Great River, by Montego Bay, when a storm drove her and other vessels ashore. She was gotten off without any damage.

Year	Master	Owner	Trade	Source
1820	J.Hoddell; J.Wheeler	Vaughn & Co.	Bristol–Jamaica	LR
1826	J[ohn] Wheeler; Dowson	J.Drew	Plymouth; London–Isle of France	LR

In 1813 the EIC had lost its monopoly on the trade between India and Britain. British ships were then free to sail to India or the Indian Ocean under a license from the EIC. John, W.Dawson, master, sailed for Bengal on 26 June 1826. She was sailing under such a license.

== Fate ==
John was wrecked on 30 June 1827 on Western Sea Reef in the Bay of Bengal with the loss of four lives. Windsor and Woodford rescued 17 survivors. John had been on a voyage from London to Calcutta.
