= John IV =

John IV may refer to:

- Patriarch John IV of Alexandria, Patriarch between 569 and 579
- John IV of Armenia, Catholicos of Armenia between 833 and 855
- John IV of Constantinople (died 595), Patriarch from 582
- Pope John IV (died 642), Pope from 640
- Pope John IV of Alexandria, Coptic Pope from 777 to 799
- John IV (bishop of Naples) (died 835)
- John IV of Naples, Duke from 997 to after 1002
- John IV of Gaeta (died 1012)
- John IV of Ohrid, Archbishop of Ohrid in 1139/43–1157/64
- John IV, Count of Soissons (died 1302)
- John IV Laskaris (1250–1305), Emperor of Nicaea from 1259 to 1261
- John IV of Brittany (1339–1399), Duke of Brittany, Count of Montfort, 7th Earl of Richmond
- John IV, Lord of Arkel (died 1360)
- John IV, Count of Sponheim-Starkenburg (died 1414)
- John IV, Duke of Saxe-Lauenburg (died 1414)
- John IV, Duke of Mecklenburg (died 1422)
- John IV, Count of Katzenelnbogen (died 1444)
- John IV, Count of Armagnac (1396–1450), Count of Armagnac, Fézensac, and Rodez
- John IV, Duke of Brabant (1403–1427)
- John IV of Trebizond (1403–1460), Emperor of Trebizond
- John IV, Count of Nassau-Siegen (1410–1475), Count of Nassau, Vianden and Diez
- John IV, Marquess of Montferrat (1412–1464)
- Jan IV of Oświęcim (1426/1430–1497), Duke of Gliwice
- John IV, Duke of Bavaria (1437–1463)
- John IV, Landgrave of Leuchtenberg (1470–1531)
- John IV, Duke of Krnov (died 1483), Duke of Wodzisław Śląski
- John IV of Chalon-Arlay (1443–1502), prince of Orange
- Ivan IV the Terrible (1530–1584), Czar of Russia
- John IV, Count of Nassau-Idstein (1603–1677)
- John IV of Portugal (1604–1656), known as John II, Duke of Braganza, before 1640
- Yohannes IV of Ethiopia (1837–1889)
- Jean, Count of Paris (born 1965), Orléanist pretender to the French throne as Jean IV

== See also ==
- John 4, the fourth chapter of the Gospel of John
- John Ernest IV, Duke of Saxe-Coburg-Saalfeld (1658–1729)
- Ioannes IV (disambiguation)
- Johann IV (disambiguation)
