= Truesdell Sparhawk Brown =

American historian

Truesdell Sparhawk Brown (21 March 1906, Philadelphia – 13 January 1992, Houston) was a classical scholar, ancient historian, and co-founder of the journal California Studies in Classical Antiquity, which became the journal Classical Antiquity.

== Biography ==
Brown attended Haverford College in 1922–1923 and then transferred to Harvard University, where he received his A.B in 1928 and his M.A. in 1929. He was an instructor in ancient history at the University of Colorado from 1929 to 1932 and from 1933 to 1937 with an interruption for the academic year 1932–1933 when he studied under C. F. Lehmann-Haupt at the University of Innsbruck.

Brown was an instructor and then assistant professor at the University of Texas, Austin during the years 1940–1947 with a 2-year interruption in 1942–1944 when he was an instructor at the U. S. Naval Flight Preparatory School in Austin. In 1947 he received a PhD from Columbia University under William Linn Westermann (1873–1954) with a thesis on Onesicritus.

Brown was employed for the remainder of his career at the University of California, Los Angeles, where he was a lecturer in 1947–1948, assistant professor in 1948–1951, associate professor in 1951–1956, and professor in 1956–1973, retiring as professor emeritus in 1973.

He was the chair of the UCLA history department in 1959–1962. He was a Fulbright Fellow in 1950 in Greece and a Guggenheim Fellow in the academic year 1954–1955 in England. Brown was a co-founder and, in the years 1967–1970, senior editor, along with W. Kendrick Pritchett, of the journal California Studies in Classical Antiquity. In 1980 colleagues and former students published a festschrift in his honor.

== Books ==
- Onesicritus: A study in Hellenistic historiography. Berkeley: U. of California Press. 1949. viii+196 p.
- Timaeus of Tauromenium. U. of California Press. 1958. vii+165 p.
- as editor: Ancient Greece. NY: Free Press of Glencoe. 1965. viii+262 p.
- Greek historians. Lexington, Mass: Heath. 1973. 208 p. ISBN 0669838810.
