= Callinicus (exarch) =

Callinicus (Ancient Greek: Καλλίνικος, romanized: Kallínikos) was the exarch of Ravenna from 597 until 602 or 603. He is called Gallicinus by the Lombard historian Paul the Deacon.

The first few years of his administration were marked by relatively good fortune. In 599, he won a victory over the Slavs. In 598 an armistice between the Byzantines and the Lombards had been concluded in which the Lombards were acknowledged as sovereign rulers of the lands in their possession, and which was observed by both parties over the following years. However around 601, Callinicus took advantage of a rebellion by Dukes Gaidoald of Trent and Gisulf II of Friuli to break the peace by kidnapping the Lombard king Agilulf's daughter and her husband, Duke Godescalc of Parma. In response, Agilulf invaded the Exarchate, destroying Padua, pillaging Istria, then defeating Callinicus outside the walls of Ravenna.

Shortly afterwards Callinicus was replaced by Smaragdus; Richards states Callinicus was recalled.

Preceded by Romanus	Exarch of Ravenna; 598–603	Succeeded by Smaragdus
