= Ioannes IV =

Ioannes IV (Ancient Greek: Ἰωάννης Δ΄, Iōannēs D΄) may refer to:

- Patriarch John IV of Constantinople (died in 595)
- John IV, Archbishop of Ohrid (c. 1088 – 1163/64)
- John IV Laskaris (1250–c. 1305)
- John IV Megas Komnenos (c. 1403–1459), emperor of Trebizond

== See also ==
- John IV (disambiguation)
