= Woodford (1819 ship) =

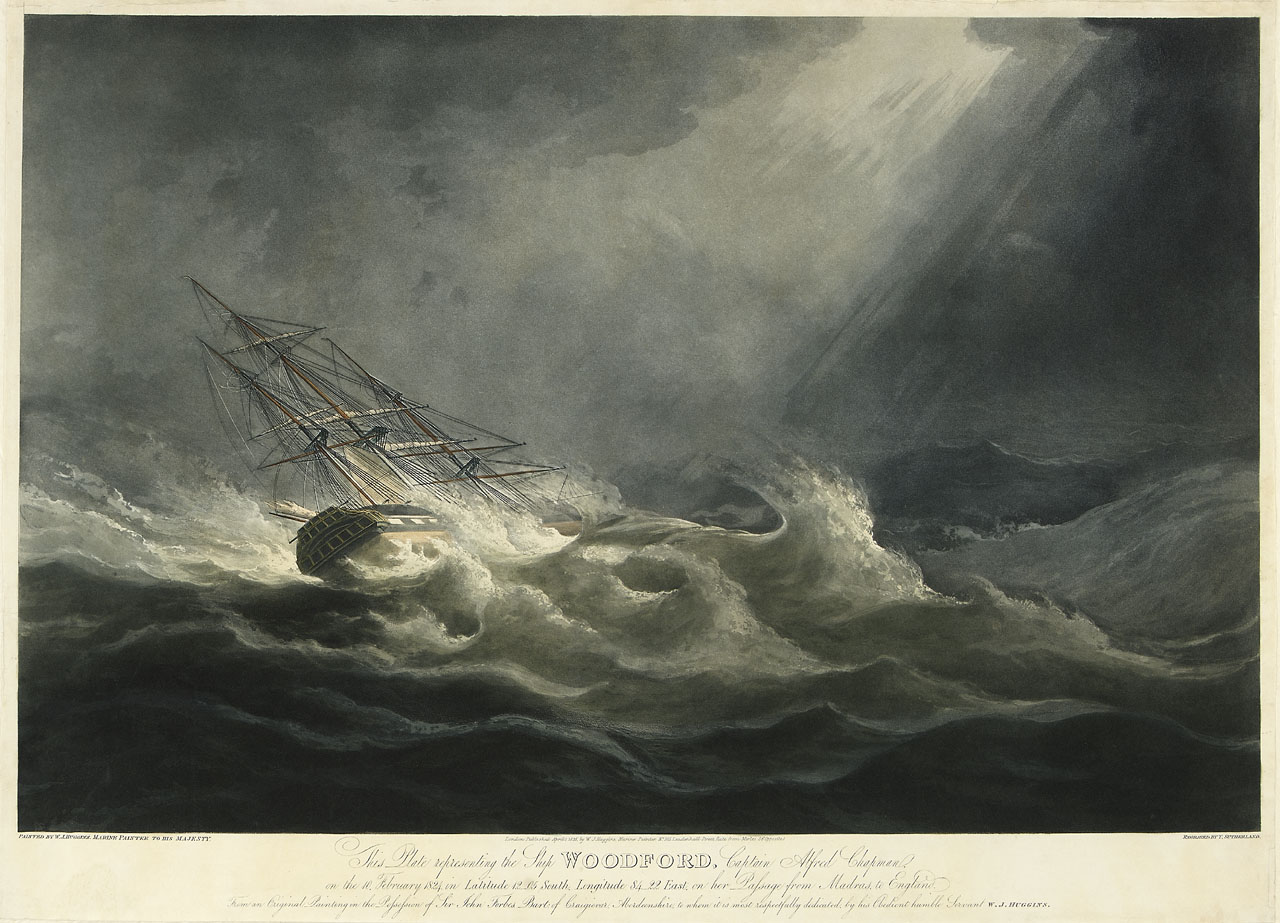
- The Ship Woodford... Captain Alfred Chapman... 1824... on her Passage from Madras to England (stern view), William John Huggins, National Maritime Museum, Greenwich

History

United Kingdom
- Name: Woodford
- Owner: Aaron Chapman, or Abel and Arthur Chapman
- Builder: G. Hillhouse, Sons & Co., Bristol
- Launched: 22 October 1819
- Fate: Foundered February 1829

General characteristics
- Tons burthen: 522, or 544, or 54423/94, or 594 (bm)
- Length: 120 ft 9 in (36.8 m) (keel)
- Beam: 31 ft 9 in (9.7 m)
- Propulsion: Sail

Woodford was launched at Bristol in 1819. She made one voyage as an "extra ship" for the British East India Company (EIC). She also made two voyages transporting convicts from England to Van Diemen's Land. She sank in February 1829 off Madagascar.

== Career ==
Woodford entered Lloyd's Register (LR) in 1820 with Chapman, master, Chapman, owner, and trade London-India.

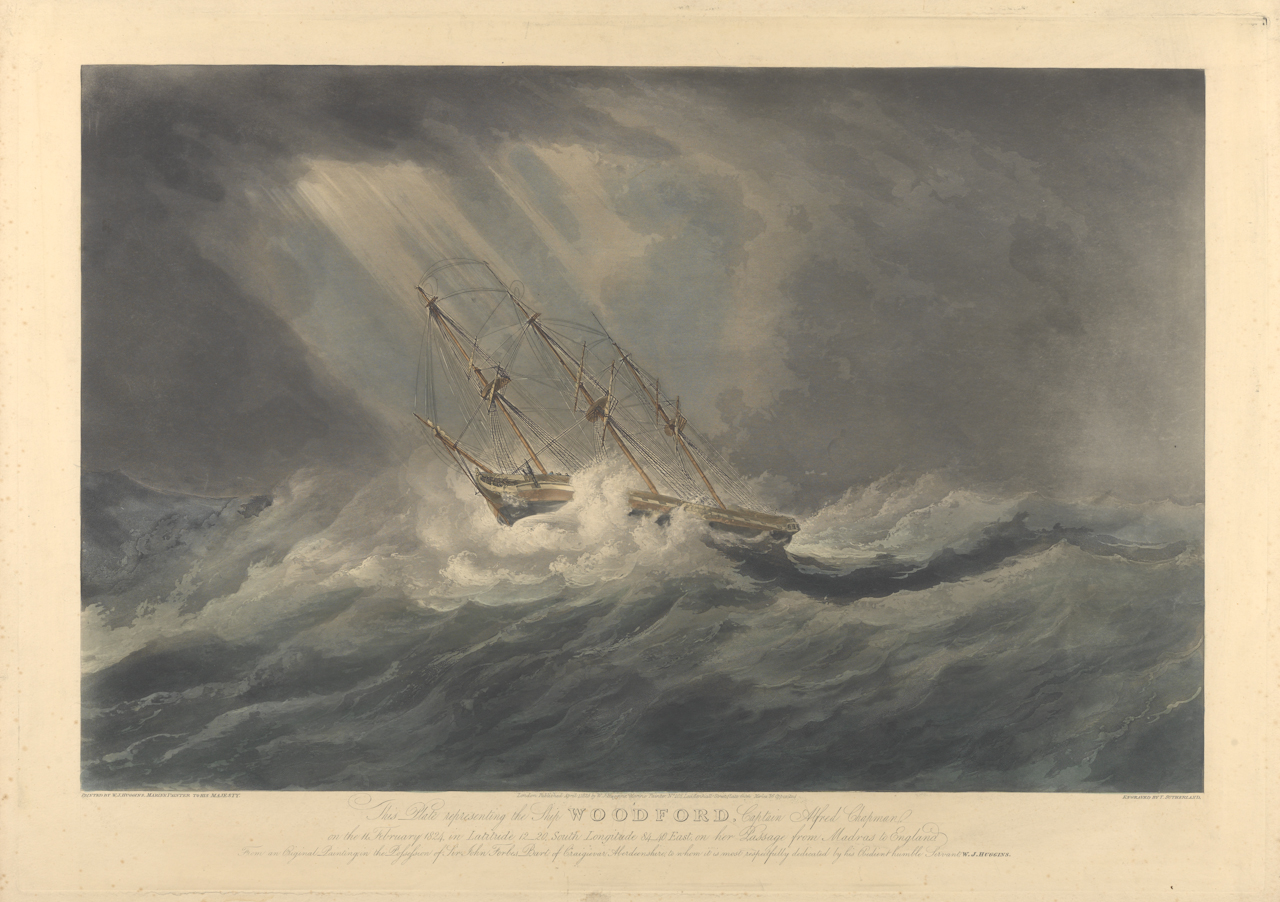
This Plate representing the Ship Woodford - Captain Alfred Chapman - 1824 - on her Passage from Madras to England (bow view)

EIC voyage (1820–1821): Captain Alfred Chapman sailed from the Downs on 12 April 1820 bound for Madras. Woodford reached Madras on 31 July. She left on 9 October, reached Saint Helena on 18 December, and arrived at the Downs on 4 February 1821. The EIC had chartered her for the one voyage at a rate of £10 19s 6d per ton.

First convict voyage to Van Diemen's Land (1826): Woodford, Edward Chapman, master, and James Dickson, surgeon, left London on 5 August 1826 and arrived Hobart Town on 22 November. She embarked 100 male convicts, one of whom died on the voyage. On Christmas Day Woodford arrived at Sydney from Hobart. She was carrying passengers and 13 convicts who would be transhipped to Norfolk Island. Woodford left Sydney on 26 January 1827 for Calcutta. Among her passengers were Colonel Cameron and part of the 3rd Regiment of Foot.

Boats from a Woodford rescued the crew of John in July 1827. John wrecked on Western Sea Reef (21°17′36″N 87°45′32″E) on 30 June 1827 as she was sailing from Calcutta to England. Windsor may also have participated in the rescue.

Also Lloyd's List reported on 30 November 1827 that lightning had struck Woodford at Kedgeree.

Second convict voyage to Van Diemen's Land (1828): Woodford, John Milbank, master, and William Petrie, surgeon, sailed from Portsmouth on 2 May 1828 and arrived at Hobart Town on 25 August. She embarked 184 male convicts, none of whom died on the voyage. A detachment of troops from the 26th, 39th, and 57th Regiments of Foot provided the guard. Woodford left Sydney on 25 September for Batavia with a cargo of oil.

== Fate ==
Woodford left Soorabaya for Cowes on 12 December 1828. She was carrying rice, sugar, pepper, and so forth. She foundered some 500 miles off the coast of Madagascar on 14 February 1829.

A hard gale on 13 February swamped her, and caused leaks that overwhelmed the pumps. On the 14th Milbank and the crew were able to get the boat out and put aboard seven gallons of rum, 200 pounds of bread, and 20 pieces of pork. The 35 crew and four passengers then boarded the boat at a location that Milbank estimated as 29°2′S 51°20′E. On the morning of the 15th Milbank steered for Cape St Mary, Madagascar, which he estimated as being 450 miles away.

On the 18th, after the boat had been at sea for 64 hours, the survivors encountered Scipio, Petrie, master, which took all 39 crew and passengers aboard. (Note: Scipio appears to have been a barque of 449 tons (bm), launched at New Brunswick in 1826.) Scipio, which had been sailing from Singapore back to Liverpool, took them to the Cape of Good Hope. The survivors expressed their thanks to Petrie and a Mr. Counter, a passenger on Scipio, for the "assiduous care" that the survivors had received.
