= John V =

John V may refer to:

- Patriarch John V of Alexandria or John the Merciful (died by 620), Patriarch of Alexandria from 606 to 616
- John V of Constantinople, Patriarch from 669 to 675
- Pope John V (685–686), Pope from 685 to his death in 686
- John V of Jerusalem, Greek Orthodox Patriarch of Jerusalem in 706–735
- John V the Historian or Hovhannes Draskhanakerttsi, Catholicos of Armenia from 897 to 925
- John V of Gaeta (1010–1040)
- John V of Naples (died 1042), Duke from 1036 to 1042
- Pope John V of Alexandria, Coptic Pope from 1147 to 1166
- John V, Count of Soissons, (1281–1304)
- John V, Margrave of Brandenburg-Salzwedel (1302–1317)
- John V Palaiologos (1332–1391), Byzantine Emperor from 1341
- John V, Count of Sponheim-Starkenburg (1359–1437), German nobleman
- John V, Lord of Arkel (1362–1428)
- John V, Duke of Brittany (1389–1442), Count of Montfort
- John V, Duke of Mecklenburg (1418–1443)
- John V, Count of Hoya (died 1466), nicknamed the Pugnacious or the Wild
- John V, Count of Armagnac (1420–1473)
- John V, Duke of Saxe-Lauenburg (1439–1507)
- John V, Count of Oldenburg (1460–1526)
- John V, Prince of Anhalt-Zerbst (1504–1551), German prince of the House of Ascania and ruler of Anhalt-Dessau
- John V of Portugal (1689–1750), King of Portugal and the Algarves

== See also ==
- John 5, the fifth chapter of the Gospel of John
- John 5 (guitarist) (John William Lowery, born 1971), American guitarist
- Johann V, Duke of Mecklenburg-Schwerin
- Jean V de Bueil (1406–1477)
