= John III =

John III may refer to:

== People ==
- Pope John II (III) of Alexandria, Patriarch of Alexandria from 505 to 516
- John III (bishop of Jerusalem) in 516–524
- Pope John III, Pope from 561 to his death in 574
- John Scholasticus, Patriarch of Constantinople from 565 to his death in 577
- Pope John III of Alexandria, Coptic Pope from 680 to 689
- John III Rizocopo, Exarch of Ravenna from 710 to 711
- John III the Philosopher, Catholicos of Armenia from 717 to 728
- John III of the Sedre, Syriac Orthodox Patriarch of Antioch from 631 to his death in 648
- John III of Naples, Duke from 928 to his death in 968
- John III of Gaeta, Duke from 984 to his death in 1008
- John III of Amalfi, Duke in 1073
- John III Doukas Vatatzes (c. 1192 – 1254), Emperor of Nicaea
- John III Comyn of Badenoch (died 1306)
- John III, Duke of Brittany (1286–1341)
- John III, Duke of Brabant (1300–1355)
- John III Megas Komnenos (c. 1321 – 1362), Emperor of Trebizond
- John III of Montferrat (c. 1362 – 1381)
- John III, Burgrave of Nuremberg (c. 1369 – 1420)
- John III, Count of Auvergne (1467–1501)
- Ivan III of Russia (1440–1505), Grand Duke of Russia since 1462
- John III of Navarre (1469–1516)
- John III Crispo, Duke of the Archipelago (1480–1494)
- John III, Duke of Cleves (1490–1539)
- John III of Portugal (1502–1557), King of Portugal and of the Algarves
- John III of Sweden (1537–1592)
- John III Sobieski (1629–1696), King of Poland and Grand Duke of Lithuania
- Yohannes III of Ethiopia (c. 1824 – c. 1873), Emperor several times between 1840 and 1851
- Prince Juan, Count of Montizón, Carlist pretender to the title, Juan III, King of Spain, 1861-1868 and Legitimist pretender to title, Jean III, King of France.
- Prince Jean, Duke of Guise, pretended to the title John III, King of the French, 1926–1940
- Infante Juan, Count of Barcelona, pretended to the title Juan III, King of Spain, 1941–1977
- John Ernest III, Duke of Saxe-Weimar (1664–1707)
- John Frederick III, Duke of Saxony (1538–1565)
- John William III, Duke of Saxe-Eisenach (1666–1729)
- Jean, Grand Duke of Luxembourg, the 3rd ruler of Luxembourg of that name

== Biblical ==
- John 3, the third chapter of the Gospel of John
- Third Epistle of John or 3 John
- Ioannes III (disambiguation)
