= John III Rizocopus =

John III Rizocopus (Latin: Iohannes Rizocopus; Ancient Greek: Ιωάννης Ριζοκόπος, romanized: Iōánnēs Rizokópos) was Exarch of Ravenna from 710 until his death one year later in 711.

Following the restoration of the Byzantine Emperor Justinian II, he sent a military force to savage Ravenna. "Apparently," writes Jeffrey Richards, "some prominent Ravennates were involved in the revolt which overthrew Justinian and when he returned to power he determined to revenge himself on the entire city." The Archbishop Felix was arrested with other prominent citizens and taken to Constantinople, and the city plundered and burned.

In response, the citizens and soldiers of Ravenna rebelled, making one George the son of Johannicus their leader, whose father was one of the captives taken to Constantinople. John was appointed Exarch not long after this, and landed at Naples with loyal troops, where he encountered Pope Constantine responding to an Imperial summons to Constantinople. John then proceeded to Ravenna by way of Rome, where he "cut the throats" of several senior papal officials, according to the Liber Pontificalis. Richards explains this violent act by pointing out "the inclusion of the papal steward and the papal treasurer among the victims suggests a bid to plunder the papal treasury."

John Rizocopus continued to Ravenna, where he died shortly after, although the details are not recorded. The Liber Pontificalis does record that in Ravenna "by God's judgment on his atrocious deeds he [John] died an ignominious death". Whether his death was due to illness or a revolt by the Ravennese is impossible to determine, but the latter is more likely, given the subsequent dispatch of a punitive expedition. The strategos of Sicily, Theodore, was placed in charge of the latter, and imprisoned and executed the leaders of the Ravennese revolt, including Archbishop Felix, who was deported to Constantinople, blinded and exiled to the Crimea.

Preceded by Theophylactus	Exarch of Ravenna; 710–711	Vacant Title next held by Scholasticus
