= John I (exarch) =

John I (Latin: Iohannes; Ancient Greek: Ιωάννης, romanized: Iōánnēs; died 615) was Exarch of Ravenna from 611 until his death in 615.

John was made Exarch of Ravenna in 611, to replace Smaragdus. He seems to have avoided war with the Lombards throughout his 4 year reign from 611 to 615. In 615 he was killed along with a number of other officials. The Liber Pontificalis mentions that one of the first acts of his successor, Eleutherius, was to kill the persons accused of playing a role in the Exarch John's death.

Preceded by Smaragdus	Exarch of Ravenna; 611–615	Succeeded by Eleutherius
