= John VIII =

John VIII may refer to:

- Pope John VIII, Pope from 872 to 882
- Antipope John VIII, antipope in 844
- John VIII bar Abdoun, Syriac Orthodox Patriarch of Antioch (944–1033)
- John VIII of Constantinople, Patriarch of Constantinople (1010–1075)
- Pope John VIII of Alexandria, Coptic Pope from 1300 to 1320
- John VIII Palaiologos, Byzantine Emperor (1392–1448)
- John VIII, Count of Harcourt, 1398–1424
- John VIII, Count of Vendôme, 1426–1477
- John VIII, Archbishop of Antivari, d. 1571
- John VIII, Count of Nassau-Siegen, 1583–1638
- The mythical Pope Joan, in some versions of her legend

== See also ==
- John 8, the eighth chapter of the Gospel of John
