= Exarchate of Ravenna =

Eastern Roman administrative division (584–751)

Exarchate of Ravenna Exarchatus Ravennatis Ἐξαρχᾶτον τῆς Ῥαβέννης
- Exarchate of the Byzantine Empire
- 584–751
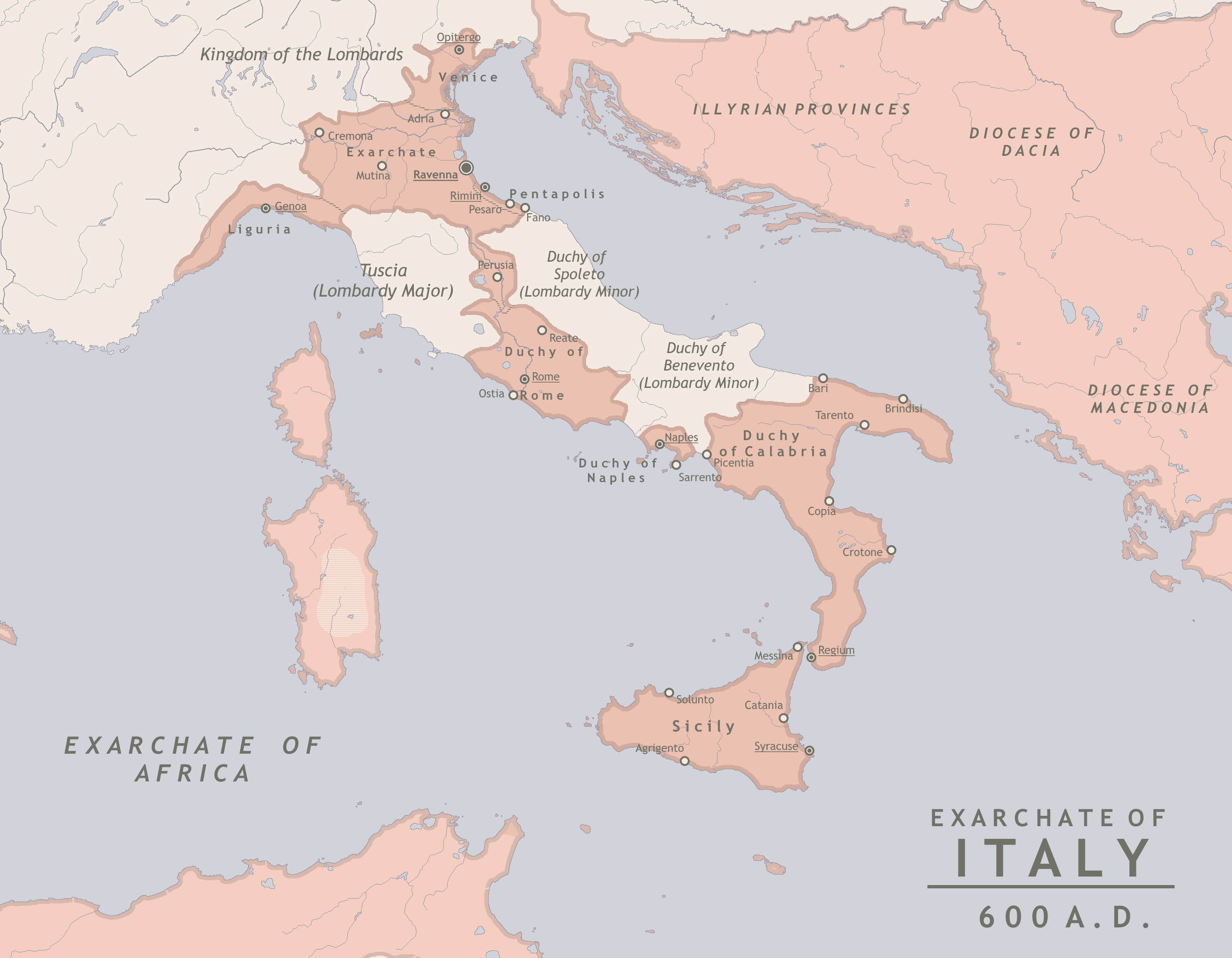
- Map of the Exarchate of Ravenna within the Byzantine Empire in 600
- Capital: Ravenna
- Government
- Exarch
  - 584–585: Decius (first)
  - 726–751: Eutychius (last)
- Historical era: Early Middle Ages
  - Lombard invasion of Italy: 568
  - Foundation of Exarchate: 584
  - Death of Eutychius: 751
Preceded by
Praetorian prefecture of Italy
Succeeded by
Republic of Venice
Kingdom of the Lombards
Papal States
Catepanate of Italy
Tyrrhenian duchies

The Exarchate of Ravenna (Latin: Exarchatus Ravennatis; Greek: Ἐξαρχᾶτον τῆς Ῥαβέννης, romanized: Exarcháton tís Ravénis), also known as the Exarchate of Italy, was an exarchate (administrative district) of the Eastern Roman Empire comprising, between the 6th and 8th centuries, the territories under the jurisdiction of the exarch of Italy (exarchus Italiae) resident in Ravenna. The term is used in historiography in a double sense: "exarchate" in the strict sense denotes the territory under the direct jurisdiction of the exarch, i.e. the area of the capital Ravenna, but the term is mainly used to designate all the Byzantine territories in continental and peninsular Italy. According to the legal sources of the time, these territories constituted the so-called Provincia Italiae, on the basis of the fact that they too, until at least the end of the 7th century, fell under the jurisdiction of the exarch and were governed by duces or magistri militum under him.

The exarchate was established around 584, the year in which the presence of an exarch in Ravenna is attested for the first time, as a consequence of the perpetual state of war with the Lombards (who in the meantime had stolen approximately two thirds of the Byzantine lands in continental and peninsular Italy), which necessarily entailed the militarization of Byzantine Italy. The necessities of war pushed military commanders to centralize powers, thus depriving the civil authorities which are no longer attested by sources starting from the second half of the 7th century. Thus the separation of civil and military powers introduced by Diocletian and Constantine disappeared. Byzantine Italy was divided into various military districts governed by duces or magistri militum dependent on the exarch of Italy, the military governor with full powers chosen by the emperor from among his generals or trusted officials to govern and defend the remaining territories italics. These districts gradually evolved into increasingly autonomous duchies.

Starting from the second half of the 7th century, the autonomist tendencies of the local aristocracies and the ever-increasing temporal political role of the Church of Rome led to a progressive weakening of imperial authority in Italy. Byzantine Italy had now fragmented into a series of autonomous duchies outside the effective control of the exarch, whose authority no longer extended beyond the Ravenna area. Fiscal and religious conflicts between the Papacy and Byzantium accelerated the disintegration of the exarchate. The armies, recruited from the local population, tended to take the pontiff's defense, and did not hesitate to turn on the exarch if he plotted against the Papacy. The Lombards took advantage of this to extend their conquests in an attempt to unify Italy under their domination. The exarchate fell in 751 with the Lombard conquest of Ravenna at the hands of the Lombard king Aistulf. This would be followed by Rome with the separation of the Papal States in 756, reducing Byzantine control to no more than Southern Italy.

The loss of the Exarchate of Ravenna is considered to a possible end date for the end of Late Antiquity. The loss of its Italian territories meant that Constantinople no longer controlled significant areas of Latin-speakers. It heralded the transformation of Byzantium into a regional power.

== Introduction ==
In 395 Theodosius I bequeathed the throne of the Roman Empire to his two sons: Arcadius was Emperor of the East; Honorius became Western Roman Emperor. The Roman Empire would never return to a single ruler.

The Prefecture of Italy suffered the invasion of barbarians in the 5th century: the first to cross the Alps was Alaric, king of the Visigoths. He arrived in Aquileia in 401 and from there headed for Milan, which he besieged the following year. Honorius, no longer feeling safe, moved to Ravenna and established the new capital of the Western Empire there.

In 476 Ravenna fell due to a military coup d'état by the general Odoacer who, at the head of a militia of Heruli, Sciri, Rugii and Turcilingi mercenaries (i.e. the Germanic component of the imperial troops), ousted Romulus Augustulus and took possession of the city. The kingdom of Odoacer, the first Roman-barbarian kingdom to exist in Italy, was short-lived: in 493 Odoacer was defeated by the king of the Ostrogoths, Theodoric, who became the new lord of Italy. The new Ostrogothic Kingdom established by Theodoric continued to maintain, as previously, the Roman provincial and state organisation.

Around the middle of the 6th century, Emperor Justinian I launched an expansive series of campaigns for the reconquest of the West and in particular Italy. On the peninsula the emperor began the long and bloody war against the Ostrogoths. In 540 Ravenna, capital of the Goths and seat of the prefecture, was reconquered and the Byzantines began to appoint their own prefects there. The long campaign ended only in 552-554 with the decisive expedition of the general Narses.

On 13 August 554, with the promulgation in Constantinople by Justinian of a pragmatica sanctio pro petitione Vigilii (pragmatic sanction on the requests of Pope Vigilius), the Prefecture of Italy returned, although not yet completely pacified, to Roman dominion. However, Sicily and Dalmatia were separated from the Prefecture of Italy: the former did not become part of any prefecture, being governed by a praetor dependent on Constantinople, while the latter was aggregated to the Prefecture of Illyricum. Consequently, at the end of the conflict, the prefecture of Italy, also called Provincia Italiae by the Pragmatic Sanction as if to demonstrate a loss of importance, was reduced to only continental and peninsular Italy. Sardinia and Corsica were conquered by the Vandals in the 5th century. After Justinian's reconquest they became part of the Praetorian prefecture of Africa.

Narses still remained in Italy with extraordinary powers and also reorganized the defensive, administrative and fiscal apparatus. Four military commands were allocated to defend the prefecture, one in Forum Iulii, one in Trento, one in the region of Lake Maggiore and Como and finally one in the Cottian and Graian Alps.

== Lombard invasion and Byzantine reaction ==
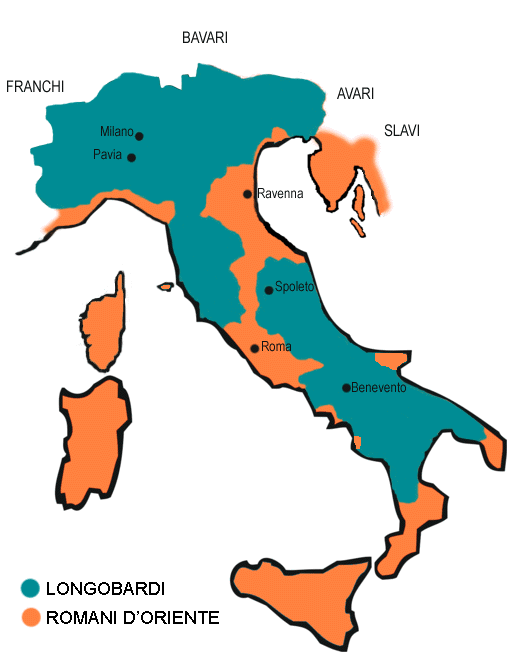
The Byzantines (orange) and the Lombards (cyan) in 590.

In 568, the Lombards under King Alboin, together with other Germanic allies, invaded Northern Italy. The area had only a few years ago been completely pacified, and had suffered greatly during the long Gothic War. The local Byzantine forces were weak and, after taking several towns, in 569 the Lombards conquered Milan. They took Pavia after a three-year siege in 572 and made it their capital. In subsequent years, they took Tuscany. Other military initiatives led by Faroald and Zotto, penetrated into Central and Southern Italy, where they established the duchies of Spoleto and Benevento. However, after Alboin's murder in 573, the Lombards fragmented into several autonomous duchies (the "Rule of the Dukes").

Emperor Justin II tried to take advantage of the Lombardian fragmentation in 576 by sending his son-in-law, Baduarius, to Italy. However, he was defeated and killed in battle, and the continuing crises in the Balkans and the East meant that another imperial effort at reconquest was not possible. Because of the Lombard incursions, the Roman possessions had fragmented into several isolated territories. In 580, Emperor Tiberius II reorganized them into five province eparchies: the Annonaria in northeastern Italy around Ravenna, Calabria, Campania, Aemilia and the Urbicaria around the city of Rome (Urbs). What would become the Republic of Venice was at some point created out of part of the exarchy's territory. The title of the Doge of Venice included the phrase dux Veneciarum provinciae, marking it as a province of the Byzantine Empire.

By the end of the 6th century the new order of powers had settled into a stable pattern. Ravenna, governed by its exarch, who held civil and military authority in addition to his ecclesiastical office, was confined to the city, its port and environs as far north as the Po (bordering territory of the duke of Venice, nominally in imperial service) and south to the Marecchia River, beyond which lay the Duchy of the Pentapolis on the Adriatic, also under a duke nominally representing the Emperor of the East.

== Exarchate ==
The exarchate was organised into a group of duchies (Rome, Venetia, Calabria, Naples, Perugia, Pentapolis, Lucania, etc.) that were mainly the coastal cities in the Italian peninsula since the Lombards held the advantage in the hinterland.

The civil and military head of these imperial possessions, the exarch himself, was the representative at Ravenna of the emperor in Constantinople. The surrounding territory reached from the River Po, which served as the boundary with Venice in the north, to the Pentapolis at Rimini in the south, the border of the "five cities" in the Marches along the Adriatic coast, and reached even cities not on the coast, such as Forlì. All this territory, which lay on the eastern flank of the Apennines, was under the exarch's direct administration and formed the Exarchate in the strictest sense. Surrounding territories were governed by dukes and magistri militum ("masters of the soldiers") more or less subject to his authority. From the perspective of Constantinople, the Exarchate consisted of the province of Italy.

The Exarchate of Ravenna was not the sole Byzantine province in Italy. Byzantine Sicily formed a separate government, and Corsica and Sardinia, while they remained Byzantine, belonged to the Exarchate of Africa.

The Lombards had their capital at Pavia and controlled the great valley of the Po. The Lombard wedge in Italy spread to the south, and established duchies at Spoleto and Beneventum; they controlled the interior, while Byzantine governors more or less controlled the coasts.

Piedmont, Lombardy, the interior mainland of Venetia, Tuscany and the interior of Campania belonged to the Lombards, and bit by bit the Imperial representative in Italy lost all genuine power, though in name he controlled areas like Liguria (completely lost in 640 to the Lombards), or Naples and Calabria (being overrun by the Lombard duchy of Benevento). In Rome, the pope was the real master.

At the end, 740, the Exarchate consisted of Istria, Venetia, Ferrara, Ravenna (the exarchate in the limited sense), with the Pentapolis, and Perugia.

These fragments of the province of Italy, as it was when reconquered for Justinian, were almost all lost, either to the Lombards, who finally conquered Ravenna itself in 751, or by the revolt of the pope, who finally separated from the Empire on the issue of the iconoclastic reforms.

The relationship between the Pope in Rome and the Exarch in Ravenna was a dynamic that could hurt or help the empire. The Papacy could be a vehicle for local discontent. The old Roman senatorial aristocracy resented being governed by an Exarch who was considered by many a meddlesome foreigner. Thus the exarch faced threats from outside as well as from within, hampering much real progress and development.

In its internal history, the exarchate was subject to the splintering influences that were leading to the subdivision of sovereignty and the establishment of feudalism throughout Europe. Step by step, and in spite of the efforts of the emperors at Constantinople, the great imperial officials became local landowners, the lesser owners of land were increasingly kinsmen or at least associates of these officials, and new allegiances intruded on the sphere of imperial administration. Meanwhile, the necessity for providing for the defence of the imperial territories against the Lombards led to the formation of local militias, who at first were attached to the imperial regiments, but gradually became independent, as they were recruited entirely locally. These armed men formed the exercitus romanae militiae, who were the forerunners of the free armed burghers of the Italian cities of the Middle Ages. Other cities of the exarchate were organized on the same model.

== End of the Exarchate ==
During the 6th and 7th centuries, the growing menace of the Lombards and the Franks, as well as the split between Eastern and Western Christendom inspired both by iconoclastic emperors and medieval developments in Latin theology and culminating in the acrimonious rivalry between the Pope of Rome and the Patriarch of Constantinople, made the position of the exarch more and more untenable. Ravenna remained the seat of the exarch until the revolt of 727 over iconoclasm. Eutychius, the last exarch of Ravenna, was killed by the Lombards in 751.

In 752, the northeastern portion of the Exarchate known as the Ducatus Pentapolis was conquered by King Aistulf of the Lombards. Four years later, after the Franks drove the Lombards out, Pope Stephen II claimed the territory. The Pope's ally in the military action against the Lombards, Pepin the Short, King of the Franks, then donated the conquered lands back to the Papacy; this donation, which was confirmed by Pepin's son Charlemagne in 774, marked the beginning of the temporal power of the popes as the Patrimony of Saint Peter. The archbishoprics within the former exarchate, however, had developed traditions of local secular power and independence, which contributed to the fragmenting localization of powers. Three centuries later, that independence would fuel the rise of the independent communes.

The southern portions of the exarchate including the imperial possessions of the duchy of Naples, Calabria, and Apulia were reorganized as the Catepanate of Italy headquartered in Bari. Parts of Apulia were lost to the Saracens in 847 but recovered in 871. Later after the theme of Sicily was conquered by Arabs the remnants were placed into newly established military/administrative themes of Calabria and Langobardia while the duchy of Naples fractured into the Tyrrhenian duchies and gained de facto independence. Istria at the head of the Adriatic was attached to Dalmatia.

The title of exarch of Ravenna was briefly revived in the 12th century for the archbishops Anselm, Guido and Gerard.

== Exarchs of Ravenna ==
Note: For some exarchs there exists some uncertainty over their exact tenure dates.

- Decius (584–585)
- Smaragdus (585–589)
- Romanus (589–596)
- Callinicus (596–603)
- Smaragdus (603–608)
- John I (608–616)
- Eleutherius (616–619)
- Isaac (625–643)
- Theodore I Calliopas (643–645)
- Plato (645–649)
- Olympius (649–652)
- Theodore I Calliopas (653 – c. 666)
- Gregorios (c. 666)
- Theodore II (678–687)
- John II Platyn (687–702)
- Theophylactus (702–710)
- John III Rizocopus (710–711)
- Scholasticus (713–723)
- Paul (723 to 726–727)
- Eutychius (726–727 to 751)

== Sources ==
- Borri, Francesco (2005). "Duces e magistri militum nell'Italia esarcale (VI-VIII secolo)". Estratto da Reti Medievali Rivista (in Italian). VI (2). Firenze University Press. ISSN 1593-2214. Archived from the original (PDF) on 2008-05-18.
- Brown, Truesdell Sparhawk (1984). Gentlemen and Officers: Imperial Administration and Aristocratic Power in Byzantine Italy, A.D. 554-800. Rome: British School at Rome. ISBN 978-0-904152-09-8.
- Brown, Truesdell Sparhawk (1995). "Byzantine Italy c. 680 - c. 876". The New Cambridge Medieval History. Vol. 2. Cambridge: Cambridge University Press. pp. 320–348. ISBN 978-0-521-36292-4.
- Brown, Thomas S. (2021). "Ravenna and Other Early Rivals of Venice: Comparative Urban and Economic Development in the Upper Adriatic c. 751–1050". Byzantium, Venice and the Medieval Adriatic: Spheres of Maritime Power and Influence, c. 700-1453. Cambridge: Cambridge University Press. pp. 173–187. ISBN 978-1-108-84070-5.
- Conti, P. M. (1975). L'Italia bizantina nella 'Descriptio orbis romani' di Giorgio Ciprio, Memorie (in Italian). La Spezia: G-Capellini XL.
- Diehl, Charles (1888). Études sur l'administration byzantine dans l'exarchat de Ravenne (568-751) (in French). Paris: Ernest Thorin.
- Gelichi, Sauro (2021). "The Venetiae, the Exarchate and the Pentapolis". A Companion to Byzantine Italy. Boston-Leiden: Brill. pp. 360–386. ISBN 978-90-04-30770-4.
- Hallenbeck, Jan T. (1982). "Pavia and Rome: The Lombard Monarchy and the Papacy in the Eighth Century". Transactions of the American Philosophical Society. 72 (4): 1–186. doi:10.2307/1006429. JSTOR 1006429. (ISBN) 0-87169-724-6.
- Hartmann, Ludo M. (June 1971). Untersuchungen zur Geschichte der byzantinischen Verwaltung in Italien (540-750). Research & Source Works Series No. 86 (in German). New York: Burt Franklin. ISBN 978-0-8337-1584-5.
- Herrin, Judith (2020). Ravenna: Capital of Empire, Crucible of Europe. Princeton, New Jersey: Princeton University Press. ISBN 978-0-691-20422-2.
- Hodgkin, Thomas. 553-600 The Lombard Invasion. Italy and Her Invaders, Vol. 5, Book VI (Replica ed.). Boston: Elibron Classics.
- John of Biclaro. Chronicle.
- Meyendorff, John (1989). Imperial unity and Christian divisions: The Church 450-680 A.D. Crestwood, NY: St. Vladimir's Seminary Press. ISBN 978-0-88141-055-6.
- Moffatt, Ann (2017). "The Orient Express: Abbot John's Rapid trip from Constantinople to Ravenna c. AD 700". In Brown, Amelia Robertson; Neil, Bronwen (eds.). Byzantine Culture in Translation. Brill. pp. 55–72. ISBN 9789004349070.
- Noble, Thomas F. X. (1984). The Republic of St. Peter: The Birth of the Papal State, 680–825. Philadelphia, Pennsylvania: University of Pennsylvania Press. ISBN 0-8122-1239-8.
- Norwich, John J. (1982). A History of Venice. New York: Knopf. ISBN 978-0-394-52410-8.
- Ostrogorsky, George (1956). History of the Byzantine State. Oxford: Basil Blackwell.
- Peters, Edward; Foulke, William D., eds. (2003) [1907]. Paul the Deacon: History of the Lombards. Philadelphia: University of Pennsylvania Press. ISBN 0-8122-1079-4.
- Raccagni, Gianluca (2010). "A Byzantine Title in a Post-Byzantine world: Local Aspirations and the Theory of translatio imperii in the Use of the Exarchal Title by the Archbishops of Ravenna through the Middle Ages". Mediterranean Historical Review. 25: 133–146. doi:10.1080/09518967.2010.536672.
- Shlosser, Franziska E. (2003). "The Exarchates of Africa and Italy". Jahrbuch der Österreichischen Byzantinistik. 53: 27–45. Archived from the original on 19 June 2025.
- West-Harling, Veronica (2020). Rome, Ravenna, and Venice, 750-1000: Byzantine Heritage, Imperial Present, and the Construction of City Identity. Oxford: Oxford University Press. ISBN 978-0-19-875420-6.
- Wickham, Chris (1981). Early Medieval Italy: Central Power and Local Society, 400-1000. Totowa, NJ: Barnes & Noble. ISBN 978-0-389-20217-2.
- Wozniak, Frank E. (1981). "East Rome, Ravenna and Western Illyricum: 454-536 A.D." Historia: Zeitschrift für Alte Geschichte. 30 (3): 351–382.
