= 1831 =

1831 in various calendars
- Gregorian calendar: 1831; MDCCCXXXI
- Ab urbe condita: 2584
- Armenian calendar: 1280; ԹՎ ՌՄՁ
- Assyrian calendar: 6581
- Balinese saka calendar: 1752–1753
- Bengali calendar: 1237–1238
- Berber calendar: 2781
- British Regnal year: 1 Will. 4 – 2 Will. 4
- Buddhist calendar: 2375
- Burmese calendar: 1193
- Byzantine calendar: 7339–7340
- Chinese calendar: 庚寅年 (Metal Tiger); 4528 or 4321 — to — 辛卯年 (Metal Rabbit); 4529 or 4322
- Coptic calendar: 1547–1548
- Discordian calendar: 2997
- Ethiopian calendar: 1823–1824
- Hebrew calendar: 5591–5592
- Hindu calendars
- Vikram Samvat: 1887–1888
- Shaka Samvat: 1752–1753
- Kali Yuga: 4931–4932
- Holocene calendar: 11831
- Igbo calendar: 831–832
- Iranian calendar: 1209–1210
- Islamic calendar: 1246–1247
- Japanese calendar: Tenpō 2 (天保２年)
- Javanese calendar: 1758–1759
- Julian calendar: Gregorian minus 12 days
- Korean calendar: 4164
- Minguo calendar: 81 before ROC 民前81年
- Nanakshahi calendar: 363
- Thai solar calendar: 2373–2374
- Tibetan calendar: ལྕགས་ཕོ་སྟག་ལོ་ (male Iron-Tiger); 1957 or 1576 or 804 — to — ལྕགས་མོ་ཡོས་ལོ་ (female Iron-Hare); 1958 or 1577 or 805

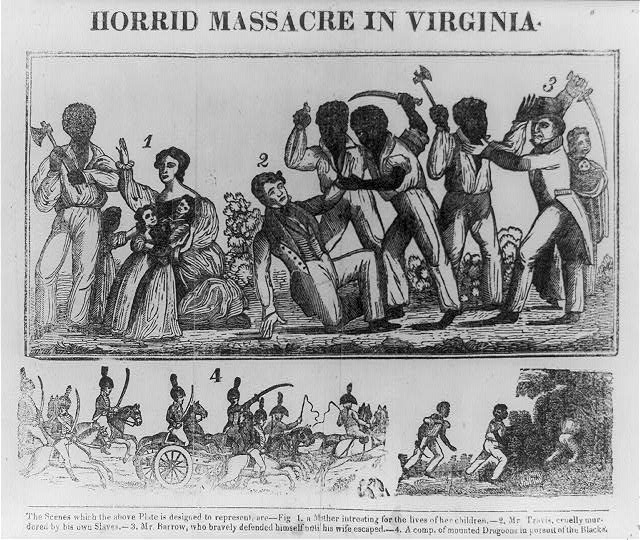
August 21: Nat Turner leads two-month rebellion of slaves in the U.S. state of Virginia.

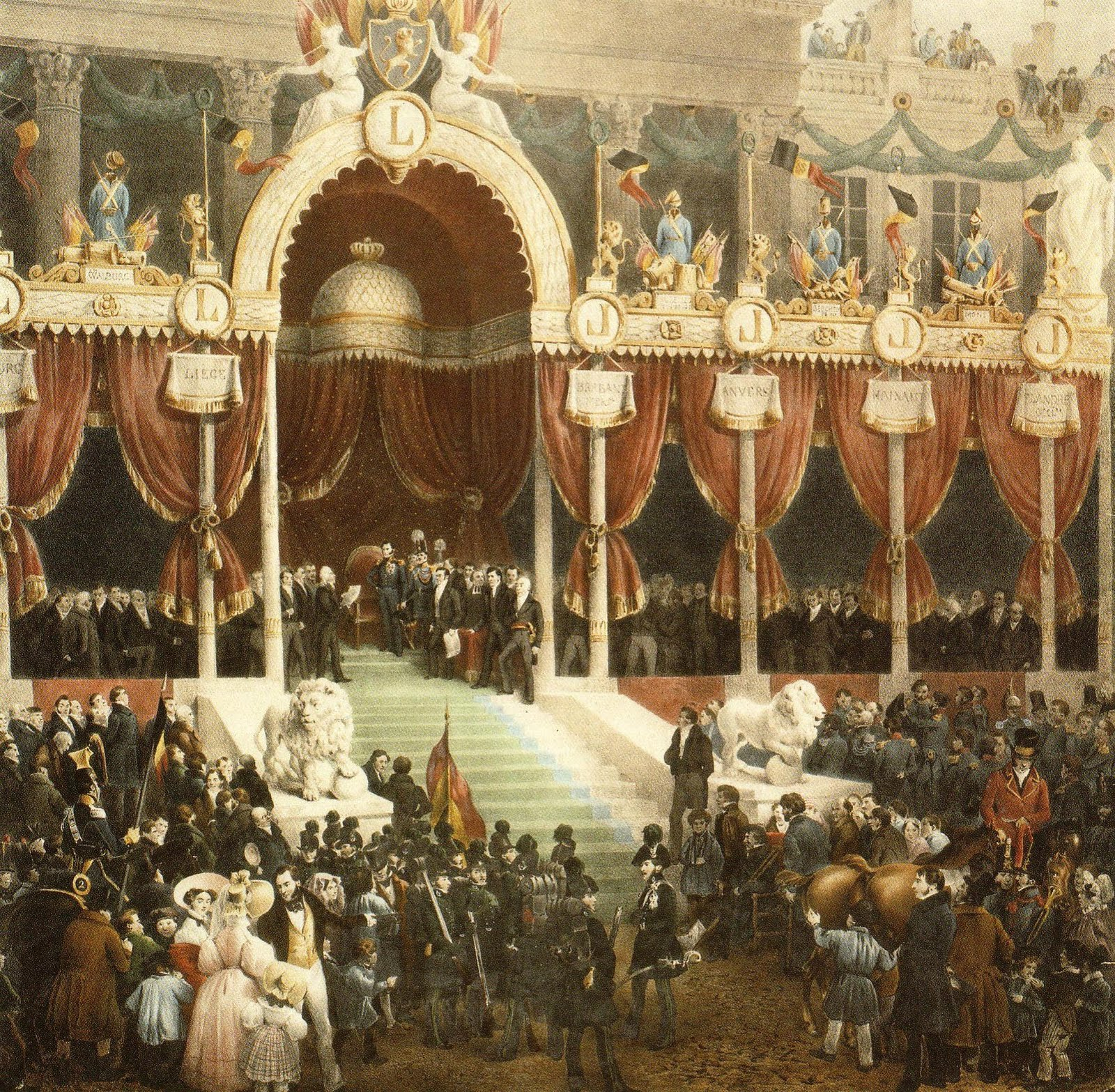
July 21: King Leopold I takes constitutional oath rather than holding a coronation to become the first King of Belgium.

1831 (MDCCCXXXI) was a common year starting on Saturday of the Gregorian calendar and a common year starting on Thursday of the Julian calendar, the 1831st year of the Common Era (CE) and Anno Domini (AD) designations, the 831st year of the 2nd millennium, the 31st year of the 19th century, and the 2nd year of the 1830s decade. As of the start of 1831, the Gregorian calendar was 12 days ahead of the Julian calendar, which remained in localized use until 1923.

== Events ==
=== January–March ===
- January 1 – William Lloyd Garrison begins publishing The Liberator, an anti-slavery newspaper, in Boston, Massachusetts.
- January 10 – Japanese department store, Takashimaya in Kyoto established.
- February–March – Revolts in Modena, Parma and the Papal States are put down by Austrian troops.
- February 2 – Pope Gregory XVI succeeds Pope Pius VIII, as the 254th pope.
- February 5 – Dutch naval lieutenant Jan van Speyk blows up his own gunboat in Antwerp rather than strike his colours on the demand of supporters of the Belgian Revolution.
- February 7 – The Belgian Constitution of 1831 is approved by the National Congress.
- February 8 – French-born botanical explorer Aimé Bonpland leaves Paraguay for Argentina.
- February 14 – Battle of Debre Abbay: Ras Marye of Yejju marches into Tigray, and defeats and kills the warlord Sabagadis.
- February 25 – Battle of Olszynka Grochowska (Grochów): Polish rebel forces divide a Russian army.
- March 10 – The French Foreign Legion is founded.
- March 16 – Victor Hugo's historical romantic Gothic novel Notre-Dame de Paris, known in English as The Hunchback of Notre-Dame, is published in Paris.
- March 29 – The Bosnian uprising (1831–32) against the Ottoman Empire begins.

=== April–June ===
- April 7 – Pedro I abdicates as Emperor of Brazil in favor of his 5-year-old son Pedro II, who will reign for almost 59 years.
- April 18
  - The University of Alabama is founded.
  - The Sydney Morning Herald newspaper is first published, as the Sydney Herald.
- April 27
  - Charles Albert becomes king of Sardinia after the death of King Charles Felix.
  - Ending of the First Anglo-Ashanti War (1823–1831).
- May 26 – Battle of Ostrołęka: The Poles fight another indecisive battle.
- May 31 – Auxiliary paddle steamer Sophia Jane arrives at Sydney from London, becoming the first steamboat to operate in the coastal waters of New South Wales.
- May–June – Merthyr Rising: Coal miners and others riot in Merthyr Tydfil, Wales, for improved working conditions.
- June 1 – British Royal Navy officer James Clark Ross locates the position of the North Magnetic Pole, at this time on the Boothia Peninsula.
- June 21 – The North Carolina State House and Canova's George Washington are destroyed by fire in Raleigh, North Carolina.

=== July–September ===
- July 13 – Russian imperial officials in Wallachia adopt Regulamentul Organic, introducing a period of unprecedented reforms that provide for Westernization of this region of Romania.
- July 15 – The volcanic Graham Island briefly emerges in the Mediterranean.
- July 21 – Leopold of Saxe-Coburg-Gotha is inaugurated as the first King of the Belgians, in Brussels.
- August 2 – The Dutch Ten Days' Campaign against Belgium is halted by a French army.
- August 7 – American Baptist minister William Miller preaches his first sermon on the Second Advent of Christ in Dresden, New York, launching the Advent Movement in the United States.
- August 21 - Nat Turner's slave rebellion in the United States breaks out in Southampton County, Virginia.
- August 29 - Michael Faraday demonstrates electromagnetic induction at the Royal Society of London. Joseph Henry recognises it at about the same time.
- September 8– Battle of Warsaw: The Army of Russia takes the Polish capital after a two-day battle to crush the Polish uprising.
- September 8 – Coronation of King William IV of the United Kingdom (he will reign until 1837).
- September 22 – The House of Commons of the United Kingdom passes the Great Reform Bill to expand the franchise, but this is later defeated in the House of Lords.
- September 28– The first national presidential nominating convention in the United States concludes after three days as the Anti-Masonic Party selects its nominee for president in Baltimore, Maryland.

=== October–December ===
- October 9 – Ioannis Kapodistrias, Greek head of state and founder of Greek independence, is assassinated in Nafplion.
- October 21 – The November Uprising ends in the defeat of Polish forces.
- October 28 – Michael Faraday constructs an early form of dynamo.
- October 29 – The 1831 Bristol riots ("Queen Square riots") in Bristol (England) begin, in connection with the Great Reform Bill controversy. Quelled by the authorities and the military on October 31, 100 city centre properties are destroyed, at least 120 are estimated to have been killed, 31 of the rioters will be sentenced to death and a colonel facing court-martial for failure to control the riot commits suicide.
- October 30 – In Southampton County, Virginia, escaped slave Nat Turner is captured and arrested for leading the bloodiest slave rebellion in United States history.
- November 7 – Slave trading is forbidden in Brazil.
- November 8 – The Kings School (Parramatta) was approved to be established.
- November 17 – Ecuador and Venezuela are separated from Gran Colombia.
- November 22 – First Canut Revolt: After a bloody battle with the military causing 600 deaths, rebellious silk workers seize Lyon, France.
- November 26 – Egyptian–Ottoman War (1831–1833): The start of the one year Siege of Akka by Egyptian forces.
- December 26 – Global financial services business Assicurazioni Generali is founded in Trieste (at this time in the Austrian Empire) as Imperial Regia Privilegiata Compagnia di Assicurazioni Generali Austro-Italiche.
- December 27
  - The Baptist War (Christmas Rebellion) begins in Jamaica, with the setting afire of the Kensington House in St James Parish, inspiring thousands of black slaves to revolt against their British masters. At its peak, more than 20,000 people will be involved, and more than 500 killed.
  - Charles Darwin embarks from Plymouth on the second voyage of HMS Beagle which will be the foundation for his life of scientific study.
- December 31 – Gramercy Park is deeded to New York City.

=== Date unknown ===
- Egyptian–Ottoman War (1831–1833): Egyptian forces under Muhammad Ali occupy Ottoman Syria.
- Scholar Rifa'a at-Tahtawi returns from study in Paris to Egypt, where he will participate in the Nahda.
- Founding of educational establishments:
  - Denison University in Granville, Ohio
  - New York University in New York City
  - Wesleyan University in Middletown, Connecticut
  - Xavier University in Cincinnati (as "The Athenaeum")
  - Wallinska skolan, the first secondary school for girls in the Swedish capital of Stockholm.

== Births ==
=== January–June ===
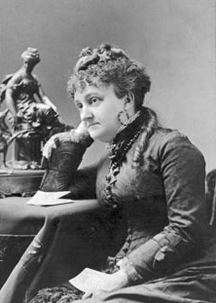
Myra Bradwell

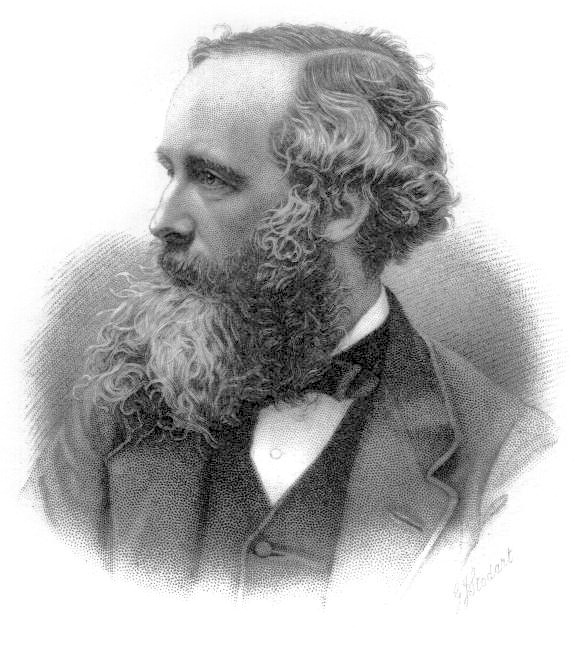
James Clerk Maxwell

- January 3 – Savitribai Jyotirao Phule, Indian social reformer, poet (d. 1897)
- January 7 – Heinrich von Stephan, German postal union organizer (d. 1897)
- January 11 – Pope Cyril V of Alexandria (d. 1927)
- January 26 – Heinrich Anton de Bary, German botanist, mycologist (d. 1888)
- February 12 – Myra Bradwell, American lawyer, political activist (d. 1894)
- February 24 – Leo von Caprivi, Chancellor of Germany (d. 1899)
- March 3
  - Gioacchino La Lomia, Italian Roman Catholic priest and venerable (d. 1905)
  - George Pullman, American inventor and industrialist (d. 1897)
- March 6
  - Philip Sheridan, American general (d. 1888)
  - Marguerite Tinayre, French educator, writer, socialist and political activist (d. 1895)
- March 12 – Clement Studebaker, American automobile pioneer (d. 1901)
- March 15 – Mariano Álvarez, Filipino general (d. 1924)
- March 16 – Elise Hwasser, Swedish actress (d. 1894)
- April 3 – Adelaide of Löwenstein-Wertheim-Rosenberg, Queen consort of Portugal (d. 1909)
- April 6 – Nire Kagenori, Japanese admiral (d. 1900)
- April 19 – Mary Louise Booth, American writer, editor and translator (d. 1889)
- May 7 – Richard Norman Shaw, British architect (d. 1912)
- June 1 – John Bell Hood, American Confederate general (d. 1879)
- June 2 – Jan Gerard Palm, Curaçao-born composer (d. 1906)
- June 7 – Amelia Edwards, English journalist and author (d. 1892)
- June 13 – James Clerk Maxwell, Scottish physicist (d. 1879)
- June 28 – Joseph Joachim, Austrian violinist (d. 1907)

=== July–December ===
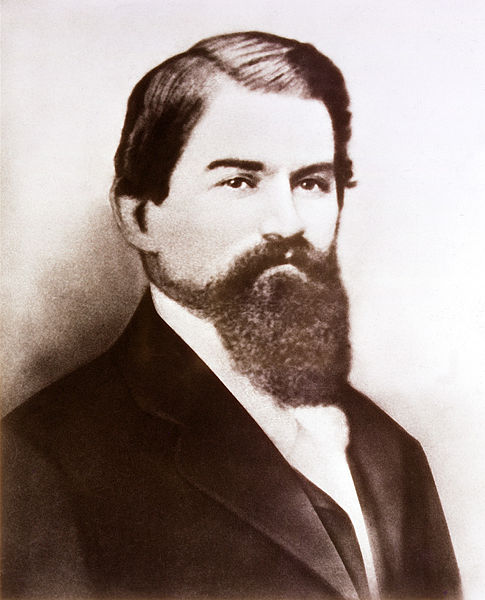
John Stith Pemberton

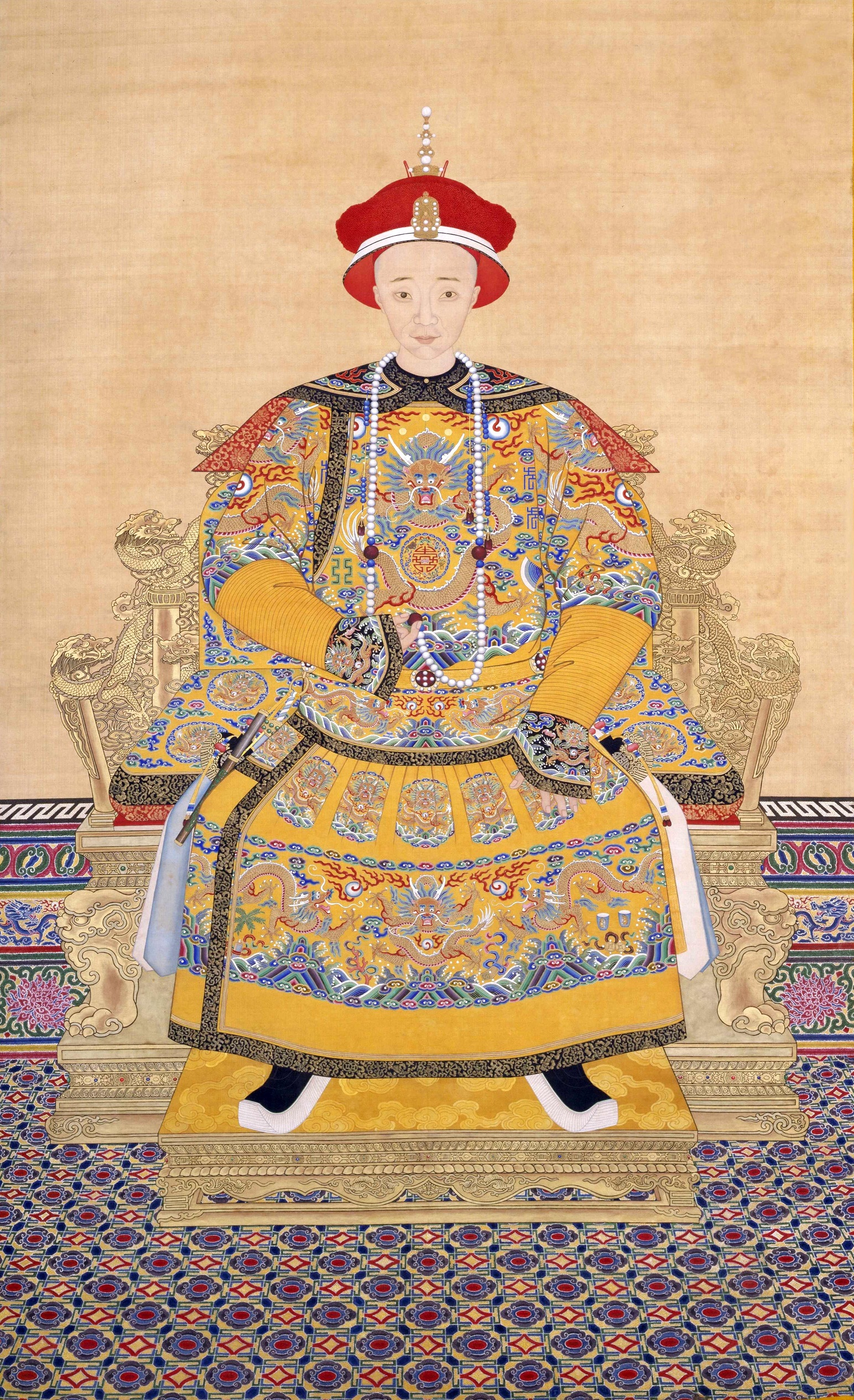
Xianfeng Emperor

Emperor Kōmei

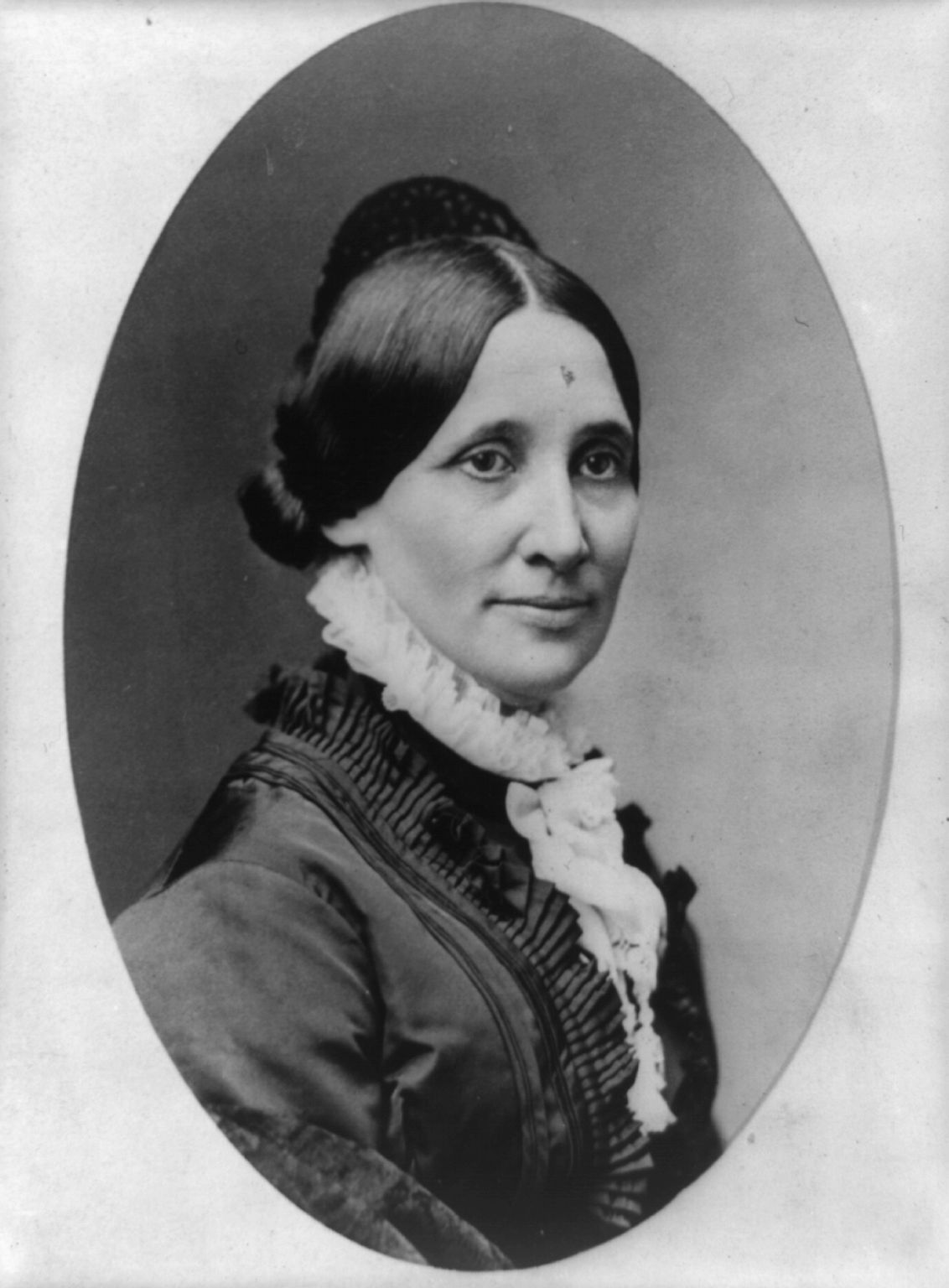
Lucy Hayes

- July 8 – John Stith Pemberton, American inventor of Coca-Cola (d. 1888)
- July 9 – Wilhelm His Sr., Swiss anatomist (d. 1904)
- July 17 – Xianfeng Emperor of China (d. 1861)
- July 22 – Emperor Kōmei of Japan (d. 1867)
- August 12 – Helena Blavatsky, Russian-born author, theosophist (d. 1891)
- August 16 – Ebenezer Cobb Morley, English sportsman and the father of modern football (d. 1924)
- August 20 – Eduard Suess, Austrian geologist (d. 1914)
- August 28 – Lucy Webb Hayes, First Lady of the United States (d. 1889)
- September 3 – States Rights Gist, Confederate Brigadier General in the American Civil War (d. 1864)
- September 8 – Wilhelm Raabe, German novelist (d. 1910)
- September 18 – Siegfried Marcus, German-born automobile pioneer (d. 1898)
- September 20 – Kate Harrington, American teacher, writer and poet (d. 1917)
- September 29 – John Schofield, American general (d. 1906)
- October 6 – Richard Dedekind, German mathematician (d. 1916)
- October 14 – Samuel W. Johnson, English railway mechanical engineer (d. 1912)
- October 16 – Lucy Stanton, American abolitionist (d. 1910)
- October 18 – Frederick III, German Emperor (d. 1888)
- October 18 - Robert Potter, author and minister (d. 1908)
- October 29 – Othniel Charles Marsh, American paleontologist (d. 1899)
- October 31
  - Paolo Mantegazza, Italian neurologist, physiologist, anthropologist and fiction writer (d. 1910)
  - Romualdo Pacheco, Governor of California (d. 1899)
- November 1 – Harry Atkinson, 10th Premier of New Zealand (d. 1892)
- November 5 – Anna Leonowens, Anglo-Indian educator (Anna of The King and I) (d. 1915)
- November 7 – Mélanie Calvat, French Roman Catholic nun, Marian Visionary, canonized (d. 1904)
- November 19 – James A. Garfield, 20th President of the United States (d. 1881)
- December 1 – Princess Maria Amélia of Brazil, daughter of Emperor Pedro I of Brazil (d. 1853)
- December 14 – Arsenio Martínez Campos, Spanish general, revolutionary and prime minister (d. 1900)
- December 19 – Bernice Pauahi Bishop, Hawaiian aliʻi (d. 1884)

=== Date unknown ===
- Richard Hawksworth Barnes, English coffee grower, naturalist and meteorologist (d. 1904)
- Jacob W. Davis, (b. Jacob Youphes), Latvian-born American tailor, inventor of jeans (d. 1908)
- Sotirios Sotiropoulos, Greek economist, politician (d. 1898)
- Eugenia Kisimova, Bulgarian feminist, philanthropist, women's rights activist (d. 1885)

== Deaths ==
=== January–June ===
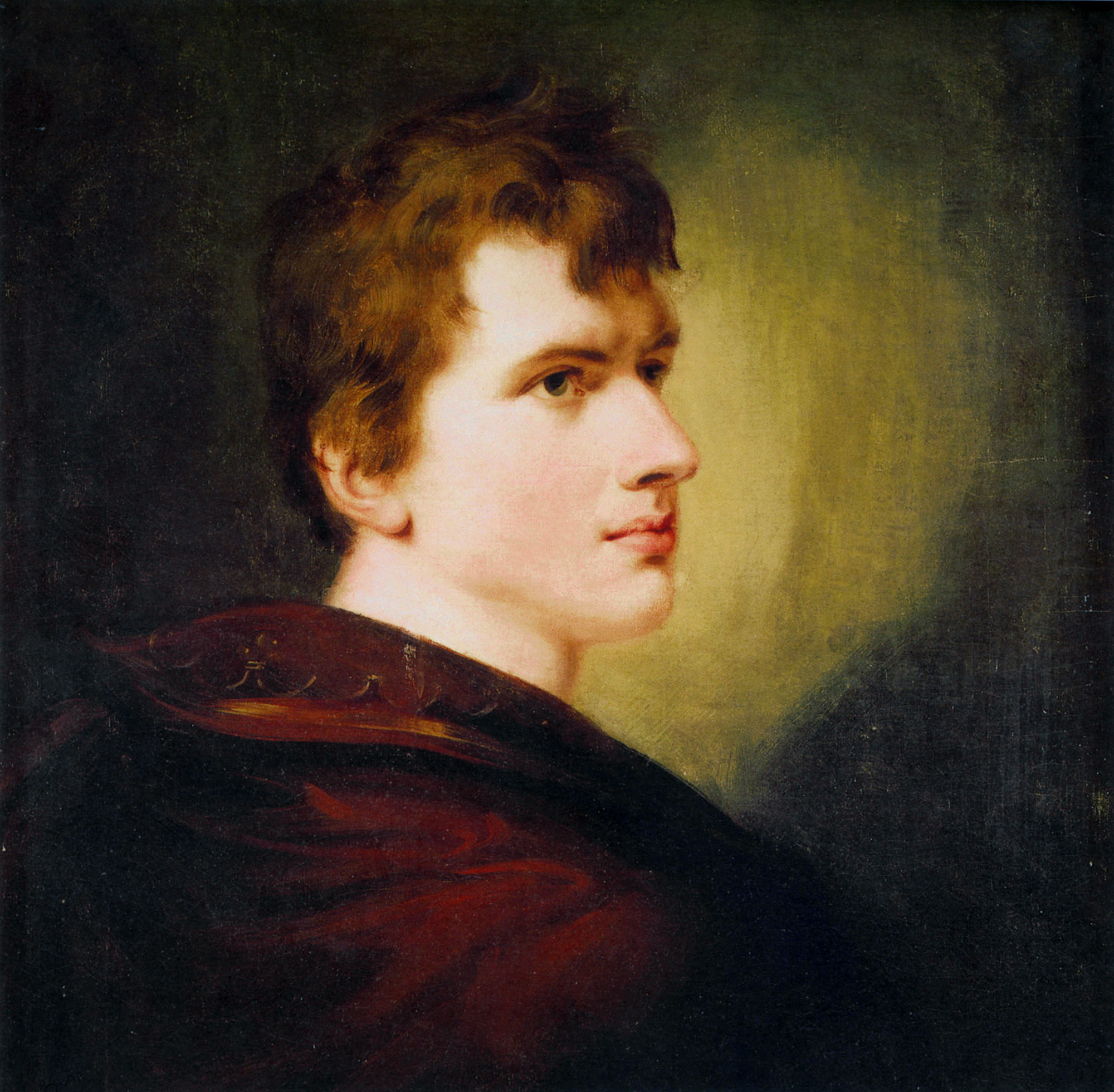
Ludwig Achim von Arnim

- January 8 – Franz Krommer, Czech composer (b. 1759)
- January 21 – Ludwig Achim von Arnim, German poet (b. 1781)
- February 2 – Vincenzo Dimech, Maltese sculptor (b. 1768)
- February 14
  - Vicente Guerrero, 2nd President of Mexico, Independence War hero (b. 1782)
  - Marye of Yejju, Ethiopian Ras
  - Sabagadis, Ethiopian warlord (b. c. 1770)
- February 17 – Friedrich Wilhelm, Duke of Schleswig-Holstein-Sonderburg-Glücksburg (b. 1785)
- March 9 – Friedrich Maximilian Klinger, German writer (b. 1752)
- April 5 – Dmitry Senyavin, Russian admiral (b. 1763)
- April 20 – John Abernethy, English surgeon (b. 1764)
- April 21 – Thursday October Christian I, Pitcairn Islander and son of Fletcher Christian (b. 1790)
- April 27 – Charles Felix of Sardinia, King of Sardinia (b. 1765)
- April 30 – Collet Barker, British military officer, explorer (b. 1784)
- May 17 – Nathaniel Rochester, American politician (b. 1752)
- June 5 – Tarenorerer, indigenous Australian Tasman freedom fighter (b. 1800)

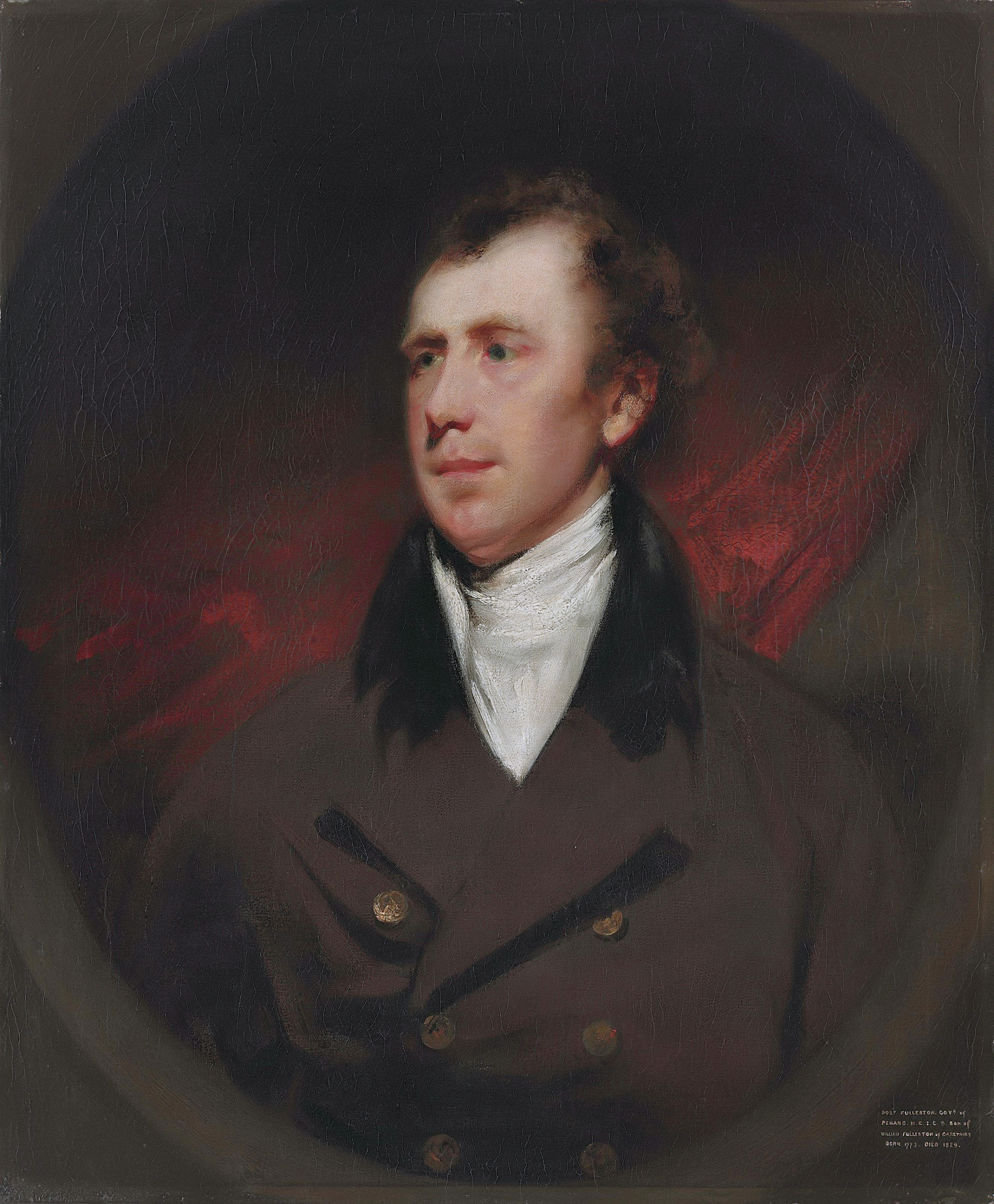
Robert Fullerton

- June 6 – Robert Fullerton, governor of Penang, first governor of British Straits Settlements (b. 1773)
- June 8 – Sarah Siddons, English actress (b. 1755)
- June 27 – Sophie Germain, French mathematician (b. 1776)
- June 30 – William Roscoe, English abolitionist and writer (b. 1753)

=== July–December ===
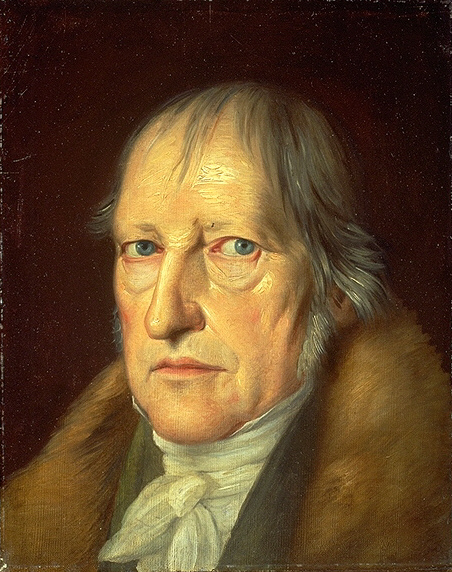
Georg Hegel

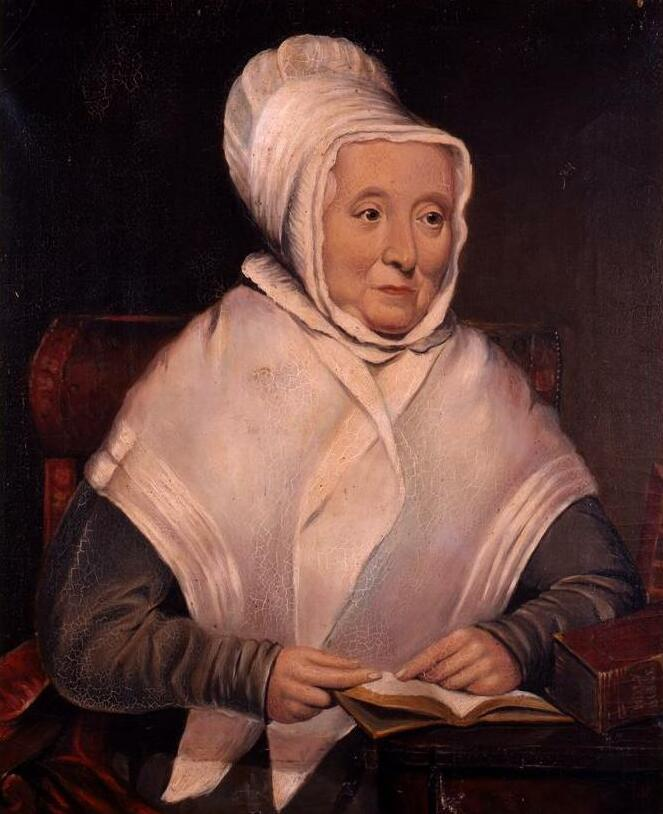
Hannah Adams

- July 4 – James Monroe, 73, 5th President of the United States (b. 1758)
- July 16 – Louis Alexandre Andrault de Langeron, Russian general (b. 1763)
- July 20 – Jacques Defermon des Chapelières, French politician (b. 1752)
- August 5 – Sébastien Érard, German-born French instrument maker (b. 1752)
- August 24 – August von Gneisenau, Prussian field marshal (b. 1760)
- September 28 – Philippine Engelhard, German writer, scholar (b. 1756)
- November 6 – Hilchen Sommerschild, Norwegian educator (b. 1756)
- November 11 – Nat Turner, American slave rebel (b. 1800)
- November 14 – Georg Hegel, German philosopher (b. 1770)
- November 16 – Carl von Clausewitz, German military strategist (b. 1780)
- November 19 – Titumir, Bengali revolutionary (b. 1782)
- November 21 – Marie Anne Simonis, Belgian textile industrialist (b. 1758)
- December 15 – Hannah Adams, American author (b. 1755)
- December 18 – Willem Bilderdijk, Dutch author (b. 1756)
- December 23 – Emilia Plater, Polish heroine (b. 1806)
- December 26
  - Henry Louis Vivian Derozio, Indian poet (b. 1809)
  - Stephen Girard, French-American banker (b. 1750)

=== Date unknown ===
- Marengo, Napoleon's mount in several battles (b. 1793)
- Charlotta Richardy, Swedish industrialist (b. 1751)
