= Mulu Gebreegziabher =

20th-century Tigrayan feminist and freedom fighter

- Born: 1962; Dibdibo, Enticho (woreda), Tigray Region, Ethiopia
- Died: 1982 (aged 19–20); Derg prison, Ethiopia
- Occupations: Political activist, feminist
- Political party: TPLF

Mulu Gebreegziabher (fighter's name Kashi Gebru; 1962 – 1982) was an Ethiopian feminist and freedom fighter. She is best remembered for testifying her anti-feudal and anti-patriarchal convictions in front of a camera held by Derg soldiers who had captured her. Later on she was assassinated by Derg.

== Lifeline ==
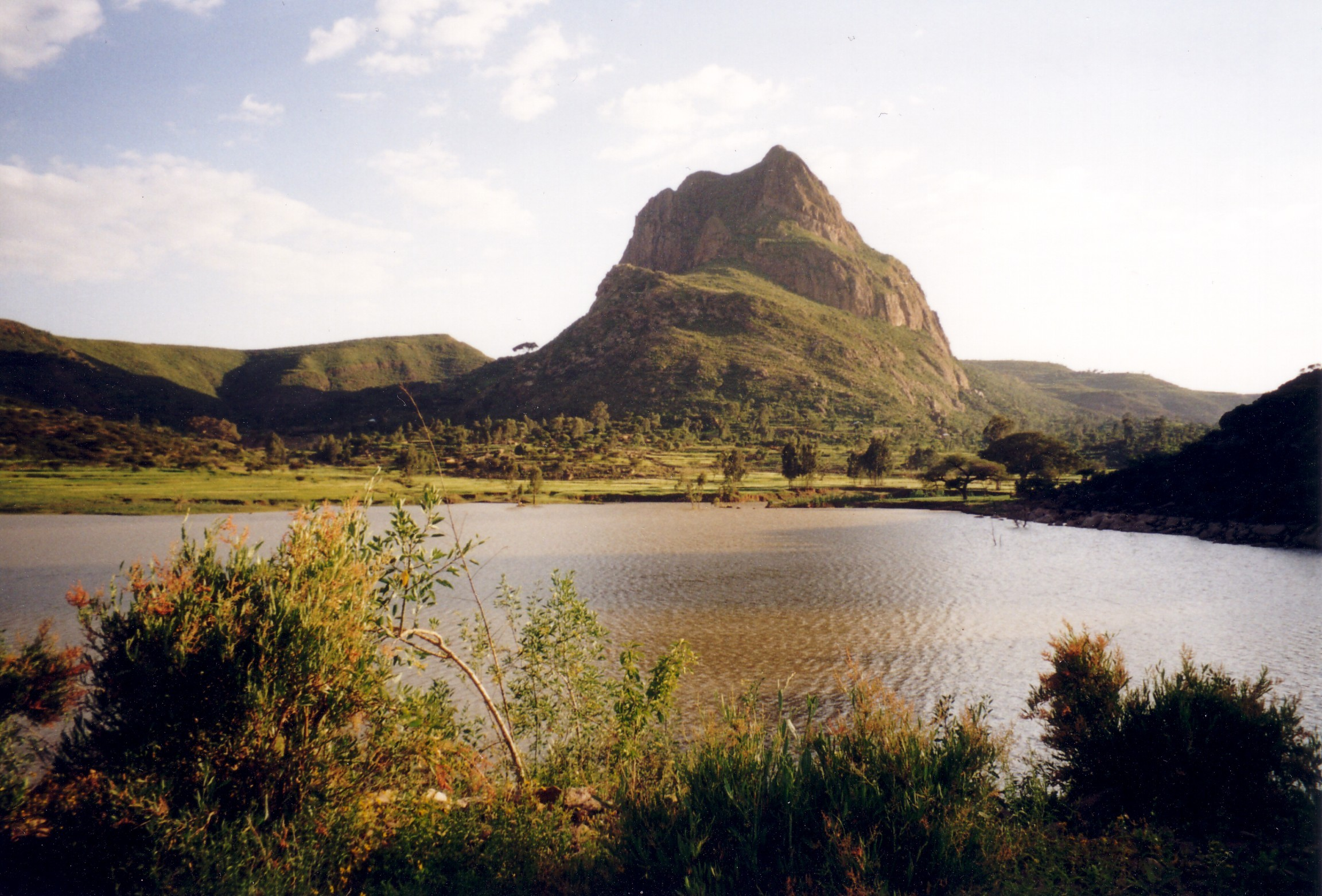
Dibdibo village, at the foot of the mountain

Mulu was born in a farmers’ household in Dibdibo, Enticho (woreda), Tigray Region, Ethiopia. In her teens she joined the TPLF guerilla that was fighting the then Derg regime in Ethiopia. Though without formal schooling, she rose rapidly in ranks and was a motivating speaker in political assemblies, focusing especially on the new society to be built where women and men would be equal, and land equitably shared among all. In 1982, she was captured by Derg and assassinated.

== Prisoner of Derg ==
While prisoner, she was interrogated by Derg soldiers, and the video tapes of this interrogation had been conserved. Mulu stared her interrogator in the eye and made her stand clear without fear. The interview she gave to Derg's TV defending the TPLF was remarkable, particularly for an illiterate person. She did not cooperate with Derg, though that could have saved her life; her main reason was to liberate Ethiopia from the military government. Shortly after the interview she was shot by Derg soldiers. She was only 20 years old.

== Commemoration ==
- A film was produced in 2012 about her life and political stands, by Ethiopian TV
- Her statue was erected in Mekelle
- Her statue was erected in Humera - it was demolished in 2020 by Amhara militia and Ethiopian army
- A song in the Tigrinya language has been dedicated to her
