= Enticho (woreda) =

Coordinates: 14°20′N 39°10′E

Enticho ኣሕፈሮም Ahferom, Inticho
- Woreda
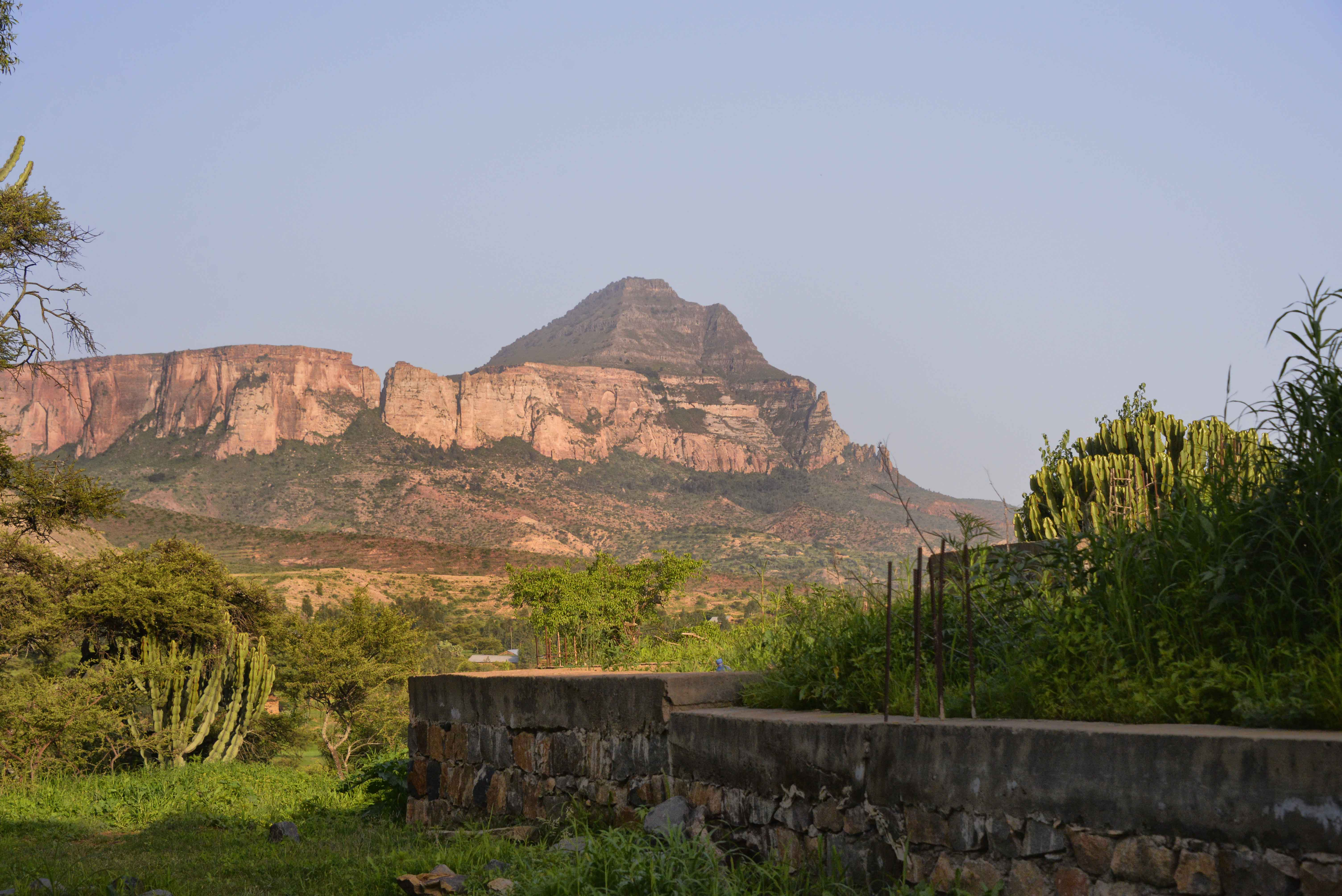

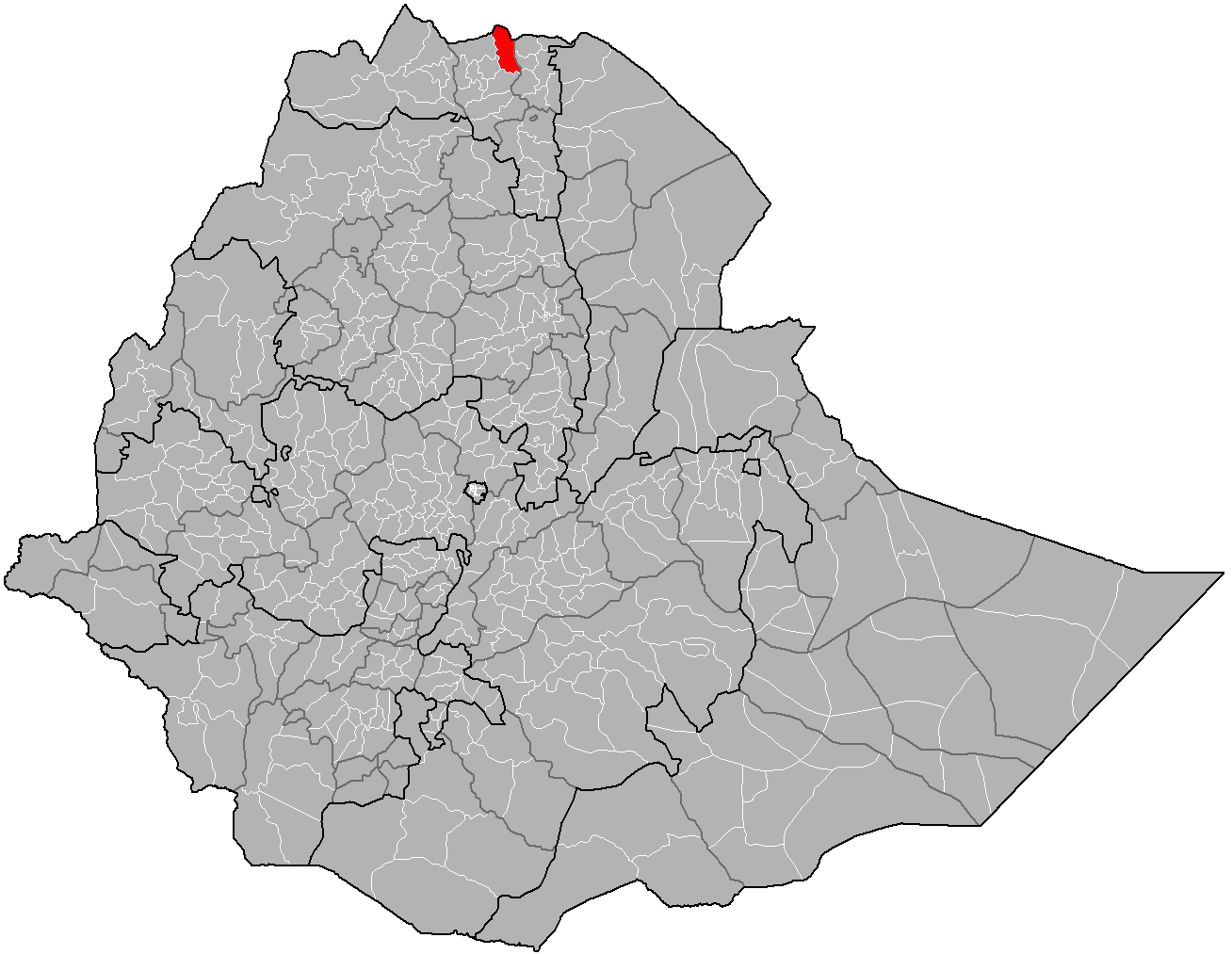
- Country: Ethiopia
- Region: Tigray
- Zone: Maekelay (Central)
- Administrative centre: Enticho

Area
  - Total: 5,367.84 km^{2} (2,072.53 sq mi)

Population (2020)
  - Total: 220,700

Enticho (Tigrinya: ኣሕፈሮም) (also known as Ahferom) is one of woredas in the Tigray Region of Ethiopia. Part of the Maekelay Zone, Enticho is bordered on the south by Werie Lehe, on the southwest by Adwa, on the west by Mereb Lehe, on the north by Eritrea, and on the east by the Misraqawi (Eastern) Zone. The administrative center of this woreda is Enticho; other towns in Enticho include Edaga Arbi, and Gerhusernay. Ancient monastery of Debre Damo is also located in Enticho.

Prominent high points in this woreda include Amba Senayt, which R.S. Whiteway identifies as the location of the Battle of Baçente, where Cristóvão da Gama in 1542 enjoyed his first victory over his Moslem foe. The battle of Battle of Addi Qarro against the Ottoman Empire followed an earlier Ethiopian victory at Enticaw on November 13 of the same year and resulted in the liquidation of the invading Ottoman army.

The reservoirs of the district include Belesat and Dibdibo, constructed by the Relief Society of Tigray in the 1990s.

== Demographics ==
Based on the 2007 national census conducted by the Central Statistical Agency of Ethiopia (CSA), this woreda has a total population of 173,700, an increase of 32.43% over the 1994 census, of whom 84,014 are men and 89,686 women; 23,421 or 13.48% are urban inhabitants. With an area of 2,367.84 square kilometers, Enticho has a population density of 73.36, which is greater than the Zone average of 56.29 persons per square kilometer. A total of 38,934 households were counted in this woreda, resulting in an average of 4.46 persons to a household, and 37,483 housing units. The majority of the inhabitants said they practiced Ethiopian Orthodox Christianity, with 97.76% reporting that as their religion, while 2.22% of the population were Muslim.

The 1994 national census reported a total population for this woreda of 105,814, of whom 51,871 were men and 53,943 were women; 12,375 or 11.7% of its population were urban dwellers. The two largest ethnic groups reported in Abergele were the Tigrayan (99.5%), and the Amhara (0.3%); all other ethnic groups made up 0.2% of the population. Tigrinya was spoken as a first language by 99.44%, and 0.44% spoke Amharic; the remaining 0.12% spoke all other primary languages reported. 99.32% of the population practiced Ethiopian Orthodox Christianity, and 0.41% were Muslim. Concerning education, 13.64% of the population were considered literate, which is less than the Zone average of 15.71%; 21.31% of children aged 7–12 were in primary school; 1.71% of the children aged 13–14 were in junior secondary school; 2.62% of the inhabitants aged 15–18 were in senior secondary school. Concerning sanitary conditions, about 90% of the urban houses and 29% of all houses had access to safe drinking water at the time of the census; 29% of the urban and 6% of the total had toilet facilities.

== Agriculture ==
A sample enumeration performed by the CSA in 2001 interviewed 34,455 farmers in this woreda, who held an average of 0.67 hectares of land. An origin to GESHO. Of the 23,196 hectares of private land surveyed, 85.86% was in cultivation, 0.85% pasture, 8.32% fallow, 0.62% woodland, and 4.35% was devoted to other uses. For the land under cultivation in this woreda, 72.68% was planted in cereals, 7.76% in pulses, and 0.48% in oilseeds; the amount in vegetables is missing. The area planted in fruit trees was 42 hectares, while the area planted in gesho is missing. 77.88% of the farmers both raised crops and livestock, while 22.12% only grew crops; the number who only raised livestock is missing. Land tenure in this woreda is distributed amongst 93.12% owning their land, 6.0% renting, and 0.88% holding their land under other forms of tenure is missing.

== 2020 woreda reorganisation ==
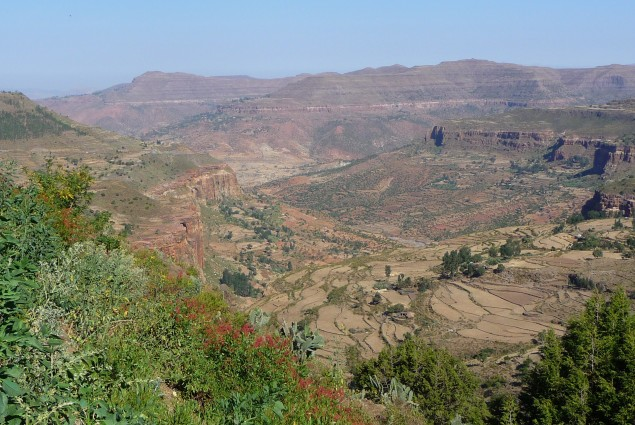
Mugulat near Bizet

In 2020, woreda Ahferom became inoperative and as of early 2020, its territory belongs to the following new woredas:

- Ahferom (new, smaller, woreda)
- Egela woreda
- Bizet woreda
- Inticho town

== Noteworthy People ==
- Kassa Gebreyohannes (Diplomat)
