= Relief Society of Tigray =

Charitable humanitarian organisation

Relief Society of Tigray ማሕበራዊ ረዲኤት ትግራይ
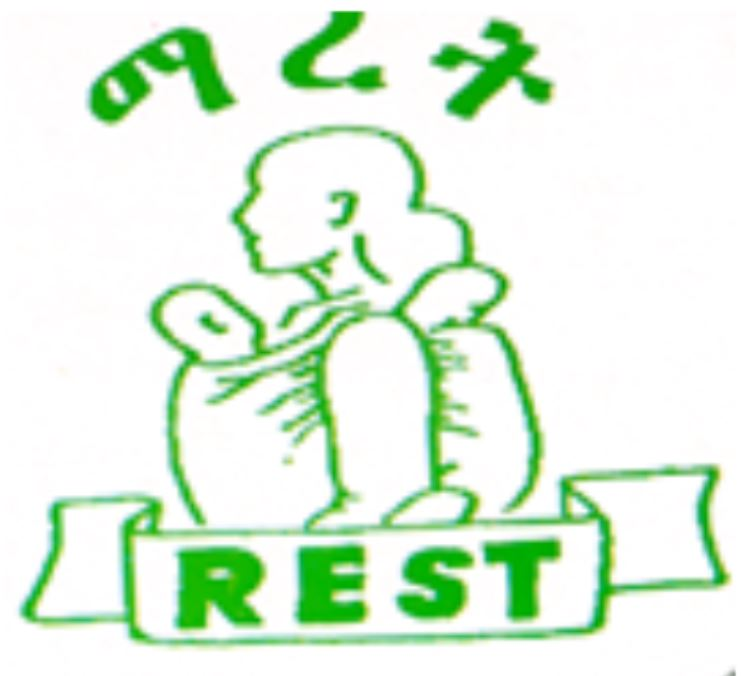
- Founded: 1 January 1978; 48 years ago
- Founded at: Tigray
- Type: NGO
- Purpose: "Transforming Lives and Livelihoods in Tigray, Northern Ethiopia"
- Headquarters: Mekelle, Tigray
- Region served: Tigray Region
- Executive Director: Teklewoini Assefa
- Employees: 1010 (in 2012)
- Managing director (2021): Heshe Lemma

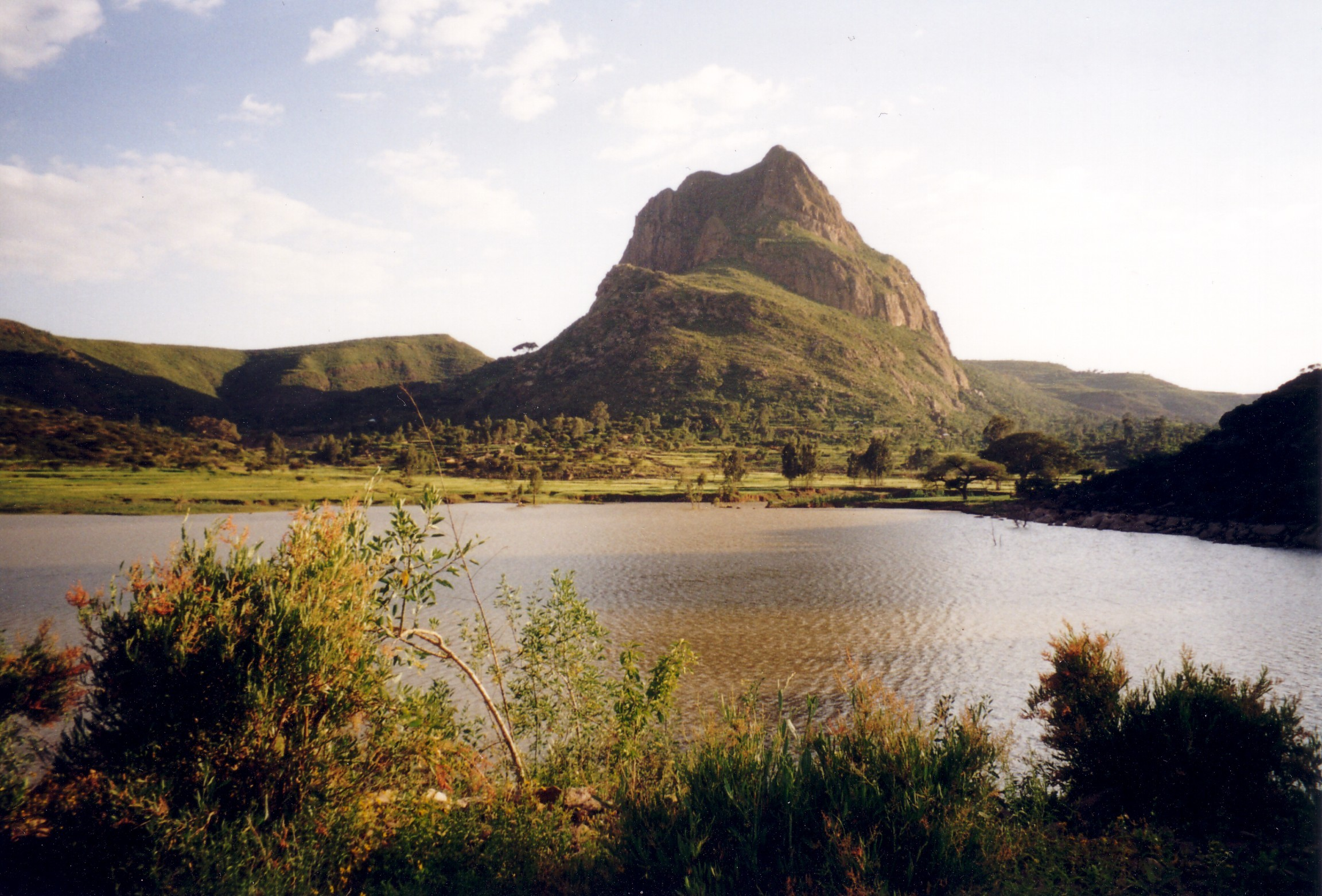
Dibdibo reservoir, constructed by REST

The Relief Society of Tigray (abbreviated REST; Tigrinya: ማሕበራዊ ረዲኤት ትግራይ or ማረት, Maret) is an NGO based in Tigray, northern Ethiopia. REST was founded in 1978 as an organisation providing relief efforts to civilians. As of 2008, Teklewoini Assefa served as Executive Director of REST. REST emerged as the humanitarian wing of the Tigray People's Liberation Front (TPLF) and has remained closely linked to TPLF. REST was active throughout the armed conflict of the 1980s, including during the devastating 1984–1985 famine. Since the 1990s it is the major NGO operating in Tigray.

== Emergence and civil war of the 1980s ==
Prior to the TPLF and Ethiopian People's Revolutionary Democratic Front (EPRDF) overthrowing the Derg government in 1991, REST worked in the areas under the control of the TPLF, operating over 60 schools and 53 clinics. The organization had a literacy programme, which claimed to have educated 405,834 persons in the period of 1981 to 1983. REST also sought to provide clean drinking water in these areas. Through TPLF resources from the Tigrayan diaspora in North America and Europe and different NGOs were channeled to Tigray. In 1981 the Emergency Relief Desk was set up in Khartoum, as a consortium of Scandinavian ecumenical NGOs cooperating with REST and the Eritrean Relief Association (the humanitarian wing of the EPLF). The ERD provided food supplies to the Sudanese border, where it was picked up by REST and ERA to be distributed in Tigray and Eritrea. In contrast Western governments avoided direct links with REST, continuing to channel aid efforts through the official mechanisms in cooperation with the Addis Ababa government.

=== Famine ===
REST played a crucial role to undercut the Addis Ababa government's attempts to use famine as a means to obtain control over Tigray. However, at the onset of the 1984–1985 famine REST suffered from logistical constraints. The organization had only 35 trucks, out of which many were in bad shape. Unable to cope with the humanitarian disaster, REST and TPLF decided to encourage Tigrayans to seek food at distribution centres operated by the Addis Ababa government. The policy of encouraging movements to government feeding centres was reversed, as abuses were committed in those places. Now, people were asked to migrate towards western Tigray and onwards to Sudan. Along the road REST organized distribution points for food, water and some degree of shelter. The organization also provided rudimentary medical services were available. Often REST would lead entire village groups into Sudan, were refugee camps were set up by the organization.

Through its work during the famine, REST gained recognition amongst international NGOs. It also managed to change the attitude of the Sudanese government towards the resistance movements in Ethiopia (allowing the TPLF to operate, whilst ending support to the Ethiopian Democratic Union).

=== Locusts ===
In the summer of 1987 Tigray was hit by a locust invasion, threatening crops. The organization lobbied, through its office in Khartoum, that the ICRC would send two helicopters to spray against locusts (an operation that eventually got the necessary go-ahead permission from the government in Addis Ababa). The locust problem again returned in 1988. REST also organized, along with TPLF, a volunteer force that would spray crops on the ground. A slogan was launched, "Fight the locusts with chemicals and the Derg with guns".

== Post 1991 ==
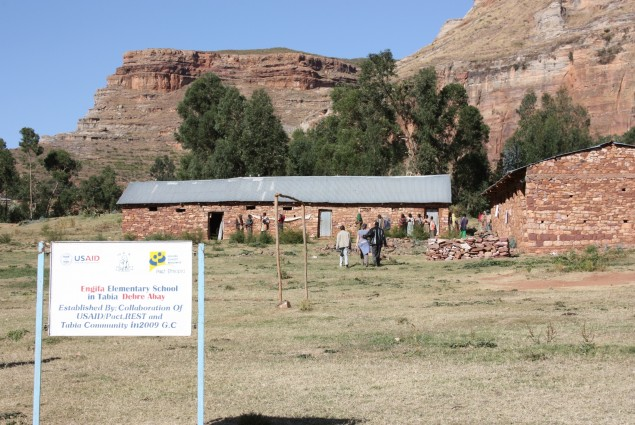
School constructed in Debre Abbay by REST in 2017

After the end of the war and the fall of the Derg, REST worked with refugee repatriations. The organization signed treaties with the Transitional Government of Ethiopia and UNHCR for these activities. REST provided humanitarian assistance for Tigrayan population during the 1998–2000 Ethiopian-Eritrean war.

A 1996 document, circulated amongst diplomatic circles in Addis Ababa, alleged that REST (along with other organizations) channeled funds to the governing Ethiopian People's Revolutionary Democratic Front.

In recent years, foreign government funding to REST has increased. As of 2008, the Norwegian Development Fund was the largest donor to REST. REST held its sixth General Assembly in 2008.

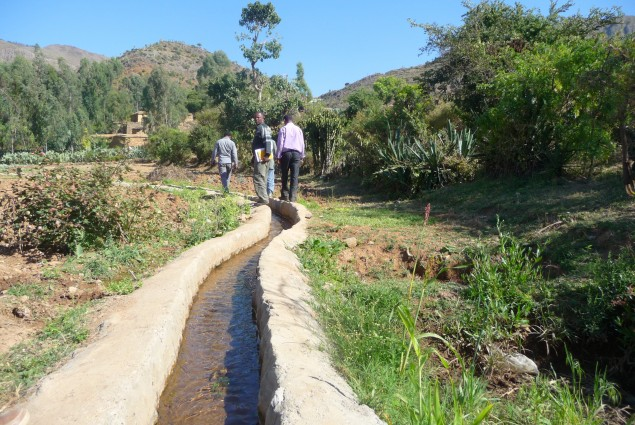
Awda Gwanda irrigation scheme, constructed by REST

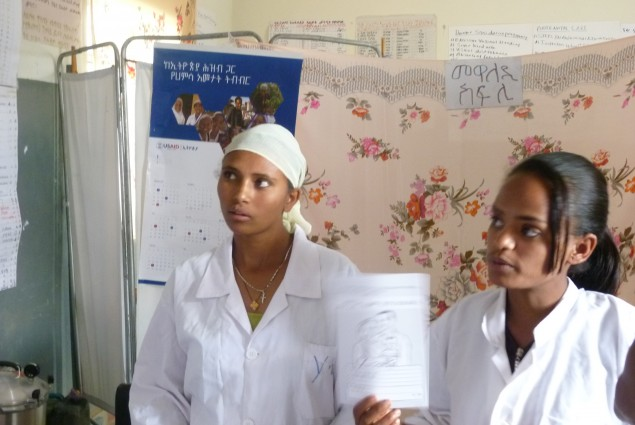
Health extension workers trained in Inticho

=== Activities in the decades of peace (1990–2020) ===
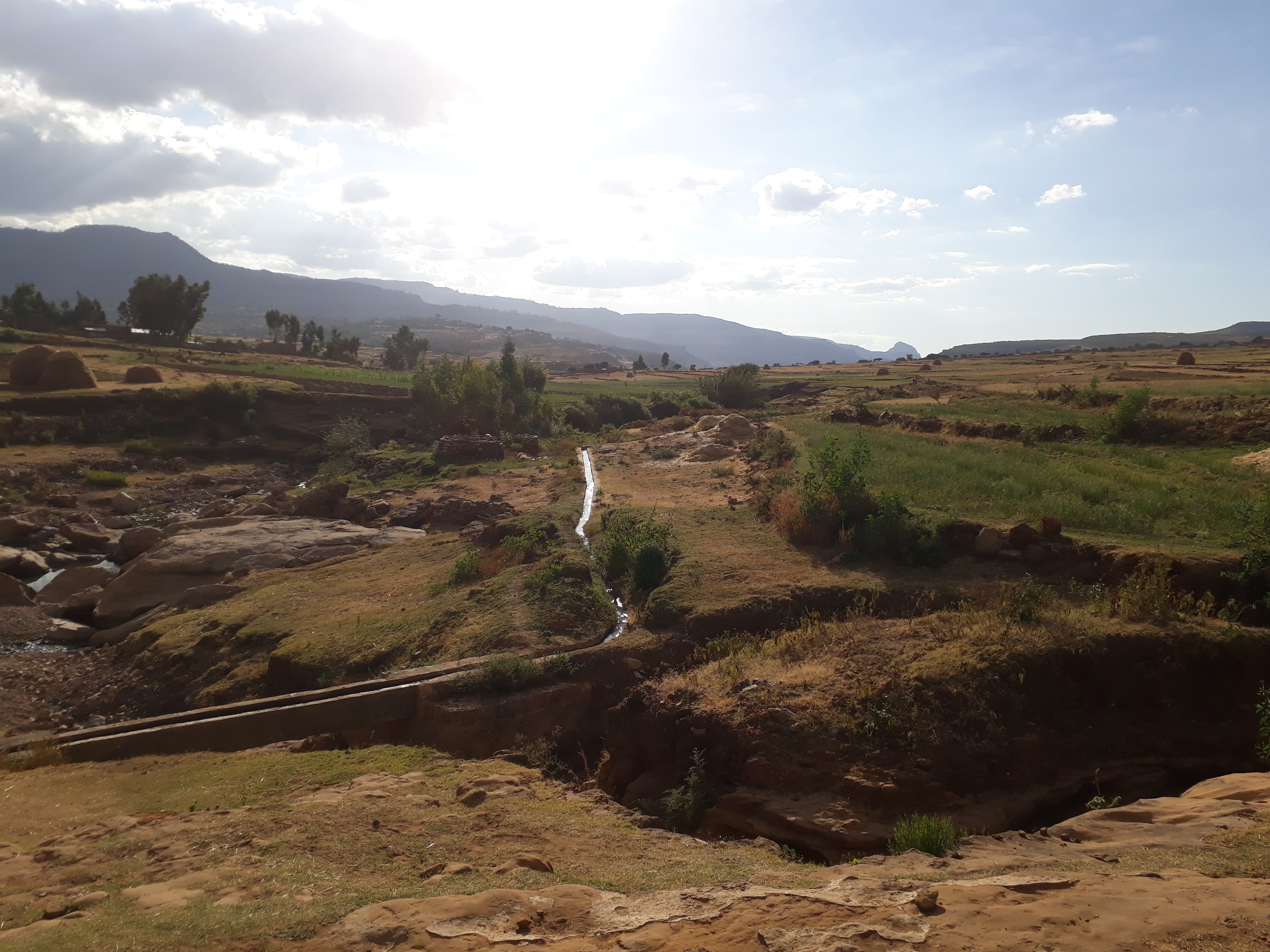
Ruba Weyni irrigation scheme, constructed by REST, and using seepage water from May Leiba reservoir

==== Guiding objectives ====
In 2012, REST had the following guiding objectives for its activities in the Tigray Region:

* to reduce current high levels of chronic household food insecurity
- to empower communities and most poor and vulnerable individuals
- to promote equity in development
- to promote the sustainable usage of renewable and non-renewable natural resources — REST, 2012 Annual Report,

==== Potable water ====
In numerous villages of Tigray, REST has established hand pumps, to provide the community with clean water. Each pump serves a few hundred people, and is managed by the community, who will appoint a guard, and a "water committee" that collects user fees and verifies cleanness. As a consequence, communities become more resilient to shocks and social interaction improves. The plight of women and girls, who traditionally care for water provisioning, is reduced. They spent less time, because less walking to distant springs, so that it is easier to attend school or do productive work. Just in 2012, REST has constructed 876 new hand dug wells, and provided clean water to 298,557 people in Tigray.

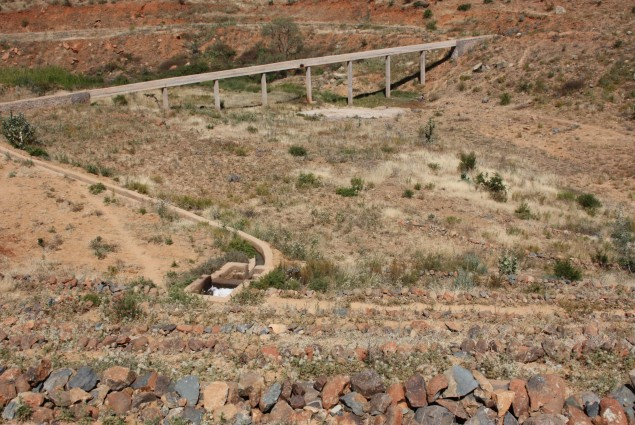
May Aqwi irrigation canals

Besides its involvement with the SAERT dam building programme, REST has also built several reservoirs such as

- Belesat
- Chini (reservoir)
- May Leiba
- Aqushela
- Dibdibo

==== Natural resources management ====
REST has continued and strongly enhanced the management of natural resources that was started in the civil war period of the 1980s. This includes the establishment of community managed exclosures, construction of soil and water conservation infrastructure, reclamation of gullies, all encompassed in global catchment management initiatives. As a consequence the baseflow in rivers improves, and the water can be used to establish irrigation schemes

- Exclosures established by REST have been demonstrate to enhance vegetation growth, rehabilitate the environment, control erosion and enhance infiltration.

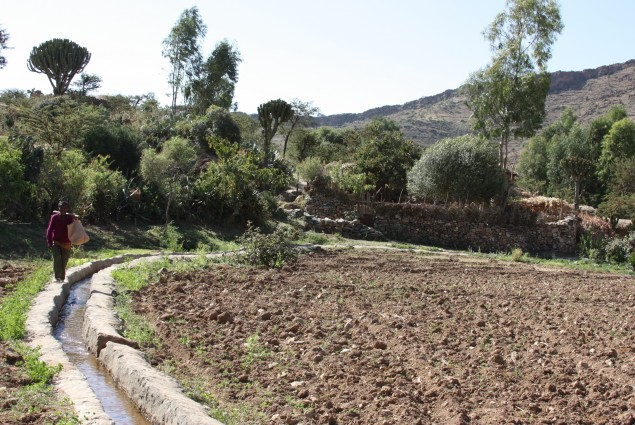
Irrigation at Awda-Gwanda

- Gully reclamation allows turning otherwise dry scars into "linear oases" with good vegetation and sometimes fruit trees. Runoff is slowed down also and no more erosion occurs.
- Terracing of agricultural land through stone bunds leads to more level land, with less erosion and better crop growth.

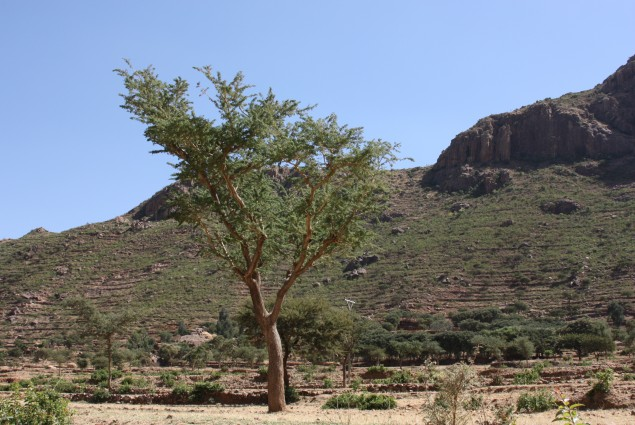
Terracing steep hillsides through PSNP

- Terracing of steep hillsides leads to ponding water and enhances infiltration, that will partly benefit vegetation regrowth and also raise the water table.

It has been demonstrated also that such land terraced by REST was able to absorb runoff coming in from upslope. In total, by 2012, REST had created 1733 km^{2} of exclosures.

==== Smallholder livelihoods ====
All the abovementioned initiatives contribute to the livelihoods of smallholder farmers. In addition, REST supports the creation of marketing groups of agricultural produce such as honey or milk. For instance, in 2012, newly created cooperatives benefited to 23,429 farmers.

==== Empowerment ====
Through its activities and by targeted capacity building, REST contributes to empowering women, farmers, and overall the rural households.

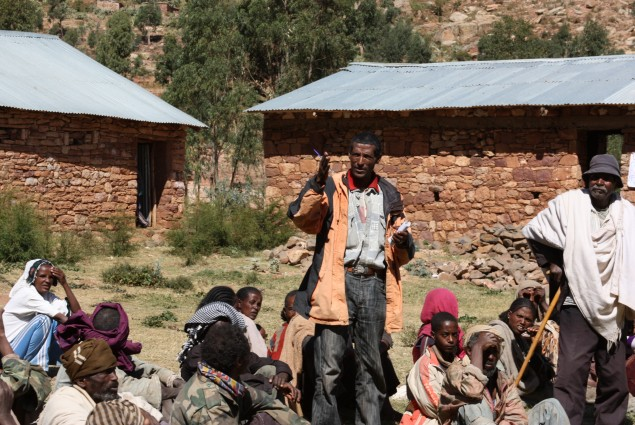
Community discussion in Debre Abbay

==== Health and education ====
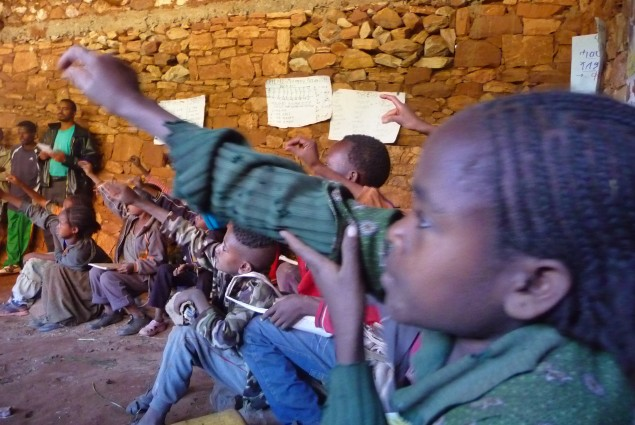
Grade-three students at Debre Abbay school

REST promotes community health by organising health training and nutrition promotion services. In 2012 this benefited to 17,380 child and adult students.

==== Social protection ====
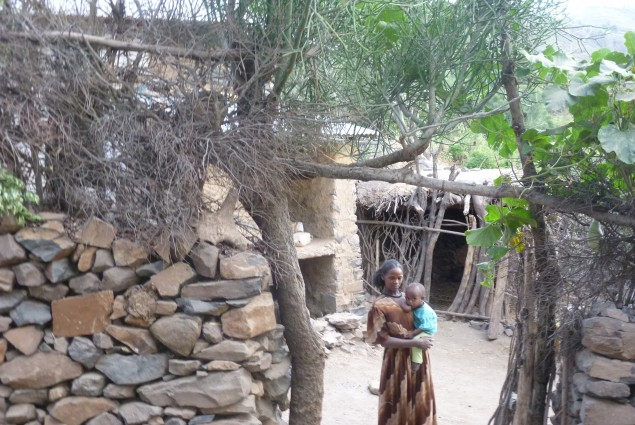
REST helps farmers in improving their homestead facilities

REST is strongly involved in the Productive Safety Net Programme, the major social protection programme in Africa. The poorest people get food aid, through their participation in rehabilitation and other community work. Though the PSNP has sometimes been criticised for politicisation and unfair selection of beneficiaries, overall it has been demonstrated that aid provided through PSNP was reaching the poorest of the poor. In 2012, REST reached over 860,000 people in need through the Productive Safety Net Programme.

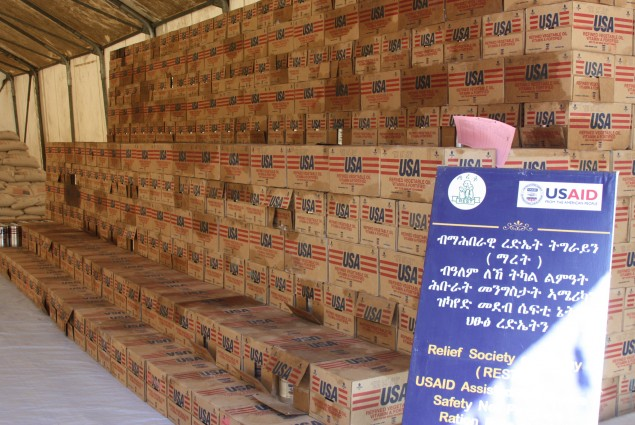
REST distributes food aid, received under the Productive Safety Net Programme (PSNP)

=== During the Tigray war: from development work to humanitarian aid ===
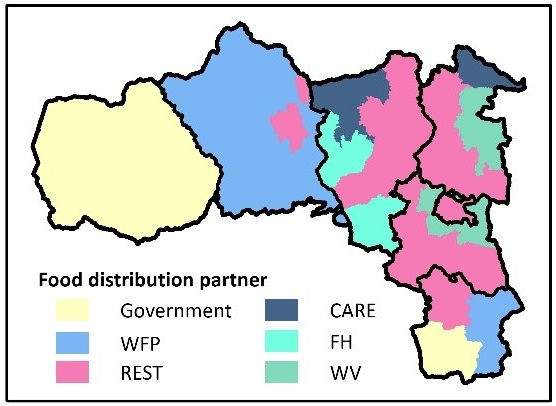
Food distribution partners in Tigray on 31 May 2021

During the Tigray War, one of the big problems to distribute aid was the absence of structures to reach out the needy. Before the war the Relief Society of Tigray (REST) was the main organised institution for this, but REST was having a lot of problems during the occupation by ENDF, EDF and fanno militias. REST's board members were replaced, with Amhara people dominating the board; REST's 33 warehouses in various woredas (with capacities of 700 – 1000 tons) have been destroyed; 11 offices have been looted; 70 trucks and vehicles have been looted; and other Tigray-based NGOs have been forced to defame REST. Despite all this USAID and CRF delivered aid through REST, aiming at reaching 1.3 million people.

During the conflict, the different humanitarian organizations (i.e. WFP, REST, WV, CARE, FH) have actively engaged in food distributions in different parts of the region. For instance, the Relief Society of Tigray reached more than 1 million people with food aid (in cooperation with USAID) per month in the first half of 2021.

In total, 2.2 million people were reached with food aid, distributed by REST (38%), WFP (37%), World Vision (WV; 12%), Food for the Hungry (FV; 8%) and CARE (5%).

== See also ==
- Dedebit Credit and Saving Institution SC
