= Dori of Yejju =

Ras of Begemder in the Ethiopian Empire

Dori of Yejju (died 1831) was a Ras of Begemder and Inderase (regent) of the Emperor of Ethiopia. He was the brother of his predecessor Marye of Yejju.

== Reign ==
After their brother Yimam's death Marye quickly seized the office of Ras, despite the armed resistance of Dori.

With his brother Dori led the Yejju forces in the Battle of Debre Abbay on 14 February 1831; his brother was killed in the savage battle, and as a result Dori had his followers ravage Tigray.

While he was with his followers pillaging the countryside outside of Axum, Ras Dori became ill. According to Samuel Gobat, not trusting his subordinates the Ras put half of them in chains, then returned to Debre Tabor where he died towards the end of May. His only significant act while Inderase was to depose Emperor Gigar on 18 June, and replace him with Iyasus IV.

== Notes ==
Preceded by Ras Marye	Chief of the Yejju	Succeeded by Ras Ali II
