= Dedebit =

Dedebit may refer to:

- Dedebit F.C.
- Dedebit (town)
  - Dedebit Elementary School airstrike
- Dedebit Credit and Saving Institution SC
