= Gebre Krestos =

Emperor of Ethiopia in 1832

Emperor of Ethiopia
- Reign: 24 March 1832 – 1832
- Predecessor: Iyasu IV
- Successor: Sahle Dengel
- Reign: 1832 – 8 June 1832
- Predecessor: Sahle Dengel
- Successor: Sahle Dengel
- Dynasty: House of Solomon
- Father: Gebre Mesay
- Religion: Ethiopian Orthodox Tewahedo

Gebre Krestos (Ge'ez: ገብረ ክሪስቶስ) (horse name Teuwos Rasa) was Emperor of Ethiopia from 24 March 1832 to his death on 8 June 1832. He was the son of Gebre Mesay, allegedly a descendant of a younger son of Emperor Fasilides.

== Reign ==
He was a figurehead, set on the throne by the Enderase or Regent, Ras Ali II an Oromo princeling of the district of Yejju; but shortly afterwards Ali II deposed Gebre Krestos in favor of his brother Sahle Dengel. The clergy of Azazo disapproved of Sahle Dengel for his religious beliefs, and they convinced Ras Ali to recall Gebre Krestos from exile on Mitraha, an island in Lake Tana, and restore him as Emperor. Gebre Krestos then reigned three months until his death; he was buried at the convent of Tekle Haymanot in Adababay. E.A. Wallis Budge reports that some authorities believe he was poisoned.

After an interregnum of a few months, the throne was once again held by his brother Sahle Dengel.

== Bibliography ==
Regnal titles
Preceded by Iyasu IV	Emperor of Ethiopia; 18 March 1832 – 1832	Succeeded by Sahle Dengel
Preceded by Sahle Dengel	Emperor of Ethiopia; 1832 – 8 June 1832	Succeeded by Sahle Dengel
