= King John of Ethiopia =

This could refer to:

- Yohannes I of Ethiopia (1640–1672)
- Yohannes II of Ethiopia (1699–1769)
- Yohannes III of Ethiopia (1797–1873)
- Yohannes IV of Ethiopia (1838-1889)
