= Sahle Dengel =

Emperor of Ethiopia intermittently between 1832 and 1855

Emperor of Ethiopia
- Reign: 1832
- Predecessor: Gebre Krestos
- Successor: Gebre Krestos
- Reign: 1832 – 29 August 1840
- Predecessor: Gebre Krestos
- Successor: Yohannes III
- Reign: October 1841 – 1845
- Predecessor: Yohannes III
- Successor: Yohannes III
- Reign: 1845–1850
- Predecessor: Yohannes III
- Successor: Yohannes III
- Reign: 1851 – 11 February 1855
- Predecessor: Yohannes III
- Successor: Tewodros II
- Born: 1778
- Died: 11 February 1855 (aged 76–77)
- Dynasty: House of Solomon
- Religion: Ethiopian Orthodox Tewahedo

Sahle Dengel (Ge'ez: ሣህለ ድንግል; 1778 – 11 February 1855) was Emperor of Ethiopia intermittently between 1832 and 11 February 1855, towards the end of the Zemene Mesafint. He was largely a figurehead, with real power in the hands of Ras Ali II of Yejju.

== Description ==
The French explorer Arnaud d'Abbadie, described him thus:

Sahala Dinguil, an old man of about seventy years, had a colored complexion almost as fair as that of a European, with frizzy white hair like snow, a high and smooth forehead, a lively eye, a full and beardless face; his whole person, a bit common, was imbued with a sensual joviality. He sat serenely on an Indian wooden bed, still bearing the remains of rich ivory and mother-of-pearl marquetry, a worn and too-narrow Turkish carpet left part of the floor uncovered.

== Biography ==
Sahle Dengel was the son of Gebre Mesay, allegedly a descendant of a younger son of Emperor Fasilides. Eduard Rüppell, who visited the capital of Gondar in 1833, stated that at the time the Emperor "barely had the income of an averagely well-to-do Ethiopian, and the great princes of the Tigray, Shewa and Amhara were unable to prevent continuous strife and bloodshed."

When Sahle Dengel was set on the throne by Ras Ali, the clergy of Azazo disapproved of his religious beliefs, and convinced Ras Ali to remove him; Sahle Dengel was sent to Zengaj. Ras Ali recalled Gebre Krestos from Mitraha, an island in northeastern Lake Tana, and restored him as Emperor. However, Gebre Krestos died after three months, and Sahle Dengel met Ras Ali in a village named Tagur, where he convinced the Ras to make him Emperor once again (October, 1832). About that same time, one Egwale Anbesa announced his claim to the throne; Sahle Dengel cut his head off, and set it in a tree at Adababay.

Following the death of Ras Kinfu, people fought for control of his lands in Gojjam. Eventually Menen Liben Amede gained the upper hand in the Battle of Chenti Ber (October, 1839), defeating and capturing Kinfu's relative Walda Tekle. Not long afterwards, she deposed Sahle Dengel on 29 August 1840 in favor of her husband Yohannes III. However Yohannes offended Ras Ali by favoring his rival Wube Haile Maryam, and Ras Ali restored Sahle Dengel in October 1841. Sahle Dengel was still emperor in 1848, when Goshu Zewde entered Gondar and was invested with the title of Ras. Yohannes somehow managed to get himself restored to the throne around 1850, only to be deposed again in 1851 and Sahle Dengel was once again restored. Despite this, Yohannes III persisted with his claim; different parts of the fragmented realm recognized one or the other as Emperor until Tewodros II consolidated Ethiopia under his control and declared himself Emperor. Significantly, Yohannes III accepted the accession of Tewodros II.

== International relations ==
Although without power, Sahle Dengel wrote to officials outside Ethiopia using his title and seal. Existing letters include a packet of letters sent to Samuel Gobat in April 1848, who had by that time become the Anglican Bishop of Jerusalem, which ask for his help in restoring the ownership of the Dar-es-Sultan monastery to the Ethiopian community. His name also appears as one of several signatories to a letter Antoine d'Abbadie delivered to Viscount Henry Palmerston 18 May 1839, which asked that Queen Victoria ask the ruler of Egypt, Muhammad Ali, to recall his forces which were then ravaging Ethiopia and threatening Gondar.

== Notes ==
Regnal titles
Preceded by Gebre Krestos	Emperor of Ethiopia; 1832	Succeeded by Gebre Krestos
Preceded by Gebre Krestos	Emperor of Ethiopia; 1832–1840	Succeeded by Yohannes III
Preceded by Yohannes III	Emperor of Ethiopia; 1841–1845	Succeeded by Yohannes III
Preceded by Yohannes III	Emperor of Ethiopia; 1845–1850	Succeeded by Yohannes III
Preceded by Yohannes III	Emperor of Ethiopia; 1851–1855	Succeeded by Tewodros II
