= Gigar =

Emperor of Ethiopia intermittently from 1821 and to 1830

Emperor of Ethiopia
- Reign: 3 June 1821 – April 1826
- Predecessor: Iyoas II
- Successor: Baeda Maryam III
- Reign: April 1826 – 14 February 1831
- Predecessor: Baeda Maryam III
- Successor: Iyasu IV
- Born: c. 1745
- Died: 26 November 1832 (aged 86–87)
- Dynasty: House of Solomon
- Religion: Ethiopian Orthodox Tewahedo

Gigar (Ge'ez: ጊጋር; c. 1745 – 26 November 1832) was Emperor of Ethiopia intermittently between 1821 and 1830, and purportedly a member of the Solomonic dynasty.

== Reign ==
According to Samuel Gobat, who met with Gigar (whom he called "Guigar") while a missionary in Ethiopia, Gigar had been a monk for many years, when on the death of his brother Iyoas II he was proclaimed Emperor. Although he "laid aside the cowl of St. Anthony, and assumed the crown and title of sovereignty," Gobat notes that "the first was much more becoming his character, and far more suitable to the energies of his mind." At the time Gobat met Gigar, the Emperor was said to be 86 years old, although Gobat thought that Gigar "did not appear to be more than sixty-five or seventy."

Gigar was largely a figurehead, made Emperor by Ras Marye of Begemder and chief of the Oromo. He was deposed by Dejazmach Haile Maryam, governor of Semien, in April 1826, who set Baeda Maryam III on the throne, but after a few days Ras Marye restored Gigar.

Gobat mentioned Gigar dwelled in a "small circular house, built by Joas, on the ruins of part of the palace". The emperor then gave Gobat a tour of the palace, which the missionary describes:

It must have been once a fine edifice, and although now in ruins, it is far superior to anything I had expected to see in Abyssinia. Three chambers or halls, and several smaller rooms, still remain in a tolerable state of preservation, though they have lain so long unoccupied that they present a very disagreeable appearance, being covered with dust and other impurities. The king occupies but a single room. This is decently furnished for this country, and divided by white curtains. After I had completed my examination of the mansion, he asked me if I had ever seen so superb an edifice. "Yes," said I, "I think I may have seen some in my own country that might bear a comparison with it." "What!" he exclaimed with surprise, "are there indeed men at the present day who are capable of executing such magnificent works?"

Gobat noted several signs of Gigar's ineffectual status, most notably his poverty: "he lives upon the contributions of the grandees of his dominions, who furnish him with whatever their generosity prompts them to bestow." Gobat had made a present of printed copies of an Amharic translation of the Gospels and Acts, which Emperor Gigar returned a few days later, explaining that "he had already had a considerable number of books, and would consequently much prefer that I should give him something that might be more serviceable to him – a little cloth, a piece of silk, or some other piece of merchandise."

After Marye was killed in battle against Sabagadis of Tigray in the Battle of Debre Abbay (14 February 1831), his successor and brother, Ras Dori, deposed Gigar. Gobat records in his journal that Gigar intrigued against his successor: "by false testimony" he accused Iyasu IV of inviting Ras Ali's rival, Aligas Faris, to depose the Enderase. "It is now said" Gobat wrote on 26 November 1832, "that the old king, Guigar, has procured his death by poison."

== Notes ==
Regnal titles
Preceded by Iyoas II	Emperor of Ethiopia; 1821–1826	Succeeded by Baeda Maryam III
Preceded by Baeda Maryam III	Emperor of Ethiopia; 1826–1830	Succeeded by Iyasu IV
