= Baeda Maryam III =

Emperor of Ethiopia in 1826

Emperor of Ethiopia
- Reign: April 1826
- Predecessor: Gigar
- Successor: Gigar
- Bida Maryam
- House: House of Solomon
- Religion: Ethiopian Orthodox Tewahedo

Baeda Maryam III, also known as Bida Maryam, was Emperor of Ethiopia for a few days in April 1826. Baeda Maryam was a figurehead, set on the throne by Dejazmach Haile Maryam, the governor of Semien. Elisabeth-Dorothea Hecht has argued that this Baeda Maryam is the same person as Baeda Maryam II, noting that the information that the earlier Baeda Maryam had died in combat in 1787 is wrong.

== Reign ==
According to the Royal chronicles of Abyssinia, Dajazmach Haile Maryam led a campaign south from Semien and held Mount Manta for 15 days to make Baeda Maryam emperor. When Ras Yimam cut short his expedition in Gojjam to oppose Dejazmach Haile Maryam, he found that the Dejazmach had seized control of the fords of the Abay River, so Ras Yimam circled west of Lake Tana through Dengel Ber to reach Dejazmach Haile Maryam in Dembiya. Surprised, Dejazmach Haile Maryam retreated to Weldebba where Ras Yimam with his brother Marye caught up with him and fought him for three days. On 6 January 1827, Dejazmach retreated again to Wegera and escaped from the brothers.

Baeda Maryam lived for several years after his deposition, as the missionary Samuel Gobat mentions that he met Baeda Maryam, his wife and children, in Adigrat in June 1831.

== Notes ==
Regnal titles
Preceded by Gigar	Emperor of Ethiopia; 1826	Succeeded by Gigar
