= Yohannes III =

Emperor of Ethiopia intermittently between 1840 and 1851

Emperor of Ethiopia
- Reign: 30 August 1840 – October 1841
- Predecessor: Iyasu IV
- Successor: Sahle Dengel
- Reign: 1845–1845
- Predecessor: Sahle Dengel
- Successor: Sahle Dengel
- Reign: 1850–1851
- Predecessor: Sahle Dengel
- Successor: Sahle Dengel
- Born: c. 1797
- Died: c. 1873 (aged 75–76)
- Spouse: Menen Liben Amede
- Dynasty: House of Solomon
- Father: Tekle Giyorgis I
- Religion: Ethiopian Orthodox Tewahedo; Roman Catholic (1851–1858)

Yohannes III (c. 1797 – c. 1873) was Emperor of Ethiopia intermittently between 1840 and 1851, and a member of Solomonic dynasty. He was the son of Tekle Giyorgis. He was largely a figurehead, with real power in the hands of the Enderase or Regent, Ras Ali II a princeling of the Yejju Dynasty. Ras Ali's mother was the Empress Menen Liben Amede.

== Life ==
During the various wars between Ras Ali and his leading rival for power, Dejazmach Wube Haile Maryam of Semien, Emperor Yohannes was deposed and restored several times between 30 August 1840 and 1851, alternating with his cousin Sahle Dengel. Yohannes was deposed the first time (October 1841) for showing himself a friend to Dejazmach Wube; he was restored briefly in 1845, then restored once again "by some unknown means" in 1850, according to E. A. Wallis Budge.

Budge portrays Yohannes as a contemptible character, "only tolerated because he belonged to the Solomonic line. He was a glutton and a wine bibber, and was usually drunk, and when he was not in his banquet hall he was in his harim." On the other hand, according to Donald Crummey, he came under the influence of Catholic missionaries working with bishop Justin de Jacobis, converting to Roman Catholicism in 1851.

His ultimate fate is unclear—as well as many of the details of his reign. He is said to have been ruling as Emperor 18 June 1847 when Empress Mennen was defeated in combat near the northern shores of Lake Tana by Kassa of Qwara (the future Tewodros II), who captured Yohannes and Mennen and traded them to Ras Ali for the title of Dejazmach and the territories of the deceased Ras Kinfu in Gojjam. Another source states that when Kassa finally usurped the Imperial throne, Yohannes agreed to step down from the throne on the condition that the new Emperor guarantee that he would not ever be made to reunite with his much hated wife, Empress Mennen.

After this, Yohannes lived as a commoner. In 1856, the Catholics in Ethiopia tried to interest him in returning to the throne, but he was far more interested in undertaking a pilgrimage to Jerusalem; two years later he joined the court of Emperor Tewodros and returned to the Ethiopian Church. He was still part of Tewodros' court in April 1866, when Hormuzd Rassam mentions meeting "the puppet Emperor, Hatse Yuhannes, who was sick and could come to the assembly". One of his letters survives, written 11 June 1869, in which he asks Napoleon III for financial relief. According to a letter written by his nephew, Tesemma Zerubabel, to Antoine d'Abbadie and dated 25 September 1875, Yohannes died "two years previously", which would be 1873.

== Notes ==
Regnal titles
Preceded by Sahle Dengel	Emperor of Ethiopia; 1840–1841; 1845; 1850–1851	Succeeded by Sahle Dengel
