= Iyoas =

Iyoas is the name of two Ethiopian emperors:

- Iyoas I (died 1769)
- Iyoas II (died 1821)
