= Egwale Anbesa =

Proclaimed Emperor of Ethiopia

Egwale Anbesa proclaimed himself nəgusä nägäst of Ethiopia in 1832. According to the Royal chronicles of Abyssinia, he was a Christian Oromo, unrelated to the Solomonic dynasty.

His claim to the Imperial throne was first supported by Ali Faris, who was campaigning at the time against Ras Ali II; Ras Ali defeated Ali Faris, who fled to his home amongst the Raya Oromo, leaving Egwale Anbesa behind.

A prophecy current at the time stated that a king named "Theodore" would arise, and bring peace and plenty to the country. Egwale Anbesa, who had been living until that time as a wandering monk, went to the convent on the Qaha River near Gondar and sounded a horn, declaring that he was that Theodore. That evening Sahla Dengel left the palace and went to where Egwale Anbesa was, and cut off his head, and set it in a tree at Adababay. Egwale Anbesa's only known supporter, who had been with him at his death, became the Emperor's slave, while the pretender's cross and habit were taken back to the palace, and displayed to all visitors.

Preceded by Sahle Dengel	Emperor of Ethiopia	Succeeded by Sahle Dengel
