= Battle of Baçente =

1542 battle

- Part of the Ethiopian–Adal War and Somali-Portuguese conflicts
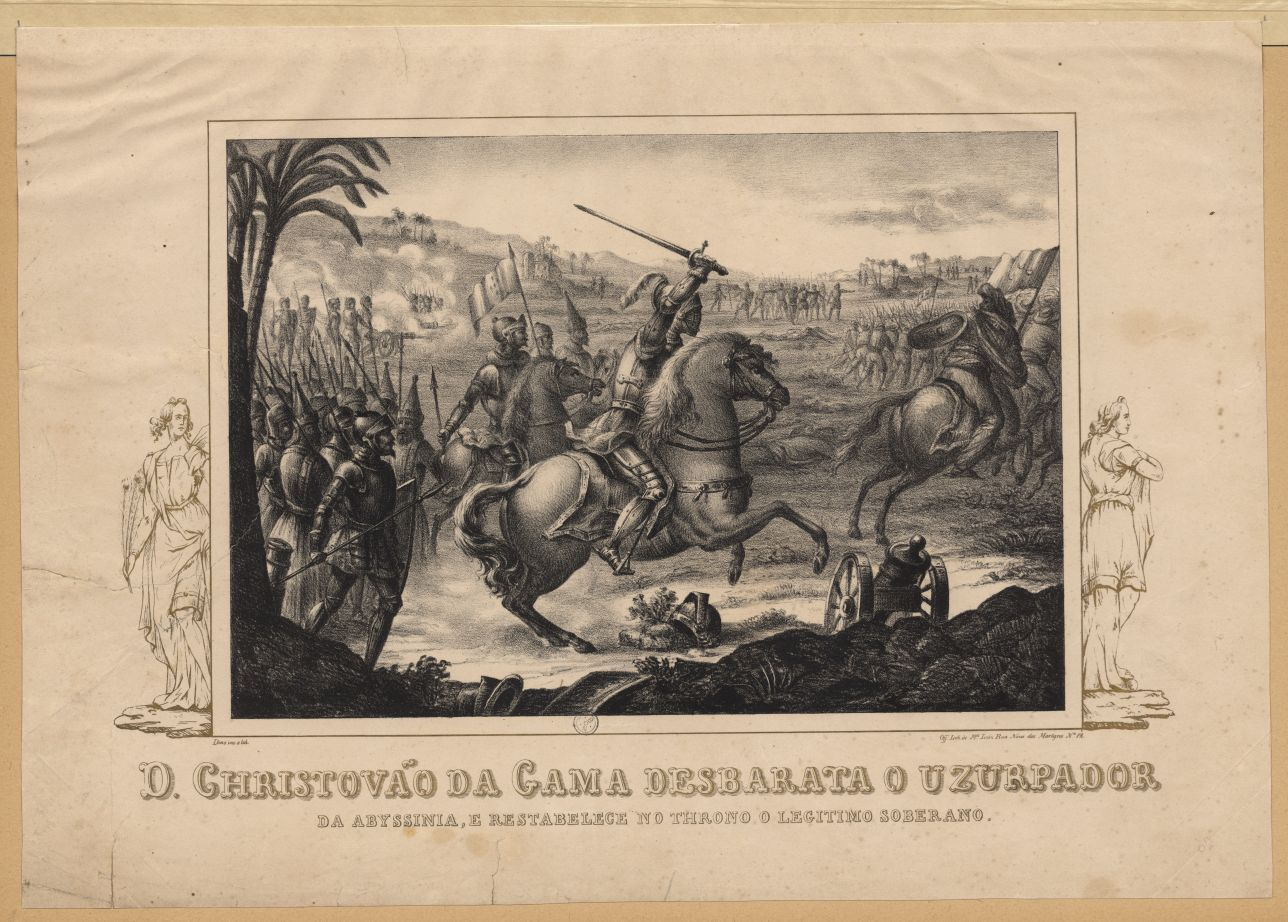
- Engraving of Cristóvão da Gama charging against the Adalite army by António dos Santos c. 1840
Date	February 2, 1542
Location	Amba Senayt, Tigray Province, Ethiopia
Result	Portuguese victory

Belligerents
Portuguese Empire	Adal Sultanate

Commanders and leaders
Cristóvão da Gama	Unknown

Strength
400 Portuguese musketeers	“1,500” archers and "buckler men"

Casualties and losses
8 killed, "several" wounded	Heavy casualties, "reportedly all killed" Nine horses and multiple mules

The Battle of Baçente was fought on February 2, 1542, when a Portuguese army under Cristóvão da Gama took a hillfort held by Adalite forces in northern Ethiopia. The Portuguese suffered minimal casualties, while the defenders were reportedly all killed.

Queen Seble Wongel (likely justifiably) advised against this attack, arguing that Gama should wait until her son the Emperor Gelawdewos could march north from Shewa and join the Portuguese due to Ahmad ibn Ibrahim having known of them. However, Gama was concerned that if he marched around this Muslim-held strongpoint, the local peasantry would be disappointed and stop providing supplies for his troops.

After a probing attack to learn the defenders' defences, which Queen Sabla Wengel initially mistook for a defeat, Gama ordered an attack from three sides directions on the following day. The defenders were annihilated, with negligible losses to the Portuguese. Nine horses and a number of mules were captured, which afterwards proved useful. "As a feat of arms, this capture of notable." A mosque, which had originally been a church before the hillfort was occupied by Imam Ahmad ibn Ibrahim al-Ghazi's men, was reconsecrated as a church, and dedicated to "Our Lady of Victory", and mass was celebrated there the next day. The expeditionary force spent the rest of February there, recovering from the battle.

R.S. Whiteway identified the Portuguese "Baçente" as likely referring to a hill called Amba Sounat in what was called Haramat and is now part of the Eastern Zone in the Tigray Region.
