= Aqushela =

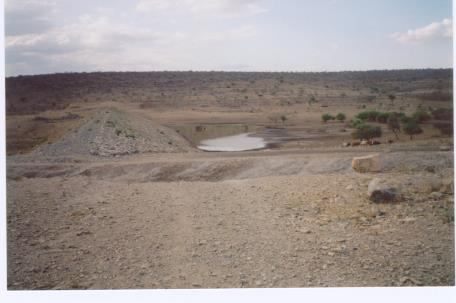
- The reservoir never gets full with water, as evidenced by the trees growing on its bottom

- Location within Ethiopia
- Coordinates: 13.38695882°N 38.83006536°E
- Type: Freshwater artificial lake
- Basin countries: Ethiopia
- Surface area: 0.2 km^{2} (0.077 sq mi)
- Water volume: 0.81×10^{6} m^{3} (660 acre⋅ft) (designed volume)
- Settlements: Hidmo

Aqushela is a typical over-dimensioned reservoir located in the Tanqwa-Abergele woreda of the Tigray Region in Ethiopia. The earthen dam that holds the reservoir was built in 1999 by the Relief Society of Tigray.

== Dam characteristics ==
- Dam height: 11.5 metres
- Dam crest length: 456 metres
- Spillway width: 16 metres

== Capacity ==
- Original capacity: 810,000 m^{3}
- Dead storage: 121,500 m^{3}
- Reservoir area: 20.5 ha

These are the design values. In practice, the runoff from the catchment is largely insufficient to fill the reservoir, which serves only as shallow drinking pond for livestock.

== Irrigation ==
- Designed irrigated area: 50 ha
- Actual irrigated area in 2002: 0 ha

== Environment ==
The catchment of the reservoir is 13.5 km^{2} large. The lithology of the catchment is Precambrian metamorphic rock. Land use is strongly dependent on lithology: soils on metamorphic black limestone are used for cropping, while those on the schist and slate formations are under savannah woodland. Lands on the green-reddish-gray metamorphic banded marl formation are used for settlements. Most common soil types are:

- in the metamorphic black limestone formation: Endoleptic Calcisol at the upper slope (plateau); Endoleptic Cambisol and Vertic Leptosol at the middle slope; Hypercalcic Calcisol at the footslopes and Grumic Vertisol at the lower slopes
- in the schist and slate formations: Leptosol both at the upper slope and at the foot slope positions; Regosol (Calcaric) over Hypercalcic Calcisol at the mid slope position and Fluvisol at the valley bottom
- in the green-reddish-gray metamorphosed banded marl: Leptic Calcisol at the upper slope, Haplic Calcisol at the foot slope, and Fluvisol at the valley bottom
