= Yimam of Yejju =

Ethiopian governor (d. 1828)

Yimam of Yejju (also transliterated Imam; died 1828) was a Ras of Begemder and Enderase (regent) of the Emperor of Ethiopia. He was the son of Gugsa of Yejju.

Upon succeeding his father Gugsa as Ras when Gugsa died in 1825, Yimam was challenged by his brother Marye, who staged an open revolt.

According to Trimingham, Ras Yimam openly supported Islam against the local Ethiopian Church. He also grew so annoyed at Abuna Qerellos III's intervention in the doctrinal dispute over the nature of Christ in support of the Sost Lidet, that he banished the Abuna to the monastery in Lake Hayq, where Abuna Qerellos remained until his death (circa 1828).

While Ras Yimam was away in Gojjam campaigning against Dejazmach Goshu Zewde, Dejazmach Haile Maryam marched from Semien to Gondar where replaced Emperor Gigar with his own choice, Baeda Maryam. When Yimam heard of this, he returned by way of Dengel Ber, pursuing Dejazmach Haile Maryam as far as Waldebba where they fought for three days until 25 December 1825, when Haile fled the battlefield for Semien by way of Wegera where he later died, allowing Ras Yimam to restore Gigar to the throne.

Typically for the Zemene Mesafint, relationships between these major lords quickly changed. As Sven Rubenson describes, Dejazmach Haile Maryam's son Wube was captured in the battle, but Yimam's ally Dejazmach Meru of Dembiya convinced Yimam to free the boy. Not long after, Yimam joined forces with Wube, who had succeeded his father as Dejazmach, against Goshu and Meru in the Battle of Kossober October 1827, defeating their opponents. Goshu fled to sanctuary in Gojjam, while Meru was soon killed after the battle by a soldier. The following year, Ras Yimam "died by violence" in Debre Tabor. He was buried at the church of Iyasus in that town.

== Notes ==
Preceded by Ras Gugsa	Chief of the Yejju	Succeeded by Ras Marye
