= Abuna Qerellos III =

Head (abuna) of the Ethiopian Orthodox Tewahedo Church from 1816 to c. 1828

Qerellos III (Cyril) was an Abuna, or head of the Ethiopian Orthodox Tewahedo Church (1816 – 1828?). In the words of Richard Pankhurst, "A controversial figure, he is reputed to have been fanatical and rapacious."

== Background ==
He came to Ethiopia 12 years after the death of the last effective Abuna, Yosab III, due to the efforts of Ras Wolde Selassie in the last year of the life of the Ras. No sooner had he left Massawa than he sent forth a demand for a house in Chalacot belonging to Nathaniel Pearce, an Englishman then residing in the country, because the Abuna had heard it was the finest one in the realm. When Pearce refused to give up his home, Qerellos forbade all priests of the Ethiopian Church from providing communion until Pearce changed his mind. Only the efforts of Pearce's wife at last led the Englishman to surrender his house and home to the prelate. Pearce reported that shortly thereafter, Qerellos proclaimed that "every man wanting to be confirmed a priest must first bring him four amolehs, or pieces of salt. All new altars, that had been dedicated since the death of the last Abuna, as well as those that had never been consecrated by the Abuna, were to pay also four pieces of salt each; those who wished to become deacons two pieces of salt each; and all the population, with their young children, that had not been confirmed by former Abunas, were to pay one piece of salt each."

A few weeks later when Wolfe Selassie died, Chalacot was sacked by the other warlords of the Zemene Mesafint. Both Pearce and Qerellos fled the town for safety elsewhere: Pearce for Adwa, while the Abuna sought sanctuary at the court of Dejazmach Sabagadis Woldu. In 1819, the Abuna went to Gondar, where he tried to settle the doctrinal disputes that rent the Ethiopian Church; however, when he allegedly supported the Unctionist formula, Qerellos was forced to flee the city to Tigray Province. Dejazmach Sabagadis Woldu apparently extended him protection once again, but eventually came to despise the cleric. A letter he wrote to Pope Peter VII of Alexandria survives, dated to 1827, wherein he complains of the Abuna's behavior, sarcastically asking, "Was it because you hated Ethiopia that you sent him? Did you not know his conduct before, [and] so you sent him?"

Donald Crummey notes that "his fate, even the circumstances of his death, are mysterious." A contemporary account, the Church Missionary Society's Missionary Register for 1828 writes that he is said to be living "in Tigré: he is said to be in a state of perpetual intoxication." Mordechai Abir writes that Ras Yimam banished him to the monastery in Lake Tana, where Qerellos remained until his death, although Abir also notes alternative accounts of Qerellos' death exist: "Another version ... claims that Kerilos was banished to Tigre where after meddling with politics he was killed by Seb'agadis in 1824, or was murdered as a result of a quarrel over some property with one of Seb'agadis's governors". Richard Pankhurst simply states that he died at some point between 1828 and 1830, "apparently murdered."
