= Belesat =

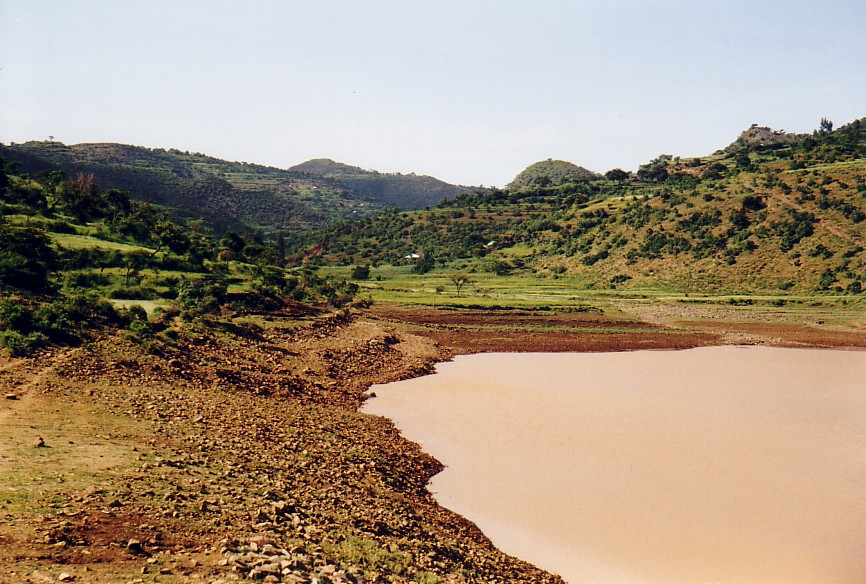

- Location within Ethiopia
- Coordinates: 14.19484988°N 39.11569128°E
- Type: Freshwater artificial lake
- Basin countries: Ethiopia
- Surface area: 0.074 km^{2} (0.029 sq mi)
- Water volume: 0.428×10^{6} m^{3} (347 acre⋅ft)
- Surface elevation: 2,040 m (6,690 ft)
- Settlements: Feresmay

Belesat is a reservoir located in the Inticho woreda of the Tigray Region in Ethiopia. The earthen dam that holds the reservoir was built in 1997 by the Relief Society of Tigray.

== Dam characteristics ==
- Dam height: 15 metres
- Dam crest length: 308 metres
- Spillway width: 19 metres

== Capacity ==
- Original capacity: 428 028 m³
- Dead storage: 60 000 m³
- Reservoir area: 7.4 ha

In 2002, the life expectancy of the reservoir (the duration before it is filled with sediment) was estimated at 15 years.

== Irrigation ==
- Designed irrigated area: 32 ha
- Actual irrigated area in 2002: 20 ha

== Environment ==
The catchment of the reservoir is 4.8 km² large, with a perimeter of 9.62 km and a length of 3670 metres. The reservoir suffers from rapid siltation. The lithology of the catchment is Adigrat Sandstone and Enticho Sandstone. Part of the water that could be used for irrigation is lost through seepage; the positive side-effect is that this contributes to groundwater recharge.
