= Eugenia Kisimova =

Eugenia Kisimova (Bulgarian: Евгения Кисимова) (1831–1885) was a Bulgarian feminist, philanthropist and women's rights activist. She was the founder and president of the Bulgarian women's movement organisation Женска община (1869). She worked for the establishment of girl's schools and the right for equal education opportunities for females.

== Life ==
Eugenia Kisimova was born in Turnovo as the daughter of the wealthy merchant Hadji Georgi Kisimov. She was the sister of the educator and cultural personality Pandeli Kisimov, and through her sister Maria the sister-in-law of the doctor and archaeologist Vasil Beron. She was educated in a school for girls.

As an adult in the 1850s, Kisimova wished for women to participate in society outside of a secluded life in the home. Born into a leading family in Turnovo, she established contacts with noted figures in the cultural and intellectual life, such as Vasil Cholakov, Petko Gorbanov, Petko Slavejkov, Zachary Princely and Stoyan Robovski.

In 1869, she founded the first women's organisation in Bulgaria, the Женска община, and was elected as its first president. The purpose was to provide education for women, and its first action was to raise funds to start schools for girls in the city and the areas around it and employ teachers for them. In 1870, the association also started Sunday schools. The association provided scholarships and made it possible for women to study abroad in countries where higher education was open to women, preferably in Russia and Romania. Several Bulgarian female pioneers had their studies abroad financed by the association, such as Eugenia Shekerdzhieva, who was financed to study in Russia in 1876 and 1879.

During the Russian-Turkish War (1877-1878), Kismova organised the Милосърдие, a fund raising to organize and finance nurses to medical care for the wounded, as well as receive and care for war refugees.
