= Iyasu IV =

Emperor of Ethiopia from 1830 to 1832

Emperor of Ethiopia
- Predecessor: Gigar
- Successor: Gebre Krestos
- Reign: 18 June 1830 – 18 March 1832
- Dynasty: House of Solomon
- Father: Salomon III
- Religion: Ethiopian Orthodox Tewahedo

Iyasu IV (Ge'ez: ኢያሱ) was Emperor of Ethiopia from 18 June 1830 to 18 March 1832, and a member of the Solomonic dynasty. He was the son of Salomon III.

== Reign ==
He was largely a figurehead, set on the throne by the Enderase or Regent, Ras Dori, who had deposed Gigar. However, Iyasu took to riding through the countryside and organizing raids; when Ras Ali II who had succeeded his cousin Ras Dori heard about this, he quickly deposed Iyasu. However, Samuel Gobat records in his journal that Iyasu's fall was due to efforts of the former Emperor Gigar, who "by false testimony" accused Iyasu of inviting Ras Ali's rival, Ali Faris, to depose the Enderase. "It is now said" Gobat wrote on 26 November 1832, "that the old king, Guigar, has procured his death by poison."

== Notes ==
Regnal titles
Preceded by Gigar	Emperor of Ethiopia; 1830–1832	Succeeded by Gebre Krestos
