= Debre Abbay =

Ethiopian Orthodox monastery

Coordinates: 13°52′N 37°59′E

Debre Abbay is a monastery of the Ethiopian Orthodox Church located at the edge of the canyon of the Tekezé River in the Tigray Region of Ethiopia. The monastery dates from the 14th century, and has important connections with Ethiopian history: the Battle of Debre Abbay was fought nearby 14 February 1831; and notable Ethiopian scholars, such as Gedamu Woldegiorgis, continued to be educated there well into the early to mid-1900s.

When Paul B. Henze visited the monastery in 2001, he described it as flourishing and self-sufficient, inhabited by 80 monks, 12 nuns, and "30-odd" priests.

== History ==
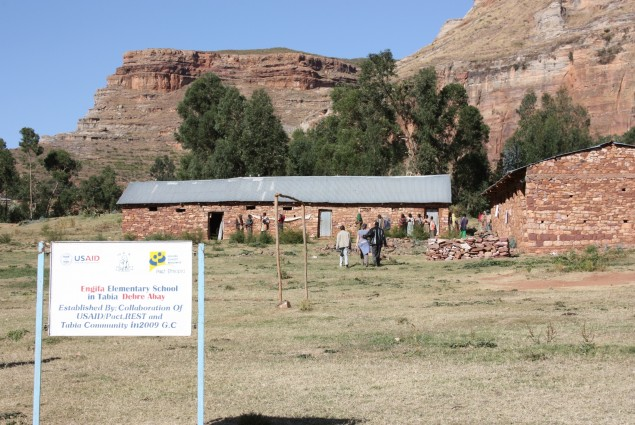
A nearby elementary school

According to Henze, the Memhir or abbot told him that Debre Abbay was founded in 1327 EC (or AD 1334/1335) by Saint Samuel of Waldebba; another personage associated with the monastery was Abba Samuel of Qoyasa.

Mansfield Parkyns, traveling between Adwa and Sudan, stopped at Debre Abbay in early July 1845. He found settlement "built in a deep hollow or chasm, and so nearly concealed, that, when approaching it from some directions, you would scarcely imagine yourself to be near habitations, seeing nothing but a wide tract of table-land before you."

The church of the monastery was bombed by the Italians during the Second Italo-Abyssinian War 17 December 1935. It was rebuilt in the 1950s with donations from the Emperor Haile Selassie.

Debre Abbay was the site of a massacre of civilians by the ENDF in January 2021.
