= Dibdibo =

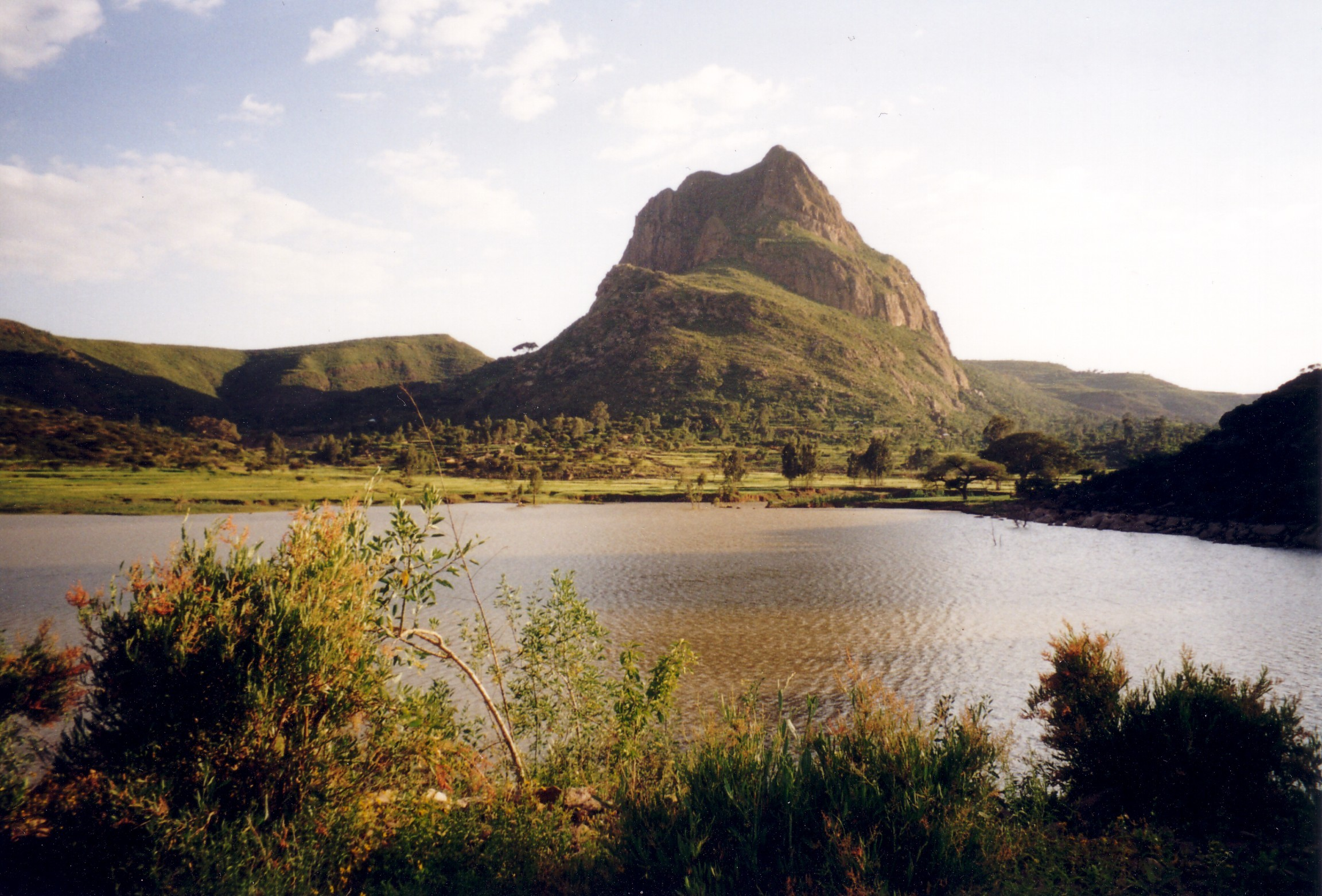

- Location within Ethiopia
- Coordinates: 14.26107719°N 39.08148865°E
- Type: Freshwater artificial lake
- Basin countries: Ethiopia
- Surface area: 0.1724 km^{2} (0.0666 sq mi)
- Water volume: 1.0229×10^{6} m^{3} (829.3 acre⋅ft)
- Settlements: Inticho

Dibdibo is a reservoir named after the homonymous village, located in the Inticho woreda of the Tigray Region in Ethiopia. The earthen dam that holds the reservoir was built in 1999 by the Relief Society of Tigray.

== Dam characteristics ==
- Dam height: 17.8 metres
- Dam crest length: 433 metres
- Spillway width: 15 metres

== Capacity ==
- Original capacity: 1 022 900 m³
- Dead storage: 153 435 m³
- Reservoir area: 17.24 ha

In 2002, the life expectancy of the reservoir (the duration before it is filled with sediment) was estimated at 22 years.

== Irrigation ==
- Designed irrigated area: 100 ha
- Actual irrigated area in 2002: 70 ha

== Environment ==
The catchment of the reservoir is 7 km² large. The reservoir suffers from rapid siltation. The lithology of the catchment is Adigrat Sandstone, Enticho Sandstone, tertiary basalt and Precambrian metavolcanics. Part of the water that could be used for irrigation is lost through seepage; the positive side-effect is that this contributes to groundwater recharge.
