= Dedebit Credit and Saving Institution SC =

Ethiopian microfinance bank

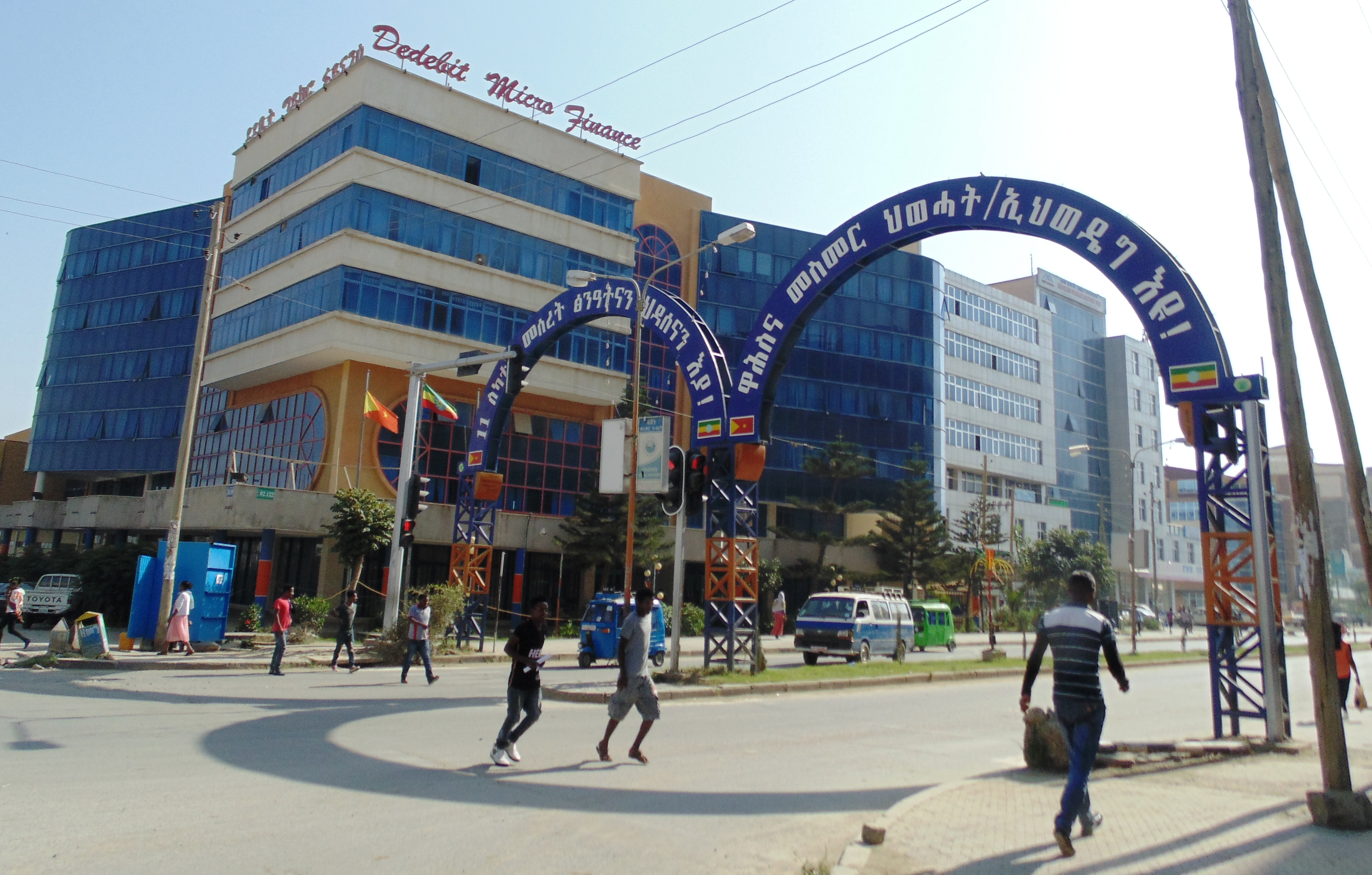
DECSI building in Mekelle, Tigray Region.

Dedebit Credit and Savings Institution SC (DECSI) is a microfinance institution operating in Tigray Region, in northern Ethiopia. With over 460,000 customers, the DECSI is one of the four largest MFIs in Africa.

== History ==
In 1993, the Relief Society of Tigray (REST), the main NGO in the region, launched a socio-economic poverty survey in rural areas. Lack of access to credit appears as one of the major obstacles to the rehabilitation of the region and its development.

A program of credit was created to help increase agricultural production, stimulate the local economy, reduce the influence of moneylenders and increase incomes of the poor. The first operations began in 1994 and the organization was legally recognized in 1996 as part of the first law on microfinance in Ethiopia enacted that year.

During its growth DECSI received financial support from Novib (Netherlands), Norwegian Peoples Aid and SOS FAIM.
