= Mitraha Island =

Island in Ethiopia

Mitraha Island (Amharic: መትራሃ ደሴት Mätraha Däset) is located in the northeastern part of Lake Tana in Ethiopia, about a mile from the lake's shore. It has a latitude and longitude of 12°11′N 37°34′E. The island contains the ruins of a number of churches.

== History ==
The first church built on the island, by the Ethiopian Emperor Dawit I, was torched by Imam Ahmad ibn Ibrahim al-Ghazi. Later structures include a big masonry church constructed by the Ethiopian Emperor Yohannes I and the mausoleum of the Emperor Iyasu I. These edifices were also burned in 1887 by Dervish raiders.

When Arthur J. Hayes visited Mitraha on 14 January 1904, he found it "a perfectly pretty islet, with quaint thatched cottages among foliage and a ruinous old church"—the one Iyasu I was entombed in. Although the inhabitants food sources were limited to poultry and "durrha when we can get it", they had stopped fishing from the lake since the death of Emperor Yohannes I; Hayes speculates this out of superstition. Hayes continues, "The island is traversed in all directions by narrow tracked marked by trodden leaves, and there is a thick undergrowth of weeds, thistles, and thorns." He was much intrigued by a spider "about the size of a shilling, with a speckled abdomen and legs of enormous length" which appeared to be found only on Mitraha.
