= Battle of Debre Abbay =

1831 battle in Ethiopia

- Part of Zemene Mesafint
Date	14 February 1831
Location	Mai Islami, Ethiopia
Result	Victory for Ras Marye

Belligerents
Loyalists to Sabagadis	Loyalists to Ras Marye

Commanders and leaders
Dejazmach Sabagadis (executed)	Ras Marye of Yejju †; Wube Haile Mariam

The Battle of Debre Abbay, also known as the Battle of Mai Islami, was a conflict between Ras Marye of Yejju, regent of the Emperor of Ethiopia, and his rival from Tigray, Dejazmach Sabagadis of Agame. Although Ras Marye lost his life in the battle, Dejazmach Sabagadis was defeated and executed by Ras Marye's followers after surrendering.

== Background ==
Ras Marye had inherited the mantle of regent of the Emperor of Ethiopia, and while admittedly a Christian, his Oromo ancestry caused much resentment from the other Christian aristocrats and nobles of Ethiopia. Irob warlord and ruler of Tigray, dejazmach Sabagadis Woldu attempted to exploit this antipathy. They succeeded in forming a coalition with his fellow Christian lords of Gojjam, Lasta and Semien against Ras Marye. Wube then married Dinqinesh, the daughter of Dejazmach Sabgadis, to foster an alliance against Yimam's successor, Ras Marye Gugsa.

In 1830 however, Ras Marye invaded Semien, and Sabagadis broke his oath by not coming to Wube's aid, thus leaving Semien to be ravaged by conflict. Subagadis watched the battle on the border of Lasta, and subsequently did not come to the aid of Wube. In a dramatic shift of alliances, Wube sided with Marye against Sabagadis; in turn Sabagadis invaded Semien with his forces and drove Wube out of his fortresses of ‘‘Amba Tazzan’’ and ‘‘Amba Hay’’. Sabagadis recognized Wube's half brother and rival Merso Haile Maryam as the governor of Semien before his return to Tigray.

== Battle ==
In February 1831, Wube and Ras Marye responded with a vigorous military campaign into Tigray. Marye and Wube's coalition met the forces of Sabagadis near the Tekeze river and conflict ensued. The opposing armies met on 14 February 1831 at Mai Islami near Debre Abbay (which is why this battle is also sometimes called the Battle of Mai Islami). Although Sabagadis had the superiority of a far larger number of firearms, his matchlockmen were poorly employed and failed to overcome the vaunted Oromo cavalry. The battle resulted in immense casualties, one of whom was Ras Marye. Defeated, the Dejazmach sought to escape the vengeance of Ras Marye's kinsmen by surrendering to his former ally Wube; Wube handed the Dejazmach over to his victorious allies, and the Oromo executed Sebagadis.

== Aftermath ==
In the aftermath of Sabagadis's death, Tigray Province plunged into chaos. The Oromo ravaged Tigray under their new leader, Ras Dori of Yejju. Still, it withdrew to Begemder due to his increasing illness before his death. Sabagadis' many enemies and rivals turned against his offspring. Moreover, even Sabagadis's own sons and supporters fought each other for ascendancy. Wube took advantage of the divided aristocracy, and pacified the region after a series of wars. He spared Sabagadis's sons (his wife Dinqinesh's brothers) and appointed them as tributary provincial governors in return for their submission.

== See also ==
- Debre Abbay massacre (2021)
