= Marye of Yejju =

Ethiopian governor (1830–1832)

Marye of Yejju (died 14 February 1831) was a Ras of Begemder and Enderase (regent) of the Emperor of Ethiopia. He was the brother of his predecessor Ras Yimam.

The missionary Samuel Gobat had a low opinion of Marye. He wrote in his journal, "A character worse then [sic?] is attributed to Mariam [Marye], cannot be well given to a prince. He does justice to none. Far from punishing a soldier for robbing or killing his companion, he publicly commends him, as a man of courage. It is said that he has ordered all of his soldiers, on entering Oubea's territories, to kill every human being they meet, without distinction of age or sex; threatening with death the soldier, known to have spared a single person in his power." However, Gobat's opinion may have been influenced by a raid Marye's men made on Gondar 14 May 1830, which he described immediately before this passage.

== Life ==
During the rule of his father, Ras Gugsa of Yejju, Marye challenged his father's authority with an open rebellion; Marye was defeated in battle. After Gugsa's death Marye also challenged the succession of his own brother Yimam by rebelling.

Marye had his capital in Debre Tabor, from 1828 to 1831. Upon Meru of Dembiya's death, he was given that nobleman's territories in Dembiya, Wegera and Belessa to rule, but he had not held them for very long before Meru's relations came forward with their own claims; the immediate claimants included Dejazmach Walde Tekle, who claimed the lands for himself, and Welette Tekle, who claimed them for her son Kinfu. The struggle over control of these territories continued long after Marye's death, eventually involving Empress Menen Liben Amede.

Marye's final military campaign was against Ras Sabagadis of Agame, who had succeeded Wolda Selassie as the dominant warlord of Tigray. Supported by Wube Haile Maryam of Semien and Goshu of Gojjam, Marye led his army across the Takazze River and defeated Sebagadis at the Battle of Debre Abbay (14 February 1831). However, Ras Marye was killed in the battle, and Sebagadis surrendered to Wube. Wube handed the defeated warlord to Ras Marye's Oromo troops, who killed their defeated foe, and ravaged Tigray in revenge for their leader's death.

== Notes ==
Preceded by Ras Yimam	Chief of the Yejju	Succeeded by Ras Dori
