= Enticho =

Enticho Inticho, Intich'ew, Enticcio, Entichew, Entiscio, Ent'ech'o
- Town
- Location within Ethiopia
- Coordinates: 14°16′N 39°09′E
- Country: Ethiopia
- Region: Tigray
- Zone: Misraqawi (Eastern)
- Woreda: Enticho
- Elevation: 1,964 m (6,444 ft)

Population (2005)
  - Total: 9,048

Enticho is a town in northern Ethiopia located in the Central Zone of the Tigray Region. It is the administrative center of Enticho woreda.

== History ==
=== 19th Century ===
Enticho is the location where on 1 July 1889 that Fitawrari Dabbab Araya (later Dejazmach) met Dejazmach Embaye. Dabbab was taken prisoner by Ras Alula Engida's followers two weeks later.

=== 20th Century ===
After the Italian conquest, a telegraph office was opened in the town on 22 April 1936, and a post office on 1 July. Records at the Nordic Africa Institute website provide details of a primary school in the town in 1968. More recently, Enticho was the site where the Ethiopian People's Revolutionary Democratic Front defeated armed units of the Ethiopian People's Revolutionary Party (EPRP) on 23 March 1978, and pursued them back to the EPRP's stronghold on Mount Asimba.

== Demographics ==
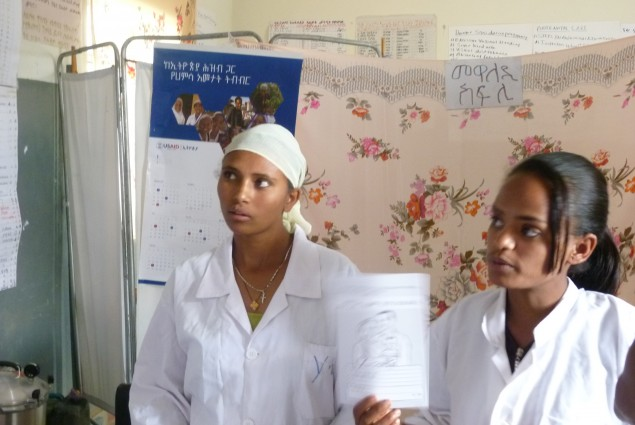
Health extension workers near Inticho in 2017

Based on figures from the Central Statistical Agency, in 2005 Enticho has an estimated total population of 9,048 of whom 4,415 are men and 4,633 are women. The 1994 census reported it had a total population of 5,198 of whom 2,351 were men and 2,847 women.
