= 570s =

Decade

The 570s decade ran from January 1, 570, to December 31, 579.

== Events ==
=== 570 ===
==== By place ====
====== Europe ======
- Battle of Gwen Ystrad: A British alliance is forged between the kingdoms of Strathclyde, Bryneich and Elmet (approximate date).
- Spoleto becomes the capital of an independent duchy, under the Lombard chieftain Faroald (approximate date).
- Leutfred becomes duke of Alemannia (modern Germany).

====== Persia ======
- Ctesiphon, capital of the Sassanid Empire, becomes the largest city in the world, taking the lead from Constantinople, capital of the Byzantine Empire.

====== Arabia ======
- Muhammad, Islamic prophet, is born in Mecca (today's Saudi Arabia). His father Abdullah ibn Abd al-Muttalib dies a few months before his birth, so he and his mother Aminah bint Wahb are protected by Muhammad's paternal grandfather, Abdul Muttalib, who is recognized as the leading figure in his tribe, the Quraysh.
- Abraha, Christian ruler of coastal Yemen, who was acting as a general for the Christian kingdom in Abyssinia, begins a military expedition in Arabia against the predominantly pagan Quraysh of Mecca, known as the Year of the Elephant.

==== By topic ====
====== Religion ======
- A limestone statue of Boddhisattva is created in Henan (approximate date).
- The first mention is made of the Spear of Destiny (approximate date).
- The Jews of Clermont-Ferrand are forced to convert to Christianity.
- Year of the Elephant, according to Islamic tradition.

=== 571 ===
==== By place ====
====== Europe ======
- The Visigoths under King Liuvigild invade the Byzantine province of Spania (modern Andalusia), and seize the city of Córdoba. After the death of his brother Liuva I, he becomes sole ruler of the Visigothic Kingdom (approximate date).
- Benevento becomes the capital of an independent duchy, under the Lombard chieftain Zotto (approximate date).

====== Britain ======
- Battle of Bedcanford: The Anglo-Saxons under King Cuthwulf fight against the Britons, and conquer the settlements of Aylesbury, Benson, Eynsham and Limbury (according to the Anglo-Saxon Chronicle).
- Wuffa becomes the first king of East Anglia, as recorded in the Anglo-Saxon royal genealogies (approximate date).

==== By topic ====
====== Religion ======
- The Monophysites again reject the Council of Chalcedon, causing another schism.

=== 572 ===
==== By place ====
====== Byzantine Empire ======
- Byzantine–Sassanid War of 572–591: Emperor Justin II refuses to pay the annual tribute to Khosrau I, putting an end to the 50-year peace treaty established ten years earlier. The Armenians are considered allies to the Byzantine Empire, and Justin sends a Byzantine army into Persian territory, besieging the fortress city of Nisibis (modern Turkey).

====== Europe ======
- Siege of Pavia (569–572): King Alboin captures Ticinum (Pavia); after a siege the Byzantine garrison surrenders to the Lombards. The city is of strategic importance, lying at the rivers Po and Ticino, and becomes the capital of the Kingdom of the Lombards.
- June 28 – Alboin, king of the Lombards, is murdered at Verona in his palace, at the instigation of his wife Rosamund (daughter of the Gepid king Cunimund), and her henchman, Helmechis (the king's squire); both flee to seek Byzantine protection in Ravenna. Alboin is succeeded as king by Cleph, who is not related by blood.

====== Britain ======
- Theodric succeeds his brother Æthelric as king of Bernicia (southeastern Scotland). He rules until 579.

====== Asia ======
- Taspar Qaghan succeeds his brother Muqan Qaghan as ruler (khagan) of the Turkic Khaganate (Central Asia).
- Bidatsu succeeds his father Kinmei and ascends to the throne of Japan as the 30th emperor.

====== Mesoamerica ======
- Calakmul defeats Tikal, bringing an end to the First Tikal-Calakmul War.

=== 573 ===
==== By place ====
====== Byzantine Empire ======
- Byzantine–Sassanid War: Persian forces under the command of King Khosrau I capture the Byzantine stronghold of Dara, after a six-month siege. Meanwhile, a smaller Persian army under Adarmahan advances from Babylon through the desert, crosses the Euphrates River and ravages Syria. The cities of Apamea and Antiochia are plundered.

====== Europe ======
- King Sigibert I goes to war against his half brother Chilperic I of Neustria at the urging of his wife, Brunhilda. He appeals to the Germans on the right bank of the Rhine for help, and they obligingly attack the environs of Paris and Chartres.
- The Lombards again raid Southern Gaul, but are defeated by the Franks under Mummolus, patricius and son of the Gallo-Roman count of Auxerre, and are driven out.
- King Cleph completes the Lombard conquest of Tuscany (Central Italy) and extends his dominion to the gates of Ravenna.
- Sigibert I appoints Gregory to succeed his mother's cousin, Eufronius, as bishop of Tours (approximate date).

====== Britain ======
- Battle of Arfderydd: The forces of Gwenddoleu ap Ceidio are killed by the sons of Eliffer, Gwrgi and Peredur. Myrddin Wyllt goes mad watching this defeat (according to the Annales Cambriae).

==== By topic ====
====== Religion ======
- Pope John III is forced by the Lombards to retire from Rome, and takes up residence at the Catacombs along the Via Appia (approximate date).

=== 574 ===
==== By place ====
====== Byzantine Empire ======
- December 7 – Emperor Justin II retires due to recurring seizures of insanity; he abdicates the throne in favour of his general Tiberius. Justin proclaims him Caesar and adopts him as his own son.
- Winter – Empress Sophia and Tiberius agree to a one year truce with the Persians, at the cost of 45,000 solidi. The truce applies only to the Mesopotamian front; in the Caucasus, war continues.

====== Europe ======
- King Cleph is murdered after an 18-month reign by a guard, a slave who he has mistreated. For the next decade, the Lombard Kingdom is governed by independent duchies (Rule of the Dukes).
- The Visigoths under King Liuvigild invade Cantabria (Northern Spain), and destroy the city of Amaya (Burgos). He massacres the inhabitants and adds the province to the Visigothic Kingdom.
- Áedán mac Gabráin becomes king of Dál Riata (Scotland) (approximate Date).

====== Asia ======
- The Persian Empire overthrows the Axumite- and Byzantine-affiliated regimes in Yemen (Arabian Peninsula).

====== Unidentified ======
- A major volcanic eruption occurs in the Antarctic.

==== By topic ====
====== Religion ======
- July 13 – Pope John III dies at Rome after a 13-year reign, until June of next year the Holy See becomes sede vacante.
- Marius Aventicensis is made bishop of Aventicum (modern Avenches).

=== 575 ===
==== By place ====
====== Europe ======
- The Franks under Sigibert I pursue his half brother Chilperic I, and conquer the cities Poitiers and Tournai. While he is proclaimed new king of Neustria by the nobles, Sigibert is assassinated at Vitry-en-Artois (Northern Gaul) by hirelings of Fredegund.
- Childebert II succeeds his father Sigibert I as king of Austrasia. His mother Brunhilda becomes regent and seeks protection from Guntram, king of Burgundy. He adopts Childebert as his own son and heir. A group of Frankish aristocrats rule Austrasia.
- The Visigoths under King Liuvigild invade the Suebian Kingdom (Northern Spain). Intermarriage between Goths and non-Goths is allowed in the Visigothic Kingdom (approximate date).

====== Britain ======
- The Convention of Druim Cett: Irish kings discuss the relationship between them and King Áedán mac Gabráin of Dál Riata. The Irish colony (now western Scotland) is confirmed, and rights to tax and levy are agreed to between the rulers.
- The Anglo-Saxon kingdom of East Anglia is divided into the English counties of Norfolk and Suffolk, and perhaps the eastern part of the Cambridgeshire Fens (approximate date).

====== Asia Minor ======
- Byzantine–Sassanid War: A Byzantine army under command of Maurice drives the Persians from Cappodocia (modern Turkey), and strengthens the Byzantine position in Caucasian Albania.
- Alexander of Tralles, Greek physician, writes "Libri duodecim de re Medica" (approximate date).

====== Asia ======
- Tardu succeeds his father Istämi, as governor (yabgu) of the Western Turkic Khaganate (Central Asia).

==== By topic ====
====== Religion ======
- Zhiyi, Chinese monk, travels to Mount Tiantai for intensive study and practice. He works with a group of disciples on the Indian meditation of śamatha and vipaśyanā.
- June 2 – Pope Benedict I succeeds Pope John III as the 62nd pope.

=== 576 ===
==== By place ====
====== Byzantine Empire ======
- Byzantine–Sassanid War: A Persian army under King Khosrau I breaks through the Caucasus into Anatolia (modern Turkey). They attack the cities of Theodosiopolis and Caesarea, but are thwarted. Khosrau is forced to retreat and sacks Sebasteia. On the way home, he is intercepted by a Byzantine force under Justinian (magister militum of the East), and severely defeated near Melitene. The royal baggage is captured, and many Persians drown, while escaping across the Euphrates.

====== Europe ======
- Baduarius, son-in-law of the Byzantine emperor Justin II, is sent to Italy to resist the Lombard conquest. He leads an aborted counter-assault against the Lombards and dies soon after.
- The Visigoths under King Liuvigild establish the capital of their kingdom in Toledo, located in central Spain (approximate date).

====== Asia ======
- The Göktürks under Tardu cross the Cimmerian Bosporus into the Crimea, and besiege the city of Panticapaeum (Ukraine).
- Jinji becomes king of the Korean kingdom of Silla.

=== 577 ===
==== By place ====
====== Byzantine Empire ======
- Byzantine–Sassanid War: A Byzantine expeditionary force under command of Justinian (magister militum) invades Caucasian Albania, launching raids across the Caspian Sea against the Persians.
- Summer – Tiberius, Byzantine co-ruler (Caesar), establishes a naval base at Derbent on the Caspian Sea to construct a Byzantine fleet (approximate date).
- Winter – Maurice is appointed commander-in-chief of the Byzantine army in the East. He succeeds Justinian, despite complete lack of military experience.

====== Europe ======
- Battle of Deorham: The Anglo-Saxons under Ceawlin of Wessex invade the lower Severn Valley, and defeat the British Celts at Dyrham (South West England). After the battle, the Saxons occupy the three cities: Cirencester, Gloucester and Bath, bringing their advance to the Bristol Channel (according to the Anglo-Saxon Chronicle).
- Reccopolis (modern Zorita de los Canes) in Hispania is founded by King Liuvigild, in honour of his son Reccared.

====== Asia ======
- Winter – Northern Qi, one of the Northern Dynasties, is conquered by Northern Zhou under Emperor Wu Di. He orders the last ruler (Gao Wei) and other members of the Gao clan to commit suicide. Northern China, above the Yangtze River, is once again brought under the control of a single power.

==== By topic ====
====== Religion ======
- The Temple of Dendur, dedicated to the Egyptian gods Isis, Harpocrates (Horus) and Osiris, is converted for use as a Christian church (approximate date).
- Eutychius is restored as patriarch of Constantinople, after an exile of 12 years at Amasia (modern Turkey).
- Muhammad, age 6, returns to his immediate family, but within a year his mother Aminah bint Wahb dies.

====== Science and Invention ======
- A predecessor of the modern match, small sticks of pinewood impregnated with sulfur, are first used in China. Besieged by military forces of Northern Zhou and Chen, Northern Qi court ladies use the "lighting sticks" to start fires for cooking and heating.

=== 578 ===
==== By place ====
====== Byzantine Empire ======
- Byzantine–Sassanid War: A Byzantine army under command of Maurice (magister militum per Orientem) invades Upper Mesopotamia, and raids on both sides of the Tigris. He deports 70,000 captives from Hyrcania to Cyprus, and installs military colonists to guard the strategic locations.
- October 5 – Emperor Justin II dies after several periods of insanity. On the advice of his wife Sophia, he has raised his general Tiberius to the rank of co-emperor (Caesar). From December 574 he has ruled jointly with Sophia, and now succeeds them as emperor of the Byzantine Empire.

====== Asia ======
- Summer – Emperor Wu Di engages in military campaigns on two fronts: against the invading Göktürks to the north and against the Chen dynasty in the south.
- Wu Di, age 35, dies from an illness, and is succeeded by his eldest son Xuan Di as emperor of Northern Zhou.
- Kongō Gumi, the world's oldest construction company (578–2006), is founded in Osaka (Japan).

=== 579 ===
==== By place ====
====== Byzantine Empire ======
- Byzantine-Sassanid War: King Khosrau I seeks peace, but dies before an agreement can be reached. The Mesopotamian front becomes stalemated, and Maurice (magister militum of the East) fortifies the borders in Armenia and Syria.

====== Central America ======
- September 2 – Uneh Chan becomes the ruler of the Mayan city state of Calakmul in southern Mexico and reigns until 611.

====== Europe ======
- Hermenegild, son of Visigothic king Liuvigild, marries Ingund. He rebels against his father, starting in Seville (Southern Spain), and declares himself Catholic.
- Heavy taxes levied by Merovingian king Chilperic I of Neustria produce a revolt at Limoges (central France), as he sells bishoprics to the highest bidder.

====== Britain ======
- Frithuwald succeeds his brother Theodoric as king of Bernicia (Scotland). He rules from 579–585 (approximate date).

====== Persia ======
- Khosrau I dies after a 48-year reign, during which he has extended his realm from the River Oxus to the Red Sea. He is succeeded by his son Hormizd IV, who becomes king of the Persian Empire.
- Summer – Hormizd IV refuses to give up territories, and breaks off negotiations with the Byzantine Empire. The Türks invade Khorasan and reach Hyrcania on the Caspian Sea.

====== Asia ======
- Emperor Xuan Di abdicates the throne to his son Jing Di, age 6, and rules as regent the Northern Zhou dynasty.
- Jinpyeong becomes king of the Korean kingdom of Silla.

==== By topic ====
====== Religion ======
- July 30 – Pope Benedict I dies after a 4-year reign, and is succeeded by Pelagius II as the 63rd pope. During the Lombard siege of Rome, he labors to solve the problems of famine.
- Pelagius II sends Gregory as his apocrisiarius (ambassador to the imperial court in Constantinople). He is part of a Roman delegation to ask for military aid against the Lombards.
- Leander, Catholic bishop of Seville, is exiled by Liuvigild and withdraws to Constantinople. At the Byzantine court he composes works against Arianism (approximate date).

== Births ==
570

- Ammar ibn Yasir, companion of Muhammad.
- Chen Yuan, crown prince of the Chen dynasty (approximate date)
- Childebert II, king of Austrasia (d. 595)
- Gao Heng, emperor of Northern Qi (d. 577)
- Imerius of Immertal, Swiss monk (approximate date)
- Khosrow II, last great Sasanian king of Iran (d. 628)
- Li Dashi, Chinese official and historian (d. 628)
- Muhammad, last prophet of Islam (d. 632) (approximate date)
- Namri Songtsen, king of Tibet (approximate date)
- Pei Ji, chancellor of the Tang dynasty (d. 629)
- Pybba, king of Mercia (approximate date)
- Rigunth, daughter of Chilperic I (d. 585)
- Theodelinda, queen of the Lombards (d. 628)

571

- Muhammad, prophet of Islam (d. 632) – see also 570
- Li Jing, general and chancellor of the Tang dynasty (d. 649)
- Wang Gui, chancellor of the Tang dynasty (d. 639)
- Yang Jun, prince of the Sui dynasty (d. 600)

572

- Chen Shuda, Chinese statesman
- Hovnan Mayravanetsi, Armenian philosopher

573

- Abu Bakr, Muslim Caliph (approximate date)
- Chen Yin, crown prince of the Chen dynasty
- Dou Jiande, general of the Sui dynasty (d. 621)
- Jing Di, emperor of Northern Zhou (d. 581)
- Lupus of Sens, French bishop (approximate date)

574

- February 7 – Shōtoku, prince and regent of Japan (d. 622)
- Xiao Yu, prince of the Liang Dynasty (d. 647)

575

- Al-Khansa, Arabic poet (d. 645)
- Heraclius, emperor of the Byzantine Empire (approximate date)
- Wen Yanbo, chancellor of the Tang dynasty (d. 637)

576

- Abu Ayyub al-Ansari, friend of Muhammad (approximate date)
- Gao Shilian, chancellor of the Tang dynasty (d. 647)

577

- Pope Agatho (approximate date)
- Princess Ningyuan, Chinese princess
- Uthman ibn Affan, Muslim Caliph (d. 656)

579

- Fang Xuanling, chancellor of the Tang dynasty (d. 648)

== Deaths ==
570

- January 15 – Íte of Killeedy, Irish nun
- Abdullah ibn Abd al-Muttalib, father of Muhammad (b. 545)
- Abraha, an Aksumite army general, Islamic tradition places his death immediately after his expedition to the Hejaz
- Antonina, wife of Belisarius (approximate date)
- Armel, Breton prince and bishop (approximate date)
- Fei Di, emperor of the Chen dynasty
- Gildas, British cleric (approximate date)
- John Philoponus, Aristotelian commentator (b. 490)
- Soga no Iname, leader of the Soga clan
- Zhang Yao'er, empress dowager of the Chen dynasty (b. 506)

571

- April 15 – Kinmei, emperor of Japan (b. 509)
- November 29? – Brendan of Birr, Irish monastic saint
- Fall – killed in dynastic intrigue
  - Gao Yan, prince of Northern Qi (b. 558)
  - He Shikai, high official of Northern Qi (b. 524)
- Liuva I, king of the Visigoths (or 572)
- May 20 – Saint Yared, Axumite composer (b. 505)
- Narses dies at Domitian's palace in Rome.

572

- June 28 – Alboin, king of the Lombards
- Æthelric of Bernicia, Scottish king
- Báetán mac Muirchertaig, High King of Ireland
- Corippus, Byzantine epic poet (approximate date)
- Eochaid mac Domnaill, High King of Ireland
- Hulü Guang, general of Northern Qi (b. 515)
- Liuva I, king of the Visigoths (or 571)
- Muqan Qaghan, ruler of the Göktürks
- Waldrada, Lombard princess (b. 531)
- Wei Shou, Chinese author (b. 506)
- Yuwen Hu, regent of Northern Zhou (b. 515)
- Sky Witness, ruler of Calakmul

573

- June 11 – Emilian of Cogolla, Iberic saint (b. 472)
- Brendan of Birr, Irish abbot (approximate date)
- Gwenddoleu ap Ceidio, Brythonic king
- Narses, Byzantine general (b. 478)
- Wang Lin, Chinese general (b. 526)

574

- July 13 – Pope John III
- Cleph, king of the Lombards (or 575)
- Conall mac Comgaill, king of Dál Riata
- Xuan, empress of Northern Zhou
- Queen Jiso

575

- August 2 – Ahudemmeh, Syriac Orthodox Grand Metropolitan of the East.
- Áed mac Echach, king of Connacht (Ireland)
- Cerbonius, bishop of Populonia (Central Italy)
- Istämi, ruler (yabgu) of the Western Turkic Khaganate
- Sigebert I, king of Austrasia (approximate date)

576

- May 28 – Saint Germain, bishop of Paris
- Baduarius, Byzantine aristocrat (approximate date)

577

- August 31 – John Scholasticus, patriarch of Constantinople
- Aldate, bishop and saint
- Aminah bint Wahb, mother of Muhammad
- Brendan, Irish abbot (approximate date)
- Gao Heng, emperor of Northern Qi (b. 570)
- Gao Wei, emperor of Northern Qi (b. 557)
- Gao Yanzong, prince of Northern Qi
- Lu Lingxuan, noblewoman of Northern Qi
- Mu Tipo, high official of Northern Qi
- Xiao Zhuang, prince of the Southern Dynasties (b. 548)

578

- July 30 – Jacob Baradaeus, bishop of Edessa
- October 5 – Justin II, Byzantine emperor
- Abdul Muttalib, grandfather of Islamic prophet Muhammad
- Wu Di, emperor of Northern Zhou (b. 543)
- Wu Mingche, general of the Chen dynasty (b. 512)
- Wuffa, king of East Anglia (approximate date)
- Yuwen Xian, prince of Northern Zhou (b. 544)
- Approximate date -
  - Bhavyaviveka, Indian Madhyamaka scholar
  - Hatim al-Tai, Arabian poet
  - John Malalas, Byzantine chronicler (b. c.491)

579

- July 30 – Pope Benedict I
- Khosrau I, king of the Persian Empire
- Theodric, king of Bernicia (Scotland)

== Bibliography ==
- Greatrex, Geoffrey; Lieu, Samuel N. C. (2002). The Roman Eastern Frontier and the Persian Wars (Part II, 363–630 AD). London: Routledge. ISBN 0-415-14687-9.
