= 572 =

Calendar year

572 in various calendars
Gregorian calendar	572; DLXXII
Ab urbe condita	1325
Armenian calendar	21; ԹՎ ԻԱ
Assyrian calendar	5322
Balinese saka calendar	493–494
Bengali calendar	−22 – −21
Berber calendar	1522
Buddhist calendar	1116
Burmese calendar	−66
Byzantine calendar	6080–6081
Chinese calendar	辛卯年 (Metal Rabbit); 3269 or 3062 — to — 壬辰年 (Water Dragon); 3270 or 3063
Coptic calendar	288–289
Discordian calendar	1738
Ethiopian calendar	564–565
Hebrew calendar	4332–4333
- Hindu calendars
Vikram Samvat	628–629
Shaka Samvat	493–494
Kali Yuga	3672–3673
Holocene calendar	10572
Iranian calendar	50 BP – 49 BP
Islamic calendar	52 BH – 51 BH
Javanese calendar	460–461
Julian calendar	572; DLXXII
Korean calendar	2905
Minguo calendar	1340 before ROC 民前1340年
Nanakshahi calendar	−896
Seleucid era	883/884 AG
Thai solar calendar	1114–1115
Tibetan calendar	ལྕགས་མོ་ཡོས་ལོ་ (female Iron-Hare); 698 or 317 or −455 — to — ཆུ་ཕོ་འབྲུག་ལོ་ (male Water-Dragon); 699 or 318 or −454

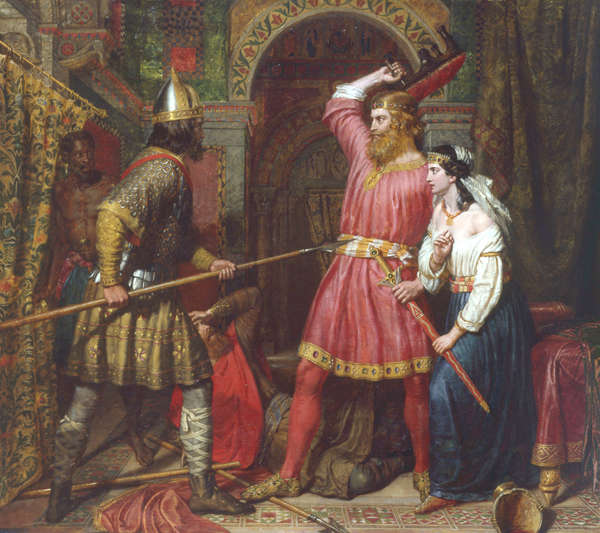
Assassination of the Lombard king Alboin

Year 572 (DLXXII) was a leap year starting on Friday of the Julian calendar. The denomination 572 for this year has been used since the early medieval period, when the Anno Domini calendar era became the prevalent method in Europe for naming years.

== Events ==
=== By place ===
==== Byzantine Empire ====
- Byzantine–Sassanid War of 572–591: Emperor Justin II refuses to pay the annual tribute to Khosrau I, putting an end to the 50-year peace treaty established ten years earlier. The Armenians are considered allies to the Byzantine Empire, and Justin sends a Byzantine army into Persian territory, besieging the fortress city of Nisibis (modern Turkey).

==== Europe ====
- Siege of Pavia (569–572): King Alboin captures Ticinum (Pavia); after a siege the Byzantine garrison surrenders to the Lombards. The city is of strategic importance, lying at the rivers Po and Ticino, and becomes the capital of the Kingdom of the Lombards.
- June 28 – Alboin, king of the Lombards, is murdered at Verona in his palace, at the instigation of his wife Rosamund (daughter of the Gepid king Cunimund), and her henchman, Helmechis (the king's squire); both flee to seek Byzantine protection in Ravenna. Alboin is succeeded as king by Cleph, who is not related by blood.

==== Britain ====
- Theodric succeeds his brother Æthelric as king of Bernicia (southeastern Scotland). He rules until 579.

==== Asia ====
- Taspar Qaghan succeeds his brother Muqan Qaghan as ruler (khagan) of the Turkic Khaganate (Central Asia).
- Bidatsu succeeds his father Kinmei and ascends to the throne of Japan as the 30th emperor.

==== Mesoamerica ====
- Calakmul defeats Tikal, bringing an end to the First Tikal-Calakmul War.

== Births ==
- Chen Shuda, Chinese statesman
- Hovnan Mayravanetsi, Armenian philosopher

== Deaths ==
- June 28 – Alboin, king of the Lombards
- Æthelric of Bernicia, Scottish king
- Báetán mac Muirchertaig, High King of Ireland
- Corippus, Byzantine epic poet (approximate date)
- Eochaid mac Domnaill, High King of Ireland
- Hulü Guang, general of Northern Qi (b. 515)
- Liuva I, king of the Visigoths (or 571)
- Muqan Qaghan, ruler of the Göktürks
- Waldrada, Lombard princess (b. 531)
- Wei Shou, Chinese author (b. 506)
- Yuwen Hu, regent of Northern Zhou (b. 515)
- Sky Witness, ruler of Calakmul
