= Albsuinda =

Lombard princess (died after 572)

Albsuinda (or Alpsuinda) was the only child of Alboin, King of the Lombards in Pannonia (reigned c. 560 – 572), and his first wife Chlothsind, daughter of the Merovingian king of the Franks Chlothar (reigned 511 – 561). While still young Albsuinda had lost her mother shortly before the final clash in 567 with the people of the Gepids in Pannonia (modern Hungary), in which the Gepids were completely destroyed. After the victory her father had promptly remarried, taking as second wife Rosamund, daughter of the Gepid king Cunimund that Alboin had personally killed on the battlefield.

In 568 Alboin left Pannonia with his people to invade Byzantine-held Italy, most of which by 572 he had conquered. In the same year Albsuinda's stepmother Rosamund successfully connived to have Alboin killed in Verona. According to Paul the Deacon, following the assassination of her father she was carried still a child to Byzantine-held Ravenna by her stepmother Rosamund and the usurper Helmichis. They carried her there because as Alboin's only child she had considerable political value, since she could possibly become the link to transmit through a marriage dynastic rights to an eventual husband. Another reason for her presence with the fugitives was that she also served to guarantee the loyalty of the Lombard garrison of Verona that had followed Helmichis to Ravenna.

Shortly after having reached Ravenna, Rosamund and Helmichis killed each other. After that the highest Byzantine official in Italy, the Pretorian Prefect Longinus, sent her to Constantinople, the Empire's capital. Here the Byzantine diplomacy probably thought to use her as a political tool to impose on the Lombards a pro-Byzantine king, but nothing more is heard of her from the sources.
