= Sword of the Conqueror =

1961 Italian adventure film

- Directed by: Carlo Campogalliani
- Written by: Carlo Campogalliani; Paola Barbara; Alessandro Ferraù; Roberto Gianviti; Primo Zeglio
- Produced by: Gilberto Carbone
- Starring: Jack Palance; Eleonora Rossi Drago
- Cinematography: Angelo Baistrocchi; Raffaele Masciocchi
- Edited by: Mario Serandrei
- Music by: Carlo Rustichelli
- Production company: Titanus
- Distributed by: Titanus
- Release date: 1961
- Language: Italian

Sword of the Conqueror (Italian: Rosmunda e Alboino) is a 1961 Italian adventure film written and directed by Carlo Campogalliani and starring Jack Palance and Eleonora Rossi Drago.

== Plot ==
6th century warlord Alboin, king of the Lombards conquers the Christian territory of the Gepids after killing their king and taking his daughter and her infant son as hostages. Meanwhile, vengeful Rosamund and other Gepid survivors and their allies plot the fatal downfall of the Lombard king. To formally solidify his rule over the conquered Gepid people, Alboin intends to marry Rosamund. However, Rosamund is consumed with hatred for Alboin killing her father as well as her true love Helmichis who–although believed dead after a daring escape from Lombard soldiers–successfully rallies support to drive out the Lombards and kill their leaders.

The Gepids and their allies launch their attack on the wedding night between Alboin and Rosamund. Helmichis duels Alboin in the king's bedchamber but is disarmed by the warlord whose back is turned to his bride, who then fatally stabs him with a dagger. After a fierce battle within the dining court, the remaining Lombards surrender. Gepids and allied tribesmen hail Helmichis as the new king, until Alboin staggers into the court appearing utterly incredulous to Rosamund's betrayal. He finally dies at her feet and the people resume celebrating their newly won liberation from the Lombards' tyranny.

== Cast ==
- Jack Palance as Alboin
- Eleonora Rossi Drago as Rosamund
- Guy Madison as Helmichis
- Carlo D'Angelo as Falisque
- Edy Vessel as Matilda
- Andrea Bosic as King Cunimund
- Ivan Palance as Ulderico
- Vittorio Sanipoli as Wolfango
- Raf Baldassarre
- Guido Celano as Delfo
- Renato Mori
