= Chlothsind (queen) =

Frankish princess and queen consort

Chlothsind (fl. 560s) was a Frankish princess and the queen consort of the Lombard king Alboin. Her name may also be spelt Chlothsinda, Chlodosinda, Chlodosind, Chlodoswintha or Chlodosuinth.

Chlothsind was a daughter of the Frankish king Chlothar I and queen Ingund. She became the first wife of the Lombard king Alboin while the Lombards were still settled in Pannonia. According to Paul the Deacon, they had one child, Albsuinda. This marriage is also recorded in Gregory of Tours and the Origo gentis Langobardorum.

Bishop Nicetius of Trier addressed a letter to Chothsind. It was dispatched with returning Lombard ambassadors, but its date is unclear. It is usually dated to before 568, probably between 561 and 567. Nicetius expressed hope that she could induce her husband to convert to Catholicism rather than Arianism, just as her grandmother Chlothild helped convert Clovis I, Chlothar's father.

Chlothsind died not long after the Lombards began to settle in Italy in 568. After her death, Alboin married Rosimunda.

== Sources ==
- Barrett, Graham; Woudhuysen, George (2016). "Assembling the Austrasian Letters at Trier and Lorsch" (PDF). Early Medieval Europe. 24 (1): 3–57. doi:10.1111/emed.12132. S2CID 164122125.
- Marazzi, Federico (2021). "Byzantines and Lombards". In Salvatore Cosentino (ed.). A Companion to Byzantine Italy. Brill. pp. 169–199.
- Martindale, John R., ed. (1992). The Prosopography of the Later Roman Empire: Volume III, AD 527–641. Cambridge: Cambridge University Press. ISBN 0-521-20160-8.
- Tyrrell, V. Alice (2012). Merovingian Letters and Letter Writers (PDF) (PhD diss.). University of Toronto.
- Wood, Ian N. (1994). The Merovingian Kingdoms, 450–751. Harlow: Longman.
