= 571 =

Calendar year

571 in various calendars
- Gregorian calendar: 571; DLXXI
- Ab urbe condita: 1324
- Armenian calendar: 20; ԹՎ Ի
- Assyrian calendar: 5321
- Balinese saka calendar: 492–493
- Bengali calendar: −23 – −22
- Berber calendar: 1521
- Buddhist calendar: 1115
- Burmese calendar: −67
- Byzantine calendar: 6079–6080
- Chinese calendar: 庚寅年 (Metal Tiger); 3268 or 3061 — to — 辛卯年 (Metal Rabbit); 3269 or 3062
- Coptic calendar: 287–288
- Discordian calendar: 1737
- Ethiopian calendar: 563–564
- Hebrew calendar: 4331–4332
- Hindu calendars
- Vikram Samvat: 627–628
- Shaka Samvat: 492–493
- Kali Yuga: 3671–3672
- Holocene calendar: 10571
- Iranian calendar: 51 BP – 50 BP
- Islamic calendar: 53 BH – 52 BH
- Javanese calendar: 459–460
- Julian calendar: 571; DLXXI
- Korean calendar: 2904
- Minguo calendar: 1341 before ROC 民前1341年
- Nanakshahi calendar: −897
- Seleucid era: 882/883 AG
- Thai solar calendar: 1113–1114
- Tibetan calendar: ལྕགས་ཕོ་སྟག་ལོ་ (male Iron-Tiger); 697 or 316 or −456 — to — ལྕགས་མོ་ཡོས་ལོ་ (female Iron-Hare); 698 or 317 or −455

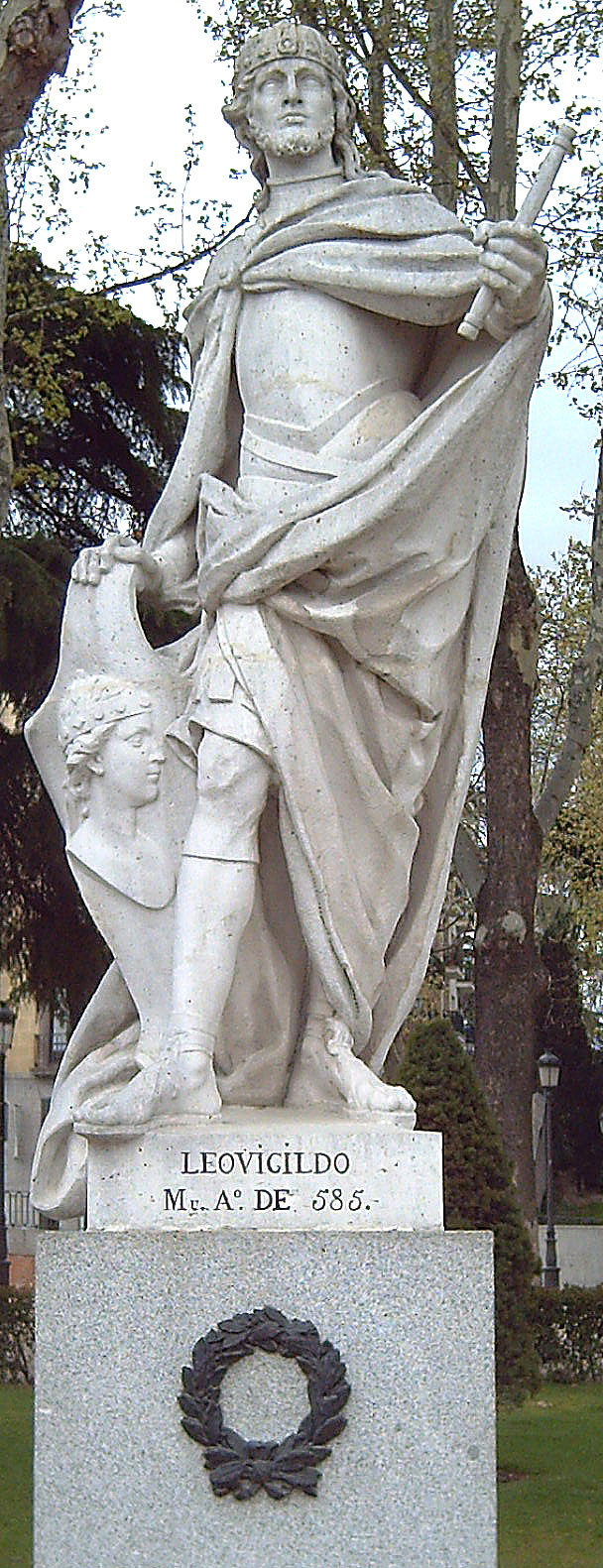
King Liuvigild (c. 525–586)

Year 571 (DLXXI) was a common year starting on Thursday of the Julian calendar. The denomination 571 for this year has been used since the early medieval period, when the Anno Domini calendar era became the prevalent method in Europe for naming years.

== Events ==
=== By place ===
==== Europe ====
- The Visigoths under King Liuvigild invade the Byzantine province of Spania (modern Andalusia), and seize the city of Córdoba. After the death of his brother Liuva I, he becomes sole ruler of the Visigothic Kingdom (approximate date).
- Benevento becomes the capital of an independent duchy, under the Lombard chieftain Zotto (approximate date).

==== Britain ====
- Battle of Bedcanford: The Anglo-Saxons under King Cuthwulf fight against the Britons, and conquer the settlements of Aylesbury, Benson, Eynsham and Limbury (according to the Anglo-Saxon Chronicle).
- Wuffa becomes the first king of East Anglia, as recorded in the Anglo-Saxon royal genealogies (approximate date).

=== By topic ===
==== Religion ====
- The Monophysites again reject the Council of Chalcedon, causing another schism.

== Births ==
- Muhammad, prophet of Islam (d. 632) – see also 570
- Li Jing, general and chancellor of the Tang dynasty (d. 649)
- Wang Gui, chancellor of the Tang dynasty (d. 639)
- Yang Jun, prince of the Sui dynasty (d. 600)

== Deaths ==
- April 15 – Kinmei, emperor of Japan (b. 509)
- November 29? – Brendan of Birr, Irish monastic saint
- Fall – killed in dynastic intrigue
  - Gao Yan, prince of Northern Qi (b. 558)
  - He Shikai, high official of Northern Qi (b. 524)
- Liuva I, king of the Visigoths (or 572)
- May 20 – Saint Yared, Axumite composer (b. 505)
- Narses dies at Domitian's palace in Rome.
