= Shield bearer =

Shield bearer usually refers to a Macedonian version of a heavy armored hoplite, whose tasks were protecting flanks of the sarrisa phalanx, and carrying a shield to protect other people in same ranks. A commander might be protected by several shield bearers. In combat, the shield bearers served as core of Macedonian army along with sarissa pike men, usually protecting flanks of the pike infantry. Other types of soldiers that made use of shield bearers included charioteers, archers, crossbowmen, and early handgunners.
