= Helmichis =

Italian regicide

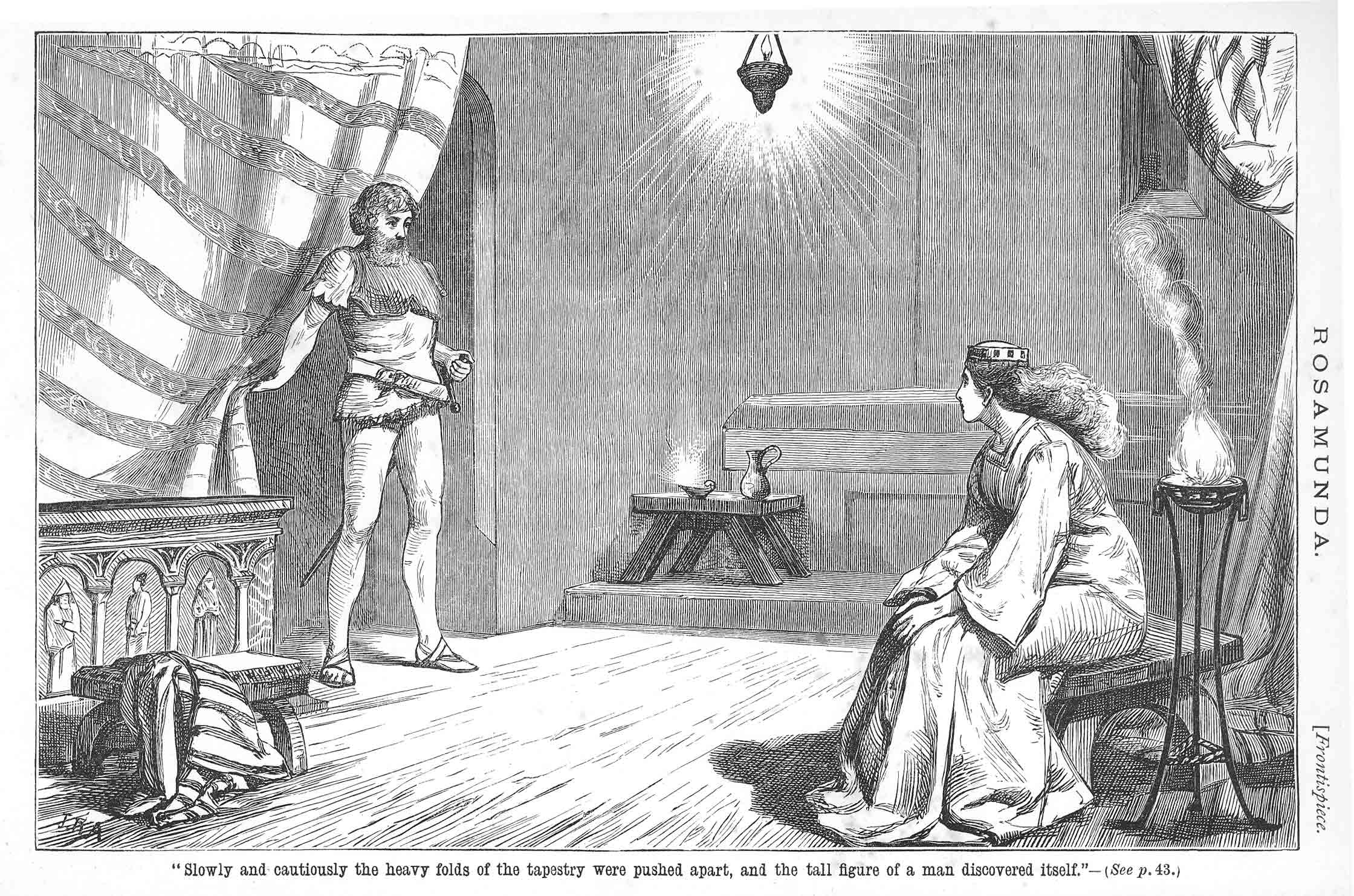
Helmichis discovering himself to Rosamund from Anna Kingsford's publication Rosamunda The Princess (1875)

Helmichis (fl. 572) was a Lombard noble who killed his king, Alboin, in 572 and unsuccessfully attempted to usurp his throne. Alboin's queen, Rosamund, supported or at least did not oppose Helmichis' plan to remove the king, and after the assassination Helmichis married her. The assassination was assisted by Peredeo, the king's chamber-guard, who in some sources becomes the material executer of the murder. Helmichis is first mentioned by the contemporary chronicler Marius of Avenches, but the most detailed account of his endeavours derives from Paul the Deacon's late 8th-century Historia Langobardorum.

The background to the assassination begins when Alboin killed the king of the Gepids in 567 and captured the king's daughter Rosamund. Alboin then led his people into Italy, and by 572 had settled himself in Verona, which made him vulnerable to the ambitions of other prominent Lombards, such as Helmichis, who was Alboin's foster-brother and arms-bearer. After Alboin's death, Helmichis attempted to gain the throne. He married Rosamund to legitimize his position as new king, but immediately faced stiff opposition from his fellow Lombards who suspected Helmichis of conniving with the Byzantines; this hostility eventually focused around the duke of Ticinum Cleph, supporter of an aggressive policy towards the Empire.

Rather than going to war, Helmichis, Rosamund and their followers escaped to Ravenna, the capital of Byzantine Italy, where they were received with full honours by the authorities. Once in Ravenna, Rosamund was persuaded by the Byzantine prefect Longinus to kill Helmichis in order to be free to marry him. Rosamund proceeded to poison Helmichis, but the latter, having understood what his wife had done to him, forced her to drink the cup too, so both of them died. After their deaths, Longinus dispatched Helmichis' forces to Constantinople, while the remaining Lombards had already found a new king in Cleph.

== Background ==
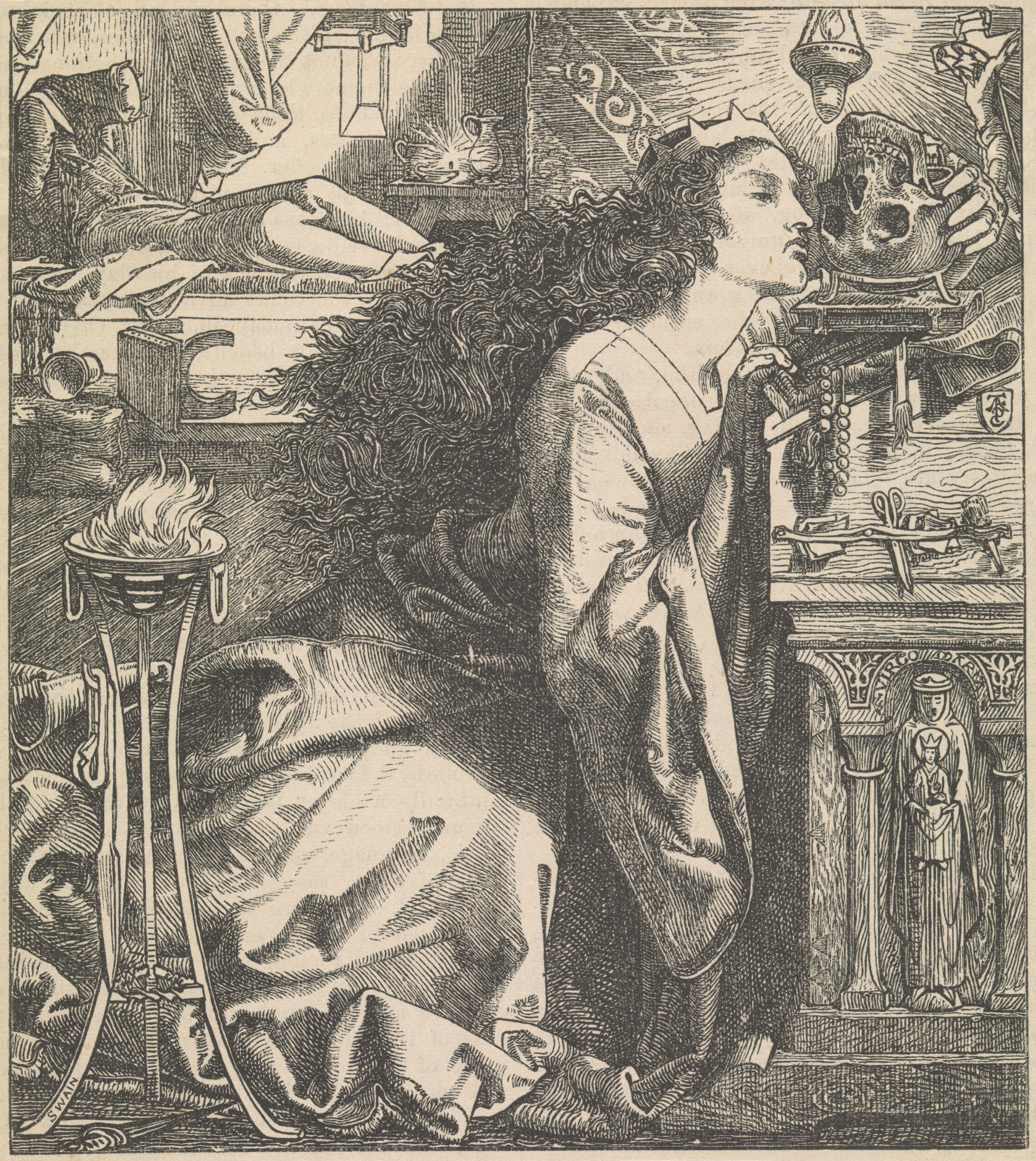
Rosamund, as viewed by the Pre-Raphaelite artist Frederick Sandys

The oldest author to write about Helmichis is the contemporary chronicler Marius of Avenches. In his account he mentions that "Alboin was killed by his followers, that is Hilmaegis with the rest, his wife agreeing to it". Marius continues by adding that, after killing the king, Helmichis married his widow and tried unsuccessfully to gain the throne. His attempt failed and he was forced to escape together with his wife, the royal treasure and the troops that had sided with him in the coup. This account has strong similarities with what is told in the Origo. The Origo would in its turn become a direct source for the Historia Langobardorum.

The background to the assassination begins when Alboin, king of the Lombards, a Germanic people living in Pannonia (in the region of modern Hungary), went to war against the neighbouring Gepids in 567. In a decisive battle, Alboin killed the Gepid king Cunimund and captured the king's daughter Rosamund – later marrying her to guarantee the loyalty of the surviving Gepids. The following year, the Lombards migrated to Italy, a territory then held by the Byzantine Empire. In 569 Alboin took Mediolanum (Milan), the capital of northern Italy, and by 570 he had assumed control of most of northern Italy. The Byzantine forces entrenched themselves in the strategic town of Ticinum (Pavia), which they took only after a long siege. Even before taking Ticinum, the Lombards crossed the Apennines and invaded Tuscia. After the fall of Ticinum, Alboin chose Verona as his first permanent headquarters. In this town Alboin was assassinated in 572 and it is in these circumstances that Helmichis' name is first heard of. Most of the available details are in the Historia Langobardorum.

== Assassination ==
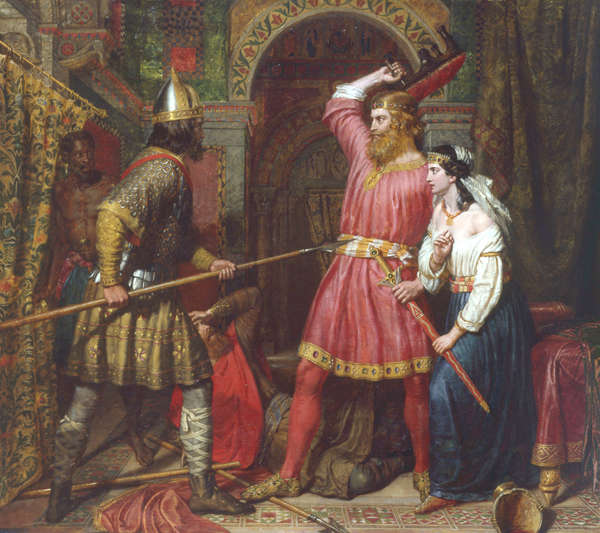
Alboin is killed by Peredeo while Rosamund steals his sword, in a 19th-century painting by Charles Landseer

By settling himself in Verona and temporarily interrupting his chain of conquests, Alboin had weakened his popular standing as a charismatic warrior king. The first to take advantage of this was Rosamund, who could count on the support of the Gepid warriors in the town in her search for an opportunity to avenge the death of her father. To obtain this goal she persuaded Helmichis, spatharius (arms bearer) and foster brother of the king, and also head of a personal armed retinue in Verona, to take part in a plot to eliminate Alboin and replace him on the throne. Helmichis persuaded Rosamund to involve Peredeo, described by Paul simply as "a very strong man", who was seduced through a trick by the Queen and forced to consent to become the actual assassin.

This story is partly in conflict with what is told by the Origo, which has Peredeo acting as an instigator and not as the murderer. In a similar vein to the Origo is the account of Peredeo contained in the Historia Langobardorum codicis Gothani, where it is added that Peredeo was Alboin's "chamber-guard", hinting that in the original version of the story Peredeo's role may just have been to let in the real assassin, who is Helmichis in Agnellus' account, as it had been in that of Marius. However, the primary intent of the Historia Langobardorum codicis Gothani may have been to obtain a more straightforward and coherent narrative by reducing the number of actors in the story, beginning with Peredeo. The disappearance of Peredeo, however, means that the role of Helmichis changes: while Paul presents him as "the efficient conspirator and killer", with Agnellus he is a victim of a ruthless and domineering queen.

According to historian Paolo Delogu it may be that Agnellus' narrative better reflects Lombard oral tradition than Paul's. In his interpretation, Paul's narrative represents a late distortion of the Germanic myths and rituals contained in the oral tradition. In a telling consistent with Germanic tradition, it would be Helmichis who was seduced by the queen, and by sleeping with him Rosamund would pass Alboin's royal charisma magically to the king's prospective murderer. A symbol of this passage of powers is found in Paul's account of the assassin's entry: Alboin's inability to draw his sword represents here his loss of power.

After the king's death on June 28, 572, Helmichis married Rosamund and claimed the Lombard throne in Verona. The marriage was important for Helmichis: it legitimized his rule because, judging from Lombard history, royal prerogatives could be inherited by marrying the king's widow; and the marriage was a guarantee for Helmichis of the loyalty of the Gepids in the army, who sided with the queen since she was Cunimund's daughter.

== Failure ==
"Helmegis then, upon the death of his king, attempted to usurp his kingdom, but he could not at all do this, because the Langobards, grieving greatly for the king's death, strove to make way with him. And straightway Rosemund sent word to Longinus, prefect of Ravenna, that he should quickly send a ship to fetch them. Longinus, delighted by such a message, speedily sent a ship in which Helmegis with Rosemund his wife embarked, fleeing at night."
Paul the Deacon
Historia Langobardorum, Book II, Ch. 29

Behind the coup were almost certainly the Byzantines, who had every interest in removing a dangerous enemy and replacing him with somebody, if not from a pro-Byzantine faction, at least less actively aggressive. Gian Piero Bognetti advances a few hypotheses about Helmichis' motivation for his coup: his reason could have involved a family link to the Lethings, the Lombard royal dynasty that had been dispossessed by Alboin's father Audoin; or he may have been related through Amalafrid to the Amali, the leading dynasty of the Goths. Helmichis easily obtained the support of the Lombards in Verona, and he probably hoped to sway all the warriors and Lombard dukes to his side by having Alboin's only child, Albsuinda, under his control. He may also have hoped for Byzantine help in buying the dukes' loyalty economically.

Helmichis' coup ultimately failed because it met strong opposition from the many Lombards who wanted to continue the war against the Byzantines and to confront the regicides. Faced with the prospect of going to war at overwhelming odds, Helmichis asked for help from the Byzantines. The praetorian prefect Longinus enabled him to avoid a land route possibly held by hostile forces, by shipping him instead down the Po to Byzantine-held Ravenna, together with his wife, his Lombard and Gepid troops, the royal treasure and Albsuinda. Bognetti believes that Longinus may have planned to make the Lombards weaker by depriving them of any legitimate heir. In addition, because of the ongoing war, it was hard to assemble all the warriors to elect a new king formally. This plan was brought to nothing by the troops stationed in Ticinum, who elected their duke Cleph king, having it in mind to continue Alboin's aggressive policy. In contrast, Wolfram argues that Cleph was elected in Ticinum while Helmichis was still making his bid for the crown in Verona.

== Death ==
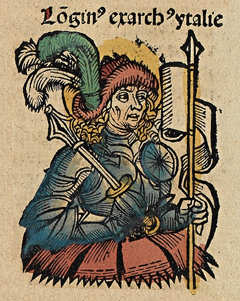
A miniature of Longinus, the Byzantine official said by Paul to be behind's Helmichis' death

Once in Ravenna, Helmichis and Rosamund rapidly became estranged. According to Paul, Longinus persuaded Rosamund to get rid of her husband so that he could marry her. To accomplish this, she made him drink a cup full of poison; before dying, however, Helmichis understood what his wife had done and forced her to drink the cup too, so they both died. According to Wolfram, there may be some historical truth in the account of Longinus' proposal to Rosamund, as it was possible to achieve Lombard kingship by marrying the queen, but the story of the two lovers' end is not historical but legendary. The mutual murder as told by Agnellus is given a different interpretation by Joaquin Martinez Pizarro: he sees Helmichis' last action as a symbol of how the natural hierarchy of sexes is at last restored, after the queen's actions had unnaturally modified the proper equilibrium.

At this point, Longinus sent the royal treasure and Albsuinda to Constantinople, the Empire's capital, together with Helmichis' forces, which were to become Byzantine mercenaries. This was a common Byzantine strategy, already applied previously to the Ostrogoths, by which large national contingents were relocated to be used in other theatres. These are believed to be the same 60,000 Lombards that are attested by John of Ephesus as being active in Syria in 575 against the Persians. As for Albsuinda, the Byzantine diplomacy probably aimed to use her as a political tool to impose a pro-Byzantine king on the Lombards. According to Agnellus, once Longinus' actions came to the attention of emperor Justin II they were greatly praised, and the emperor gave lavish gifts to his official.

Cleph kept his throne for only 18 months before being assassinated by a slave. An important success for the Byzantines was that no king was proclaimed to succeed him, opening a decade of interregnum and making the Lombards who remained in Italy more vulnerable to attacks from Franks and Byzantines. It was only when faced with the danger of annihilation by the Franks in 584 that the Lombard dukes elected a new king in the person of Authari, son of Cleph, who began the definitive consolidation and centralization of the Lombard kingdom.

== Early Middle Ages sources ==
Among the surviving Early Middle Ages sources, there are six that mention Helmichis by name. Of these, the only contemporary one is the Chronica of Marius of Avenches, written in the 580s. Marius was bishop of Aventicum, a town located in the western Alps in the Frankish Kingdom of Burgundy. Because of the small distance from Aventicum to the Italian peninsula, the chronicler had easy access to information regarding northern Italy. For this reason, historian Roger Collins considers the Chronica, though short, to be reliable on Italian matters. The remaining sources all come from Italy and were written in later centuries. Two of them were written in the 7th century, the Continuatio Havniensis Prosperi and the Origo Gentis Langobardorum, both anonymous. The Continuatio is a chronicle written around 625 that has reached us in a single manuscript. As its name suggests, it is a continuation of the 5th century chronicle of Prosper of Aquitaine. Derived in considerable measure from the Chronica Majora of Isidore of Seville, it blames the Romans for their inability to defend Italy from foreign invaders, and praises the Lombards for defending the country from the Franks. This is the earliest surviving work to name Rosamund, the queen of the Lombards who plays a central role in Helmichis' attested biography. The other 7th century work, the Origo, is a brief prose history of the Lombards that is essentially an annotated king list, although it begins with a description of the founding myth of the Lombard nation. Giorgio Ausenda believes that the Origo was written around 643 as a prologue to the Edictum Rothari, and continued to be updated till 671. According to Walter Pohl, the author's motives are mostly political: the Origo serves to consolidate the Lombards' national identity by emphasising a shared history. Apart from the origin myth, the only more detailed account is the one concerning the death of Alboin, and thus Helmichis.

For the events surrounding 572, the most exhaustive source available is Paul the Deacon's Historia Langobardorum, a history of the Lombard nation up to 744. The book was finished in the last two decades of the 8th century, after the Lombard Kingdom had been conquered by the Franks in 774. Because of the apparent presence in the work of many fragments preserved from Lombard oral tradition, Paul's work has been often interpreted as a tribute to a vanishing culture. Among these otherwise lost traditions stands the tale of Alboin's death. According to Herwig Wolfram, what Paul deals with is an example of how nationally vital events were personalized to make them easier to preserve in the collective memory. Even later than the Historia Langobardorum, but possibly using earlier lost sources, are the last two primary sources to speak about Helmichis: the anonymous Historia Langobardorum codicis Gothani and the Liber Pontificalis Ecclesiae Ravennatis written by Andreas Agnellus. The first is a brief Christianizing version of the Origo that was made in the first decade of the 9th century from a Carolingian point of view. The second was written in the 830s by a priest from Ravenna and is a history of the bishops who held the see of Ravenna through the ages. Agnellus' passage on Alboin and Rosamund is mostly derived from Paul and little else.
