= 515 =

Calendar year

515 in various calendars
- Gregorian calendar: 515; DXV
- Ab urbe condita: 1268
- Assyrian calendar: 5265
- Balinese saka calendar: 436–437
- Bengali calendar: −79 – −78
- Berber calendar: 1465
- Buddhist calendar: 1059
- Burmese calendar: −123
- Byzantine calendar: 6023–6024
- Chinese calendar: 甲午年 (Wood Horse); 3212 or 3005 — to — 乙未年 (Wood Goat); 3213 or 3006
- Coptic calendar: 231–232
- Discordian calendar: 1681
- Ethiopian calendar: 507–508
- Hebrew calendar: 4275–4276
- Hindu calendars
- Vikram Samvat: 571–572
- Shaka Samvat: 436–437
- Kali Yuga: 3615–3616
- Holocene calendar: 10515
- Iranian calendar: 107 BP – 106 BP
- Islamic calendar: 110 BH – 109 BH
- Javanese calendar: 402–403
- Julian calendar: 515; DXV
- Korean calendar: 2848
- Minguo calendar: 1397 before ROC 民前1397年
- Nanakshahi calendar: −953
- Seleucid era: 826/827 AG
- Thai solar calendar: 1057–1058
- Tibetan calendar: ཤིང་ཕོ་རྟ་ལོ་ (male Wood-Horse); 641 or 260 or −512 — to — ཤིང་མོ་ལུག་ལོ་ (female Wood-Sheep); 642 or 261 or −511

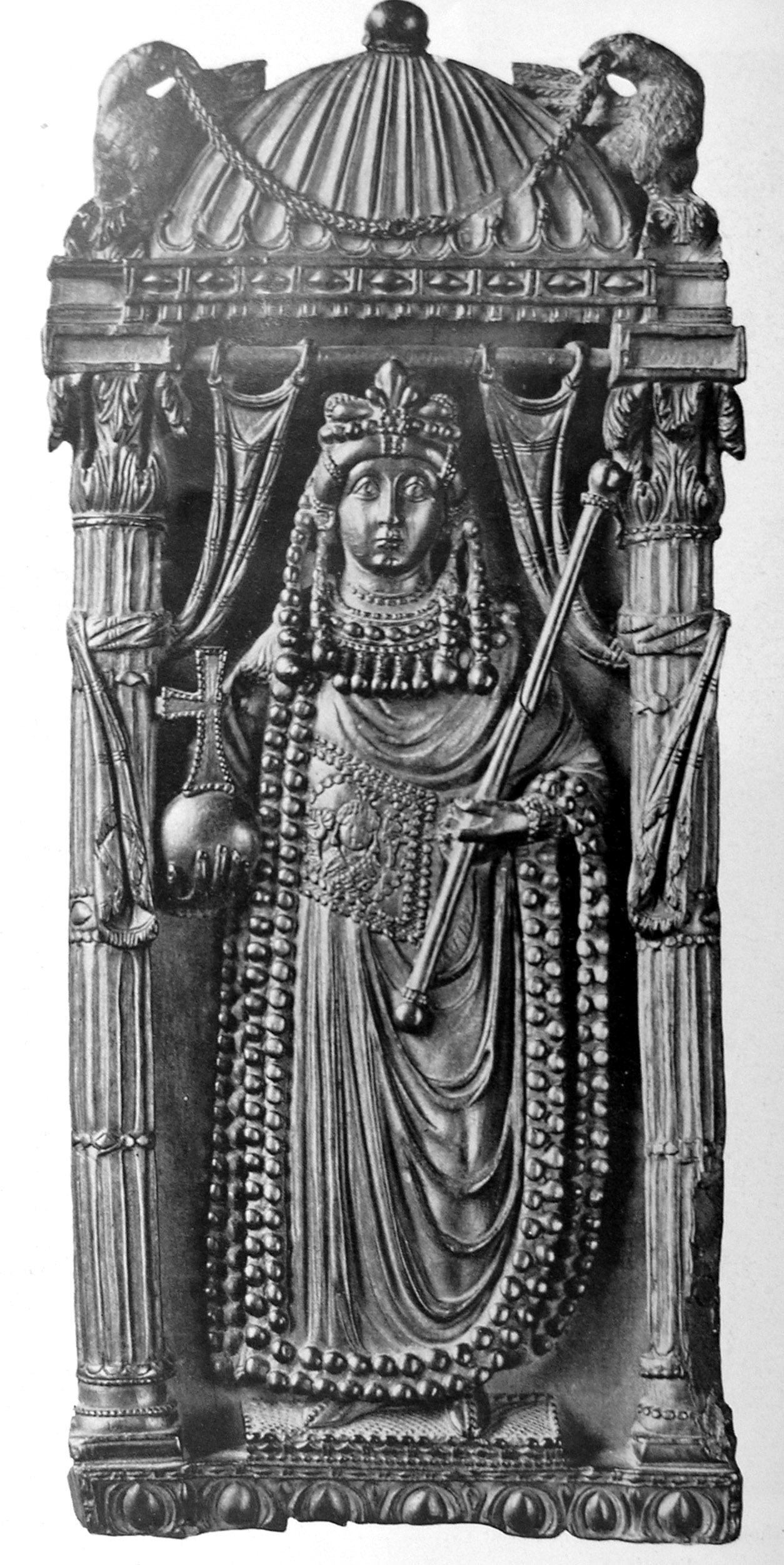
Empress Ariadne (c. 450–515)

Year 515 (DXV) was a common year starting on Thursday of the Julian calendar. At the time, it was known as the Year of the Consulship of Florentius and Anthemius (or, less frequently, year 1268 Ab urbe condita). The denomination 515 for this year has been used since the early medieval period, when the Anno Domini calendar era became the prevalent method in Europe for naming years.

== Events ==
=== By place ===
==== Byzantine Empire ====
- Autumn – Revolt of Vitalian: Byzantine general (magister militum) Vitalian mobilises his army, and marches again towards Constantinople. He captures the suburb of Sycae (modern Turkey) across the Golden Horn, and encamps there.
- Emperor Anastasius I gives Marinus, former praetorian prefect of the East, command over the Byzantine army. He defeats the rebel fleet at the harbor entrance, using a sulfur-based chemical substance, similar to the later Greek fire.
- Marinus lands with an army on the shore of Sycae and defeats the rebels. Disheartened by the losses suffered, Vitalian flees north under cover of the night.
- As a sign of his victory, Anastasius I leads a procession to Sosthenion, and attends a service of thanks at the local church dedicated to the Archangel Michael.
- Empress Ariadne, wife of Emperor Anastasius I, dies at Constantinople and is buried in the Church of the Holy Apostles.

==== Europe ====
- Amalasuintha, daughter of king Theodoric the Great, marries Eutharic, an Ostrogoth noble of the old Amal line.

=== By topic ===
==== Religion ====
- The St. Maurice's Abbey (Switzerland) is founded by Sigismund of Burgundy. He sets up five groups of monks to whom he entrusts the liturgy of the praise of God.

== Births ==
- Approximate date – Cainnech of Aghaboe, Irish abbot and saint (d. 600)
- Hulü Guang, general of Northern Qi (d. 572)
- Yuwen Hu, regent of Northern Zhou (d. 572)

== Deaths ==
- Ariadne, Byzantine empress
- Euphemius, patriarch of Constantinople
- Gao Zhao, high official of Northern Wei
- Xuan Wu Di, emperor of Northern Wei (b. 483)
