= 600 =

Calendar year

600 in various calendars
- Gregorian calendar: 600; DC
- Ab urbe condita: 1353
- Armenian calendar: 49; ԹՎ ԽԹ
- Assyrian calendar: 5350
- Balinese saka calendar: 521–522
- Bengali calendar: 6–7
- Berber calendar: 1550
- Buddhist calendar: 1144
- Burmese calendar: −38
- Byzantine calendar: 6108–6109
- Chinese calendar: 己未年 (Earth Goat); 3297 or 3090 — to — 庚申年 (Metal Monkey); 3298 or 3091
- Coptic calendar: 316–317
- Discordian calendar: 1766
- Ethiopian calendar: 592–593
- Hebrew calendar: 4360–4361
- Hindu calendars
- Vikram Samvat: 656–657
- Shaka Samvat: 521–522
- Kali Yuga: 3700–3701
- Holocene calendar: 10600
- Iranian calendar: 22 BP – 21 BP
- Islamic calendar: 23 BH – 22 BH
- Japanese calendar: N/A
- Javanese calendar: 489–490
- Julian calendar: 600; DC
- Korean calendar: 2933
- Minguo calendar: 1312 before ROC 民前1312年
- Nanakshahi calendar: −868
- Seleucid era: 911/912 AG
- Thai solar calendar: 1142–1143
- Tibetan calendar: ས་མོ་ལུག་ལོ་ (female Earth-Sheep); 726 or 345 or −427 — to — ལྕགས་ཕོ་སྤྲེ་ལོ་ (male Iron-Monkey); 727 or 346 or −426

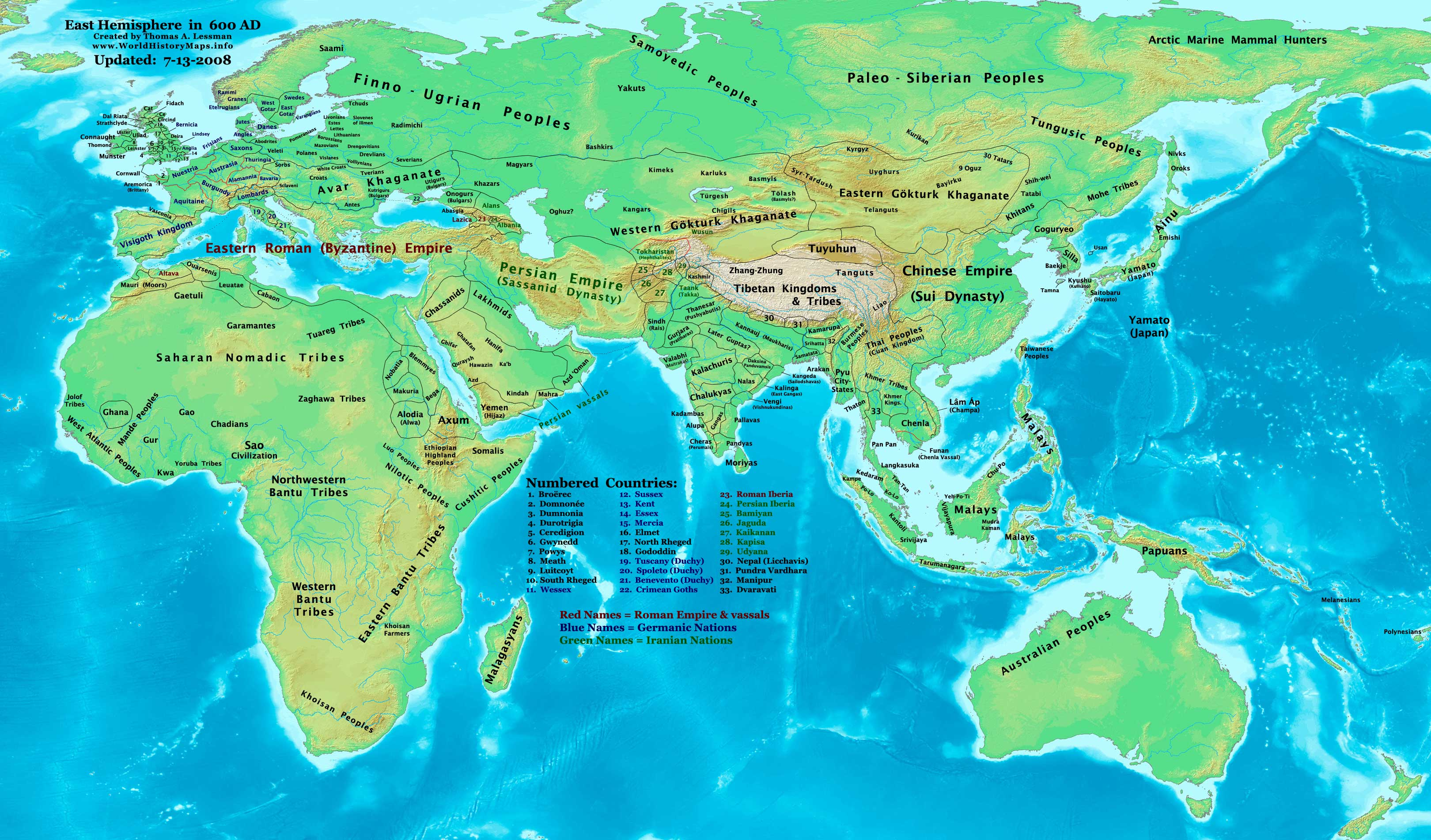
Eastern Hemisphere (600 AD)

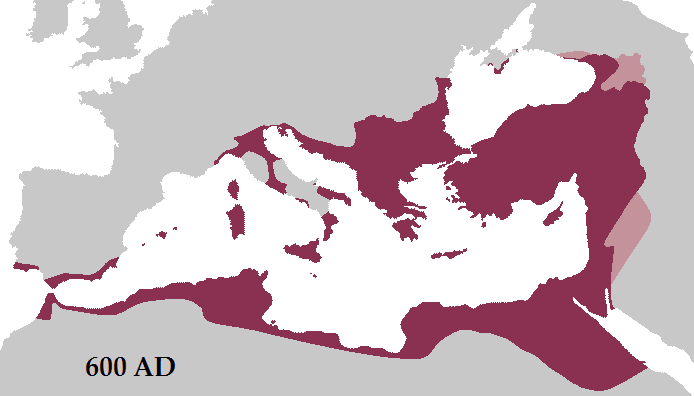
Byzantine Empire (600 AD)

Year 600 (DC) was a leap year starting on Friday of the Julian calendar. The denomination 600 for this year has been used since the early medieval period, when the Anno Domini calendar era became the prevalent method in Europe for naming years.

== Events ==
=== By place ===
==== Europe ====
- King Chlothar II of Neustria is defeated by his nephews, Theudebert II and Theuderic II, at Dormelles (approximate date).
- Germanic and Slavic peoples have tremendous population growth, with the Slavs colonizing the Balkan Peninsula.
- Rome continues as part of the Byzantine Empire. The Italian mainland is divided into independent cities and duchies.
- Venice continues as an independent realm, having been built up from fishing villages and settled by fugitives.
- Dorestad, lying in a fork between two branches of the Rhine, is established by the Franks as a trade center.
- King Agilulf of the Lombards and Queen Theodelinda build a palace complex at Monza, northeast of Milan.
- Moravians gain independence, by holding off the attacks from the Avars and the Franks who try to invade.
- According to the Ynglinga saga, king Ingvar Harra of Sweden invades Adalsysla (present day Lääne County in Estonia), but is killed by the locals (approximate date).
- Smallpox arrives in Western Europe for the first time (approximate date).

==== Britain ====
- The Welsh bard, Prince Aneirin of the Pennines (North West of England), writes the poem, "Y Gododdin", recording the events of the Battle of Catraeth.
- The Britons of Strathclyde (Scotland), Wales, and Cornwall are all separated by the Anglo-Saxon kingdoms.

==== Asia ====
- The first of the Japanese embassies to Imperial China is sent (approximate date).
- The Persians begin to use windmills for irrigation (approximate date).
- Namri Songtsen becomes the new king of Tibet (approximate date).
- Chaturanga is played in its current form in India (approximate date).
- Yangdi, a Sui emperor, extends the Grand Canal. He reportedly assumes power by poisoning his father. Ma Shu-mou, aka Mahu, was one of the canal overseers and was said to have eaten a steamed 2-year-old child each day he worked on the canal. On completion the canal extended for 1,100 miles. 5.5 million people were pressed into service to complete the 1,550 mile canal.
- Quill pens, made from the outer feathers of crows and other large birds, became popular. The first books are printed in China.
- The oldest inscription in Mon language dated from 600 AD. later found at Wat Phorang, Thailand.
- Mu becomes king of the Korean kingdom of Baekje.

==== Meso- and South America ====
- Loma Caldera (El Salvador) erupts, burying the Maya village of Joya de Cerén (approximate date).
- The Hopewell tradition (North America) ceases to be the dominant culture (approximate date).
- Moche culture ends in the Andes (approximate date).
- Nazca culture ends in the Andes (approximate date).
- The Wari Empire is established in The Andes (approximate date)
- The Middle Horizon period starts in the Andes.

==== Pacific Ocean ====
- Early settlers from the Marquesas build the Alakoko fishpond and taro fields on Kauai, Hawaii.

=== By topic ===
==== Arts and sciences ====
- The Germanic peoples, due to the more abundant food supply available, use the "moldboard" plow, introduced by the Slavs in Eastern Europe. The plow works the land with horses and oxen.
- Possibly the first reference to chess is made in the Persian work Karnamak-i-Artakhshatr-i-Papakan.
- 600-750 - Maguey Bloodletting Ritual, fragment of a fresco from Teotihuacan, Mexico, is made. Teotihuacan culture. It is now kept at the Cleveland Museum of Art.
- 600-900 - Palace and Temple of the Inscriptions (tomb-pyramid of K'inich Janaab' Pakal), Palenque, Mexico, are built. Maya culture.
- 600-900 - Cylindrical vessel is made. Maya culture. It is now kept at the Princeton University Art Museum, New Jersey.
- The Navigatio Sancti Brendani Abbatis (Voyage of St. Brendan the Abbott) recounts a 7-year trip to a land across the sea by the Irish saint and a band of acolytes about this time.

==== Religion ====
- Irish missionaries preach in Scotland and Germany (approximate date).
- Chinese-influenced sculptures of Buddha begin to be created in Japan.
- Sumatra, Java, and the surrounding islands are converted to Buddhism.
- Augustine of Canterbury converts Æthelberht of Kent to Christianity (approximate date).
- Nubian rulers become Christian (approximate date).

==== World ====
- The population of the Earth rises to about 208 million people (approximate date).

== Births ==
- September 11 – Yuknoom the Great a Maya ruler of Calakmul
- Ali ibn Abi Talib, Muslim caliph and Shī‘ah imām (approximate date)
- Audomar, bishop of Thérouanne (approximate date)
- Bhāskara I, Indian mathematician (approximate date)
- Birinus, bishop of Dorchester (approximate date)
- Candrakīrti, Indian Madhyamaka philosopher
- Cunibert, bishop of Cologne (approximate date)
- Judoc, Breton noble and Catholic saint (d. 668)
- Li Shimin, son of Chinese General Li Yuan (the Duke of Tang)
- Remaclus, bishop of Maastricht (approximate date)
- Wandregisel, Frankish monk and abbot (approximate date)
- Yan Liben, Chinese painter (approximate date)

== Deaths ==
- March 13 - Leander, bishop of Seville possibly in 601)
- Aedh Buidhe, king of Uí Maine (Ireland)
- Beop, king of Baekje (Korea)
- Bhavavarman I, king of Cambodia
- Cainnech of Aghaboe, Irish abbot and saint (b. c.515)
- Uatu mac Áedo, king of Connacht (Ireland)
- Venantius Fortunatus, bishop of Poitiers, one of the last representatives of Classical Latin poetry
- Yang Jun, prince of the Sui dynasty (b. 571)
