= 506 =

Calendar year

506 in various calendars
- Gregorian calendar: 506; DVI
- Ab urbe condita: 1259
- Assyrian calendar: 5256
- Balinese saka calendar: 427–428
- Bengali calendar: −88 – −87
- Berber calendar: 1456
- Buddhist calendar: 1050
- Burmese calendar: −132
- Byzantine calendar: 6014–6015
- Chinese calendar: 乙酉年 (Wood Rooster); 3203 or 2996 — to — 丙戌年 (Fire Dog); 3204 or 2997
- Coptic calendar: 222–223
- Discordian calendar: 1672
- Ethiopian calendar: 498–499
- Hebrew calendar: 4266–4267
- Hindu calendars
- Vikram Samvat: 562–563
- Shaka Samvat: 427–428
- Kali Yuga: 3606–3607
- Holocene calendar: 10506
- Iranian calendar: 116 BP – 115 BP
- Islamic calendar: 120 BH – 119 BH
- Javanese calendar: 392–393
- Julian calendar: 506; DVI
- Korean calendar: 2839
- Minguo calendar: 1406 before ROC 民前1406年
- Nanakshahi calendar: −962
- Seleucid era: 817/818 AG
- Thai solar calendar: 1048–1049
- Tibetan calendar: ཤིང་མོ་བྱ་ལོ་ (female Wood-Bird); 632 or 251 or −521 — to — མེ་ཕོ་ཁྱི་ལོ་ (male Fire-Dog); 633 or 252 or −520

Year 506 (DVI) was a common year starting on Sunday of the Julian calendar. At the time, it was known as the Year of the Consulship of Messala and Dagalaiphus (or, less frequently, year 1259 Ab urbe condita). The denomination 506 for this year has been used since the early medieval period, when the Anno Domini calendar era became the prevalent method in Europe for naming years.

== Events ==
=== By place ===
==== Byzantine Empire ====
- November – Emperor Anastasius I accepts a peace agreement with the Sasanian Empire (Persia), based on the status quo. He upgrades the fortifications at Batnae, Edessa and Amida (Northern Mesopotamia).

==== Europe ====
- February 2 – King Alaric II issues the "Lex Romana Visigothorum" or Breviary of Alaric, an abstract of Roman laws and imperial decrees, compiled by a commission appointed to provide a law code for Alaric's Roman subjects. The "Lex Romana" will be the standard for justice in the Visigothic realm.
- The Visigoths capture the city of Dertosa in Catalonia. They arrest and execute the Roman usurper Peter, sending his head as a trophy to Zaragoza (Spain).

=== By topic ===
==== Religion ====
- September 10 – Council of Agde: The bishops of Visigothic Gaul under the presidency of Caesarius of Arles meet.
- Antipope Laurentius is persuaded by Theodoric the Great to resign his claim to the throne of Pope Symmachus, ending a schism in the Catholic Church; Laurentius then fasts until his death.

== Births ==
- Soga no Iname, leader of the Soga clan (d. 570)
- Wei Shou, Chinese author (d. 572)
- Zhang Yao'er, empress of Chen dynasty China (d. 570)

== Deaths ==
- Buretsu, emperor of Japan
- Peter, Roman usurper in Spain
