= Byzantine diplomacy =

Foreign administration of the Byzantine Empire

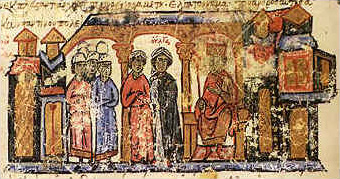
Olga, ruler of the Kievan Rus', along with her escort in Constantinople (Madrid Skylitzes, Biblioteca Nacional de España, Madrid)

Modern depiction of the reception of the ambassadors of Emperor Constans II at the court of Tang Taizong at Chang'an, 643 CE

Historian Dimitri Obolensky asserts that the preservation of civilization in Southern Europe was due to the skill and resourcefulness of the diplomacy of the Byzantine Empire, which remains one of Byzantium's lasting contributions to the history of Europe and the Middle East.

== Challenges and goals ==
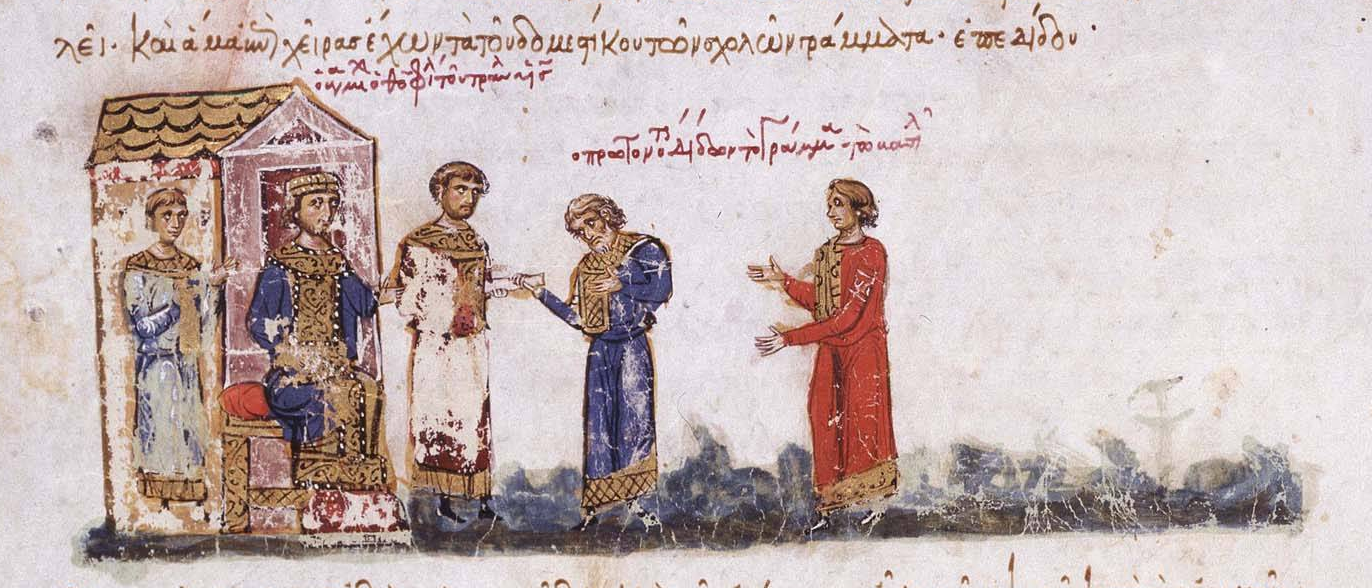
Emperor Michael III receives a message.

After the fall of the Western Roman Empire, the key challenge to the Eastern Roman Empire was to maintain a set of relations between itself and its sundry neighbors, including the Persians, Georgians, Iberians, the Germanic peoples, the Bulgars, the Slavs, the Armenians, the Huns, the Avars, the Franks, the Lombards, and the Arabs, that embodied and so maintained its imperial status. All these neighbors lacked a key resource that Byzantium had taken over from Rome, namely a formalized legal structure. When they set about forging formal political institutions, they were dependent on the empire. Whereas classical writers are fond of making a sharp distinction between peace and war, for the Byzantines diplomacy was a form of war by other means. Anticipating Niccolò Machiavelli and Carl von Clausewitz, Byzantine historian John Kinnamos writes, "Since many and various matters lead toward one end, victory, it is a matter of indifference which one uses to reach it." With a regular army of 120,000-140,000 men after the losses of the seventh century, the empire's security depended on activist diplomacy.

Byzantium's "Bureau of Barbarians" was the first foreign intelligence agency, gathering information on the empire’s rivals from every imaginable source. While on the surface a protocol office—its main duty was to ensure foreign envoys were properly cared for and received sufficient state funds for their maintenance, and it kept all the official translators—it clearly had a security function as well. On Strategy, from the 6th century, offers advice about foreign embassies: "[Envoys] who are sent to us should be received honourably and generously, for everyone holds envoys in high esteem. Their attendants, however, should be kept under surveillance to keep them from obtaining any information by asking questions of our people."

== Principles and methods ==
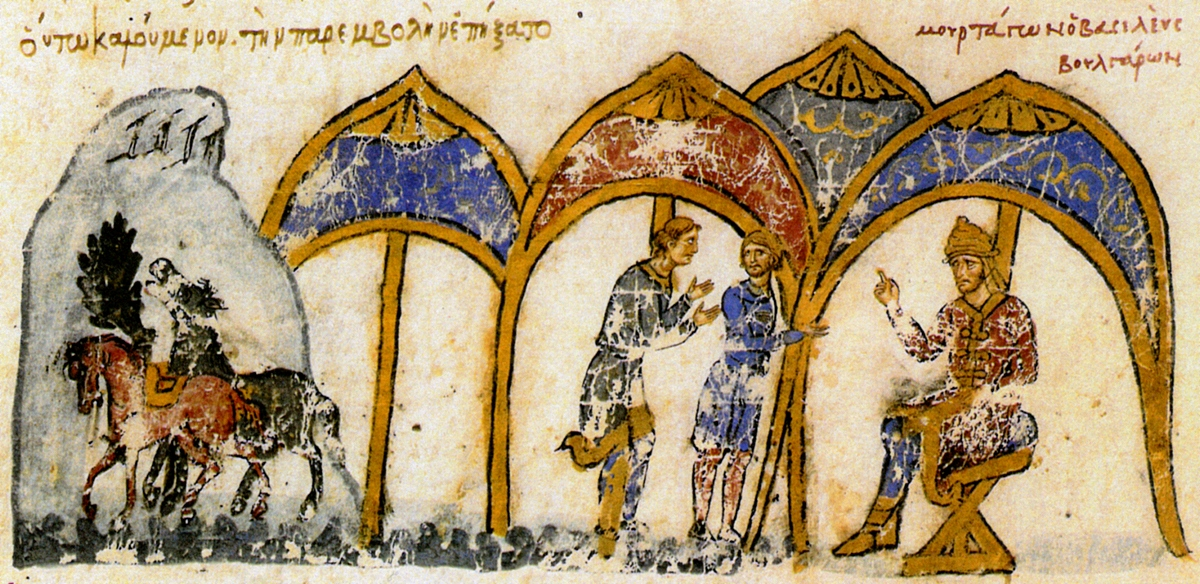
Omurtag, ruler of Bulgaria, sends delegation to Byzantine emperor Michael II (Madrid Skylitzes, Biblioteca Nacional de España, Madrid).

Byzantine diplomacy drew its neighbors into a network of international and interstate relations, controlled by the empire itself. This process revolved around treaty making. Byzantine historian Evangelos Chrysos postulates a three-layered process at work: 1) the new ruler was welcomed into the family of kings, 2) there was an assimilation of Byzantine social attitudes and values, 3) as a formalization of the second layer of the process, there were laws.

In order to drive this process, the Byzantines availed themselves of a number of mostly diplomatic practices. For example, embassies to Constantinople would often stay on for years. A member of other royal houses would routinely be requested to stay in Constantinople, not only as a potential hostage, but also as a useful pawn in case political conditions where he came from changed. Another key practice was to overwhelm visitors by sumptuous displays. Constantinople's riches served the state's diplomatic purposes as a means of propaganda, and as a way to impress foreigners. When Liutprand of Cremona was sent as an ambassador to the Byzantine capital, he was overwhelmed by the imperial residence, the luxurious meals, and acrobatic entertainment. Special care was taken to stimulate as many of the senses in as high degree as possible: brightly lit things to see, terrifying sounds, tasty food; even the diplomatic set-piece of having barbarians standing around the throne wearing their native gear.

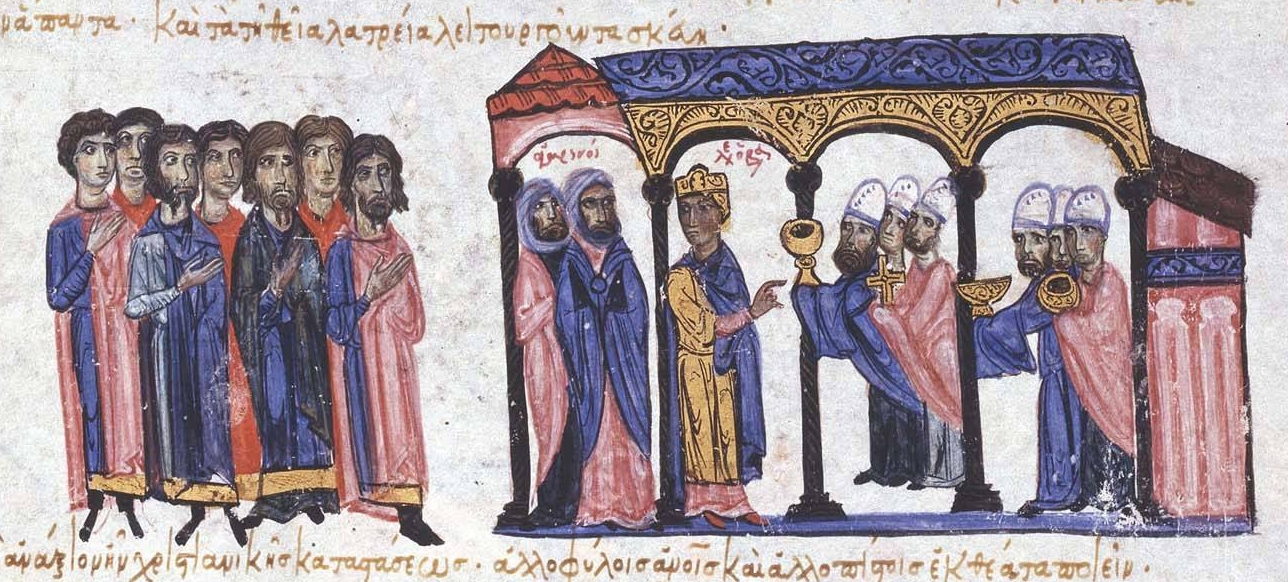
Emperor Leo VI shows the riches of the Hagia Sophia to the Arab ambassadors

The fact that Byzantium in its dealings with the barbarians generally preferred diplomacy to war is not surprising. For the East Romans, faced with the ever-present necessity of having to battle on two fronts — in the east against Persians, Arabs and Turks, in the north against the Slavs and the steppe nomads — knew from personal experience how expensive war is both in money and manpower. As such, the Byzantines were willing to pay tribute and bribes to foreign nations in order to dissuade them from invading the empire or breaking the peace between the nations.The Byzantines were skilled at using diplomacy as a weapon of war. If the Bulgars threatened, subsidies could be given to the Kievan Rus. A Rus threat could be countered by subsidies to the Patzinaks. If the Patzinaks proved troublesome, the Cumans or Uzès could be contacted. There was always someone to the enemy’s rear in a position to appreciate the emperor's largesse.

This strategy could be seen in practice during the Rus Prince Svyatoslav's invasion of Bulgaria in 967, during which the emperor John Tzimiskes manipulated the Rus, Bulgars, Patzinaks, Magyars, and Avars individually against each other, ultimately weakening and neutralizing such groups who were previously threats to Constantinople.

Another innovative principle of Byzantine diplomacy was effective interference in the internal affairs of other states. In 1282, Michael VIII sponsored a revolt in Sicily against Charles of Anjou called the Sicilian Vespers. Emperor Heraclius once intercepted a message from Persian rival Khosrau II which ordered the execution of a general. Heraclius added 400 names to the message and diverted the messenger, provoking a rebellion by those on the list. The emperor maintained a stable of pretenders to almost every foreign throne. These could be given funds and released to wreak havoc if their homeland threatened attack.

== See also ==
- De Administrando Imperio

== Sources ==
- Antonucci, Michael (February 1993). "War by Other Means: The Legacy of Byzantium". History Today. 43 (2).
- Chrysos, Evangelos K. (1992). "Byzantine diplomacy, A.D. 300-800: means and ends". In Shepard, Jonathan; Franklin, Simon (eds.). Byzantine Diplomacy: Papers from the Twenty-Fourth Spring Symposium of Byzantine Studies, Cambridge, March 1990. Aldershot, England: Variorium. pp. 25–39. ISBN 0860783383.
- Dennis, George T. (1985). Three Byzantine Military Treatises. Washington, District of Columbia: Dumbarton Oaks, Research Library and Collection. ISBN 9780884021407.
- Gabriel, Richard A. (2002). The Great Armies of Antiquity. Westport, Connecticut: Greenwood Publishing Group. ISBN 0-275-97809-5.
- Haldon, John (1999). Warfare, State and Society in the Byzantine World, 565–1204. London: UCL Press. ISBN 1-85728-495-X.
- Kazhdan, Alexander P. (1992). "The notion of Byzantine diplomacy". In Shepard, Jonathan; Franklin, Simon (eds.). Byzantine Diplomacy: Papers from the Twenty-Fourth Spring Symposium of Byzantine Studies, Cambridge, March 1990. Aldershot, England: Variorium. pp. 3–21. ISBN 0860783383.
- Laiou, Angeliki E. (2002). The Economic History of Byzantium: From the Seventh through the Fifteenth Century. Washington, District of Columbia: Dumbarton Oaks Research Library and Collection. ISBN 0-88402-288-9.
- Neumann, Iver B. (August 2005). "Sublime Diplomacy: Byzantine, Early Modern, Contemporary" (PDF). Millennium: Journal of International Studies. 34 (3). Netherlands Institute of International Relations 'Clingendael': 865–888. doi:10.1177/03058298060340030201. ISSN 1569-2981. S2CID 144773343. Archived from the original (PDF) on 2017-08-08.
- Obolensky, Dimitri (1974) [1971]. The Byzantine Commonwealth: Eastern Europe, 500-1453. London: Cardinal. ISBN 9780351176449.
- Obolensky, Dimitri (1994). Byzantium and the Slavs. Crestwood, New York: St Vladimir's Seminary Press. ISBN 0-88141-008-X.
- Oikonomidès, Nicolas A. (1992). "Byzantine diplomacy, A.D. 1204-1453: means and ends". In Shepard, Jonathan; Franklin, Simon (eds.). Byzantine Diplomacy: Papers from the Twenty-Fourth Spring Symposium of Byzantine Studies, Cambridge, March 1990. Aldershot, England: Variorium. pp. 73–88. ISBN 0860783383.
- Shepard, Jonathan (1992). "Byzantine diplomacy, A.D. 800-1204: means and ends". In Shepard, Jonathan; Franklin, Simon (eds.). Byzantine Diplomacy: Papers from the Twenty-Fourth Spring Symposium of Byzantine Studies, Cambridge, March 1990. Aldershot, England: Variorium. pp. 41–71. ISBN 0860783383.
