= Rosamund (queen) =

Sixth-century Lombard queen

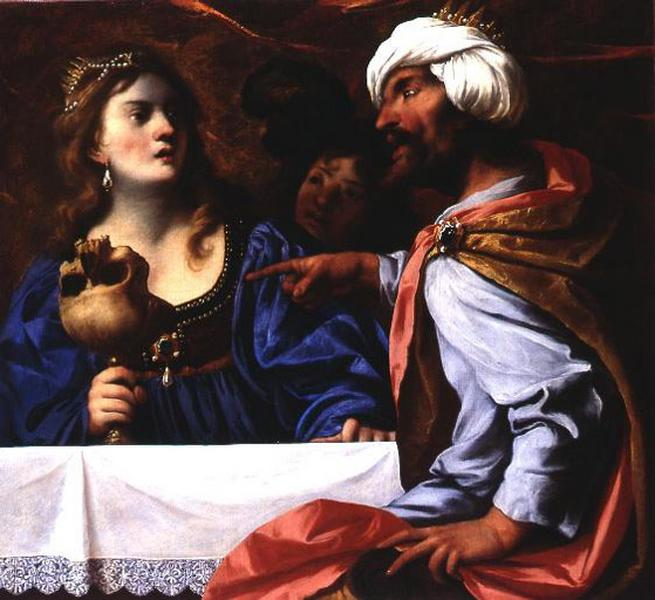
- Rosamund forced to drink from the skull of her father, a painting by Pietro della Vecchia

Queen consort of the Lombards
- Tenure: 567 – 28 June 572/573
- Born: 540
- Died: 572 or 573; Ravenna
- Spouse: Alboin; Helmichis
- Father: Cunimund

Rosamund (fl. 572) was a Lombard queen. She was the daughter of Cunimund, king of the Gepids, and wife of Alboin, king of the Lombards.

== Life ==
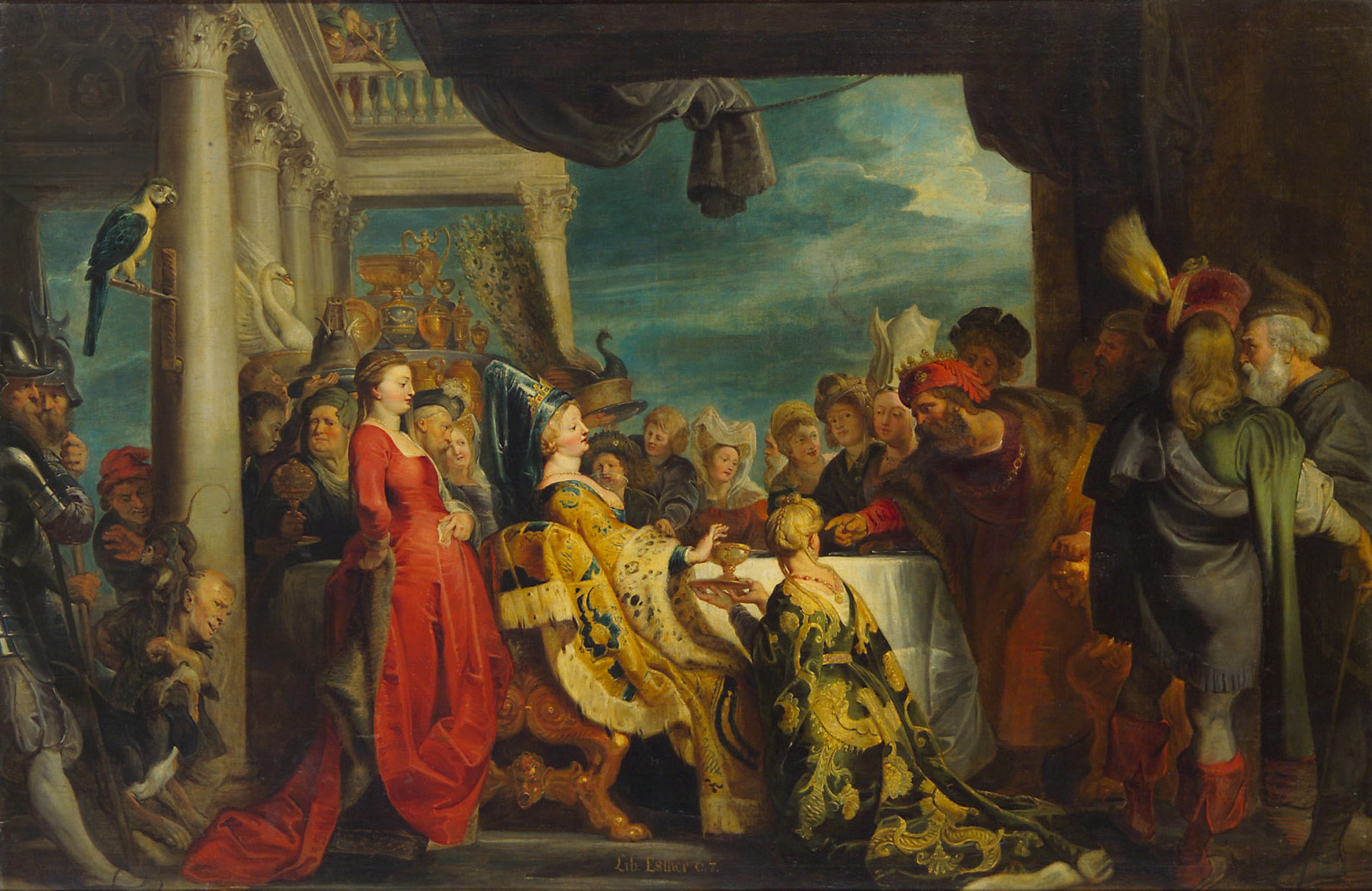
Alboin and Rosamund, (workshop of Rubens)

Rosamund was born into a kingdom in crisis, as the Gepid people had been fighting a losing battle against the Lombards since 546, firstly within the context of a Lombardic–East Roman alliance, and later against the Lombards and the Avar nomads. These wars had taken the lives of not only her grandfather, King Thurisind, but also her uncle, Thurismund, both of whom served to establish a long-standing hatred of the Lombards in her father, Cunimund, which he passed down to her.

This hatred was what spawned the final war of the Gepids, as Cunimund attempted to win back lost lands against the Lombards. The war quickly turned and in 567, the Gepid Kingdom would be completely subdued by a mixture of Lombard and Avar forces. Her father was decapitated, and she, along with many other Gepids, was taken as a prisoner of the Lombards (see Lombard–Gepid War (567)). However, in an attempt to secure a male heir and following the death of his first wife Chlothsind, Alboin took her as his wife. Alboin was noted for his cruelty towards her; his most famous act of cruelty was reported by Paulus Diaconus, who states that at a royal banquet in Verona, Alboin forced her to drink from the skull of her dead father (which he carried around his belt), inviting her "to drink merrily with her father".

After this, she began plotting to have her husband assassinated. Thus, Rosamund met with the king's arms bearer and her lover, Helmichis, who suggested using Peredeo, "a very strong man", to accomplish the assassination. Peredeo refused to help, and that night mistakenly had intercourse with Rosamund, who was disguised as a servant. After learning that he had committed adultery with his king's wife, Peredeo agreed to take part in an assassination attempt in fear of the king's retribution. After the great feast, Alboin went to bed inebriated, at which point Rosamund ordered the king's sword bound to his bedpost, so that should he wake in the middle of the assassination attempt, he would be defenceless. Alboin did wake, only to find himself unarmed. He fended off his attackers temporarily with a footstool but was killed. Due in part to the work of Paulus Diaconus, there seems to be some confusion about who actually killed Alboin, with both Helmichis and Peredeo assigned as the sole murderer.

Immediately afterwards, Helmichis planned to marry Rosamund and usurp the throne by claiming kingship. However, this plan gained little support from the various duchies of the Lombard kingdom, so Rosamund sent word to a prefect of Ravenna, Longinus, to send a ship for herself, Helmichis, and Albsuinda, Alboin's daughter by his first wife, to flee. They fled together to the East Roman stronghold of Ravenna with a large proportion of Alboin's private treasures. Rosamund and Helmichis married in Ravenna, but were soon divided when Rosamund, in an attempt to curry favour, took as a lover Longinus, the exarch, who had helped them plan the murder of Alboin. At the urging of Longinus, who promised to marry her, she attempted to murder her former lover Helmichis by poisoning, handing him the drink after he had washed;, she was instead murdered by Helmichis, who forced her to drink the poison before committing suicide by the same means.

== In later culture ==
She is a heroine of Boccaccio's De casibus virorum illustrium (book 8).

Medieval folk tales and legends developed. The first true tragedy, Giovanni Rucellai's Rosmunda, was first performed in 1525 and was the basis for Vittorio Alfieri's 1783 work of the same name. The conspiracy to murder Alboin also inspired the 1961/2 film Rosmunda e Alboino, aka Sword of the Conqueror etc., by Carlo Campogalliani.

In 1665, Urban Hjärne wrote a comedy in Swedish on the same matter, Rosimunda. It is the first original play in that language known to have actually been staged, as entertainment for the young Charles XI while he studied at Uppsala University.

The English pre-Raphaelite poet Algernon Charles Swinburne wrote an 1899 work, Rosamund, Queen of the Lombards.

== See also ==
- Cleopatra VII
- Theodora
