= Cunimund =

- King of the Gepids
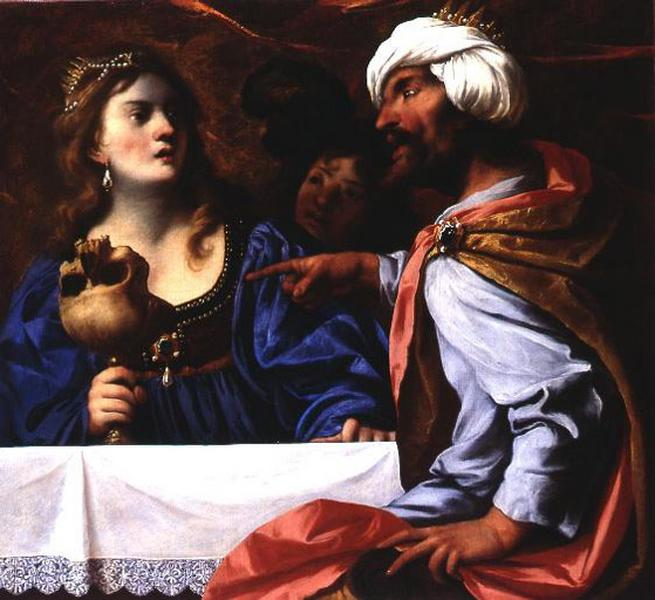
- Rosamund forced to drink from the skull of her father by Pietro della Vecchia (c.1650–1660)
- Reign: c.560–567
- Predecessor: Thurisind
- Successor: none
- Died: 567
- Issue: Rosamund
- Father: Thurisind

Cunimund (died 567) was the last king of the Gepids, falling in the Lombard–Gepid War (567) against the Lombards and Pannonian Avars.

== War with the Lombards ==
=== Background ===
The Gepids had held the important city of Sirmium (now Sremska Mitrovica, Serbia) since 536, after taking it from the Byzantine emperor Justinian I. By 549, the Gepids were at war with the Lombards. The Lombards requested and received help from Justinian I in the form of 15,000 troops. This was a relatively large force, and the Gepids quickly came to a truce with the Lombards, but only while the Byzantine soldiers were in the area. There was, more or less, a long feud between the peoples of Thurisind and Audoin, then king of the Lombards.

=== Rule ===
Cunimund succeeded Thurisind as king. According to multiple sources, the former king had been Cunimund's own father, and the enmity that both had for the Lombards was allegedly partly a result of Alboin's murder of Cunimund's brother (Thurisind's son), Turismod.

Open war with the Lombards, now led by Alboin, began again in 565. Cunimund appealed to the new Byzantine emperor, Justin II, for help, promising Sirmium in return. Justin accepted, and the Gepids had a temporary advantage, even though Cunimund failed to release Sirmium after all.

The Lombards later formed an alliance with the Avars. Cunimund made the same offer to Justin II as he had before, and this time, when Justin accepted, the Gepid king handed Sirmium over to the Byzantines. As it turned out, however, the Byzantine troops neglected to join the Gepids in their fight but kept Sirmium, and although the Avars did not show up either, the Lombards soundly defeated Cunimund's forces in 567. According to the writings of Paul the Deacon, Alboin killed the defeated king and had his skull converted into a drinking cup known as a scala or patera. But, the Lombards were forced to go to Italy by the Avars in 568. Thus, territories of the Gepid Kingdom were ruled by them.

After the Gepids’ defeat, Alboin forced Cunimund’s daughter Rosamund into marrying him. Paul the Deacon reports that, during a feast in Verona, Alboin asked Rosamund to have a drink with her father, actually forcing her to drink from his skull. Humiliated, Rosamund later got her revenge by having Alboin murdered in his sleep.

== In literature ==
Cunimund's grim end and Rosamund are mentioned in J. R. R. Tolkien's story "The Lost Road", when the character Alboin asks his father, Oswin Errol, about the origin of his name:

…and Oswin told his son the tale of Alboin son of Audoin, the Lombard king; and of the great battle of the Lombards and the Gepids, remembered as terrible even in the grim sixth century; and of the kings Thurisind and Cunimund, and of Rosamunda. 'Not a good story for near bed-time,' he said, ending suddenly with Alboin's drinking from the jewelled skull of Cunimund…

— J. R. R. Tolkien, The Lost Road

== Sources ==
- Asimov, Isaac. The Dark Ages. Boston: Houghton Mifflin Company, 1968.
- Diaconus, Paulus. Historia Langobardorum.
- Encyclopædia Britannica Eleventh Edition. 1911.
- Gibbon, Edward. The History of the Decline and Fall of the Roman Empire. Volume 4, Chapter XLV.
- Ker, William Paton. Epic and Romance: Essays on Medieval Literature, p. 67. 1908.
- Procopius. Wars of Justinian.
- Schmidt, Ludwig. Älteste Geschichte der Langobarden.
