= Guntheric (Gepid king) =

Co-king of the Gepids in the late 5th century

Guntheric was the king or leader of a band of Gepids in alliance with another group under Thrasaric.

In 489, after Thraustila's death at the Battle of Sirmium against the Ostrogoths, the Kingdom of the Gepids effectively split in two - the south went on to be ruled by Thrasaric under Ostrogothic suzerainty, while Guntheric took control of the territories north of the Danube. After the Ostrogothic campaign of 504, Guntheric disappears from the sources and fades into obscurity.

The Gepids were reunited under a single political entity under Guntheric's successor, Elemund, who ascended to the throne in the early half of the 6th century.
