= Brateiu Archaeological Complex =

Archaeological site in Transylvania, Romania

The Brateiu Archaeological Complex (Hungarian: Baráthely, German: Prettoa) is an archaeological site located in Transylvania, Romania, consisting of settlement remains and several cemeteries. Archaeological research has revealed two distinct occupation layers, officially referred to as Brateiu 1 and Brateiu 2, which are separated both chronologically and culturally. Brateiu 1 dates to the 4th century, while Brateiu 2 is attributed to the 8th and early 9th centuries.

== Brateiu 1 ==
The earliest archaeological layer at Brateiu, known as Brateiu 1, dates to the 4th century and includes both a settlement and a cremation cemetery. The interpretation of this phase remains subject to scholarly debate. Some Romanian archaeologists tend to consider the burial practices (particularly the use of scattered cremation) as evidence of Roman cultural continuity. In contrast, some Romanian, Hungarian, German, Russian and Austrian researchers acknowledge small formal similarities with late Roman funerary customs but emphasize that the structure of the graves, the nature of the offerings, and the associated artefacts are clearly characteristic of Germanic, specifically Gothic material culture. The pottery fragments found near the graves correspond to typical Gothic ceramic types, and similar burial practices have been documented at certified Visigothic cemeteries, such as those excavated near Chișinău. The controversy was further complicated by the discovery of three Roman coins found near one of the graves, however, it remains uncertain whether the coins were originally associated with the burial itself. At the same time, the settlement connected to the cemetery was also excavated, and the material culture uncovered there has been identified as stylistically Gothic. Artefacts such as ceramic vessels, jewellery, humped bone combs, buckles, fibulae, as well as deliberately buried agricultural tools including spade shoes, sickles, and cart fittings, all display formal characteristics that are typical of Gothic craftsmanship and design. The graves generally contain little to no valuable ornamentation or jewellery, suggesting that the community led a modest lifestyle with limited access to luxury goods. The arrangement of the burials and the nature of the grave goods indicate that the population followed pagan religious practices. An interesting detail is that a buckle with an oval plate was also found in the grave, which represents a reworked Germanic version of the former Roman provincial style. This type of buckle is one of the most widespread finds among the Germanic peoples, with variations found from Hispania all the way to the Crimea and Scandinavia. In one of the graves, a small silver hairpin was also found, which is a highly specific feature characteristic of the East Germanic tribes in the 5th century. A fibula was also found in one of the graves, which is not Germanic but bears typical post-Hunnic archaeological characteristics, with analogies from the steppe region located north of the Black Sea.

According to Ligia Barzu, the funerary discoveries at Bratei 1 should be divided into two distinct groups of Germanic graves. The first includes one grave discovered at settlement no. 2 and three additional graves located at the southern edge of Cemetery no. 2. The second group comprises five burials reported by M. Bogatscher, the head of the local quarry, which were unfortunately destroyed by sand extraction. Only partial inventories were recovered from these graves, but they appear to represent the earliest burial horizon of what has been designated Cemetery no. 3.

The anthropological analysis of the burial site was conducted by O. Nekrasov, whose study concluded that the physical characteristics of the individuals interred in the cemetery exhibit notable affinities with the Visigothic populations formerly inhabiting the Pontic steppe region.

While there is no full scholarly consensus regarding the precise ethnic identity of the population. Archaeologists agree, however, that the community associated with the Brateiu 1 settlement and cemetery either disappeared or moved away by the second half of the 4th century, as no archaeological material from a later period has been recovered at the site.

== Brateiu 2 ==
Brateiu 2 refers to a separate archaeological site, dating to the 8th century, which also includes a settlement. Although only partially excavated, the settlement is notable for its combination of Slavic, Gepidic, and Avar elements, and features stone-hearth houses and ovens. The associated cemetery is extensive and contains burials of a culturally mixed population, reflecting a Slavic-Avar-Gepid community. There is no archaeological or cultural continuity between this site and the earlier 4th-century Brateiu 1 site. According to current archaeological evidence, the urn cemetery at Brateiu 2 was not in use before the early 8th century.

=== Slavic and Avar ===
The Brateiu 2 cemetery is the largest Slavic urnfield cemetery in the Carpathian Basin. A significant number of Avar burials are also present, with evidence suggesting that the Slavic and Avar graves were contemporaneous. The cemetery contains 34 Avar inhumation graves, including two horse burials and two graves featuring inscriptions in runic script. Among the Slavic graves, archaeologists have documented 210 cremation burials, of which 45 are urn graves. The Avar skeleton burials are dispersed across the entire cemetery, and their orientation, aside from a few exceptions, follows patterns typical of the late Avar period. Approximately 90 percent of all Avar artefacts from the site, including stirrups, bits, cast bronze belt fittings, earrings with small globes, watermelon seed-shaped beads, awls, and ceramic vessels, derive from these inhumation graves. The burial customs, dress, and accompanying artefacts closely resemble those of modest rural Avar communities elsewhere in the Carpathian Basin during the 8th century. Notably, the cemetery holds unique importance due to the discovery of Avar artefacts such as earrings with small globes, crescent-shaped earrings with silver pendants, iron rattles, and several cast bronze belt ornaments with leaf motifs in four cremation graves. These findings serve as crucial evidence of the contemporaneity and interconnectedness of the two burial traditions. Even in the early 9th century, the cemetery retains Avar characteristics, as evidenced by late features such as the horse grave and its complete set of equipment. In the final phases of use, hand-shaped Prague-Korchak culture-type urns and vessels disappear from the cemetery. The earliest Slavic urns at Brateiu 2 date to the 8th and 9th centuries and feature pottery with wavy-line decorations, crafted on a potter’s wheel and originating from settlements in the Târnava Valley. Most of the Slavic graves postdate the Avar presence and are characterized by locally made Slavic urns and ceramic vessels. During this period, grave goods largely vanish, with only occasional beads or iron knives appearing as exceptions. In the cemetery, there are also graves of Slavic origin that archaeologically exhibit strong similarities to Gepidic graves, suggesting that a part of the population assimilated to the Gepidic culture.

=== Gepids (sometimes referred to as Brateiu 3) ===
The cemetery known as "Brateiu 3" is notable for its nearly 300 Gepid Christian graves and has yielded a wide range of artifacts. Among these are items of personal adornment, such as disc-shaped fibulae and both Gepid and imported Byzantine and Frankish belt buckles, as well as ceramic vessels like pouring-spout jugs with smoothed and stamped decoration, and weaponry including double-edged swords, spears, and arrowheads. Particularly striking is the presence of artificially deformed skulls, a distinctive cultural trait of the Gepids, which are also found in other Gepidic cemeteries excavated at Odorheiu Secuiesc, Bahnea, and Sighișoara. In the Christian Gepid cemetery, Grave 7 revealed the remains of a wealthy woman buried according to typical Gepid customs, including cranial deformation. She was interred with a rich assemblage of grave goods, such as gold and silver earrings, fibulae, buckles, and gold pins with openwork polyhedral heads. An interesting detail is that a specific type of necklace regularly appears in the graves of this cemetery, adorned with a cross-shaped casting. In Brateiu, all graves also contain the typical decorated D-shaped buckles characteristic of the Gepids. These are identical to the buckles found in Gepid settlements excavated in Serbia. It is also important to highlight that a significant number of weapons were found in the Gepid graves. A distinctive feature of the Gepid cemetery is the evidence of cultural symbiosis, as the ceramics found in these graves are of Slavic style. At the same time, the presence of early Avars at this site is also indicated by certain ceramic finds, including hand-made vessels with four-pointed rims of Inner Asian type.

In connection with this archaeological layer, it has been suggested that an earlier 6th-century Gepid cemetery may have existed in the area, and that the excavated layer represents a continuation of that burial ground. However, according to other researchers, this earlier layer is not associated with the Gepids, but rather with a Slavic population.
