= Pannonian Basin =

Sedimentary basin in Central Europe

Coordinates: 46°30′N 20°00′E

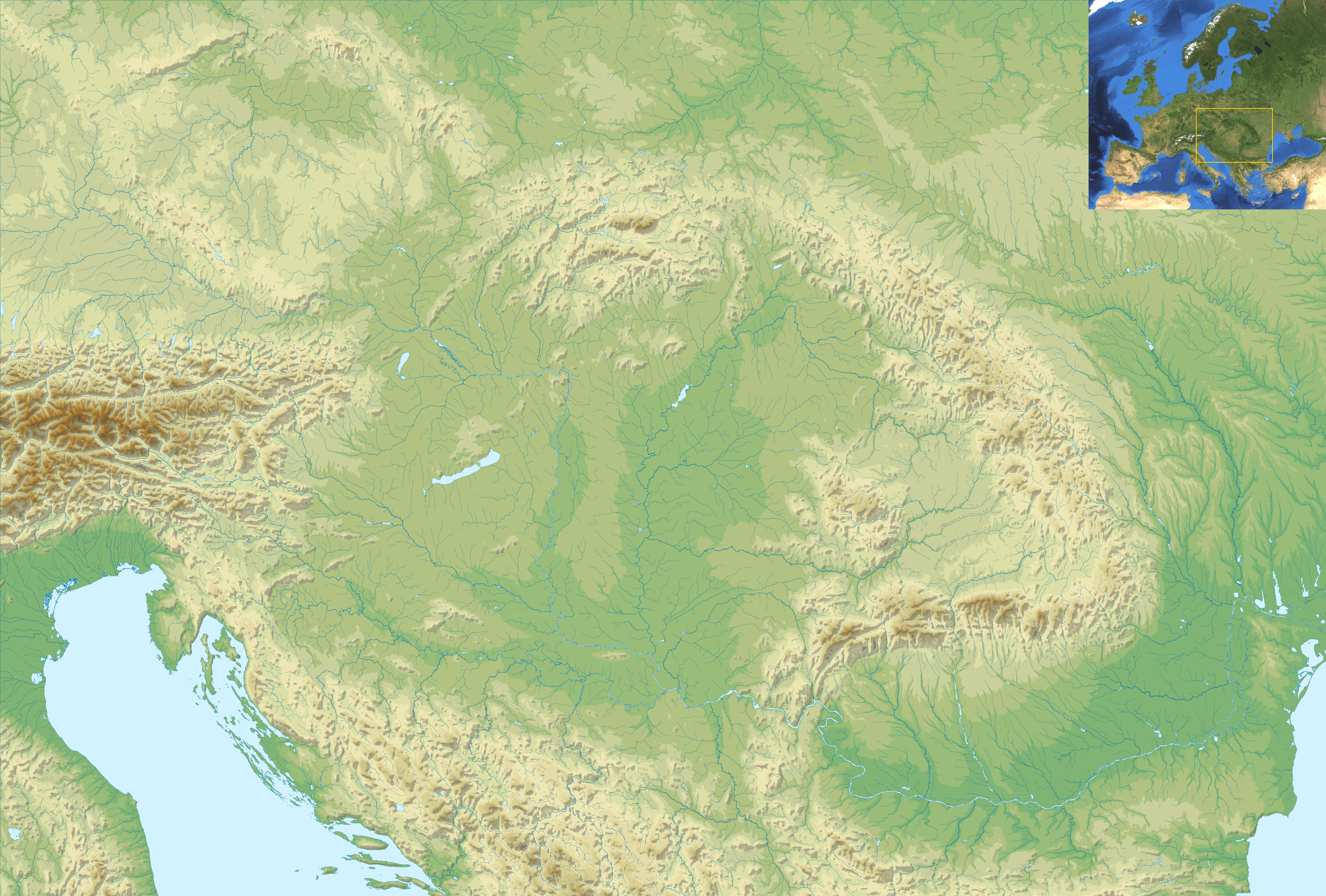
Geographic map of the Carpathian and Pannonian Basin in Central Europe

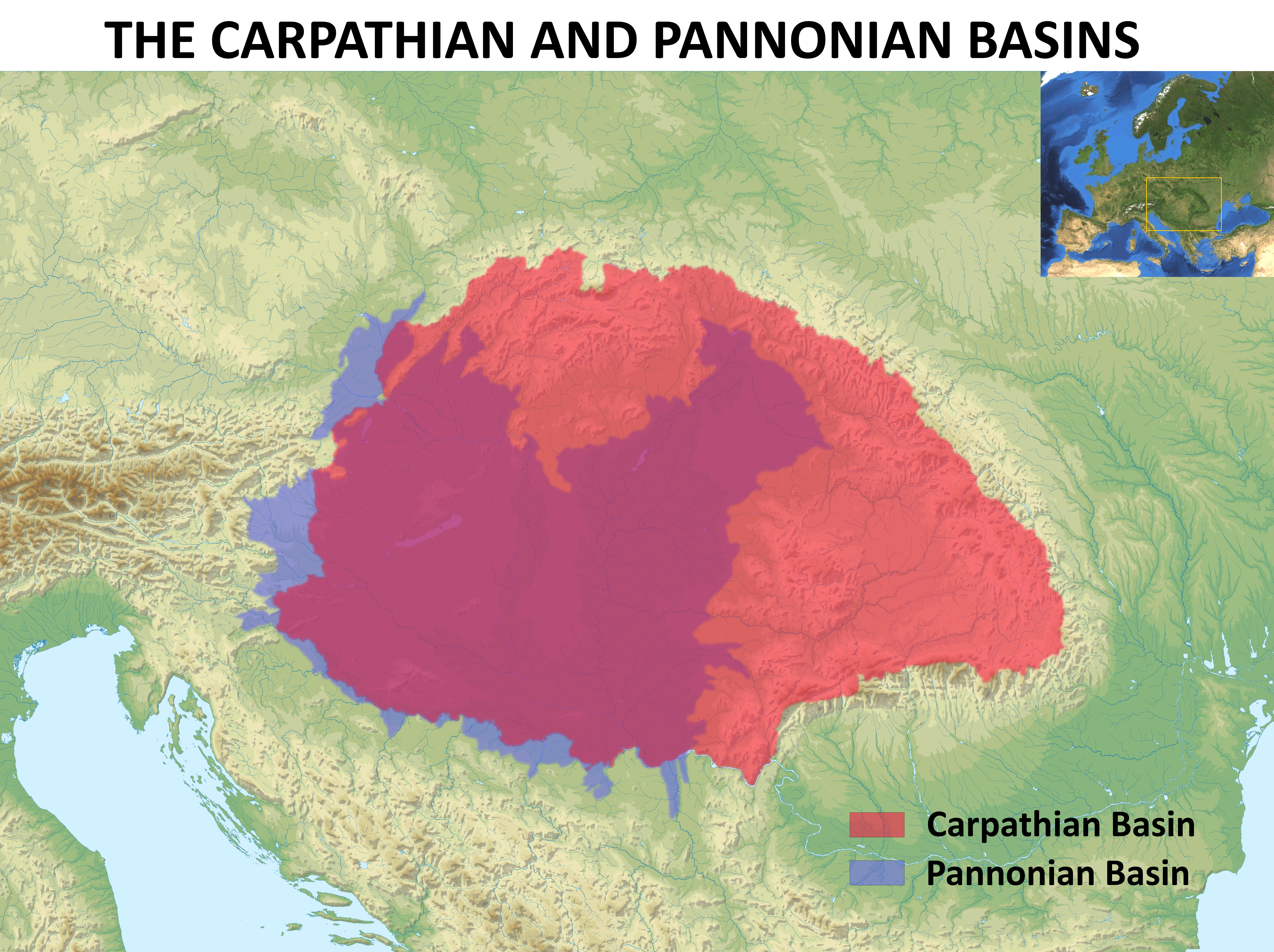
The Carpathian and Pannonian Basins

The Pannonian Basin, or Carpathian Basin, is a large, mainly lowland area in southeastern Central Europe, briefly described as a sedimentary basin. It was the core territory of the historical Kingdom of Hungary.

Under the geopolitically changed conditions created by World War I and the ensuing Treaty of Trianon, the geomorphological term Pannonian Plain was also used for roughly the same region, referring to the lowlands in the area occupied by the Pannonian Sea during the Pliocene. However, Hungarian geographers consider the term "Pannonian Plain" not only unhistorical but also topographically highly erroneous. Regarding the name as such, they are arguing in terms of ancient history, namely that the northern and eastern boundary line of the namesake Roman province of Pannonia was formed by the River Danube. The Roman province Pannonia was bounded on the north and east by the Danube river, thus the Great Hungarian Plain was not part of that province.

Situated at the westernmost end of the Eurasian Steppe, the Carpathian Basin historically served as a settlement zone for various peoples migrating westward across the Steppe, including the Huns, Avars and Magyars, and later for groups such as the Pechenegs and Cumans.

== Boundaries ==
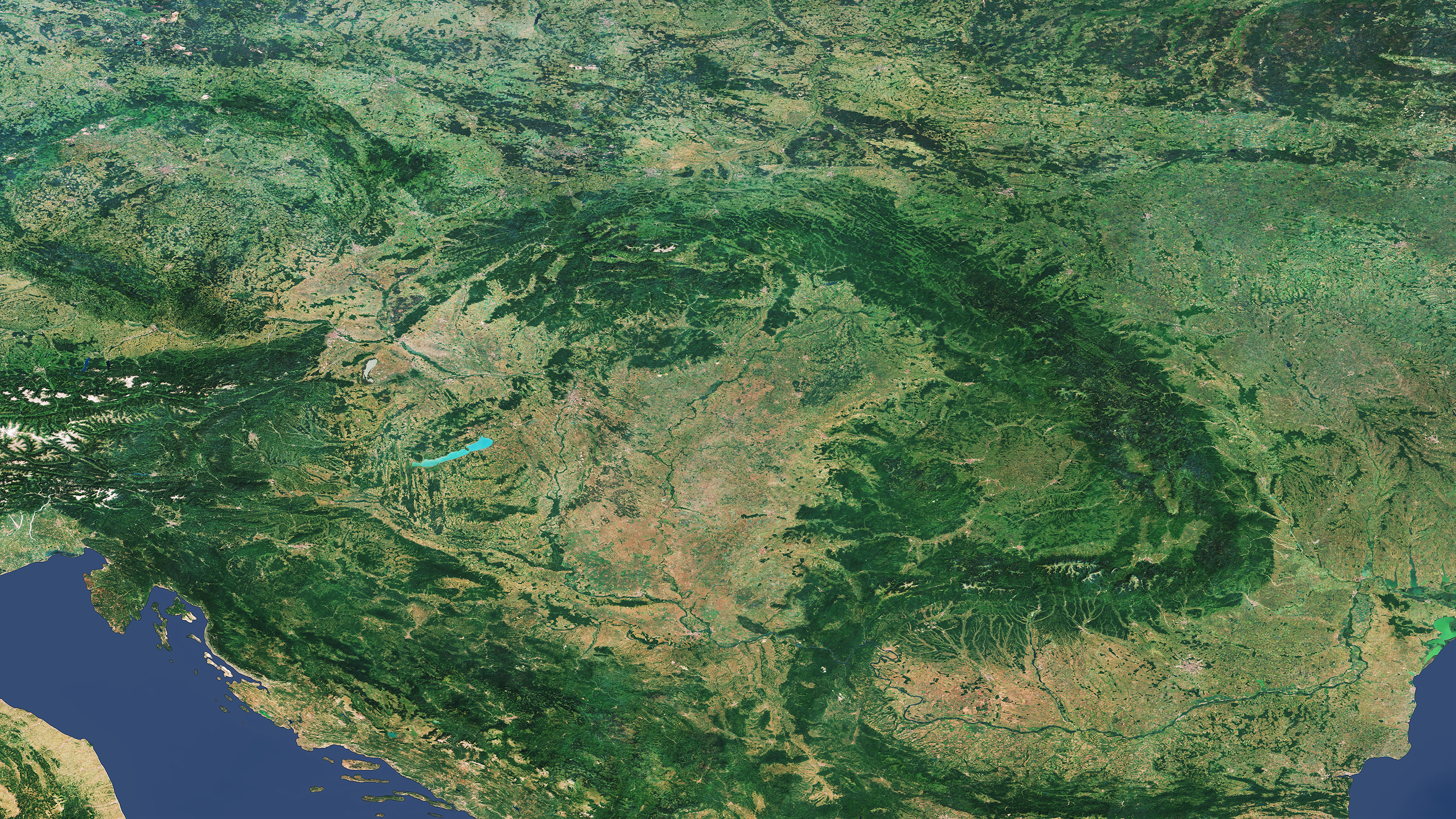
Satellite map of the Carpathian and Pannonian Basin in Central Europe

The plain or basin and its area are defined differently by different schools of thought, sometimes motivated by national agendas.

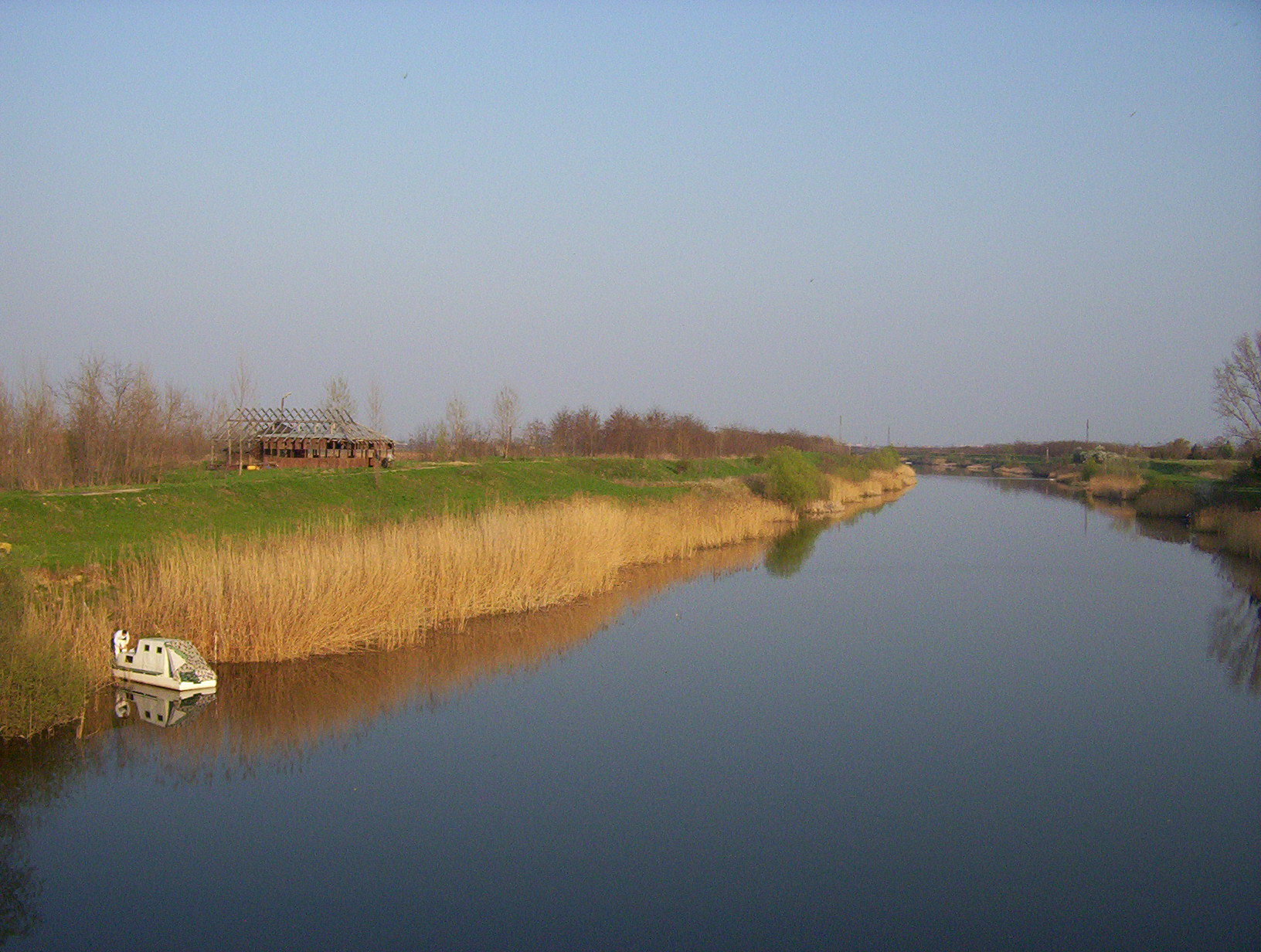
The Danube-Tisa-Danube Canal near the village of Rumenka, close to Novi Sad

=== Wider definition ===
According to one definition, it forms a topographically discrete unit set in the European landscape, surrounded by geographic boundaries: the Carpathian Mountains to the north and east, the Dinaric Alps to the south and southwest, and the Alps to the west. The Transdanubian Mountains diagonally bisect it, separating the larger Great Hungarian Plain with the Eastern Slovak Lowland, from the Little Hungarian Plain to the northwest. The plain is also associated with the Pannonian Steppe.

In terms of modern state boundaries, this definition of the Pannonian Basin centres it on the territory of Hungary, which lies entirely within the basin, but it also covers parts of southern Slovakia, southeast Poland, western-southwest Ukraine, parts of western Romania, depends on one's approach), northern Serbia, northeast Croatia, northeast Slovenia, and eastern Austria.

=== Narrower definition ===
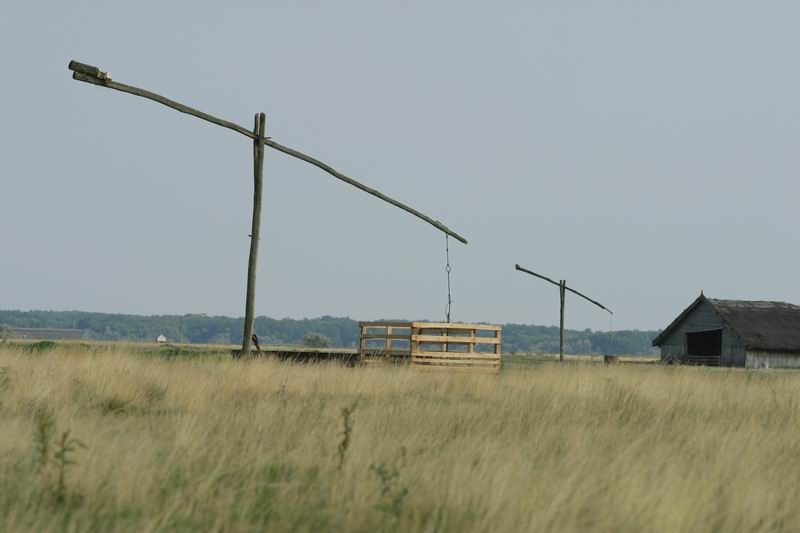
A farm on the Hortobágy National Park

Others exclude from this term the outlaying areas, such as the Transylvanian Plain.

== Terminology ==
The term Pannonian Plain refers to the lowland parts of the Pannonian Basin as well as those of some adjoining regions like Lower Austria, Moravia, and Silesia (Czech Republic and Poland). The lands adjoining the plain proper are sometimes also called peri-Pannonian.

In English language, the terms "Pannonian Basin" and "Carpathian Basin" may sometimes be used synonymously, although the latter holds an irredentist Hungarian connotation.

The name "Pannonian" is taken from that of Pannonia, a province of the Roman Empire. Pannonia was bounded on the north and east by the Danube river. The historical province overlapped but was not coterminous with the geographical plain or basin, as only the western part of the territory (known as Transdanubia) of modern Hungary formed part of the ancient Pannonia, while the Great Hungarian Plain was not part of it:

The term Carpathian Basin is used in Hungarian literature, while the West Slavic languages (Czech, Polish and Slovak), the Serbo-Croatian, German and Romanian languages use Pannonian Basin (in Hungarian the basin is known as Kárpát-medence; in Czech, Panonská pánev; in Polish, Panoński Basen; in Slovak, Panónska panva; in Slovenian and Serbo-Croatian, Panonski bazen/Панонски базен; in German, Karpatenbecken/Pannonische Tiefebene; and in Romanian, Câmpia Panonică or Bazinul Panonic). The East Slavic languages, namely Ukrainian, use the terms Tysa-Danube Lowland or Middanubian Lowland (Ukrainian: Тисо-Дунайська низовина, Середньодунайська низовина)

=== Pannonian Basin vs Carpathian Basin ===
Hungarian literature often gives preference to the term Carpathian Basin, not least due to the irredentist concept of the historical Kingdom of Hungary being the organic result of a landscape-determined ethnogenesis in a region defined by its natural, mountainous boundaries, the corollary being that the current national borders are not natural and defy historical and economic logic.

==== Hungarian arguments in favour of "Carpathian Basin" ====
The territory of present-day Hungary only overlaps with the ancient Roman province of Pannonia in Transdanubia (a traditional Hungarian term for the area bordered by the Danube River to the north and east, the Drava and Mura rivers to the south, and the foothills of the Alps toward Austria to the west); however the Great Hungarian Plain was not part of Pannonia province. Transdanubia comprises less than 29% of modern Hungary, therefore Hungarian geographers avoid the terms "Pannonian Basin", and especially the "Pannonian Plain", due to them being considered not only unhistorical but also topographically erroneous. Because the term "Pannonian" has historically not applied to 80% of the basin's territory, Hungarian geographers and historians use what they consider to be the more accurate term "Carpathian Basin". The topographical problem with the Pannonian "Plain" term is that with the exception of the Little Hungarian Plain (which is only around 15% of the territory of ancient Pannonian Transdanubia), hills and mountains dominate the landscape, so real plains are very rare on that territory. The largest plain of the Roman Pannonia province is located in Slavonia in Croatia and Voivodine in modern Serbia.

=== Roman province of Pannonia ===
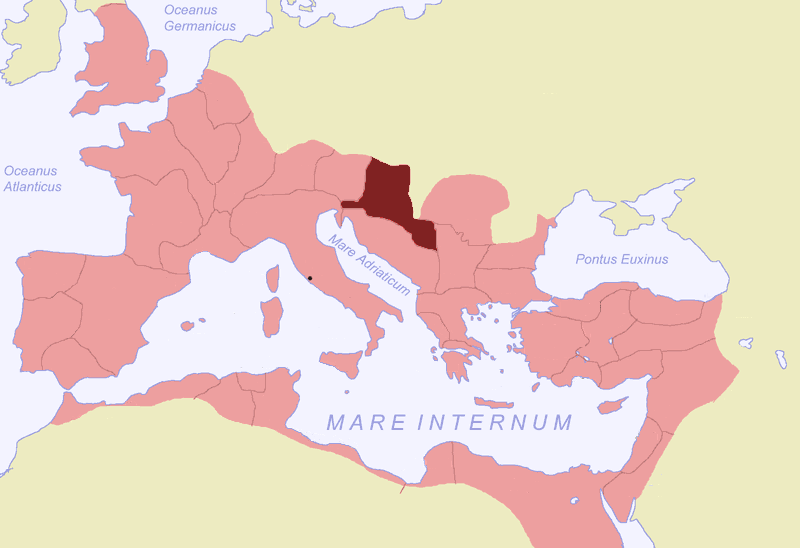
Pannonia within the Roman Empire

- Pannonia Inferior covered much of the western half of the basin, being bordered by the Danube to the east.
- Pannonia Superior included the western fringe of the basin as well as part of the Eastern Alps, as far as Virunum. The southern fringe of the basin was in Dalmatia and Moesia.
- The eastern half of the basin was not conquered by the Romans and was considered part of Sarmatia, inhabited by the Iazyges. Likewise, the parts north of the Danube (now in western Slovakia) were not in the empire; they were considered part of Germania, inhabited by the Quadi.

== Etymology ==
=== Pannonia ===
Julius Pokorny (1887-1970) derived the name Pannonia from Illyrian, from the Proto-Indo-European root *pen-, "swamp, water, wet" (cf. English fen, "marsh"; Hindi pani, "water").

=== Carpathians ===
The name "Carpates" is highly associated with the old Dacian tribes called "Carpes" or "Carpi" who lived in a large area from the east, northeast of the Black Sea to the Transylvanian Plain in present day Romania and Moldova. The name Carpates may ultimately be from the Proto Indo-European root *sker-/*ker-, which meant mountain, rock, or rugged (cf. Germanic root *skerp-, Old Norse harfr "harrow", Gothic skarpo, Middle Low German scharf "potsherd", and Modern High German Scherbe "shard", Old English scearp and English sharp, Lithuanian kar~pas "cut, hack, notch", Latvian cìrpt "to shear, clip").

The archaic Polish word karpa meant 'rugged irregularities, underwater obstacles/rocks, rugged roots, or trunks'. The more common word skarpa means a sharp cliff or other vertical terrain. The name may instead come from Indo-European *kwerp 'to turn', akin to Old English hweorfan 'to turn, change' (English warp) and Greek καρπός karpós 'wrist', perhaps referring to the way the mountain range bends or veers in an L-shape.

== Geology ==
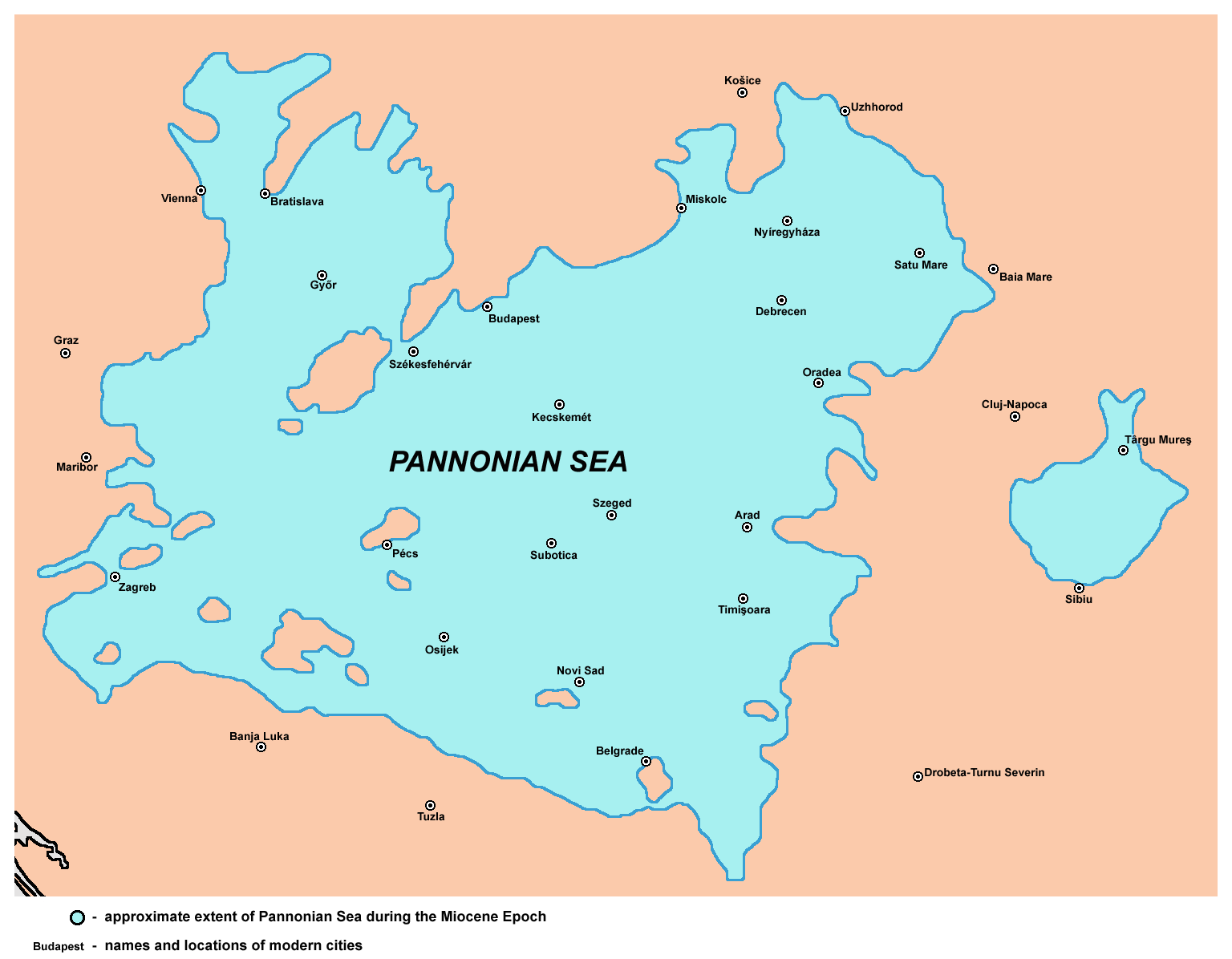
The approximate extent of the Pannonian Sea during the Miocene Epoch

The Pannonian Basin has its geological origins in the shallow Pannonian Sea, which reached its greatest extent during the Pliocene, when three to four kilometres of sediments were deposited.

== Geography ==
=== Eco- and bioregion ===
The biogeographic regions of Europe. The Pannonian Basin is shown in orange

The Pannonian mixed forests cover the extent of the plain

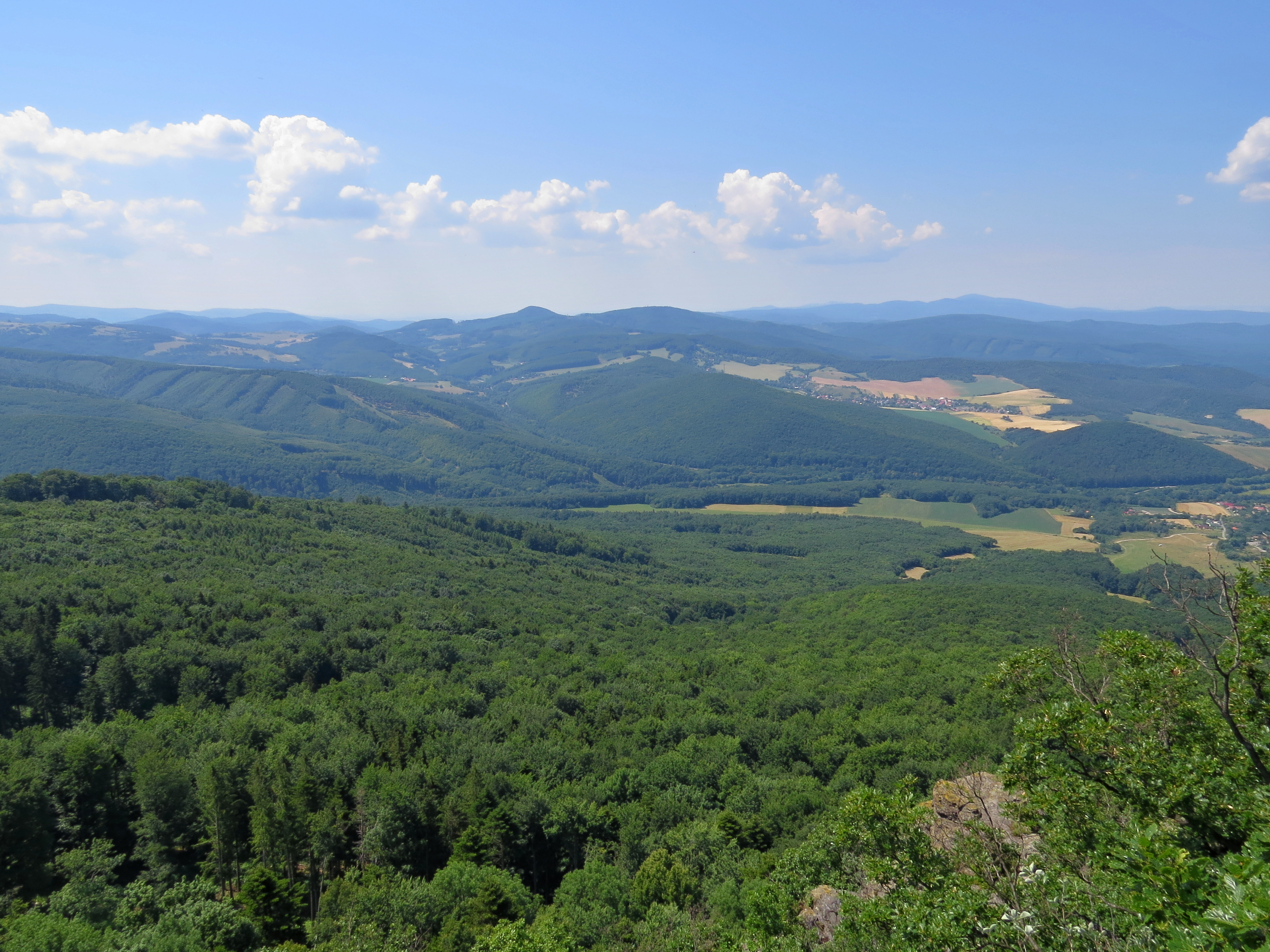
Buchlov Nature Reserve near the edge of the basin

Both the plain and the basin overlap significantly with the Pannonian mixed forests ecoregion.

The plain is also associated with Pannonian Steppe.

=== Rivers, boundaries, subdivisions ===
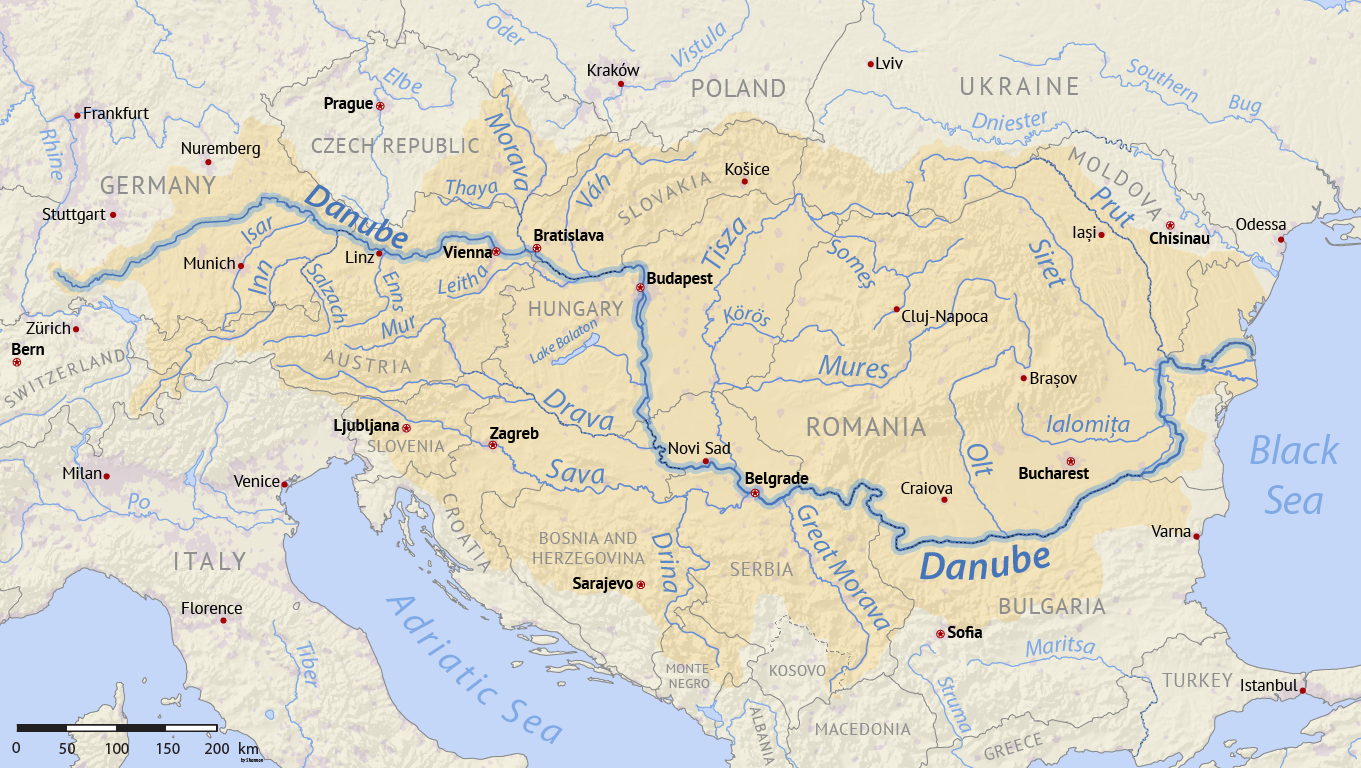
Map of the Danube

The plain or basin forms a topographically discrete unit set in the European landscape, surrounded by imposing geographic boundaries—the Carpathian Mountains to the north and east, the Dinaric Alps to the south and southwest and the Alps to the west. It is diagonally bisected by the Transdanubian Mountains, separating the larger Great Hungarian Plain (including the Eastern Slovak Lowland) from the Little Hungarian Plain.

The Danube and Tisza rivers divide the basin roughly in half. It extends roughly between Vienna in the northwest, Košice in the northeast, Zagreb in the southwest, Novi Sad in the south and Satu Mare in the east. The Danube enters the basin from its northwest through a valley that splits the Alps and the Bohemian Forest. It runs through the center of the basin exiting it at its southeast margin, where the South Carpathians transition to the Dinaric Alps and Balkan Mountains. The Tisza enters the basin from the northeast, flowing down from the Eastern Carpathians, continuing southwest and south, until it joins the Danube in the southern area of the basin. Another important river of the region is the Sava, which flows along the eastern foothills of the Dinaric Alps and together with the Danube forms a conditional northern limit of the Balkan Peninsula. It also flows into the Danube in the southern part of the Pannonian Basin. Other major rivers include Drava, Mureș, Great Morava, Drina. Lake Balaton is situated in the western part of Pannonia.

=== Climate and natural resources ===
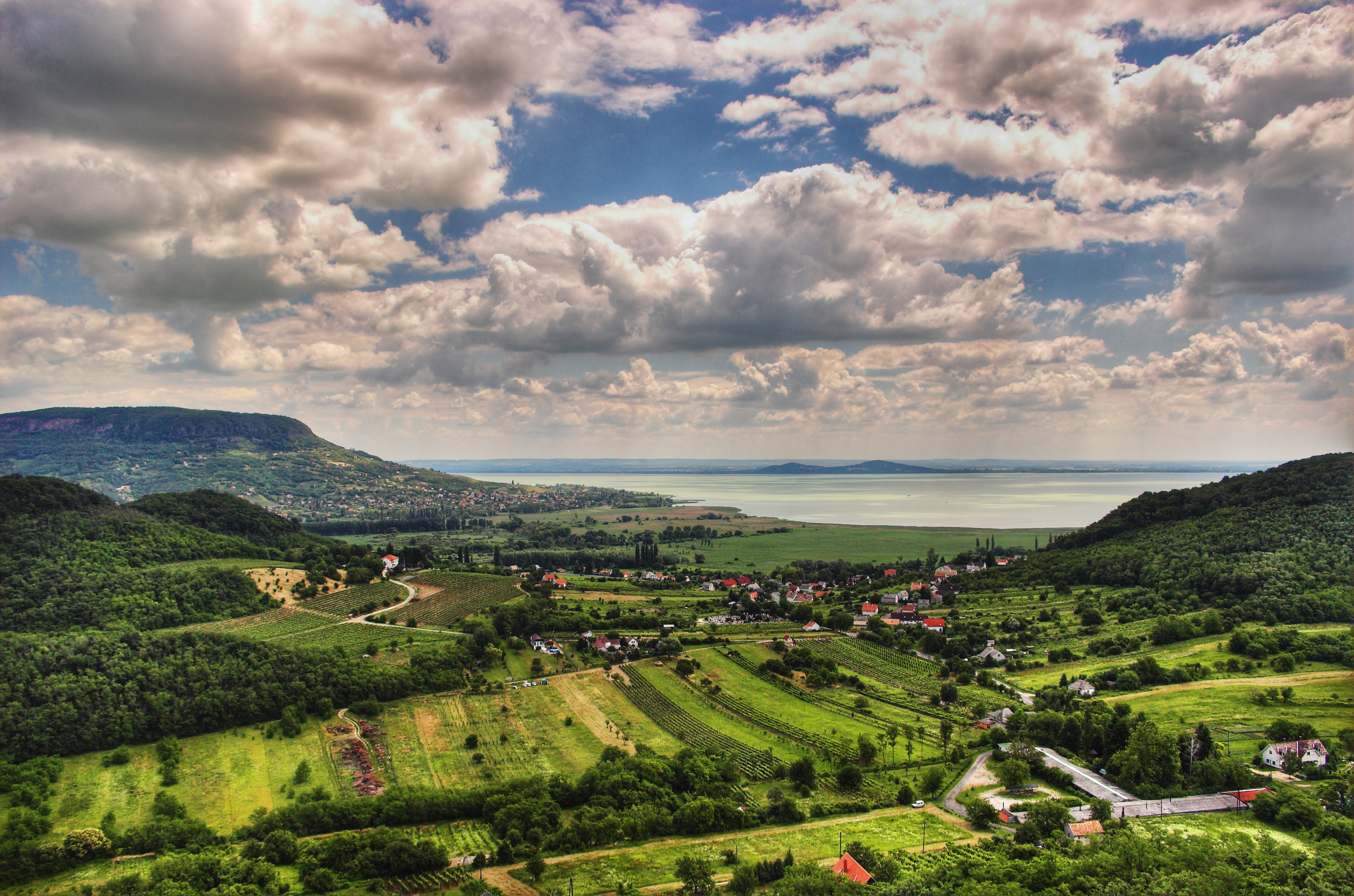
Lake Balaton in Transdanubia

Although rain is not plentiful, the plain is a major agricultural area. It is sometimes said that these fields of rich loamy loess soil could feed the whole of Europe. However, there has been an increase in extreme precipitation events that cause soil erosion in recent years. Knowledge of areas affected by severe soil erosion can lead to the implementation of effective measures to reduce it.

For the scarcity of natural resources encountered by the early settlers, see also Prehistory.

=== Geomorphology ===
The Pannonian Basin is a geomorphological subsystem of the Alps-Himalaya system, specifically a sediment-filled back-arc basin which spread apart during the Miocene.

The Pannonian plain is divided into two parts along the Transdanubian Mountains (Hungarian: Dunántúli-középhegység). The northwestern part is called Western Pannonian plain (or province) and the southeastern part Eastern Pannonian plain (or province). They comprise the following sections:

- Western Pannonian Plain (province):
  - Vienna Basin
  - Little Hungarian Plain
- Eastern Pannonian Plain (province):
  - Great Hungarian Plain
  - Pannonian Island Mountains (Serbian: Panonske ostrvske planine)
  - Transdanubian Mountains (Hungarian: Dunántúli-középhegység)
  - Drava–Mura lowlands

Note: The Transylvanian Plateau and the Lučenec-Košice Depression (both parts of the Carpathians) and some other lowlands are sometimes also considered part of the Pannonian Plain in non-geomorphological or older divisions.

=== Regions ===
Relatively large or distinctive areas of the plain that do not necessarily correspond to national borders include:

- Bačka/Bácska (Serbia, Hungary)
  - Šajkaška (Serbia)
  - Telečka (Serbia)
  - Gornji Breg (Serbia)
- Banat (Romania, Serbia, Hungary)
  - Pančevački Rit (Serbia)
  - Veliki Rit (Serbia)
  - Gornje Livade (Serbia)
- Baranya/Baranja (Hungary, Croatia)
- Burgenland (Neusiedler Basin), Austria
- Crişana (Hungary, Romania)
- Great Hungarian Plain (Hungary, Croatia, Serbia, Slovakia, Romania, Ukraine)
- Jászság (Hungary)
- Kunság (Hungary)
- Little Hungarian Plain (Kisalföld/Malá dunajská kotlina – Hungary, Slovakia)
- Mačva (Serbia)
- Međimurje (Croatia)
- Moravia (part), Czech Republic
- Moslavina (Croatia)
- Podravina (Croatia, Hungary, around Drava river)
- Podunavlje (Serbia, Croatia, around Danube river)
- Pokuplje (Croatia, around Kupa river)
- Pomoravlje (part), Serbia, around Morava river
- Pomorišje (Romania, Hungary, Serbia, around Mureș river)
- Posavina (Croatia, Bosnia and Herzegovina, Serbia, around Sava river)
- Potisje (Serbia, around Tisa river)
- Prekmurje (Slovenia)
- Semberija (Bosnia and Herzegovina)
- Slavonia (Croatia)
  - Palača (Croatia)
- Srem/Srijem (Serbia, Croatia)
  - Podlužje (Serbia)
  - Šokadija (Croatia)
  - Spačva (Croatia, Serbia)
  - Cvelferija (Croatia)
- Zakarpattia Lowland (Ukraine)
- Transdanubia (Hungary)
- Vienna Basin (part), Austria
- Vojvodina (Serbia)
- several more inside Hungary, see: Counties of Hungary, Regions of Hungary
- several more inside Slovakia, see: Traditional regions of Slovakia, Regions of Slovakia

== History ==
=== Prehistory ===
For its early settlers, the plain offered few sources of metals or stone. When archaeologists come upon objects of obsidian or chert, copper or gold, they have almost unparalleled opportunities to interpret ancient pathways of trade.

=== Antiquity ===
Various different peoples inhabited the plain during its history. In the first century BC, the eastern parts of the plain belonged to the Dacian state, and in the first century AD its western parts were subsumed into the Roman Empire. The Roman province named Pannonia was established in the area, and the city of Sirmium, today Sremska Mitrovica, Serbia, became one of the four capital cities of the Roman Empire in the 3rd century.

=== Middle Ages ===
In the Age of Migrations and the early Middle Ages, the region belonged to several realms such as the Hun Empire, the Kingdom of the Gepids, the Kingdom of the Ostrogoths, the Kingdom of the Lombards, the Avar Khaganate, the West Slavic state of Samo, the Bulgarian Empire, the Frankish Empire, Great Moravia, the Lower Pannonian Principality and the Kingdom of Syrmia. The Principality of Hungary established in 895 by the Magyars was centered on the plain and included almost all of it (as did the former Avar Khaganate). It was established as the Catholic Kingdom of Hungary in AD 1000, with the coronation of Stephen I of Hungary.

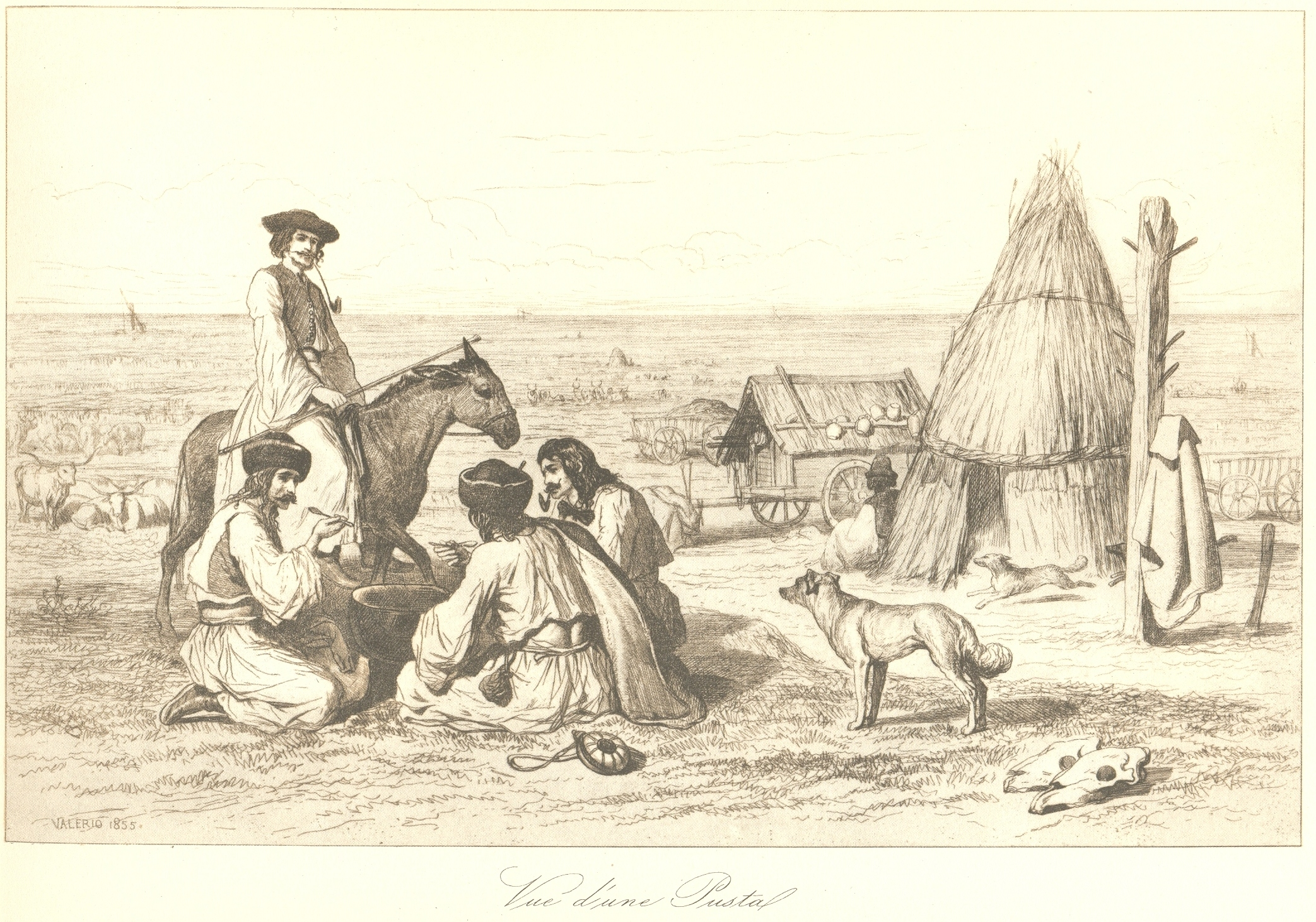
Cattle herders in the puszta of Hungary, c. 1852

The Kingdom of Hungary by the 11th century comprised the entire Pannonian Basin, but the changing fates of this part of Europe during the Ottoman wars of the 14th to 17th centuries left the Pannonian basin divided between numerous political entities. After the Battle of Mohács in 1526, the central and eastern regions of the kingdom and the plain on which they lay were incorporated into the Ottoman Empire, while the remainder to the north-west was subsumed into the holdings of the Habsburg monarchy and retitled Royal Hungary. Under Ottoman administration, the plain was reorganised into the Eyalet of Budim, the Eyalet of Egri, the Eyalet of Sigetvar and the Eyalet of Temeşvar.

=== Modern history ===
The Pannonian Plain was frequently a scene of conflict between the two empires. At the end of the 17th century the Habsburgs won decisive battles against the Ottomans, and most of the plain gradually came under Habsburg rule. Under Habsburg rule the region was eventually reorganised into the Kingdom of Hungary, the Banat of Temeswar, the Military Frontier, the Kingdom of Croatia, the Kingdom of Slavonia and Voivodeship of Serbia and Temes Banat.

The Habsburg Monarchy was subsequently transformed into the Austrian Empire (in 1804) and later became Austria-Hungary (in 1867). Most of the plain was located within the Hungarian part of Austria-Hungary, since all other Habsburg possessions in the plain were integrated into the Kingdom of Hungary until 1882. The autonomous Kingdom of Croatia-Slavonia, which was one of the Lands of the Crown of St. Stephen, comprised the south-western portion of the plain.

With the dissolution of Austria-Hungary after World War I, the region was divided between Hungary, Romania, Czechoslovakia, Austria and the Kingdom of Serbs, Croats and Slovenes (renamed to Yugoslavia in 1929). The borders drawn in 1918 and 1919 are mostly preserved as those of the contemporary states of Austria, Czech Republic, Hungary, Poland, Slovakia, Serbia, Ukraine, Croatia, and Romania.

== Major cities ==
This is a list of cities in the Pannonian Basin with a population larger than 100,000 within the city proper:

- Vienna Austria (2,002,821) ▲
- Budapest Hungary (1,750,268) ▲
- Belgrade Serbia (1,166,763) ▲
- Zagreb Croatia (812,635) ▲
- Bratislava Slovakia (546,300) ▲
- Timișoara Romania (319,279 ) ▲
- Novi Sad Serbia (306,702) ▲
- Košice Slovakia (240,688) ▲
- Debrecen Hungary (204,333) ▼
- Oradea Romania (196,367) ▼
- Miskolc Hungary (162,905) ▼
- Szeged Hungary (161,837) ▼
- Arad Romania (159,704) ▼
- Pécs Hungary (147,719) ▼
- Győr Hungary (128,567) ▼
- Nyíregyháza Hungary (118,185) ▼
- Uzhhorod Ukraine (115,163) ▼
- Kecskemét Hungary (111,863) ▲
- Osijek Croatia (108,048) ▼
- Subotica Serbia (105,681) ▼
- Satu Mare Romania (102,441) ▼

== See also ==
- Geography of Europe
- Central Europe
- Pannonian Biogeographic Region
- Pannonian mixed forests
- Pannonian Sea
- Transdanubian Mountains
- Pelso unit
- Tisza unit
