= Franziska Tesaurus =

Ancient Romanian royal tomb

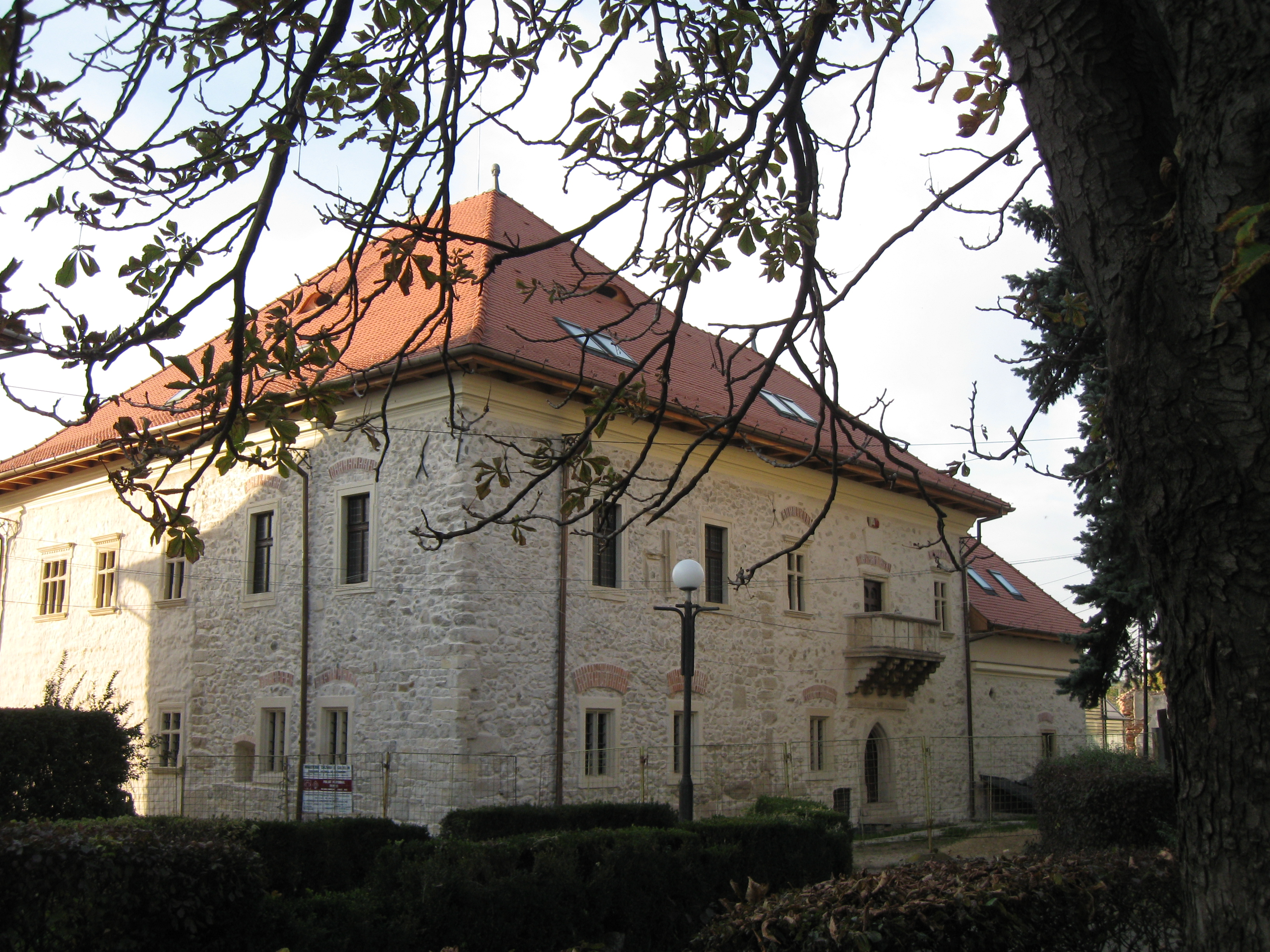
Turda Museum

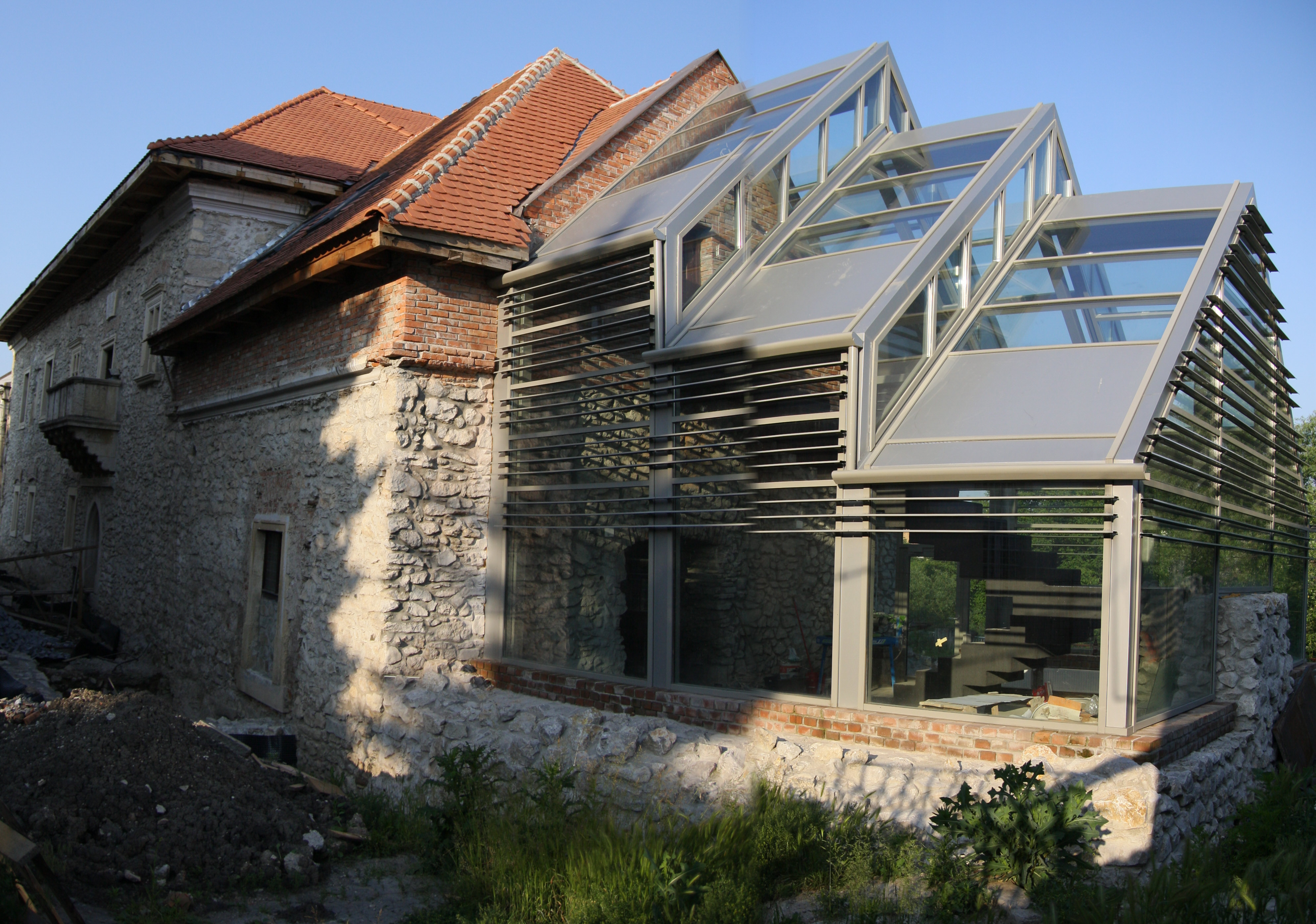
Turda Museum

Franziska Tesaurus is the richest Gepid royal tomb found in Romania. It was found while searching the Potaissa Roman castrum at Turda in 1996, by Mihai Bărbulescu, between the secondary sewer and the frigidarium. The inventory of the tomb was composed of: polyhedral golden rings with almandine, hemicyclical gold plated brooch, gold-plated silver belt with gold garments and almandine, amber necklace, embroidery decorations, bone comb, nomadic mirror, silver shoe belts, and small fragments of clothing.

It was put on display on 3 April 2007 in Turda History Museum.

== See also ==
- Apahida necropolis
- Romania in the Early Middle Ages
- Gepids
- Kingdom of the Gepids
