= Veliki Rit =

Veliki Rit may refer to:

- Veliki Rit, Novi Sad, a quarter of the city of Novi Sad, Serbia
- Veliki Rit, Banat, a small geographical area near Begej river in central-eastern Banat, Serbia
