= Pelso plate =

Small tectonic unit in the Pannonian Basin in Europe

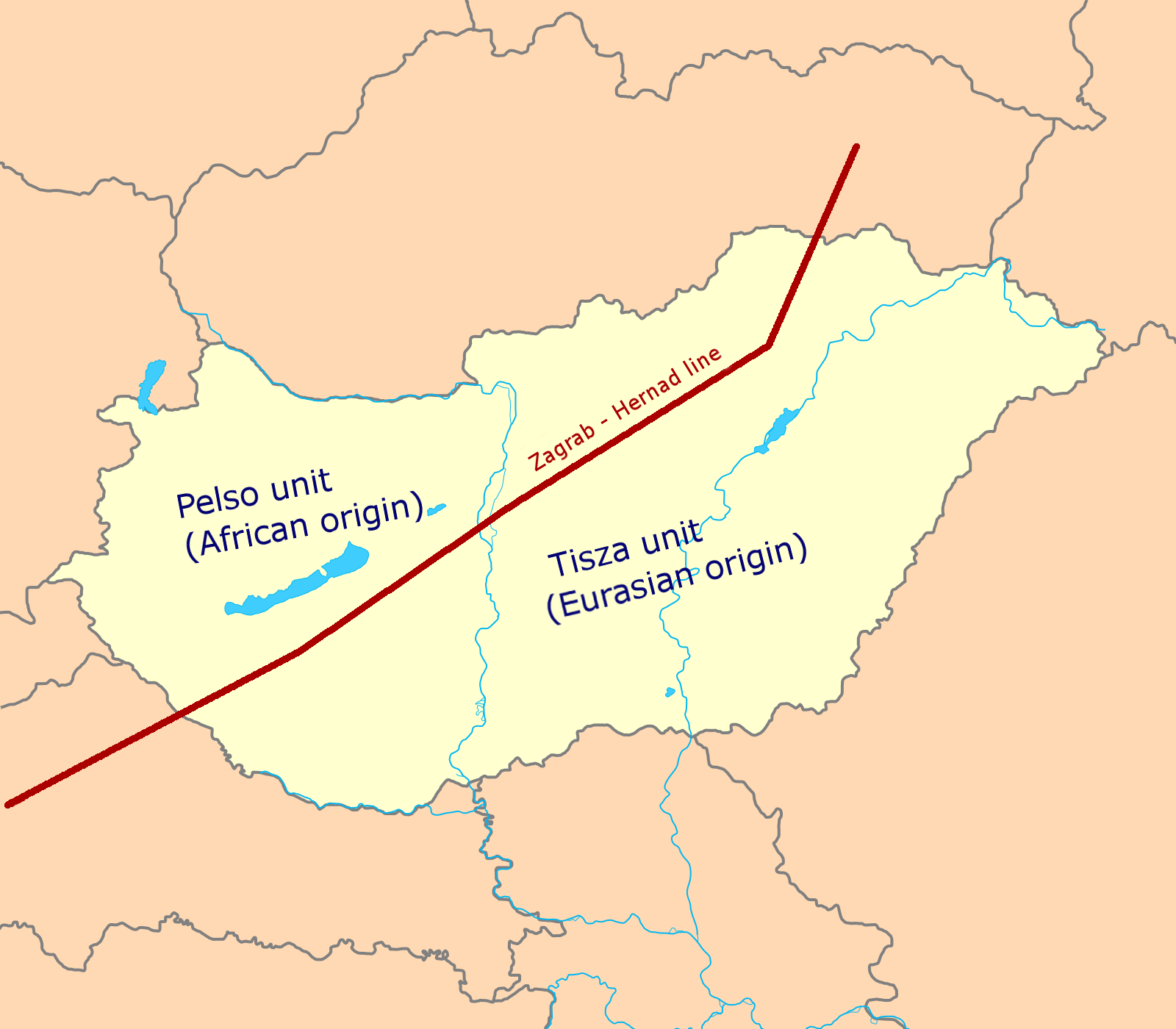
Pelso and Tisza units, the Zágráb-Hornád line is the former plate margin between them

Pelso plate or Pelsonia Terrane is a small tectonic unit. It is situated in the Pannonian Basin in Europe. The Carpathian Mountains and the basin surrounded by them were formed from the Cretaceous until the Miocene in the collision of continental Europe with smaller continental fragments of ALCAPA, Tisza, Pelso and Dacia microplates. The Zagreb-Hernád line is the former plate margin between the Pelso of African origin and the Tisza plate of Eurasian origin.

The Pelso block is sometimes considered as southern portion of the ALCAPA and compared with internal zone of Western Carpathian Mts. which is called Internal Western Capathians. The typical feature of this zone is Dinaric – Apulian facies of Triassic rocks, while the whole Alcapa is in some papers considered as part of the Apulian plate. The Pelso sensu stricto is therefore composed of Tornaic, Bukkic and Silicic superunits, that evolved south of the Meliata-Halstatt Ocean and the superimposed Cenozoic sedimentary cover.
