= Gepids =

Germanic tribe

Kingdom of the Gepids
- 454–567
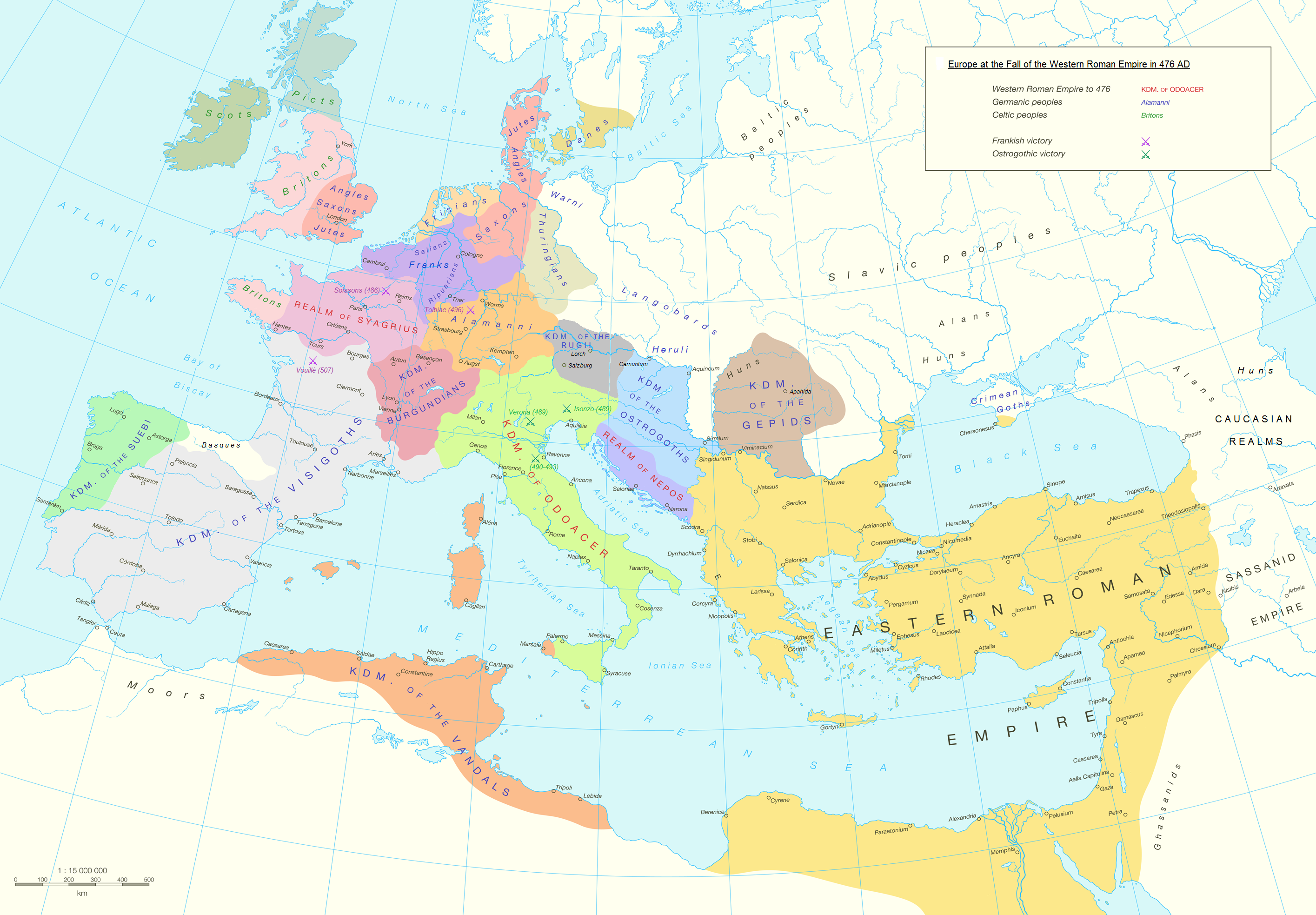
- Gepid kingdom in Europe following the end of the Western Roman Empire in 476 AD
- Capital: Sirmium
- Common languages: East Germanic (possibly Gothic) among elite.
- Religion: Germanic paganism, Arian Christianity (among elite)
- Government: Monarchy
- King
  - c. 454: Ardaric
  - c. 560-567: Cunimund
- History
  - Ardaric established an independent Gepid kingdom following the Hunnic defeat at the Battle of Nedao: 454
  - The kingdom is destroyed by the Lombards and Avars: 567
Preceded by	Succeeded by
Hunnic Empire; Ostrogothic Kingdom	Pannonian Avars; Kingdom of the Lombards
- Today part of: Romania, Hungary, Serbia

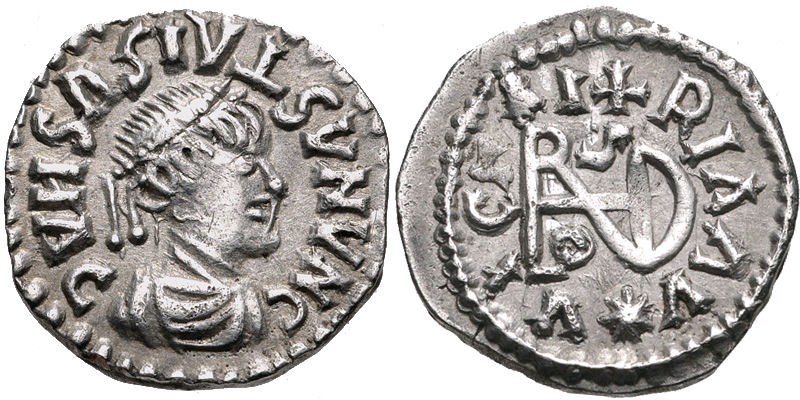
Coin of the Gepids c. 491–518. Sirmium mint. In the name of Byzantine Emperor Anastasius I

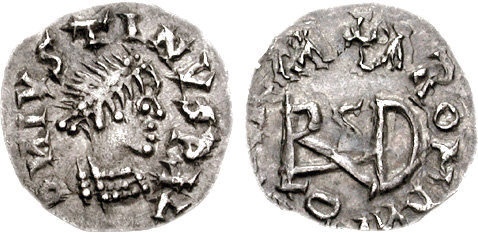
Coin of the Gepids. Sirmium mint. Struck in the name of Justin I, c. 518–526 CE. Obv: D N IVSTINVS P LV (first N retrograde), pearl-diademed and cuirassed bust right. Rev: VINVICTL ROMLNI, large "Theodericus" monogram across fields, cross above

The Gepids (Latin: Gepidae, Gipedae; Ancient Greek: Γήπαιδες, romanized: Gḗpaides) were an East Germanic tribe who lived in the area of modern Romania, Hungary, and Serbia, roughly between the Tisza, Sava, and Carpathian Mountains. They were said to share the religion and language of the Goths and Vandals.

They are first mentioned by Roman sources in the third century. In the fourth century, they were among the peoples incorporated into the Hunnic Empire, within which they formed an important part. After the death of Attila, the Gepids under their leader Ardaric, led an alliance of other peoples who had been in the empire, and defeated the sons of Attila and their remaining allies at the Battle of Nedao in 454. The Gepids and their allies subsequently founded kingdoms on the Middle Danube, bordering on the Roman Empire. The Gepid Kingdom was one of the most important and long-lasting of these, centered on Sirmium, and sometimes referred to as Gepidia. It covered a large part of the former Roman province of Dacia, north of the Danube, and compared to other Middle Danubian kingdoms it remained relatively uninvolved with Rome.

The Gepids were defeated by the Lombards and Avars a century later in 567, when Constantinople gave no support to them. Some Gepids joined the Lombards in their subsequent conquest of Italy, some moved into Roman territory, and other Gepids still lived in the area of the old kingdom after it was conquered by the Avars.

Few archaeological sites remain that can be attributed to them with certainty. After their settlement of the Carpathian Basin, their population was mostly centred on the Someș and Körös rivers, but they did not intermingle with other nations.

== Name ==
The most common Latin spellings of the Gepid name in plural used a "p", but varied concerning the vowels: Gepidae, Gipidae, Gipedae, Gipides. Similarly, Procopius writing in Greek uses a stem γηπαιδ- which should be transliterated as Giped-. Despite this, the Gepids have been equated with the people mentioned in the Old English Widsith and Beowulf, as Gifðas or Gefþas. These names are considered etymologically equivalent Old English forms of Gepidae that could not have arisen through borrowing from attested Latin forms.

Although Walter Goffart has objected that "no serious arguments substantiating the identification seem to me to have been set out", linguists interpret the "p" in Latin and Greek as an insulting Gothic nickname for the Gepids. In addition to the Old English words, placename evidence in Italy, and a single medieval Latin genitive plural form "Gebodorum" are taken to indicate that the "p" was really a fricative sound similar to a "b". Many linguists therefore reconstruct the original Germanic form as *Gíbidoz, based on the Germanic verb "to give", as still found in English (German geben, Dutch geven), apparently indicating that they named themselves gifted or rewarded or generous.

The idea that the recorded name of the Gepids was an insult comes from Jordanes in the sixth century, who reported in his Gothic origins story the Getica, that the name of the Gepids came from gepanta, an insult in Gothic meaning "sluggish, stolid" (pigra), because the Gepids had lagged behind their Gothic kin when they migrated more than a thousand years earlier.

In contrast, Isidore of Seville in his etymologies, interpreted the second part of the Gepid name as "feet" (Latin pedes) and explained that the Gepids were known for going into battle on foot (pedestri), rather than mounted. The much later (12th century) Byzantine Etymologicum Magnum interprets the name using the Greek word for children, making the Gepids Gētípaides (Γητίπαιδες) meaning "children of the Goths (equated to Getae)". All three of these texts follow a tradition of seeing the Gepids as "offshoots or close relatives of the Goths".

Tabula Peutingeriana, a 4th-century map shows the "Piti" people living next of Porolissum. Whether or not this is a distortion of Gepid is disputed by historians.

== Language ==
There is little direct evidence for the original language of the Gepids, but they were clearly Gothic in culture during the period when the Romans reported upon them. Most likely, the Gepids used the same language as the Goths, but in a different dialect. They had strained political relations with related peoples, the Goths and Vandals. The Byzantine chronicler of the 6th century, Procopius, in his Wars of Justinian, placed the Gepids among the "Gothic peoples" along with the Vandals, Visigoths and Goths proper, "having the same language, white bodies, blond hair and Arian form of Christianity". Their language was not mentioned after the 7th century and likely went extinct around this time period.

== History ==
=== Legendary ===
All information of the Gepids' origins came from "malicious and convoluted Gothic legends", recorded in Jordanes' Getica after 550. According to Jordanes's narration the northern island of "Scandza", which is associated with Sweden by modern scholars, was the original homeland of the ancestors of the Goths and Gepids. They left Scandza together in three boats under the leadership of Berig, the legendary Gothic king. Jordanes specified that the Gepids' ancestors traveled in the last of the three ships, for which their fellows mocked them as gepanta, or "slow and stolid." The Goths and Gepids then settled along the southern shore of the Baltic Sea on an island at the mouth of the Vistula river, called "Gepedoius", or the Gepids' fruitful meadows, by Jordanes. Modern historians debate whether the part of Jordanes's work which described the migration from Scandza was written at least partially on the basis of Gothic oral history or whether it was an "ahistorical fabrication." Jordanes's passage in his Getica reads:

Should you ask how the [Goths] and Gepidae are kinsmen, I can tell you in a few words. You surely remember that in the beginning I said the Goths went forth from the bosom of the island of Scandza with Berig, their king, sailing in only three ships toward the hither shore of Ocean, namely to Gothiscandza. One of these three ships proved to be slower than the others, as is usually the case, and thus is said to have given the tribe their name, for in their language gepanta means slow. Hence it came to pass that gradually and by corruption the name Gepidae was coined for them by way of reproach. For undoubtedly they too trace their origin from the stock of the Goths, but because, as I have said, gepanta means something slow and stolid, the word Gepidae arose as a gratuitous name of reproach.

According to Jordanes, the Gepids decided to leave "Gepedoius" during the reign of a king named Fastida. He claims the Gepids moved to the south long after the Goths had already moved, and defeated the Burgundians and other races, provoking the Goths in the process. Fastida demanded land from Ostrogotha, King of the Visigoths, because the Gepids' territory was "hemmed in by rugged mountains and dense forests". Ostrogotha refused Fastida's demand and the Gepids joined battle with the Goths "at the town of Galtis, near which the river Auha flows". They fought until darkness fell, when Fastida and his Gepids withdrew from the battlefield and returned to their land. Whether they still lived around the Vistula or had already conquered Galicia is debated by historians.

=== Before the arrival of the Huns ===
The Roman Empire under Hadrian (ruled 117–138), showing the location of the Gepidae (Gepids) East Germanic tribe, then inhabiting the region around the mouth of the Visula (Vistula) river, Poland.

The Gepids were the "most shadowy of all the major Germanic peoples of the migration period", according to historian Malcolm Todd. Neither Tacitus nor Ptolemy mentioned them in their detailed lists of the "barbarians" in the first and second centuries AD. They first appear only in the late 3rd century AD, and by this time they are already living in or near the area where they remained for the rest of their known history.

According to a common interpretation of the unreliable Augustan History of Emperor Claudius Gothicus (VI.2), Gepids were among the "Scythian" peoples conquered by the emperor when he earned his title "Gothicus": "peuci trutungi austorgoti uirtingi sigy pedes celtae etiam eruli". These words are traditionally edited by modern editors to include well-known peoples "Peuci, Grutungi, Austrogoti, Tervingi, Visi, Gipedes, Celtae etiam et Eruli". The same source also says that Emperor Probus, who ruled between 276 and 282, settled Gepid, Vandals, and Greuthungi prisoners of war in the Roman Empire in the Balkans.

In the 11th panegyric to emperor Maximian given in Trier in 291, which is also the first time the Tervingi and Taifali were mentioned, the passage described a battle outside the empire where the Gepids were on the side of the Vandals, attacked by Taifali and a "part" of the Goths. The other part of the Goths had defeated the Burgundians who were supported by Tervingi and Alemanni. They were however "remote enough from the imperial frontier for them not to appear in the Verona list or in the histories of Ammianus or Orosius".

Modern historians who write of the Gepids' early history sometimes apply a "mixed argumentation", combining Jordanes' narration with results of archaeological research. Historian István Bóna says that the battle mentioned in the panegyric was about 290 in the former province of Dacia, equating it to the battle mentioned by Jordanes, involving Fastida. Archaeologist Kurdt Horedt however also equates it to the battle involving Fastida and proposed that the battle took place east of the Carpathian Mountains after 248 and before the withdrawal of the Romans from the province of Dacia in the early 270s. Walter Pohl only says that the battle must have happened between 248 and 291, and could have been inside or outside the curve of the Carpathians, though he feels it is obvious that it must be in the region of the formerly Roman province of Dacia in Transylvania.

The Gepids' history in the 4th century is unknown, because no written source mentioned them during this period. The silence of the Roman sources suggests that their homeland did not border on the Roman Empire. On the basis of Jordanes' reference to the "rugged mountains" of the Gepids' land, historians locate it near the Carpathians, along the upper courses of either the Tisza or the Dniester rivers, in the late 3rd century. The exact date of the Gepids' settlement in the Carpathian Basin cannot exactly be determined. Archaeologist István Bóna says they were present in the northeastern region already in the 260s. According to Coriolan H. Opreanu, they seem to have arrived around 300. Archaeologists Eszter Istvánovits and Valéria Kulcsár write that no archaeological evidence substantiates the Gepids' presence before around 350.

Graves from the 4th century which yielded swords, lances and shields with iron boss were unearthed in cemeteries between the rivers Tisza and Körös (in present-day north-eastern Hungary and north-western Romania). Many scholars (including Kurdt Horedt, István Bóna and Coriolan H. Opreanu) attribute those graves to Gepid warriors. Graves of women from the same cemeteries produced artefacts—including bronze and silver clasps, bone combs, and fibulae—which are similar to objects found in the cemeteries of the nearby "Sântana de Mureș-Chernyakhov culture". István Bóna writes that the spread of these cemeteries shows that the Gepids subjugated the Germanic Victohali, who had previously inhabited the same region, before expanding towards the Mureș River in the middle of the 4th century.

=== Within the Hunnic Empire ===
A large group of diverse peoples from the region of the Middle Danube crossed the river Rhine and invaded the Roman Empire in 405 or 406. Although most contemporaneous sources only listed the Vandals, Alans and Sueves among the invaders, according to St. Jerome, who lived in Bethlehem around that time, Gepids also participated in the invasion. According to a scholarly theory, the westward migration of the Huns forced the tribes to flee from the Carpathian Basin and seek refuge in the Roman Empire. Whatever the exact sequence of events, the Middle Danube region was subsequently dominated by peoples from the east, associated with Goths and Huns.

Jordanes reported that Thorismund, King of the Ostrogoths, who was subjected to the Huns, "won a great victory over" the Gepids, but fell in the battle. Jordanes' report suggests that the Gepids were forced to accept the overlordship of the Ostrogoths, within the emerging Hunnic Empire. A treasure of gold jewels, which was found at Șimleu Silvaniei, was hidden in the first decades of the 5th century, most probably in connection with the struggles ending with the Gepids' subjection to the Huns, according to István Bóna.

The Gepid warriors fought on the side of the Huns during the next decades. According to Jordanes, Attila the Hun prized Ardaric, King of the Gepids, and Valamir, King of the Ostrogoths, "above all the other chieftains", who were subjected to the Huns, in the 440s, according to Jordanes. Goffart, sceptical of Jordanes, has suggested that "scattered evidence", including descriptions of Attila himself as a Gepid, suggests that Ardaric and the Gepids may have been more important than the Ostrogoths under Attila.

The Gepids' participation in the Huns' campaigns against the Roman Empire brought them much booty, contributing to the development of a rich Gepid aristocracy. Especially, the isolated graves of fifth-century aristocratic women evidence the Gepid leaders' wealth: they wore heavy silver fibulas on their shoulders, bead necklaces, silver bracelets, large gold earrings, and silver clasps on their clothes and belts. A "countless host" under the command of Ardaric formed the right wing of the army of Attila the Hun in the Battle of the Catalaunian Plains in 451. On the eve of the main encounter between allied hordes, the Gepids and Franks met each other, the latter fighting for the Romans and the former for the Huns, and seem to have fought one another to a standstill with 15,000 dead.

Attila the Hun died unexpectedly in 453. Conflicts among his sons developed into a civil war, enabling the subject peoples to rise up in rebellion. According to Jordanes, the Gepid king, Ardaric, who "became enraged because so many nations were being treated like slaves of the basest condition", was the first to take up arms against the Huns. The decisive battle was fought at the (unidentified) Nedao River in Pannonia in 454 or 455. In the battle, the united army of Gepids, Rugii, Sarmatians and Suebi routed the Huns and their allies, including the Ostrogoths. It was the Gepids who took the lead among the old allies of Attila, and establishing one of the largest and most independent new kingdoms, thus acquiring the "capital of esteem that sustained their kingdom for more than a century".

In the 5th century, Salvian listed the Gepids among the pagan peoples.

=== Kingdom of the Gepids ===
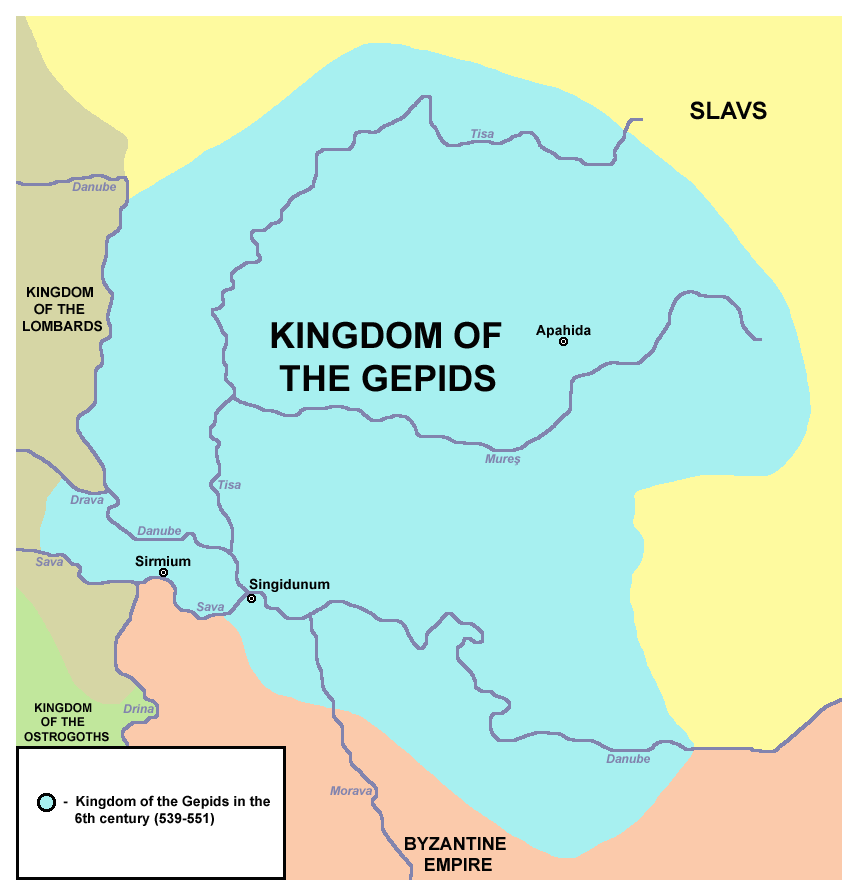
Gepidia at its largest territorial extent

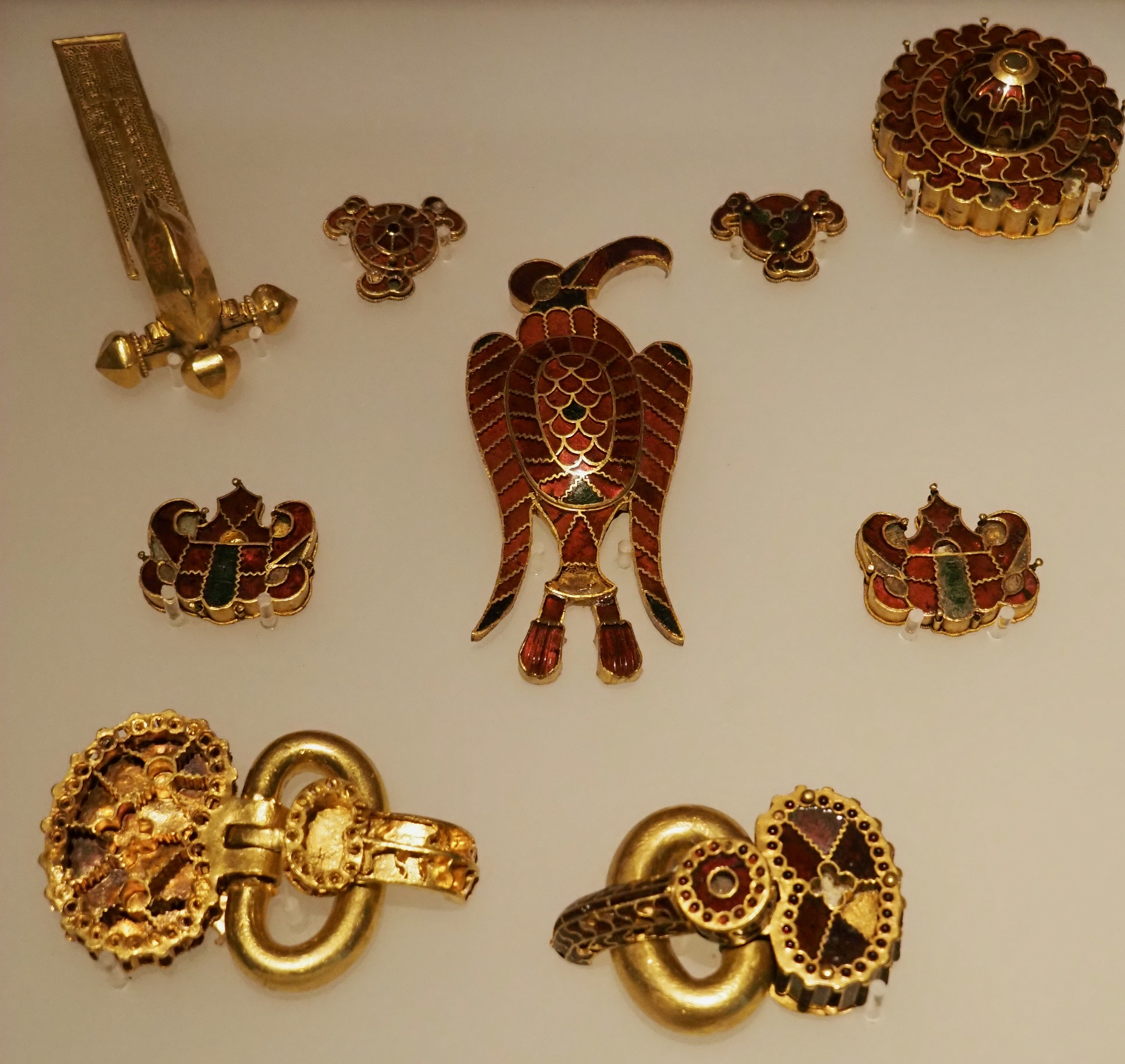
Selection of pieces from the second princely tomb of Apahida

After the Battle of Nedao, the Hunnic Empire disintegrated and the Gepids became the dominant power in the eastern regions of the Carpathian Basin. According to Jordanes, the Gepids "by their own might won for themselves the territory of the Huns and ruled as victors over the extent of all Dacia, demanding of the Roman Empire nothing more than peace and an annual gift" after their victory. Emperor Marcian confirmed their status as the allies of the empire and granted them an annual subsidy of 100 pounds of gold. The late-5th-century treasures excavated at Apahida and Someșeni show that the Gepid rulers accumulated great wealth in the second half of the century.

The Gepids joined a coalition formed by the Suebi, Sciri, Sarmatians and other peoples formed against the Ostrogoths who had settled in Pannonia. However, the Ostrogoths routed the united forces of their enemies in the Battle of Bolia in 469. After the Ostrogoths left Pannonia in 473, the Gepids captured Sirmium (now Sremska Mitrovica in Serbia), a strategically important town on the road between Italy and Constantinople.

In 489, Thraustila, King of the Gepids, tried to hinder the Ostrogoths from crossing the river Vuka during Theodoric the Great's campaign against Italy, but the Ostrogoths routed Thraustila's army. The Gepids also lost Sirmium to the Ostrogoths, according to Walter Pohl. In short, according to Walter Goffart, Thraustila's son, Thrasaric, "regained control of Sirmium but possibly under Ostrogothic underlordship". Theodoric the Great dispatched one comes Pitzia to launch a campaign against the Gepids who either tried to capture Sirmium or wanted to get rid of Theodoric's suzerainty in 504. Comes Pitzia expelled the Gepid troops from Sirmium without much resistance. For some time the Gepids relinquished from the city and built good relationship with the Ostrogoths under King Elemund. This safety attracted part of the Heruls to take refuge in Gepidia from the neighborhood of the aggressive Langobards. Wacho married Elemund's daughter in return.

In an attempt to take advantage of the death of Theodoric the Great in 526, the Gepids invaded the region of Sirmium in 528 or 530, but the Ostrogoths under Vitiges defeated them.

The Gepids reached the height of their power after 537, settling in the rich area around Singidunum (today's Belgrade). For a short time, the city of Sirmium (present-day Sremska Mitrovica) was the center of the Gepid State, and King Cunimund minted golden coins there. In 539, most of the Byzantine army was in Persia, so the Gepids and Heruls plundered Moesia, killing magister militum Calluc, while the Frankish king Theudebert I raided Northern Italy. According to Jordanes, the fighting was the bloodiest since the time of Attila, and the Romans were forced to pay heavy taxes and recognize new zones of Gepid occupation. Thurisind, the new king of Gepids, attempted to drive the Lombards out of Pannonia, and both peoples asked the Byzantines for help. Justinian I sent his army against the Gepids, but was routed along the way by the Heruli and the parties signed a two-year truce. To avenge what he considered a betrayal, Thurisind entered into an alliance with the Kutrigurs and Sclaveni, whom he ferried across the Danube to ravage Byzantine Illyricum and Moesia, before the truce expired and probably before the Gepids were ready to wage a new conflict.

Justinian I, angered by their expansion, entered into an alliance with the Lombards in 551, who, under the leadership of Alboin, son of Audoin, killed Turismod, son of Thurisind , and inflicted a disastrous defeat on the Gepids at the Battle of Asfeld in 552. After this, Alboin had a drinking cup made from the skull of Cunimund.

==== List of Gepid kings ====
- Fastida, fl. c. 250
- Ardaric, fl. c. 454
- Gunderit (not to be confused with Guntheric), Giesmus (after 485)
- Thraustila, fl. 488
- Thrasaric (Gothic puppet in the south), Guntheric (north)
- Elemund, ?–548
- Thurisind, 548–c.560
- Cunimund, c.560–567

=== Fall and last records ===
The Gepids were finally overrun by the Avars in the 567 Lombard-Gepid war. Many Gepids followed Alboin to Italy in 568 according to Paulus Diaconus, but many remained in the area of their old kingdom.

In 630, Theophylact Simocatta reported that the Byzantine Army entered the territory of the Avars and attacked a Gepid feast, capturing 30,000 Gepids (they met no Avars).

Recent excavation by the Tisza River at Szolnok brought up a Gepid nobleman from an Avar period grave who was also wearing Turkic-Avar pieces next to the traditional Germanic clothes in which he was buried.

In the eighth century, Paul the Deacon lists Gepid, Bulgarian, Sarmatian, Pannonian, Suabian and Norican villages in Italy but we do not know if Paul means in his own day or is simply lifting the phrase from an older source.

== Archaeological sites ==
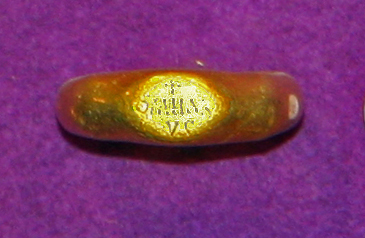
Gold ring with the inscription Omharus found at Apahida

Numerous archaeological sites have been attributed to the Gepids. The first scientific excavations of such an attributed Gepid site were done by István Kovács at Band in 1906 and 1907. However, attributing a precise ethnicity to archaeological findings from this period is a difficult and disputable method.

The analysis of the burial sites show that high-status burials with valuable goods are initially clustered in northwestern Transylvania (dated to the mid- and late fifth century), then in the sixth-century cemeteries primarily appear in the Hungarian Plain. The upper class of the Gepid society had access to Thuringian brooches, amber beads, or Scandinavian belt buckles, in particular visible in the female burials, pointing at close relations with Scandinavia, Thuringia, Crimea, and the Baltic coast.

In Vlaha, Cluj County, Romania, a necropolis was discovered in August 2004 with over two hundred tombs dated to the sixth century AD. Eighty-five percent of the discovered tombs were robbed in the same period. The remaining artifacts are ceramics, bronze articles and an armory. Also in Romania, at Miercurea Sibiului, there is another necropolis with rich artifacts. Other necropolises in Romania are:

- Morești, Mureș County
- Noșlac, Alba County
- Brateiu, Sibiu County
- Șeica Mică, Sibiu County
- Timișoara Freidorf site
- Apahida necropolis
- Turda: the richest Germanic tomb found in Romania is here. The "Franziska" tomb was found in a Roman site and dated to the fifth century AD.

Gepid treasures were also found at Someșeni and Șimleu Silvaniei.

== Genetic research ==
A 2022 study analyzed the mitochondrial DNA of Gepidian remains collected from three different sites located in Carei-Babold, Șardu, and Vlaha, in Transylvania, Romania. The results revealed that the main Gepidian ancestral component belonged to Northwestern European lineages, in line with historical and archaeological data. In particular, the authors found strong genetic similarities with samples from the Wielbark Culture, and with early medieval Anglo-Saxon and Lombard samples. Only one sample out of 46 carried an Asian lineage, indicating minimal geneflow from the Huns or other Asian populations into the Gepidian genepool.

A genome wide study published in Cell Press in December 2023 examined the remains of four individuals buried in what has conventionally been identified as a “Gepid” cemetery from Kormadin, Jakovo, Serbia, dated to the 5th century or later. The results revealed that two samples were likely of local Balkan origin, while the other two were shown to carry admixture from Central/North European and Sarmatian-Scythian ancestries. The authours suggest that admixture between Central/North European and Sarmatian-Scythian ancestries likely occurred beyond the frontier prior to the movement into the Roman Empire. The three extracted Y-DNA belonged to the following haplogroups: R-Z2124, E-FGC11457 and E-PH1173. The samples of mtDNA extracted belonged to haplogroups V7, H28, H5d and T1a1.

== See also ==
- Apahida necropolis
- Romania in the Early Middle Ages
- Goths
- Iapydes

== Sources ==
=== Primary sources ===
- Genethliacus of Maximian Augustus by an Anonymous Orator (291) (Translation and Notes by Rodgers) (1994). In: In Praise of Later Roman Emperors: The Panegyrici Latini (Introduction, Translation, and Historical Commentary with the Latin Text of R. A. B. Mynors by C. E. V. Nixon and Barbara Saylor Rodgers) (1994); University of California Press; ISBN 0-520-08326-1.
- The Gothic History of Jordanes (in English Version with an Introduction and a Commentary by Charles Christopher Mierow, Ph.D., Instructor in Classics in Princeton University) (2006). Evolution Publishing. ISBN 1-889758-77-9.

=== Secondary sources ===
- Bóna, István (1974). A középkor hajnala: A gepidák és a langobardok a Kárpát-medencében [The Dawn of the Dark Ages: the Gepids and the Lombards in the Carpathian Basin] (in Hungarian). Corvina Kiadó. ISBN 963-13-0491-4.
- Christensen, Arne Søby (2002). Cassiodorus, Jordanes and the History of the Goths: Studies in a Migration Myth. Museum Tusculanum Press. ISBN 87-7289-7104.
- Goffart, Walter (2009). Barbarian Tides: The Migration Age and the Later Roman Empire. University of Pennsylvania Press. ISBN 978-0-8122-3939-3.
- Heather, Peter (2010). Empires and Barbarians: The Fall of Rome and the Birth of Europe. Oxford University Press. ISBN 978-0-19-973560-0.
- Kharalambieva, Anna (2010). "Gepids in the Balkans: A Survey of the Archaeological Evidence". In Curta, Florin (ed.). Neglected Barbarians. Studies in the early Middle Ages, volume 32 (second ed.). Turnhout, Belgium: Brepols. pp. 245–262. ISBN 978-2-503-53125-0.
- Neumann, Günter (1998), "Gepiden §1. Namenkundliches", Reallexikon der Germanischen Altertumskunde, vol. 11 (2 ed.), Walter de Gruyter, ISBN 3-11-015832-9
- Opreanu, Coriolan Horațiu (2005). "The North-Danube Regions from the Roman Province of Dacia to the Emergence of the Romanian Language (2nd–8th Centuries AD)". In Pop, Ioan-Aurel; Bolovan, Ioan (eds.). History of Romania: Compendium. Romanian Cultural Institute (Center for Transylvanian Studies). pp. 59–132. ISBN 978-973-7784-12-4.
- Pohl, Walter (1998), "Gepiden §3. Historisches", Reallexikon der Germanischen Altertumskunde, vol. 11 (2 ed.), Walter de Gruyter, ISBN 3-11-015832-9
- Sarantis, Alexander (2009). "War and Diplomacy in Pannonia and the Northwest Balkans during the Reign of Justinian: The Gepid Threat and Imperial Responses". Dumbarton Oaks Papers. 63.
- Southern, Patricia (2001). The Early Germans. Routledge. ISBN 0-415-23944-3.
- Todd, Malcolm (2003). The Early Germans. Blackwell Publishing Ltd. ISBN 0-631-16397-2.
- Wolfram, Herwig (1988). History of the Goths. University of California Press. ISBN 0-520-06983-8.
