= Tisza plate =

Tectonic microplate, in present-day Europe

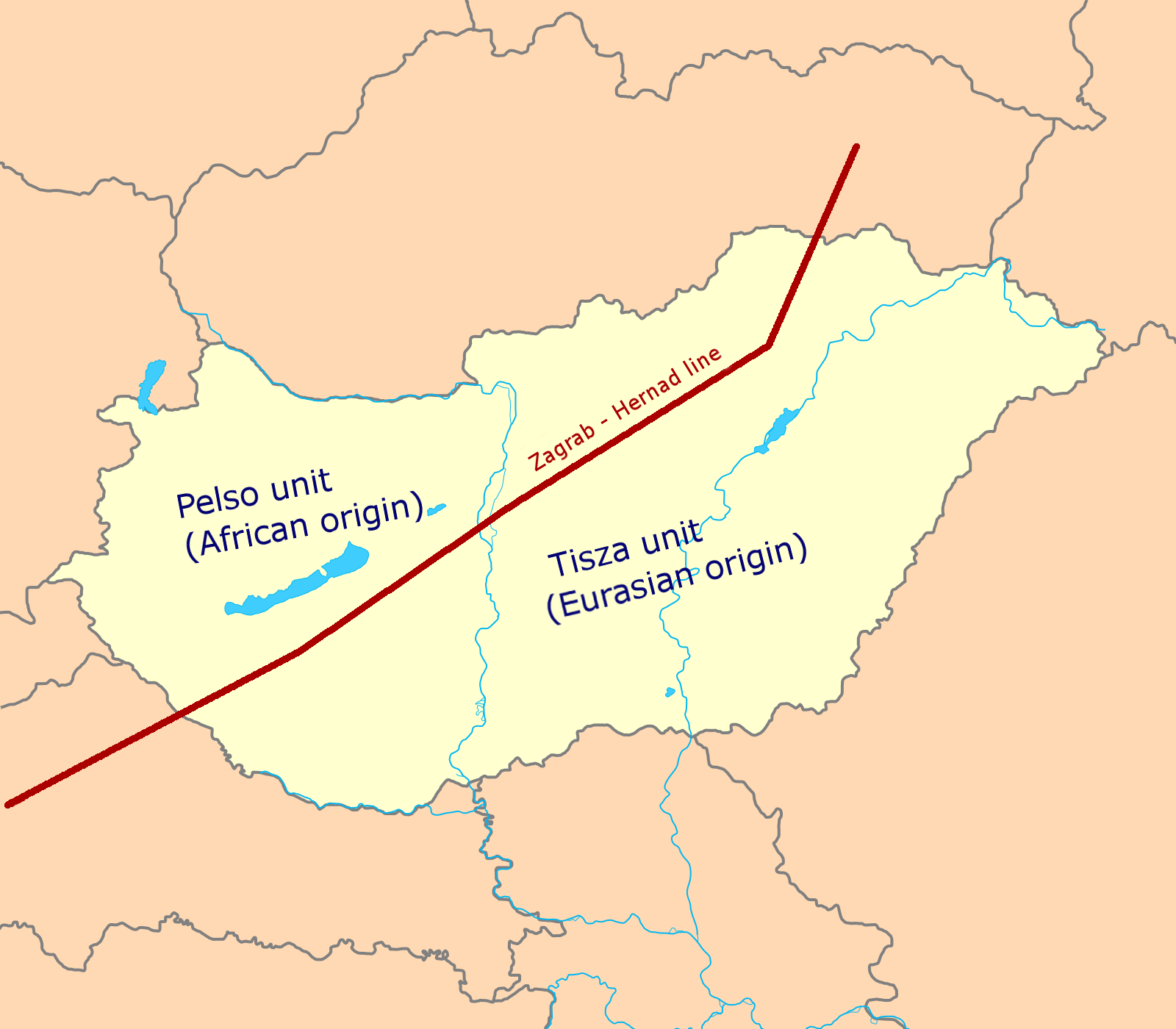
Pelso and Tisza units

The Tisza plate is a tectonic block, or microplate, in present-day Europe. The two major crustal blocks of the Pannonian Basin, Pelso and Tisza, underwent a complex process of rotation and extension of variable magnitude during the Cenozoic era. The northward push of the Adriatic Block initiated the eastward displacement and rotation of both the Alcapa (or Pelso) and Tisza blocks. The Zágráb-Hernád line is the former plate margin between the Pelso of African origin and the Tisza plate of Eurasian origin.
