= Battle of Sirmium (489) =

Date	August 489
Location	Sirmium, Kingdom of the Gepids
Result	Ostrogothic victory

Belligerents
Ostrogoths	Gepids

Commanders and leaders
Theodoric the Great	Thraustila

Strength
Unknown	Unknown

Casualties and losses
Unknown	Unknown

The Battle of Sirmium was fought at Sirmium, Kingdom of the Gepids, in August 489 between the Gepids and the Ostrogoths under Theodoric the Great. King Theodoric had recently been proclaimed King of Italy by Emperor Zeno, and in 489 began marching his men on route to invade Italy. While on his way to Italy King Thraustila of the Gepids opposed his plan of conquest and met in battle just outside of Sirmium. It is unknown how the exact battle played out, but it is certain that Theodoric defeated the Gepids. Thraustila was most likely killed in the battle or soon after. Theodoric in the same year invaded Italy and successfully overthrew Odoacer in 493. Tension continued to grow between the Gepids and the Ostrogoths, which would spark another war between Theodoric and Thrasaric from 504 to 505.

== Sources ==
- Tucker, Spencer C. (2009). A Global Chronology of Conflict: From the Ancient World to the Modern Middle East [6 volumes]: From the Ancient World to the Modern Middle East. ABC-CLIO. ISBN 978-1851096725.
- Goffart, Walter (2010). Barbarian Tides: The Migration Age and the Later Roman Empire. University of Pennsylvania Press. ISBN 978-0812239393.
- Hodgkin, Thomas (1891). Theodoric the Goth: The Barbarian Champion of Civilization. G. P. Putnam's Sons.
