= Apahida necropolis =

- Necropola de la Apahida (Romanian)
- Type: Tomb
- Periods: Late Antiquity/Migration Period
- Cultures: Roman Empire (current theory), Gepids (past theory)
- Location: Apahida, Cluj County, Romania
- Region: Transylvania

History
- Built: c. 475

Site notes
- Excavation dates: 1889, 1968

Monument istoric
- Official name: Celtic necropolis at Apahida
- Type: Cultural
- Criteria: II, B
- Designated: 2010

The Apahida necropolis is an archaeological site in Apahida, Romania. Two graves have been discovered and a third one may have existed. One of the graves was discovered in 1889 and its artifacts are currently in Budapest. The second was unearthed in 1968, 300 m from the first, during an excavation for the installation of concrete poles. Its grave goods are now on display in the National Museum of Romanian History. The second grave dates to c. 475 and was presumed to be the tomb of a Gepid king, based on the inscription on a gold ring called Omharus.

== The hoard ==
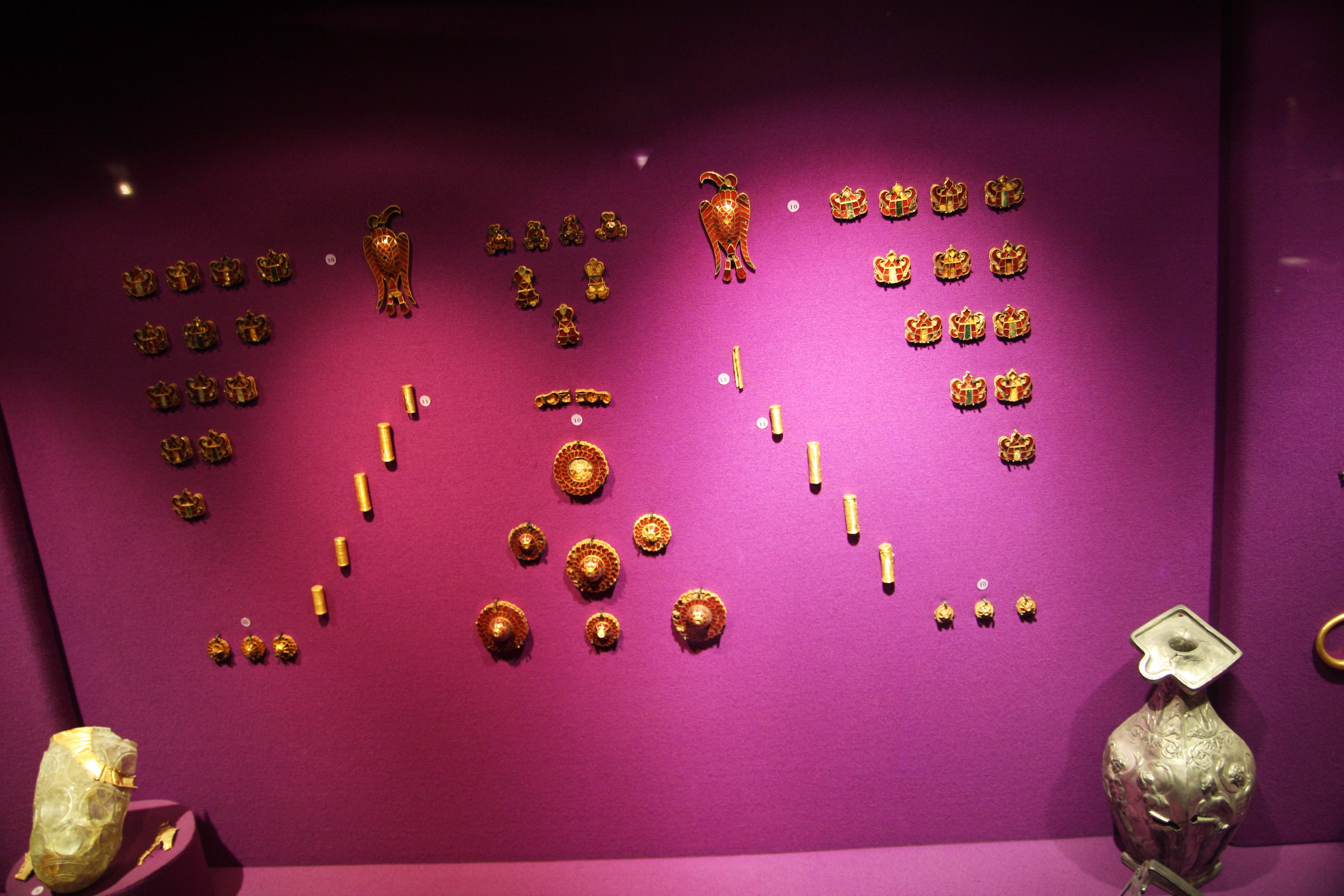
The hoard displayed in the National Museum of Romanian History

At Apahida, near Cluj-Napoca, three princely tombs attributed to the Gepids were found in 1889, 1968, and 1979 respectively. Located on the right bank of the Someșul Mic River and near the former Roman road that ran between Napoca and camps on Someș River (Gherla, Cășeiu, Ilișua), the tombs occupy an area no greater than 500 m^{2}.

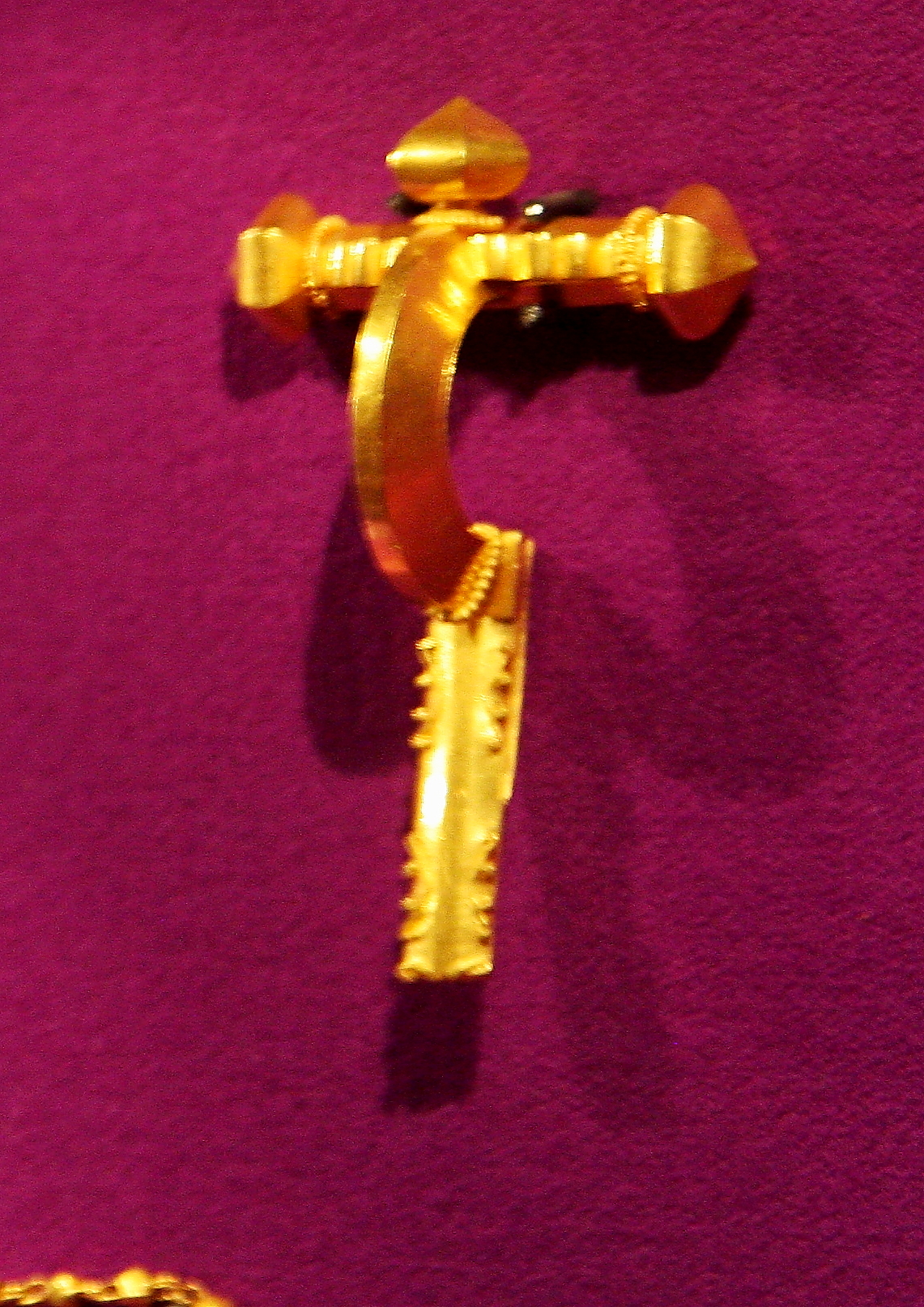
The fibulae of the thesaurus

The discovery of the first tomb in 1889 was made while taking gravel from a neighboring area of Apahida. Some of the artifacts were recovered for the Transylvanian Museum by H. Finály and another two pieces (a sealing ring with monogram and a pendant with bells) were purchased by the Hungarian National Museum on the antiquities market in 1897. From the inventory of the tomb were preserved many objects of gold, a cruciform brooch with onion-shaped cufflinks, a bracelet with thickened ends, three rings, a belt buckle and a second smaller buckle, five pendants with bells, two silver mugs, a gold band, and several appliques, probably used to decorate or repair vessels.

The second tomb discovery was made, also by chance, in October 1968 by workers digging the foundation for a transmission tower. Gold pieces with a total weight of approx. 900 g were found; of these the authorities were only able to recover 800 g when the discovery became public the following February, the rest having probably been melted down and used to make modern jewelry. During the excavations the upper part of the tomb was destroyed, leaving only the lower part thereof to be studied by archaeologists. The artifacts recovered by the Transylvanian History Museum in Cluj-Napoca were then transferred to Bucharest during the establishment in 1971 of the National Museum of History.

In 1979, a 6-year-old child discovered a large gold buckle in the earth excavated during the construction of the local post. The buckle is the only piece preserved from a third tomb. The piece was taken over in 1980 by the National Bank of Romania and in 2002 was transferred to the National Museum of History.

== See also ==
- Romania in the Early Middle Ages
- Kingdom of the Gepids

== Gallery ==
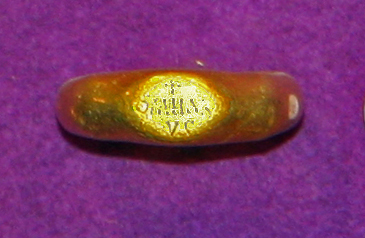
Gold ring of King Omharus

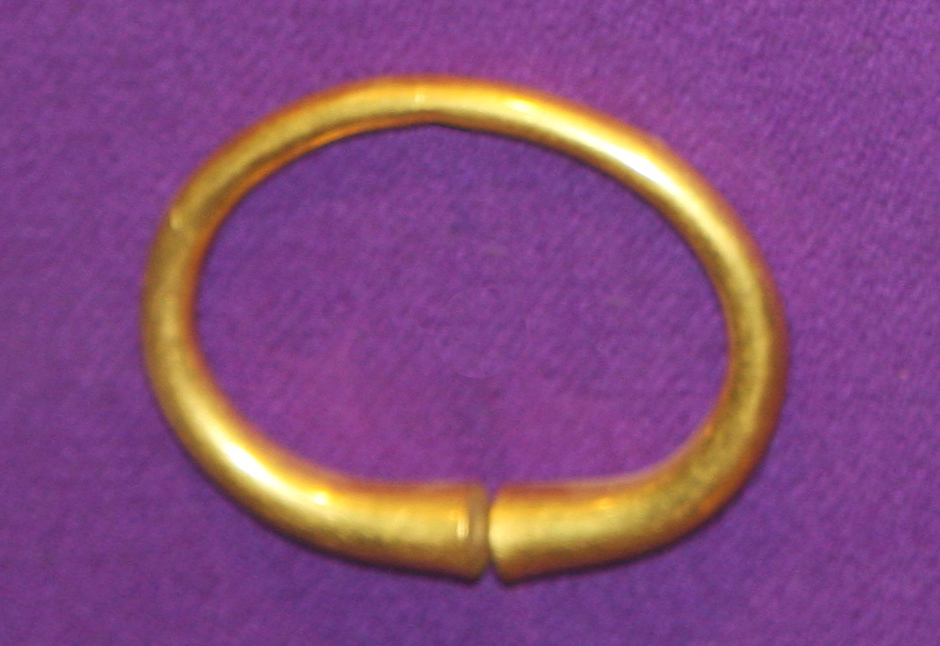
Gold penannular armlet with flared terminals, an insignia of the Gepid royal family

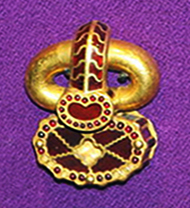
Belt buckle

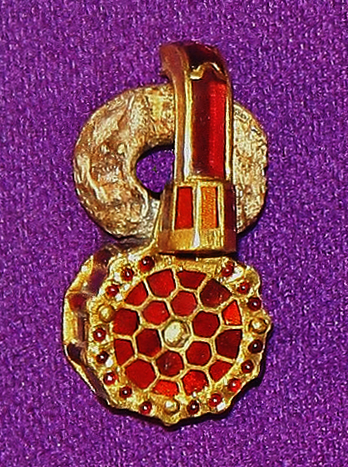
Belt buckle

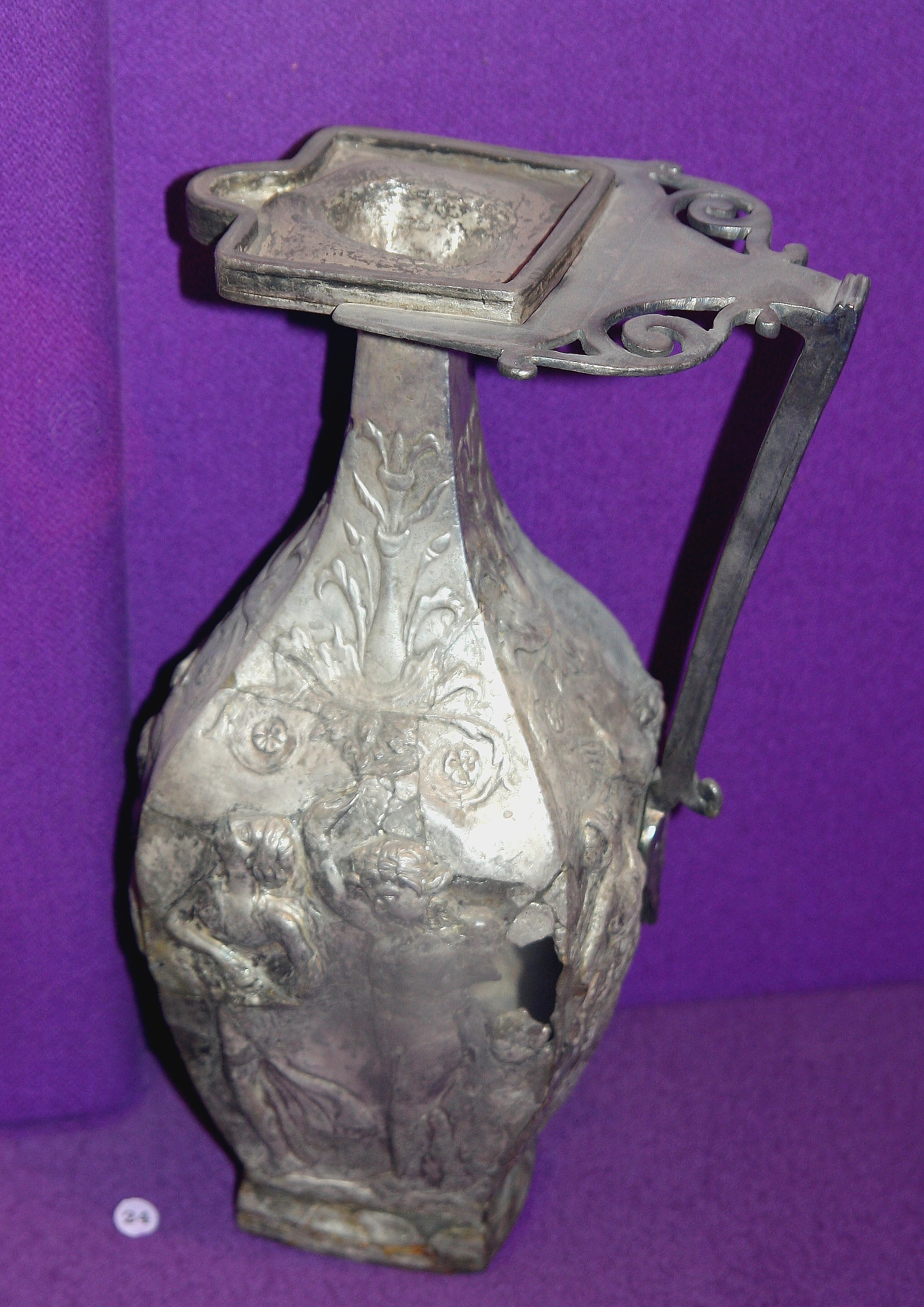
Late antique silver tankard from the grave of Omharus
