= Brateiu =

- Commune
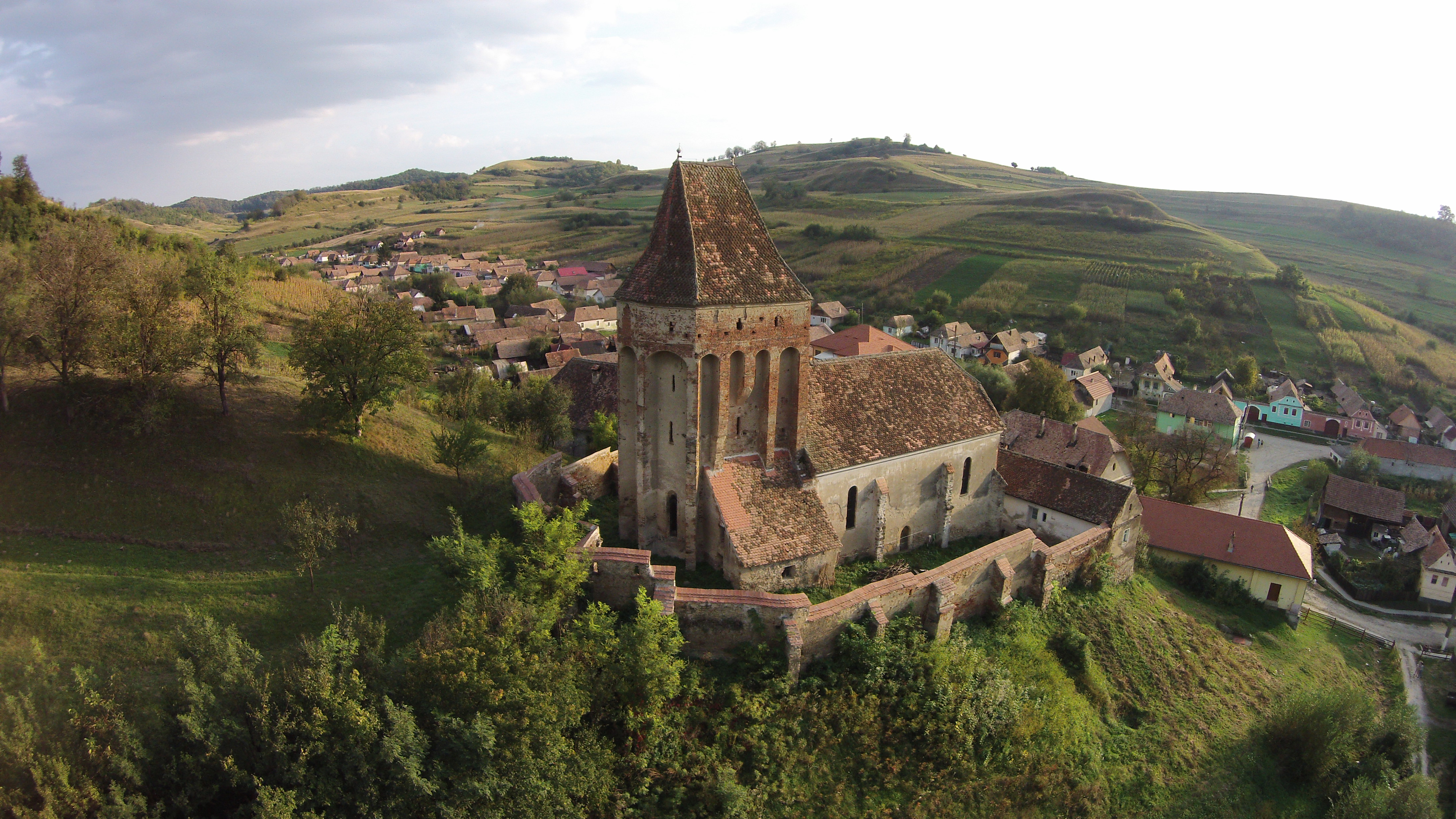
- The medieval Evangelical Lutheran Transylvanian Saxon fortified church at Brateiu/Pretai

- Coat of arms

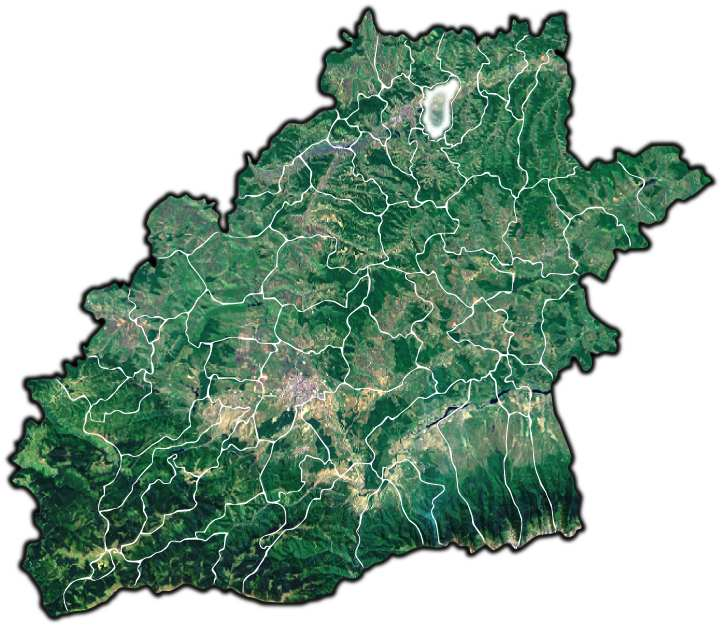
- Location in Sibiu County

- Location in Romania
- Coordinates: 46°10′16″N 24°25′30″E
- Country: Romania
- County: Sibiu

Government
  - Mayor (2024–2028): Elena Marian (Ind.)
- Area: 35.11 km^{2} (13.56 sq mi)
- Elevation: 319 m (1,047 ft)
- Population (2021-12-01): 3,333
  - Density: 94.93/km^{2} (245.9/sq mi)
- Time zone: UTC+02:00 (EET)
  - Summer (DST): UTC+03:00 (EEST)
- Postal code: 557055
- Area code: +(40) 0269
- Vehicle reg.: SB
- Website: primariabrateiu.ro

Brateiu (German: Pretai; Hungarian: Baráthely; Transylvanian Saxon dialect: Pretoa) is a commune located in Sibiu County, Transylvania, Romania. It is composed of two villages, Brateiu and Buzd, each of which has a fortified church. There is a big archaeological complex located here.

At the 2011 Romanian census, 57% of inhabitants were Romanians, 41% Roma, and 1% Germans (more specifically Transylvanian Saxons) and Hungarians each.

In Romanian	In German	In Saxon	In Hungarian
Brateiu	Pretai	Pretoa	Baráthely
Buzd	Bußd	Buss	Szászbuzd

== Gallery ==
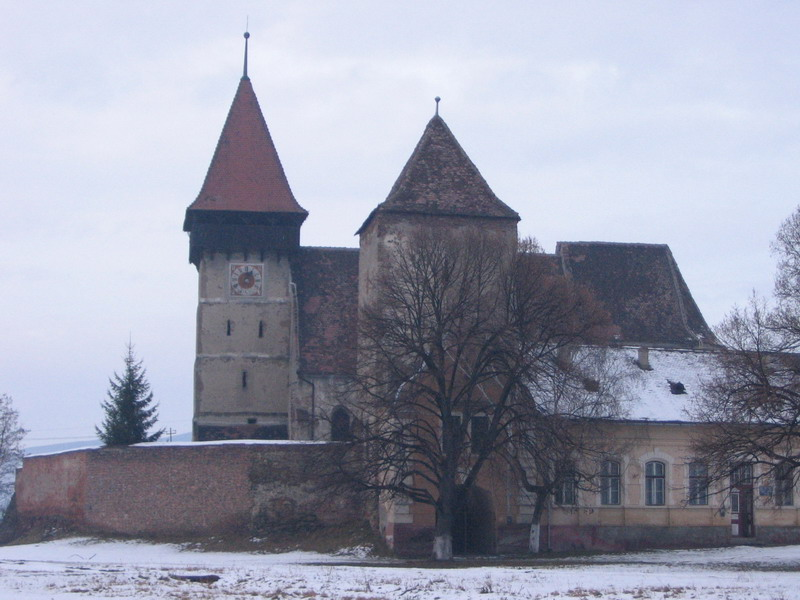
The medieval Evangelical Lutheran Transylvanian Saxon fortified church of Brateiu/Pretai in winter

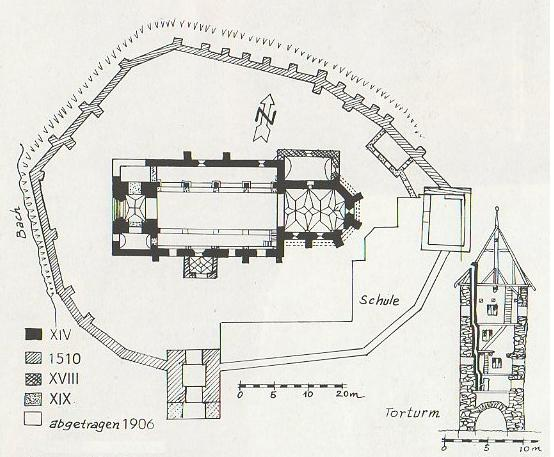
The plan of the medieval Evangelical Lutheran Transylvanian Saxon fortified church of Brateiu/Pretai

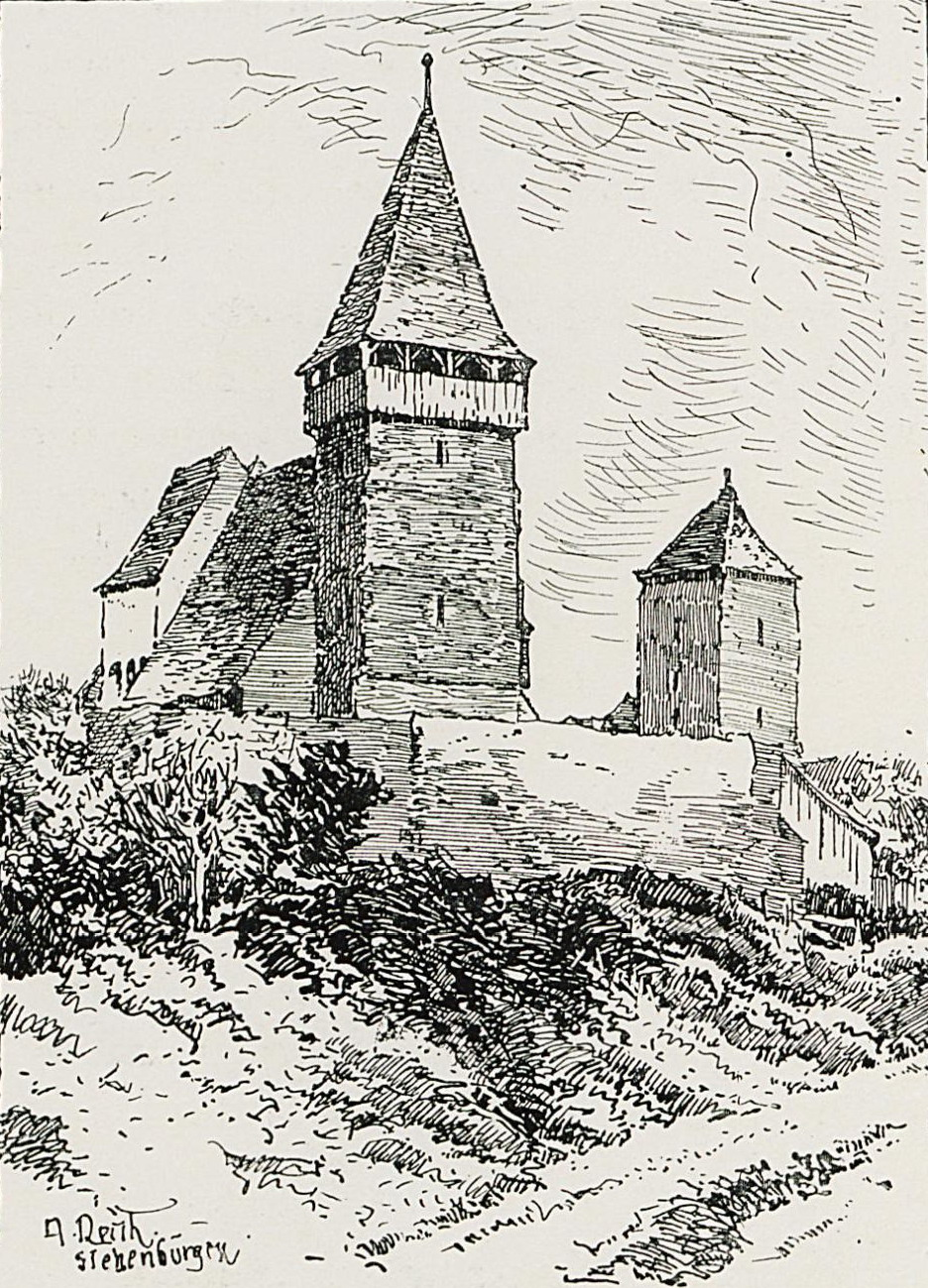
A sketch of the medieval Evangelical Lutheran Transylvanian Saxon fortified church of Brateiu/Pretai by Albert Reich
