= Elemund =

Elemund (Latin: Elemundus, died 548) was king of the Gepids, an east Germanic people, during the first half of the 6th century. He may have been the son of Gunderit, himself son of Ardaric ascended by overthrowing a rival Ardariking branch. Based on archaeological evidence, István Boná believes that in the 520s or 530s Elemund must have consolidated his power in Transylvania by submitting or removing minor Gepid rulers. Elemund had a son and daughter, Ostrogotha and Austrigusa, respectively; the latter was given in marriage to Wacho, the king of the Lombards, in 512. The reasons behind the marriage were multiple: on one side it protected the two kings from the threat represented by the Ostrogothic Kingdom, while on the other it reduced the danger represented to the Lombard king by Ildechis, a pretender to the Lombard throne. Wacho was eventually to remarry after Austrigusa's death, but this did not compromise the good relations existing between Lombards and Gepids. Elemund died of illness in 548 and was succeeded by Thurisind, while the legitimate heir was forced into exile. Ostrogotha found hospitality among the Lombards, but was killed in 552 by his host, King Audoin, as part of a plan to ease relations between Gepids and Lombards.
