= Veliki Rit, Banat =

Geographical subregion of Banat, Serbia

Coordinates: 44.92621°N 20.59306°E

Veliki Rit (Serbian Cyrillic: Велики Рит) is an area near the Bega river in central-eastern Banat, Serbia.

It is also known as the Alibunar Depression, from the town of Alibunar, and covers an area 30 km (19 mi) long and up to 11 km (6.8 mi) wide. It was formed in the epeirogenic movement, and was a marshland area until drainage works which began in the 18th century and culminated in the 1977 completion of the Danube–Tisa–Danube Canal.

A 1980 Directory of Wetlands of International Importance in the Western Palearctic reported that in 1974 a 500 ha (1.9 sq mi) area of Veliki Rit was "apparently established" as a reserve of zoological and limnological importance.
