= 552 =

Calendar year

552 in various calendars
Gregorian calendar	552; DLII
Ab urbe condita	1305
Armenian calendar	1 ԹՎ Ա
Assyrian calendar	5302
Balinese saka calendar	473–474
Bengali calendar	−42 – −41
Berber calendar	1502
Buddhist calendar	1096
Burmese calendar	−86
Byzantine calendar	6060–6061
Chinese calendar	辛未年 (Metal Goat); 3249 or 3042 — to — 壬申年 (Water Monkey); 3250 or 3043
Coptic calendar	268–269
Discordian calendar	1718
Ethiopian calendar	544–545
Hebrew calendar	4312–4313
- Hindu calendars
Vikram Samvat	608–609
Shaka Samvat	473–474
Kali Yuga	3652–3653
Holocene calendar	10552
Iranian calendar	70 BP – 69 BP
Islamic calendar	72 BH – 71 BH
Javanese calendar	440–441
Julian calendar	552; DLII
Korean calendar	2885
Minguo calendar	1360 before ROC 民前1360年
Nanakshahi calendar	−916
Seleucid era	863/864 AG
Thai solar calendar	1094–1095
Tibetan calendar	ལྕགས་མོ་ལུག་ལོ་ (female Iron-Sheep); 678 or 297 or −475 — to — ཆུ་ཕོ་སྤྲེ་ལོ་ (male Water-Monkey); 679 or 298 or −474

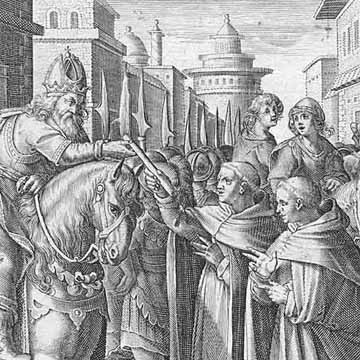
Emperor Justinian I receives the silkworms

Year 552 (DLII) was a leap year starting on Monday of the Julian calendar. The denomination 552 for this year has been used since the early medieval period, when the Anno Domini calendar era became the prevalent method in Europe for naming years.

== Events ==
- July 11 – The Armenian calendar is introduced.

=== By place ===
==== Byzantine Empire ====
- July 1 – Battle of Taginae: Narses crosses the Apennines with a Byzantine army (25,000 men). He is blocked by a Gothic force under King Totila near Taginae (Central Italy). In a narrow mountain valley, Narses deploys his army in a "crescent shaped" formation. He dismounts his Lombard and Heruli cavalry mercenaries, placing them as a phalanx in the center. On his left flank he sends out a mixed force of foot and horse archers to seize a dominant height. The Goths open the battle with a determined cavalry charge. Halted by enfilading fire from both sides, the attackers are thrown back in confusion on the infantry behind them. The Byzantine cataphracts (Clibanarii) sweep into the milling mass. More than 6,000 Goths, including Totila, are killed. The remnants flee, and Narses proceeds to Rome, where he captures the city after a brief siege.
- Emperor Justinian I dispatches a small Byzantine force (2,000 men) under Liberius to Hispania, according to the historian Jordanes. He conquers Cartagena and other cities on the southeastern coast.
- Justinian I receives the first silkworm eggs from two Nestorian monks at Constantinople. They were sent to Central Asia (see 550) and smuggled the precious eggs from China hidden in rods of bamboo.

==== Europe ====
- Battle of Asfeld: The Lombards under King Audoin defeat the Gepids.
- Cynric, king of Wessex, captures the fortress city of Old Sarum.
- The Roman Catholic Diocese of Meath is established in Ireland.
- Teia becomes the last king of the Ostrogoths in Italy.

==== Asia ====
- July 11 – First year of the Armenian calendar.
- Yuan Di succeeds Xiao Dong as emperor of the Liang dynasty.
- Bumin Qaghan dies; the new khagan is Issik Qaghan of the Turkic Empire.
- Buddhism in Japan is introduced, according to the Nihon Shoki.

=== By topic ===
==== Industry ====
- Smuggling of silkworm eggs into the Byzantine Empire by monks allows development of the Byzantine silk industry in the Empire.

==== Religion ====
- Eutychius becomes patriarch of Constantinople.

== Births ==
- Æthelberht, king (bretwalda) of Kent (approximate date)
- John the Merciful, patriarch of Alexandria (approximate date)

== Deaths ==
- February 5 – Dacius, archbishop of Milan
- July 1 – Totila, king of the Ostrogoths
- December 13 – Columba of Terryglass, Irish abbot and saint
- Aba I, patriarch of the Church of the East
- Anicius Maximus, Roman patrician
- Aratius, Armenian general
- Bumin Qaghan, ruler of the Göktürks
- Hou Jing, regent of the Liang dynasty
- Menas, patriarch of Constantinople
- Turismod, prince of the Lombards
- Wang Wei, chief strategist of the Liang dynasty
- Xiao Dong, emperor of the Liang dynasty
- Xiaojing, emperor of Eastern Wei (b. 524)
