= Thurisind =

- King of the Gepids
- Reign: c. 548–560
- Predecessor: Elemund
- Successor: Cunimund
- Died: c. 560
- Issue: Cunimund; Turismod

Thurisind (Latin: Turisindus, died c. 560) was king of the Gepids, an East Germanic Gothic people, from c. 548 to 560. He was the penultimate Gepid king, and succeeded King Elemund by staging a coup d'état and forcing the king's son into exile. Thurisind's kingdom, known as Gepidia, was located in Central Europe and had its centre in Sirmium, a former Roman city on the Sava River (now the town of Sremska Mitrovica, Serbia).

His reign was marked by multiple wars with the Lombards, a Germanic people who had arrived in the former Roman province of Pannonia under the leadership of their king, Audoin. Thurisind also had to face the hostility of the Byzantine Empire, which was resentful of the Gepid takeover of Sirmium and anxious to diminish Gepid power in the Pannonian Basin, a plain covering most of modern Hungary and partly including the bordering states. The Byzantines' plans to reduce the Gepids' power took effect when Audoin decisively defeated Thurisind in 551 or 552. The Byzantine Emperor Justinian forced a peace accord on both leaders so that equilibrium in the Pannonian Basin could be sustained.

Thurisind lost his eldest son, Turismod, in the Battle of Asfeld, during which the prince was killed by Alboin, son of Audoin. In about 560, Thurisind died and was succeeded by his remaining son Cunimund, who was killed by Alboin in 567. Cunimund's death marked the end of the Gepid Kingdom and the beginning of the conquest of their territories by the Lombards' allies, the Avars, a nomadic people migrating from the Eurasian Steppe.

== Early sources ==
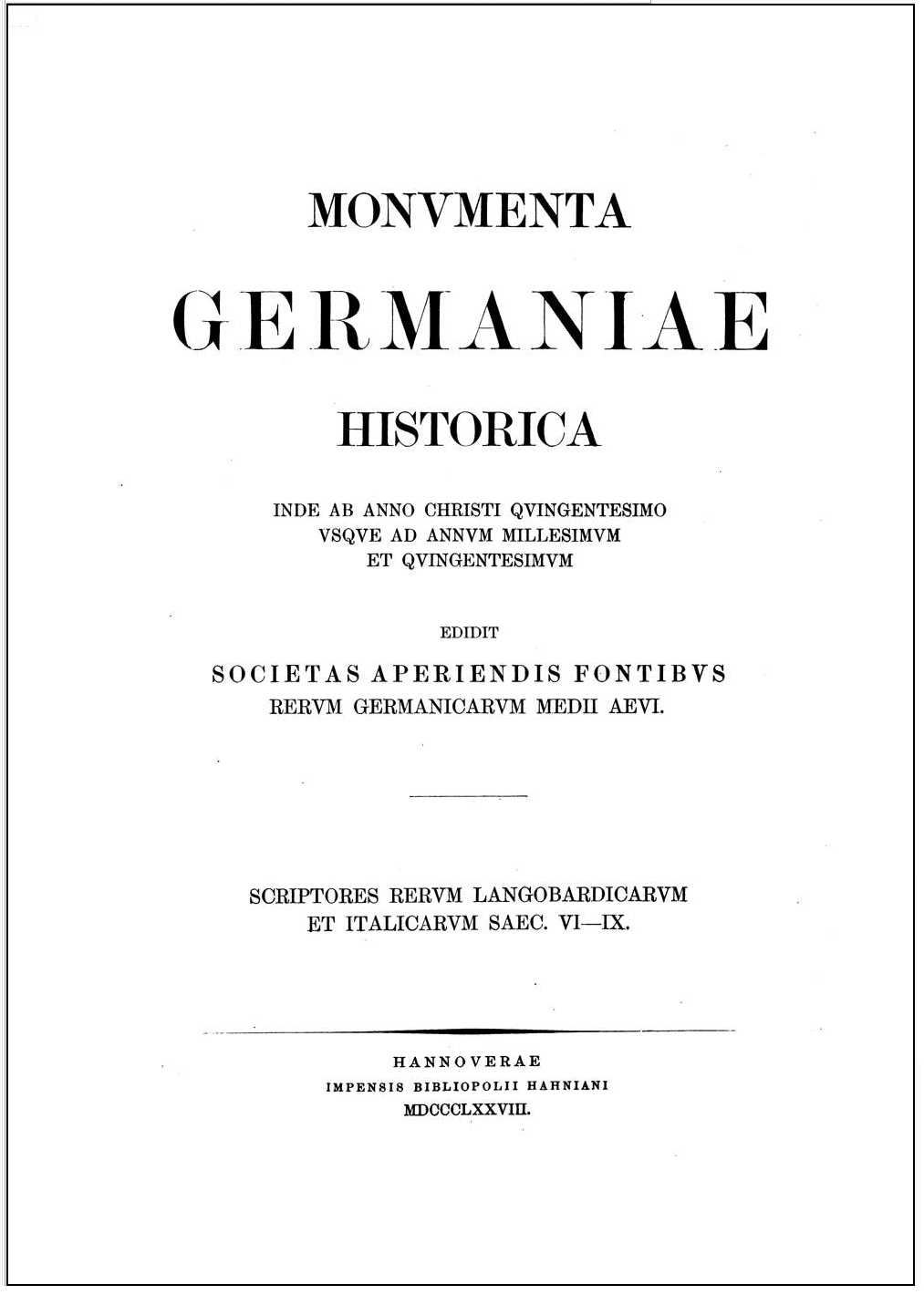
The Monumenta Germaniae Historica's critical edition of Paul the Deacon, a key source for Thurisind.

Of the four early medieval sources relevant to Thurisind that survive, the only one providing independent evidence of the king, accounts of Justinian's wars, and a detailed account of the relations between Gepids and Lombards and their kings is De Bellis (550s), the most important work of Procopius. Considered the greatest historian of the 6th century, Procopius was a Greek writer born in Caesarea in Palestine in 527. The Lombard–Gepid wars are well described in Procopius' work, as the conflict played an important part in the Byzantine plans to invade Italy by a land route.

Less relevant is the other 6th-century source, Jordanes' Romana. Of Gothic ancestry, Jordanes served as a notarius for a Byzantine Master of the Soldiers before entering into the ranks of the Catholic clergy and writing his two surviving books, the Romana and the Getica. The latter is a summary of Gothic history, while the lesser known Romana is an abridged account of Roman history written in 551 or 552. According to James O'Donnell, the two works share a pessimistic view of human life in which all secular accomplishments are insignificant compared to religious goals. Jordanes does not explicitly mention Thurisind in the Romana, but speaks of the third Lombard–Gepid War, in which Thurisind participated, in the last passages of the work.

Paul the Deacon was the most important Italian writer of the 8th century. Born in the 720s or 730s, he came from a noble Lombard family from Friuli. He entered the clergy early, and eventually became a monk of the monastery of Monte Cassino. His most famous work is the Historia Langobardorum, a history of the Lombard nation. Written after 787, it is a continuation of his previous major historical work, the Historia Romana, which was based on the Breviarium of Eutropius, with six books added describing historical events up to Justinian's empire. Both of these works mention Thurisind and the third Lombard–Gepid War, which represent the only overlap between the Historia Langobardorum and the Historia Romana. Both books also mention the duel between the kings' sons, an event which is absent in Procopius' writing and is thought to have originated through oral tradition. Similarly, the meeting between Thurisind and Audoin's son at the former's court derives from an oral source.

== Rise to power ==
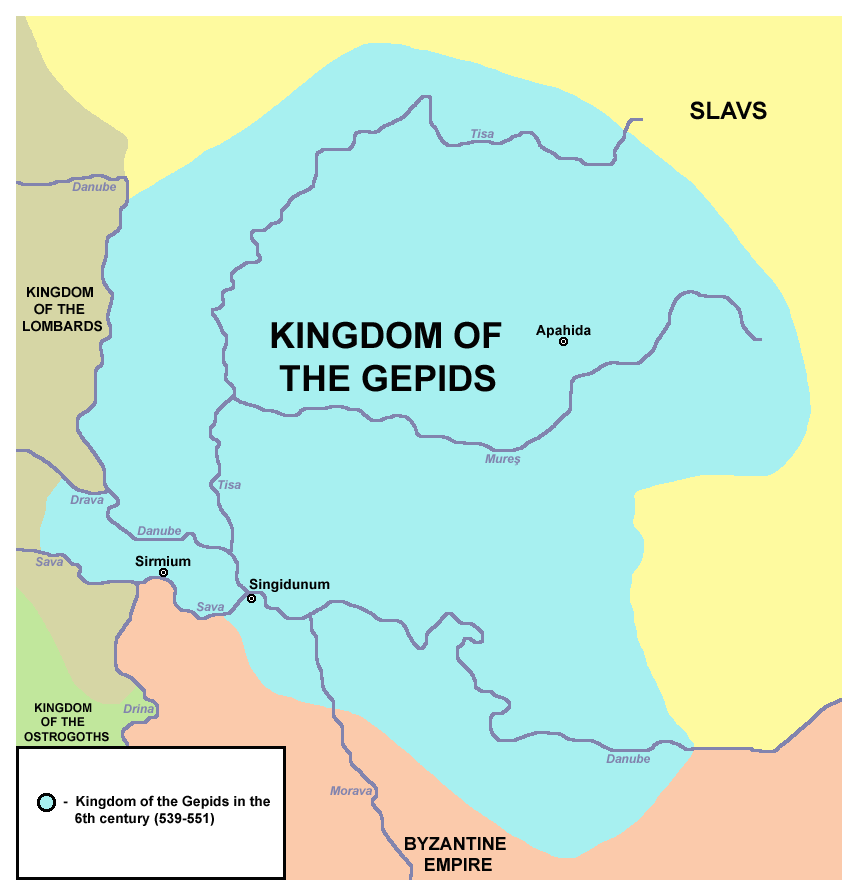
Territories held by the Gepids in the middle of the 6th century and the bordering powers. On the south stands the Byzantine Empire, while to the west are the Lombards.

The Gepids were a major Germanic people in what is now eastern Hungary, western Romania, and northern Serbia. Although the details of his early life are not known, Thurisind is believed to have risen to power in about 548. After the death of Elemund, the previous king, he seized the throne in a coup d'état and forced Elemund's son Ostrogotha into exile. Ostrogotha and his followers found refuge among the Gepids' neighbours and enemies, the Lombards, another Germanic people who had just settled in the western part of the Pannonian Basin. The Gepids had inhabited parts of the basin since the 3rd century. They reached prominence in the 5th century when, under King Ardaric, they played a key role in destroying the Hunnic Empire. Ardaric and his people benefited more than anybody else from this victory, gaining the former Roman province of Dacia.

In 504 the Gepids' power was significantly reduced by the Ostrogoths, who cut short their expansion into the Danubian plains. The Gepids restricted themselves to the eastern part of the Pannonian Basin; this was to form the core of Thurisind's dominions, just as it had under the previous Gepid kings. By the early 6th century, the Gepid nobility converted to Arian Christianity, while most of the Gepids remained pagans.

According to the scholar István Boná, Thurisind's rise to power is a typical example of the conflicts among the leading families for the kingship that plagued Gepidia in the 6th century and made it difficult to maintain the succession within the king's family. To contain these obstacles Thurisind made Turismod, his oldest son, commander of the Gepid forces in Sirmium, an important position that made Turismod the king's heir apparent (in early Germanic custom the eldest son was not necessarily the first in line of succession). After Turismod died, his younger brother Cunimund became commander in Sirmium and thus heir apparent.

== First war with the Lombards ==
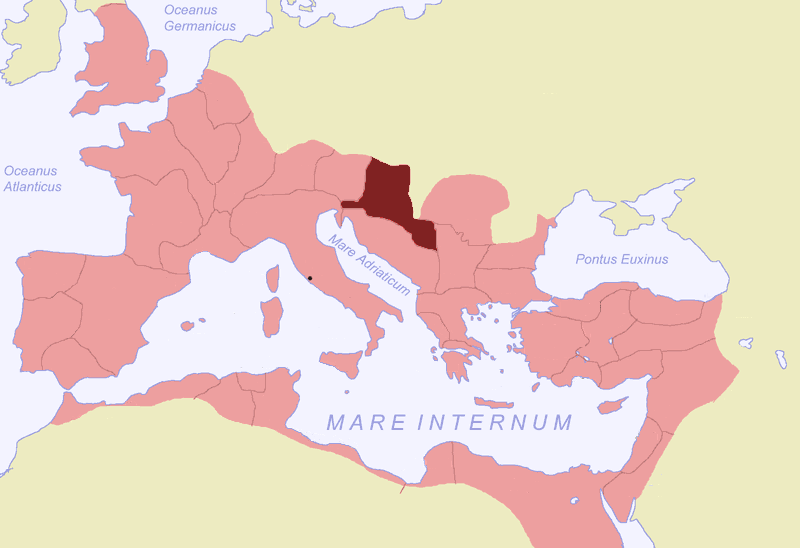
The highlighted borders of the province of Pannonia in the Roman Empire in the 2nd century

On becoming king in 548, Thurisind immediately found himself in a difficult situation. Sometime during 546–548, the Byzantine Empire had conspired to convince the Lombards under Audoin to move into Pannonia (modern Hungary), a former Roman province bordering the Danube river. Justinian hoped this would keep open the land route from the Balkans to Italy while containing the Gepids, who he considered a serious menace to Byzantine interests on the Balkan frontier. The Gothic War between the Ostrogoths and the Byzantines had been raging on the Italian peninsula since 535; Justinian wanted to be able to rush troops to Italy if they were needed.

According to the contemporary Procopius in the De Bello Gothico (the section of the De Bellis regarding the Gothic War), Justinian resented the takeover by the Gepids of the formerly Roman city of Sirmium in 537, which may have been voluntarily surrendered by the Ostrogoths to create difficulties for the Byzantines. The Ostrogoths were also occupied with the war in Italy and sought to retain their possessions in the peninsula. Sirmium's takeover was followed in 539 by a bloody confrontation between the Gepids and the Byzantines that had cost the latter the life of Calluc, their Master of the Soldiers, and also the loss to the Gepids of Dacia ripensis (Serbia) and Singidunum (Belgrade). Because of this, Justinian ended the alliance that had bonded the Gepids and Byzantines, and had ceased paying tributes to the Gepids, finding an enemy to set them against in the Lombards.

The build-up towards a war involving Lombards, Gepids, and Byzantines started possibly in 548 or 549, with Audoin and Thurisind each sending an embassy to Justinian's court at Constantinople, in attempts to obtain military support from Justinian or at least, in the case of Thurisind, to get a pledge of neutrality. To sway Justinian, Thurisind's envoys reminded him of their long tradition of alliance and promised to fight against Byzantium's enemies. However, the emperor sided with the Lombards; he made them formal allies and promised to provide troops against the Gepids. From Justinian's perspective, this war was of major importance in the larger context of the Gothic War, because possession of Pannonia was strategically necessary to keep open land communications between Italy and the Balkans.

Historians debate as to when the conflict started. Proposed dates for the first war are either 547 or 549. At the same time as the two peoples took the field, a 10,000-strong Byzantine horse army under the command of John, the magister militum of Illyricum, marched against the Gepids. Before John's arrival, Thurisind offered a truce to Audoin that was accepted. As a result, when the Byzantines arrived, the war had already ended, but not before they had clashed with the Gepids' Herulian allies. To seal the truce, Audoin demanded that Thurisind should give up Ildigis, a pretender to the Lombard crown who lived as a guest at his court. Thurisind refused, but he did force Ildigis to leave the Gepids and search for another refuge.

== Second Lombard–Gepid War and tensions with Justinian ==
"So the Gepaedes and the Lombards advanced in full force against each other, both being fully prepared for war. And the commanders were, on the side of the Gepaedes, Thurisind, and on that of the Lombards, Auduin ... But that fright which is called panic suddenly fell upon both armies and carried the men all backward in a flight which had no real cause, only the commanders being left where they were with a small number of men."
Procopius
De Bello Gothico, Book IV, Ch. 18

In either 549 or 550, the Gepids and Lombards again marched against each other but, according to Procopius, both armies panicked and no battle took place. As a result, a new war was avoided and Thurisind accepted Audoin's request for a two-year truce. According to István Boná, the panic may be linked to a natural phenomenon: a lunar eclipse took place on June 25/26, 549.

Confronted by an openly hostile Byzantine Empire, and faced with the eventuality that the war with the Lombards would be renewed at the truce's expiration, Thurisind searched for new allies as a way to pressure Justinian. He found assistance from the Kutrigurs, who he ferried across the Danube into the Byzantine Illyricum in 550 or 551, before the truce expired and probably before the Gepids were ready to precipitate a new conflict. In retrospect, it may be they arrived too late instead of too early, if the agreement had been made with the Second Lombard–Gepid War in mind.

Faced with the Kutrigur invasion, Justinian activated his alliance against the invaders, mobilizing the neighbouring Utigurs, who in turn asked for help from the allied Crimean Tetraxites. The latter invaded the Kutrigur homeland, taking advantage of the fact that many warriors were employed at that moment in the Balkans. Informed of the attack, the Kutrigurs were forced to leave the Balkans to defend their homeland on the north-western shore of the Black Sea.

Thurisind protected and promoted another enemy of Byzantium, the Sclaveni. As with the Kutrigurs, Thurisind used his control of the Danube to ferry Slavic raiders to and from Byzantine territory, and obtained payment from them in the process.

== Third Lombard–Gepid War ==
Justinian's plans to send expeditionary forces against the Ostrogoths in Italy were repeatedly hampered by Thurisind's initiatives. For example, Narses' army left Constantinople in April 551 for Salona, with hopes of finally defeating the Goths, but found itself blocked at Philippopolis (Plovdiv) by the Kutrigurs.

This brought Justinian to search for an accord with Thurisind to stop the trans-Danubian raids, and the latter was more than happy to accept. Thurisind's envoys asked for an alliance like the one bonding Byzantines and Lombards. In addition to strengthening the alliance, they demanded, and got, 12 senators to swear to uphold the treaty. After this, in 551, 400 Gepids were sent to fight in Narses' army, which was sent to Italy—a modest army compared to the 5,500 Lombards sent by Audoin and the thousands of Heruli.

When the truce expired in 552, Thurisind and Audoin again took to the field, and this time the clash was unavoidable. Audoin had reached an agreement with Justinian by which the Byzantines promised to send him military support in exchange for the 5,500 Lombards sent to help the Byzantine general Narses in the Emperor's war in Italy.

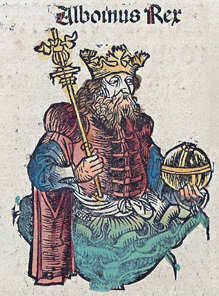
A tinted woodcut from the Nuremberg Chronicle, of Alboin, the slayer of Thurisind's son Turismod

The two-year truce was now close to expiry and the Lombards asked the Byzantines to respect the alliance which had been established between them. The Emperor found an excuse to break the new alliance with the Gepids by claiming they had again ferried Slav raiders. He put together an army with renowned commanders in its ranks such as Germanus' sons Justin and Justinian, Aratius, the Herulian Suartuas, and Amalafrid, brother-in-law of Audoin. A revolt that erupted in Ulpiana diverted the bulk of the army; only a force under Amalafrid reached the battlefield.

Scholars debate when the third Lombard–Gepid War started; it is agreed that it took place two years after the second war. The possible dates are either 551 or 552. The 551 date is upheld by those who argue that since in 552 Audoin had already dispatched 5,500 of his warriors to Narses' Italian campaign, the third Lombard–Gepid War must have already ended by then; against this scholars such as Walter Pohl protest that this is in contradiction with Audoin's reproaches to Justinian on the few troops sent against the Gepids, despite his massive support to Narses.

When the treaty expired, Audoin attacked the Gepids and Thurisind was crushed in the decisive battle of the Asfeld held west of Sirmium. The battle was mentioned by Jordanes in the Romana as one of the most bloody ever fought in the region, with no fewer than 60,000 warriors killed. The king's son Turismod also died, killed by Audoin's son Alboin in a duel that according to Paul the Deacon decided both the battle and the war. After the battle, the Gepids were never again able to play a formative role in the shaping of events.

== Peace ==
"The Gepidae ... strive to avenge the open insult ... The king leaping forth from the table thrust himself into their midst and restrained his people from anger and strife, threatening first to punish him who first engaged in fight, saying that it is a victory not pleasing to God when any one kills his guest in his own house. Thus at last the quarrel having been allayed, they now finished the banquet with joyful spirits. And Turisind, taking up the arms of Turismod his son, delivered them to Alboin and sent him back in peace and safety to his father's kingdom."
Paul the Deacon
Historia Langobardorum, Book I, Ch. 24

The Gepids' defeat caused a geopolitical shift in the Pannonian Basin, as it ended the danger represented by the Gepids to the Empire. The Gepids' utter defeat could have meant the end of their kingdom and its conquest by the Lombards, but Justinian, wanting to maintain an equilibrium in the region, imposed an "eternal peace" that saved the Gepids; it was observed for ten years, surviving both Thurisind and Audoin. It may be on this occasion, and not before the war, that Lombards and Gepids sent troops to Narses as part of the peace treaty imposed by the Byzantines. In this interpretation, the small number of Gepid warriors sent could be explained with the heavy losses taken in the war and the resentment felt towards Justinian. The Emperor also imposed some territorial concessions on Thurisind, obligating him to return Dacia ripensis and the territory of Singidunum.

To reach a complete peace Thurisind had first to deal with Ildigis who had found hospitality at Thurisind's court. Audoin demanded yet again to have him turned in, and Justinian joined in the request. Thurisind, despite his reluctance to resume the war with both Audoin and Justinian, did not want to openly breach the rules of hospitality and thus tried to evade the request by demanding in his turn to have Ostrogotha given to him; in the end, to avoid both openly giving in and at the same time renewing the war, both kings murdered their respective guests but kept secret their involvement in the act.

Thurisind features prominently in a tale told by Paul the Deacon set in 552, just after the death of the king's son Turismod and the end of the war. The story, generally thought to track its origins to an heroic poem dedicated to Alboin, revolves around the characters of Alboin and Thurisind: in accordance with a custom of the Lombards, to obtain the right to sit at his father's table, Alboin must ask for hospitality from a foreign king and have the latter arm him. To submit himself to this initiation, Alboin went with 40 companions to Thurisind's court.

Thurisind, in observance of the laws of hospitality, received Alboin and his companions and organized a banquet in their honour, offering Alboin the place where his dead son habitually sat. Following a mockery by Turismod's brother Cunimund and Alboin's rejoinder, a clash was avoided by Thurisind's intervention, who restored the peace and sent Alboin away with Turismod's arms. According to István Boná, who believes in the veracity of the story, the event may have taken place as described by Paul, but it also could reflect a secret peace condition imposed by Audoin on Thurisind under which the Gepid king had to arm his son's killer.

Thurisind died around 560 and was succeeded by his son Cunimund, last king of the Gepids; under him Thurisind's people were annihilated in 567 by a joint coalition of the Lombards and the Avars, a Turkic nomad people that in 558 had migrated to Central Europe. Cunimund was killed on the battlefield by the new Lombard King Alboin, and his daughter Rosamund was taken captive.
