= Usdibad =

6th-century Gepid commander

Usdibad (Latin: Usdibadus, Uzdibaldus; fl. 566–567) was a Gepid military commander (dux) and fugitive that received refuge by Byzantine Emperor Justin II (r. 565–574) during the Lombard–Gepid War (567).

In 566, Lombard king Alboin concluded a treaty with the Pannonian Avars, to whom he promised the Gepids' land in case they won over them. The Gepids were destroyed by the Avars and Lombards in 567. Gepid king Cunimund was killed by Alboin himself. The Avars now occupied "Gepidia", forming the Avar Khaganate. The Byzantine Emperor intervened and took control of Sirmium (now Sremska Mitrovica, Serbia), also giving refuge to Gepid leader Usdibad, but the rest of Gepidia was taken by the Avars. According to István Bóna, Usdibad was probably a secret rival of Cunimund, and crossed the Sava to the Byzantines after the defeat.

== Notes ==
1. The name is a Germanic dithematic name, formed by *uzda- and *-badwō (-badus). The second root is found in the names of other Eastern Germanic military leaders, such as Gepid Asbadus and Burgundian Gundibadus, and means "battle".

== Sources ==
- Bóna, István (1976). À l'aube du Moyen Age: Gépides et Lombards dans le bassin des Carpates. Corvina. ISBN 978-963-13-4494-3.
- Collins, Roger (2010). Early Medieval Europe, 300-1000. Palgrave Macmillan. pp. 201–. ISBN 978-1-137-01428-3.
- Schutz, Herbert (2001). Tools, Weapons and Ornaments: Germanic Material Culture in Pre-Carolingian Central Europe, 400-750. BRILL. pp. 81–. ISBN 90-04-12298-2.
