= Lombard–Gepid War (567) =

War in eastern Europe

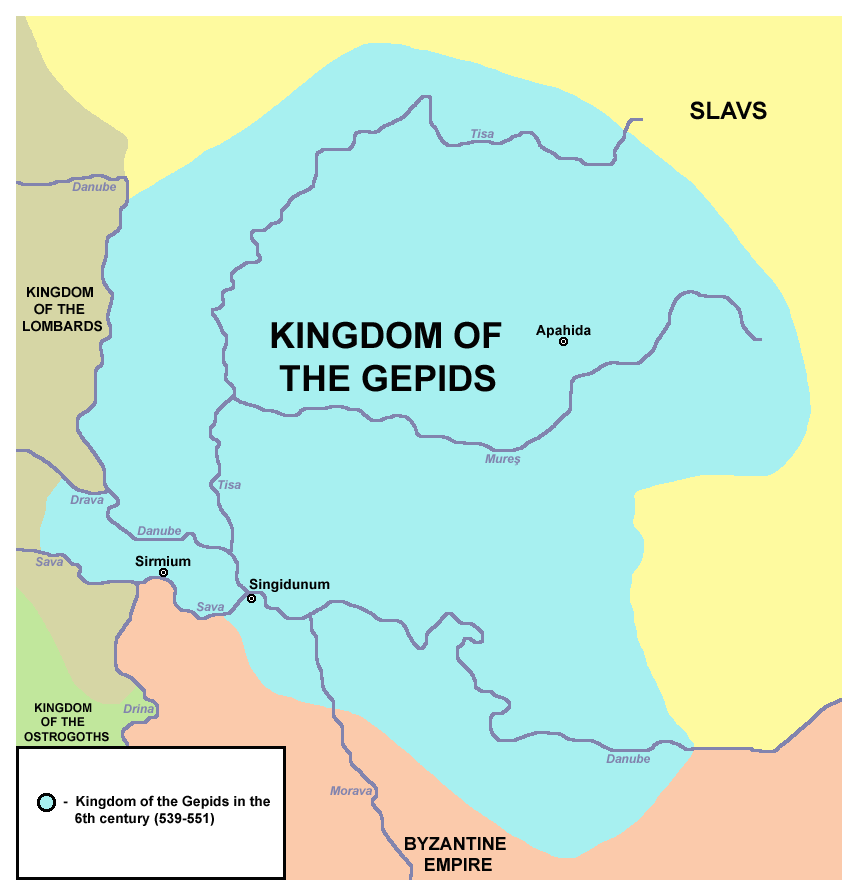
- Gepid kingdom (539–551)
Location	Kingdom of the Gepids
Result	Lombard–Avar victory; Avar conquest of Gepidia; Byzantine restoration in Syrmia

Belligerents
Lombards; Avar Khaganate	Gepid kingdom Byzantine Empire

Commanders and leaders
Alboin; Bayan I	Cunimund †; Usdibad; Baduarius

Casualties and losses
	Significant

In 566, Lombard king Alboin concluded a treaty with the Pannonian Avars, to whom he promised the Gepids' land if they defeated them. The Gepids were destroyed by the Avars and the Lombards in 567. Gepid King Cunimund was killed by Alboin himself. The Avars (led by their khagan Bayan I) subsequently occupied "Gepidia", forming the Avar Khaganate. The Byzantine Emperor intervened and took control of Sirmium (now Sremska Mitrovica, Serbia), also giving refuge to Gepid leader Usdibad, although the rest of Gepidia was taken by the Avars. Gepid military strength was significantly reduced; according to H. Schutz (2001) many of them joined Lombard ranks, while the rest took to Constantinople (the Byzantine Empire). According to R. Collins (2010) the remnants were absorbed either by the Avars or Lombards. Although later Lombard sources claim they had a central role in this war, it is clear from contemporary Byzantine sources that the Avars had the principal role. The Gepids disappeared and the Avars took their place as a Byzantine threat. The Lombards disliked their new neighbours and decided to leave for Italy, forming the Kingdom of the Lombards.

According to Lombard Benedictine scribe Paul the Deacon (720s–799), Cunimund's daughter Rosamund, who was taken hostage by the Lombards and taken by Alboin as his wife, suffered from his cruelty. He forced her to drink from the skull of her dead father (which he carried around his belt), inviting her "to drink merrily with her father".

== See also ==
- Battle of Asfeld (552)

== Sources ==
- Collins, Roger (2010). Early Medieval Europe, 300-1000. Palgrave Macmillan. pp. 201–. ISBN 978-1-137-01428-3.
- Foulke, William Dudley (1907). History of the Lombards [Historia gentis Langobardorum]. Philadelphia.
- Schutz, Herbert (2001). Tools, Weapons and Ornaments: Germanic Material Culture in Pre-Carolingian Central Europe, 400-750. BRILL. pp. 81–. ISBN 90-04-12298-2.
