= Battle of Asfeld =

552 battle

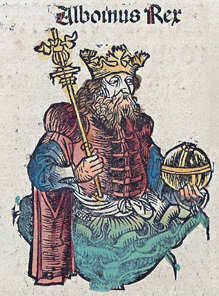
- Alboin, son of King Audoin; Alboin slew Thorismund in single combat during the battle
Date	552
Location	Asfeld?, Pannonia Secunda
Result	Lombard victory

Belligerents
Lombards	Gepids

Commanders and leaders
King Audoin; Prince Alboin	King Thorisind; Prince Thorismund †

Casualties and losses
Unknown	Heavy

The Battle of Asfeld was fought in 552 between the Lombards and the Gepids. The Lombards, led by King Audoin (with the help of his brother-in-law Amalafrid), were victorious, and, Turismod, the son of King Thorisind, was slain in the battle.

== See also ==
- Lombard–Gepid War (567)
