= Aratius =

6th-century Armenian military commander

- Birth name: Aratius
- Died: 552
- Allegiance: Sasanian Empire; Byzantine Empire
- Conflicts: Iberian War; Gothic War

Aratius (Greek: 'Αράτιος, died 552) was an Armenian military commander of the 6th century whose brother was Narses. He served at first the Sasanian Empire, then defected to the Byzantine Empire. He is primarily known for his activities in the Iberian War and the Gothic War. He was eventually killed in an ambush. Primary sources about him include Choricius of Gaza and Procopius of Caesarea.

== Biography ==
Aratius was a native of Persian Armenia. He was a brother of Isaacius (Isaac) and Narses. His brother should not be confused with the famous general Narses the Eunuch. Choricius of Gaza describes Aratius as originating from a good family and having distinguished brothers. He does not identify this family. Modern historians suggest that they could be part of the Kamsarakan family, also ancestral to Narses.

=== Iberian War ===
Aratius and Narses are first mentioned in 527. They were fighting for the Sassanid Empire in the Iberian War (526-532). The two of them managed to win a victory over the Byzantine commanders Belisarius and Sittas. The battle is briefly described by Procopius: "And the Romans, under the leadership of Sittas and Belisarius, made an inroad into Persarmenia, a territory subject to the Persians, where they plundered a large tract of country and then withdrew with a great multitude of Armenian captives. These two men were both youths and wearing their first beards, body-guards of the general Justinian, who later shared the empire with his uncle Justin I. But when a second inroad had been made by the Romans into Armenia, Narses and Aratius unexpectedly confronted them and engaged them in battle. These men not long after this came to the Romans as deserters, and made the expedition to Italy with Belisarius; but on the present occasion they joined battle with the forces of Sittas and Belisarius and gained the advantage over them."

In summer 530, Aratius and his brothers Narses deserted to the Byzantine Empire. They transported their mother with them. They were welcomed and rewarded by the eunuch Narses, a fellow Persarmenian. At the time this Narses was not yet a general, but a sacellarius. They were soon joined by Isaacius. Procopius narrates: "Narses and Aratius who at the beginning of this war, as I have stated above, had an encounter with Sittas and Belisarius in the land of the Persarmenians, came together with their mother as deserters to the Romans; and the emperor's steward, Narses, received them (for he too happened to be a Persarmenian by birth), and he presented them with a large sum of money. When this came to the knowledge of Isaac, their youngest brother, he secretly opened negotiations with the Romans, and delivered over to them the fortress of Bolum, which lies very near the limits of Theodosiopolis. For he directed that soldiers should be concealed somewhere in the vicinity, and he received them into the fort by night, opening stealthily one small gate for them. Thus he too came to Byzantium."

=== Palestine ===
Aratius resurfaces in 535/536, as Dux Palestinae, when Choricius composed a panegyric for both Aratius and the archon Stephen, the governor of Palestina. On 1 July 536, Stephanus was promoted to proconsul of Palaestina Prima (First Palestine). The panegyric was composed shortly before this promotion. The text includes mentions of Aratius' activities in the intervening years.

He is first credited with ending a revolt of religious dissenters in the vicinity of Caesarea. He was then supposedly able to do so without resorting to force. He is then credited as the strategos (general) responsible for capturing an enemy fortress, which was considered impregnable. Who were the enemy barbarians is left unclear, though they could have been hostile Arabs. He is thirdly mentioned leading a force of about 20 men in opening a pass which was held closed by Arab attacks. Again supposedly without a battle. He is next mentioning restoring Byzantine control over Iotabe (Tiran Island), previously occupied by neighbouring tribesmen. Aratius was finally able to locate the stronghold of these tribesmen on the mainland, attack it and capture it. He is particularly praised for the revenue brought in by Iotabe, through the customs paid there.

Choricius' flattering description features Aratius as an able man, merciful in administering justice and honest in financial matters.

=== Gothic War ===
Procopius next mentions Aratius in 538. He was sent to the Gothic War in the Italian Peninsula, leading a group of reinforcements for Belisarius. His title at the time is not recorded. He might have been a magister militum or a comes rei militaris. He probably arrived in the spring or summer of the year. He was reportedly ordered by Belisarius to set his camp near Auximum with 1,000 men. The town was a stronghold of the Ostrogoths and Aratius' mission was to keep watch over their activities.

Aratius spent the winter of 538–539 at Firmum, continuing his watch over nearby Auximum. He took part in the siege of Auximum in 539. He and his brother Narses were leading a force of Armenians during said siege. In 540, Aratius, his brother Narses, Bessas, and John fell out of favour with Belisarius and sent away from Ravenna. Belisarius and the eunuch Narses rivaled each other at the time. Belisarius, who chose Ravenna for his seat, suspected them of serving his rival. Belisarius was soon recalled from Italy. Aratius presumably continued fighting the Gothic War, but his activities over the following decade are mostly unrecorded.

=== Later years ===
His next prominent action was in 549. Aratius, Bouzes, Constantianus and John were tasked with leading a force of 10,000 cavalryman on a mission. They were to assist the Lombards in their conflict with the Gepids. This campaign was short-lived as the two opponents concluded a peace treaty, making the presence of Byzantine forces unnecessary.

In early 551, Aratius was one of the military commanders sent to face the South Slavs who were plundering the Balkans. Scholasticus was the overall leader of the campaign. The Byzantine forces suffered a major defeat in the vicinity of Adrianople. But later regrouped and won a victory. Their opponents departed the area. Later that year, Aratius is again mentioned as strategos. The Cutrigur Huns had invaded Byzantine territories, acting as agents of the Gepids. Justinian I sent Aratius to negotiate their retreat. The Byzantines informed them that the Cutrigur homeland had in turn been invaded by the Utigurs.

In 552, Aratius, Amalafrid, Justin, Justinian and Suartuas were sent on a new mission to the Lombards. They were to assist them against the Gepids. Amalafridas continued on the mission. But the rest were soon recalled by the emperor. Religious strife had broken out in Ulpiana and they were needed to restore order.

The Gothic War was still ongoing. In 552, Ildigisal and Goar invaded the Praetorian prefecture of Illyricum. Aratius, Arimuth, Leonianus and Rhecithangus were tasked with stopping them. All four commanders were ambushed while drinking at a river. They were easily killed.

== Sources ==
- Martindale, John R., ed. (1992). The Prosopography of the Later Roman Empire: Volume III, AD 527–641. Cambridge: Cambridge University Press. ISBN 0-521-20160-8.
- Procopius of Caesarea; Dewing, Henry Bronson (1914), History of the wars. vol. 1, Books I-II, Cambridge University Press
- Procopius of Caesarea; Dewing, Henry Bronson (1914), History of the wars. vol. 3, Books V-VI, Cambridge University Press
