= Turismod =

Turismod (Latin: Turismodus) was a son of the king of the Gepids Thurisind. He was killed in 551 or 552 on the battlefield by Alboin, son of the king of the Lombards Audoin.

Turismod was the oldest son of Thurisind and a brother of Cunimund; his sibling eventually succeeded their father in circa 560. Thurisind seems to have given to his eldest son the rank of commander of the Gepids in the city of Sirmium as a way to guarantee his succession to the throne, as this position made him heir apparent. He seems to have had a son, Reptila, who under the reign of Cunimund held Sirmium.

According to Paul the Deacon, he participated in the third Lombard-Gepid War; in 551 or 552 in the decisive battle of Asfeld he was slain there by Alboin, son of the king of the Lombards Audoin. His death was according to Paul the turning point of the battle, as when the other Gepids saw their leader dead they broke the ranks and escaped.

After the war, tells Paul who probably took the story from oral tradition, maybe an heroic lay dedicated to Alboin, Turismod's killer, Alboin, in order to obtain the right to become his father's table-companion as was customary to Lombards had to ask for the hospitality of a foreign king and have the king arm him; for this initiation he went with 40 companions to the court of Turismod's father Thurisind.

Thurisind, in observance of the laws of hospitality, lets Alboin and his companions participate to a banquet given in their honor offering Alboin the seat where Turismod habitually stood. Following a mockery by Turismod's brother Cunimund and Alboin's rejoinder, a clash is avoided just by Thurisind's intervention, who puts peace and sends away Alboin with Turismod's arms. According to István Bóna, who believes in the veracity of this story, the facts may have taken place as described by Paul but it also could reflect a secret peace condition imposed by Audoin on Thurisind under which the Gepid king had to arm his son's killer.
