= Amalafrid =

Amalafrid (Latin: Amalafridas, Greek: 'Αμαλαφρίδας) was the son of the last Thuringian king Hermanafrid and his wife Amalaberga, daughter of Amalafrida and niece of the Ostrogothic king Theodoric the Great.

After the fall of the royal Thuringian seat of Scithingi to the king of Metz, Theuderic I in 531, Amalaberga fled to the Ostrogothic king Theodahad, her brother, with Amalafrid and his sister Rodelinda. They were captured by the Byzantine general Belisarius and sent to Constantinople, together with the captured Ostrogothic king Witiges (or Wittigis). Justinian made Amalafrid a general and married off his sister Rodelinda to the Lombard king Audoin.

When the Lombards applied to the Byzantine Emperor Justinian I for help against the Gepids, he sent an army under the command of Justinus and Justinianus, the sons of Germanus; Aratius and Suartuas (a former ruler of the Heruli); and Amalafrid. All the former remained in Ulpiana, Illyria, to decide on a question of doctrine among the local Christians. Amalafrid led part of the Roman army against the Gepids. As Audoin afterwards sent envoys to Justinian to complain about the lack of Imperial help, this seems to have been only a small part of the original army. Nevertheless, Amalafrid and the Lombard host under Audoin won a major victory over the Gepids.

Amalafrid had a son named Artachis (see Venantius Fortunatus, Carm. App. 3) but nothing further is known of his fate.

== Sources ==
- Procopius, Gothic War VII, 25
- Venantius Fortunatus, Carm. App. 3
- Martindale, John R., ed. (1992). The Prosopography of the Later Roman Empire: Volume III, AD 527–641. Cambridge: Cambridge University Press. ISBN 0-521-20160-8.
