= Audoin =

King of the Lombards (r. 547–560)

Alduin (Langobardic: Aldwin or Hildwin, Latin: Audoinus; also called Auduin or Audoin) was king of the Lombards from 547 to 560.

== Life ==
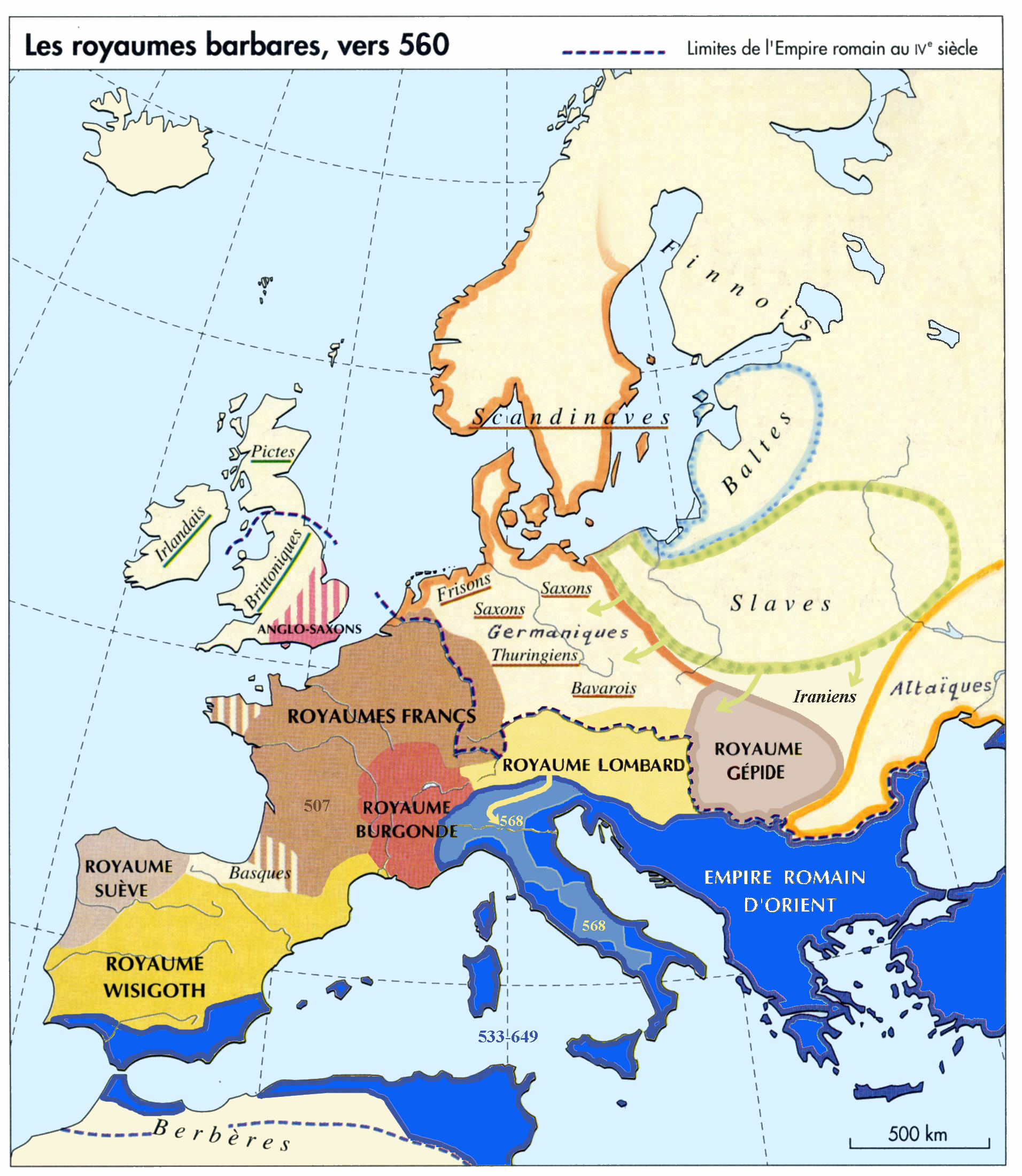
Map of Europe at the end of Audoin's reign; his kingdom is marked Royaume Lombard (Kingdom of the Lombards)

Audoin was of the Gausi, a prominent Lombard ruling clan, and according to the Historia Langobardorum, the son of Menia, the Lombard wife of Basinus, king of the Thuringii. Audoin was half-brother to Hermanafrid (king of the Thuringii peoples) and Raicunda, the wife of the Lombard king Wacho.

According to the Decem Libri of Gregory of Tours, in 531, Hermanafrid was defeated at the Battle of Unstrut, and so Thuringia was annexed to the Frankish empire. Hermanafrid traveled under safe conduct to meet with Theuderic at Zülpich. While walking along the city walls with Theuderic, Hermanafrid was thrown from the ramparts to his death.

According to Procopius (History of the Wars V, 13), after Hermanafrid's death, his widow Amalaberga fled with her children, Amalafrid and Rodelinda, to her brother Theodahad who was at that time (534–536) king of the Ostrogoths. Around 539, during the Gothic War, they were captured by the Byzantine general Belisarius and sent to Constantinople. Justinian I made Amalafrid a general and married off his sister Rodelinda to Audoin.

Around 540, Audoin was elected regent for Walthari, the minor son of King Wacho and his third wife Silinga. He led the Lombards to Pannonia, where they were settled by Justinian I and in 541 signed a treaty becoming fœderati of the Byzantines, entrusted with the task of securing the Danube border against the Franks. Audoin probably killed Waltari before he reached manhood, in order to gain the throne for himself around 546, and led the Lombards into Pannonia. After Walthari's death around 547, Audoin became king of the Lombards.

Beginning in 551, Audoin was obliged to send troops to serve Narses in Italy in the Gothic War against the Ostrogoths. The next year, he sent over 5,000 men to defeat the Goths on the slopes of Vesuvius. That same year Audoin had been able to inflict a heavy defeat on the Gepids with the help of his brother-in-law Amalafrid. The Gepid king Thurisind lost his eldest son, Turismod, in the Battle of Asfeld. Turismod was killed by Alboin, son of Audoin.

He died in 563 or 565 and was succeeded by his son, Alboin, who brought the Lombards into the Italian Peninsula.

== Notes ==
Regnal titles
Preceded by Waltari	King of the Lombards; 546–560	Succeeded by Alboin
