= Herbert Schutz =

German-born Canadian philologist (1937–2018)

- Born: February 25, 1937; Germany
- Died: January 1, 2018 (aged 80); Toronto, Canada
- Education: Central Technical School; University of Toronto
- Known for: Pioneering work on German language education and research on the history of Central Europe
- Scientific career
- Fields: Philologist
- Workplaces: Jarvis Collegiate Institute; Central Technical School; Brock University

Herbert (Herb) Schutz (February 25, 1937 – January 1, 2018) was a German-born Canadian philologist who was Professor Emeritus and Chair of the Department of Germanic and Slavic Studies/Modern Languages, Literatures and Cultures at Brock University.

== Biography ==
Herbert Schutz was born in Germany on February 25, 1937. He emigrated to Canada in 1951. Schutz graduated from the Central Technical School in Toronto in 1956. Schutz obtained his BA from the University of Toronto in 1959, where he studied Ancient, Near Eastern, and Modern History. Obtaining his teaching qualifications at the Ontario College of Education, Schutz taught at Jarvis Collegiate Institute and Central Technical School, where he was head of the French department and as assistant head of Moderns.

Obtaining his MA (1965) and PhD (1968) at the University of Toronto, Schutz taught at Brock University, where he became Professor in 1983. He subsequently served as Chairman of the Department of Germanic and Slavic Studies/Modern Languages and Literature at Brock University. Schutz retired as Professor Emeritus in 2003.

Schutz produced numerous works on the German language and literature. In the 1970s, he co-wrote German a Practical Approach, which was subsequently adapted to computerized language laboratory instruction, becoming a model for German grammar textbooks published in Canada. Schutz is well known for his 10 volume series on Central European History from Pre-history to 1300. These were produced through financial support from the Social Sciences and Humanities Research Council. The first volume of the series, The Prehistory of Germanic Europe, was published in 1983, with the reviewer for The American Historical Review writing that the book "should be read by anyone the least bit interested in the history of Europe".

Schutz was a founding member of the Ontario Association of Teachers’ of German, and served several years as Chair of the Niagara Chapter of the Canadian Institute of International Affairs and President the Ontario Modern Language Teachers’ Association.

Schutz died in Toronto on January 1, 2018. He was survived by his wife of 56 years, Dr. Alice Schutz, and his two children Dr. Andrea Schutz and Dr. Christopher Schutz, and his grandchildren.

== Selected works ==
- The Prehistory of Germanic Europe, 1983
- The Romans in Central Europe, 1985
- The Germanic Realms in Pre-Carolingian Central Europe, 400-750, 2000
- Tools, Weapons and Ornaments: Germanic Material Culture in Pre-Carolingian Central Europe, 400-750, 2001
- The Carolingians in Central Europe, 2004
- The Medieval Empire in Central Europe, 2010
- Mystic Women and Lyric Poets In Medieval Society, 2010
- Romanesque Architecture And Its Artistry In Central Europe, 900-1300, 2011
