= Ulpiana =

Justiniana Secunda - ancient Roman city located in what is today Kosovo

- Justiniana Secunda (after its reconstruction)
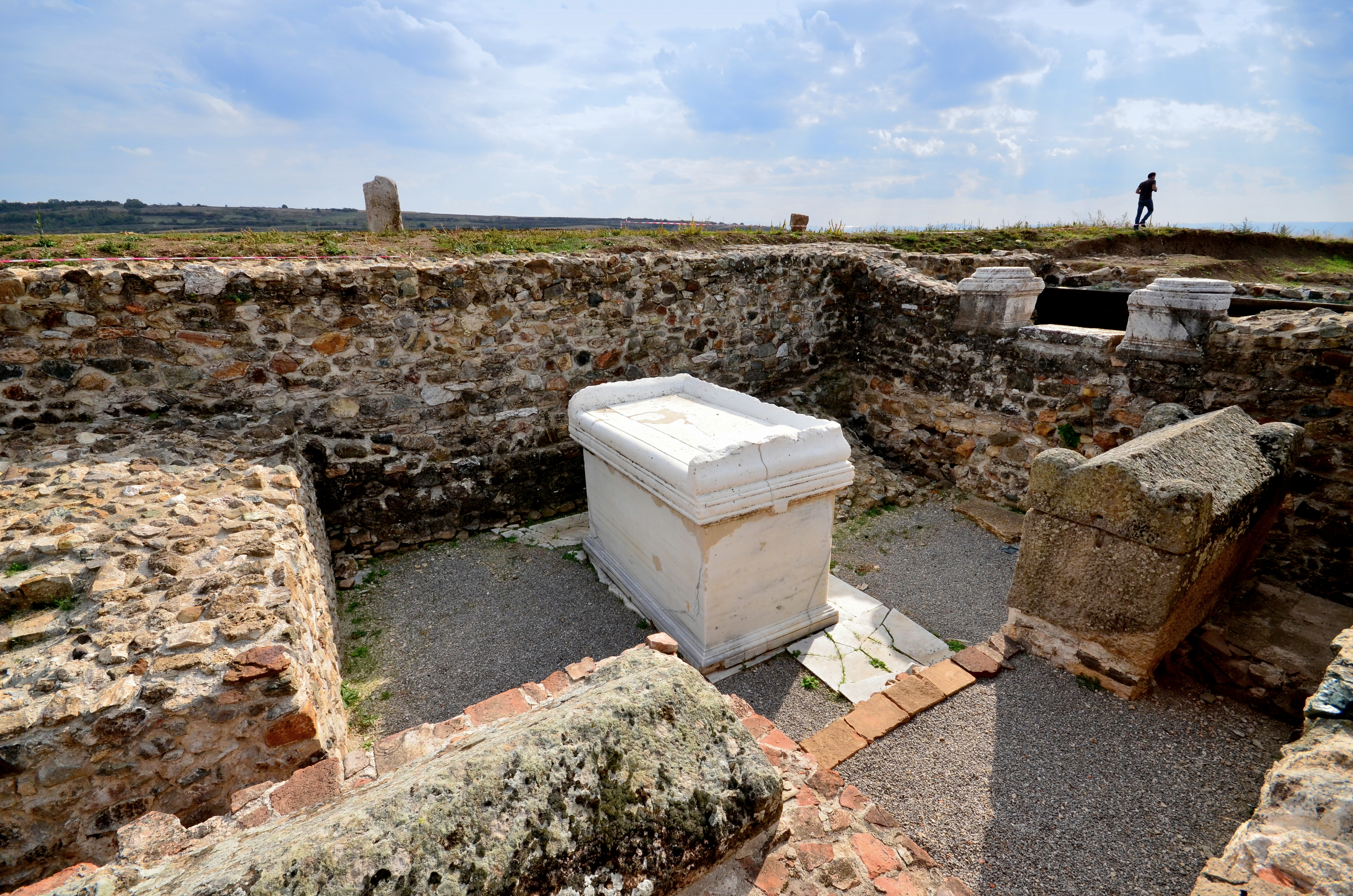
- Ulpiana excavation site.

- Ulpiana is located 12km to the southwest of Pristina. Ulpiana (Europe)
- Interactive map of Ulpiana
- 42.596281°N 21.175025°E
- Type: Roman city
- Periods: Classical antiquity to Early Middle Ages
- Cultures: Illyrian; Latin; Byzantine
- Location: Gračanica, Kosovo
- Region: District of Pristina
- Part of: Roman Empire; Byzantine Empire

History
- Built: 2nd century AD
- Built by: Trajan
- Event(s): 518 earthquake, raided during the Barbarian invasions, burned to the ground by Slavs in the 7th century

Site notes
- Area: 1.2 km^{2} (0.46 sq mi)

Cultural Heritage under Permanent Protection
- Official name: Municipum Ulpiana- Justiniana Secunda
- Type: Archaeological Heritage: Reservation
- Reference no.: 2120

Ulpiana was an ancient Roman city located in what is today Kosovo. It was also named Justiniana Secunda (Latin: Iustiniana Secunda, Albanian: Justiniana Sekunda, Serbian: Јустинијана Секунда). Ulpiana is located in the municipality of Gračanica, 12 km southeast of Pristina. The Municipium Ulpiana or Iustiniana Secunda was proclaimed an archaeological park under the permanent protection of Kosovo by the Kosova Council for Cultural Heritage in 2016. The archaeological park has an area of 161.10 hectares and a surrounding protection zone of 96.23 hectares. Ulpiana was among the largest settlements in the Balkans in late antiquity.

== Naming ==
Ulpiana was established at the site of an unknown Dardanian oppidum. It likely took its name from the Roman Emperor Trajan (Marcus Ulpius Traianus), during whose reign it was upgraded to the status of a municipium before the year 117. An earthquake in 518 destroyed the city, but emperor Justinian, who ascended to the throne in 527, ordered it to be rebuilt, renaming the city Justiniana Secunda, distinguishing it from Justiniana Prima, a city newly founded by Justinian in 535.

== Geography ==
Ulpiana lies in fertile land, near the left bank of the river Graçanka, located near mines that have been used since ancient times. The mines played a considerable role in the development of important cities in the Roman province of Dardania. The ruins of Ulpiana are located 12 km to the south-east of Pristina and the archaeological city is located in the villages Hajvali, Llaplesellë, and the town of Gračanica.

Geophysical research made by archaeologists has shown that there are more than 120 hectares worth of objects within the territory of the ancient town. There are two fortified parts of the city, with the first one consisting of an area of 35.5 hectares, and the second one, discovered in 2022, being about 19 hectares. To the north of the first area, there is a cemetery with a church built on top of it, known as the Northern Necropolis or Memoria. To the east of the city, there is a castrum, and to the northwest and south, there are two more necropolises, neither of which have been unearthed so far.

Ulpiana is located at the center of the Balkans and as such, it played a vital role in the region at the peak of its development. It was one of the main gravitational and communication centers between Rome and Constantinople and was located close to Via Lissus-Naissus and other roads that connected the Adriatic Sea to the Aegean Sea. Metal exports from Ulpiana have been found in 1993 as far as Caesarea in Israel. Amphoras with inscriptions from Ulpiana have been found in 2013 in Forli-Cesena in northern Italy. The amphoras were used to carry goods such as grain, wine, and olive oil, suggesting that Ulpiana's trade networks were vast.

== History ==
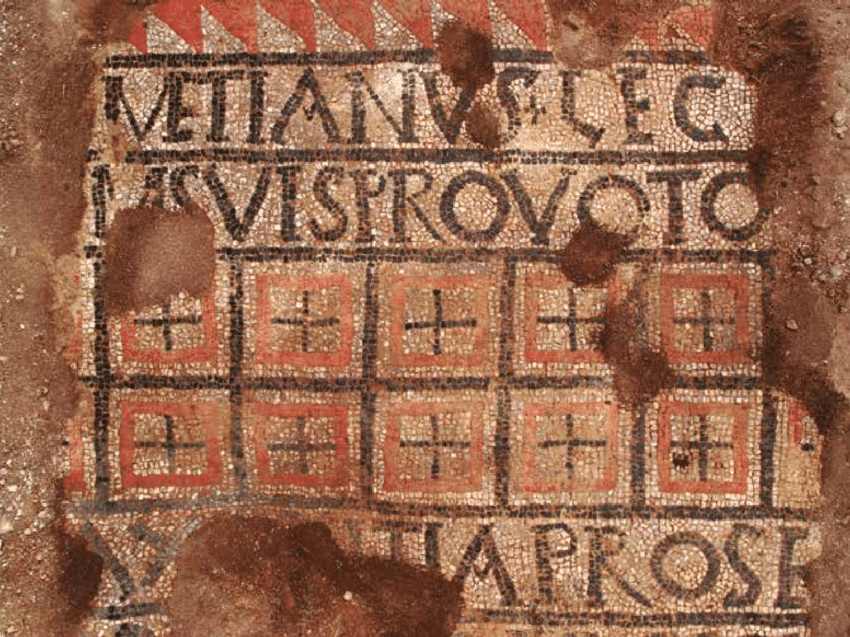
4th century mosaic with cross patterns and dedicatory inscriptions

Roman province of Dardania, with the administrative territory of the Municipium of Ulpiana shaded in green.

The city of Ulpiana was established in the 1st century AD, possibly developing from a concentrated Dardanian oppidum. Ulpiana was upgraded to the status of a Roman municipium at the beginning of the 2nd century. The upgrade to municipium took place during the rule of Trajan, before 117 AD and was named after the emperor. Ulpiana was an important city located along Via Lissus-Naissus and was very close to the Dardanian capital Scupi. It was also among the largest settlements in the Balkans of the late antiquity. It is located close to the gold and silver mines of Janjevo and Shashkoc and archaeological findings suggest that the city was inhabited even before Roman rule. The first known mention of Ulpiana in ancient sources was done by Ptolemy and dates back to the second decade of the 2nd century AD.

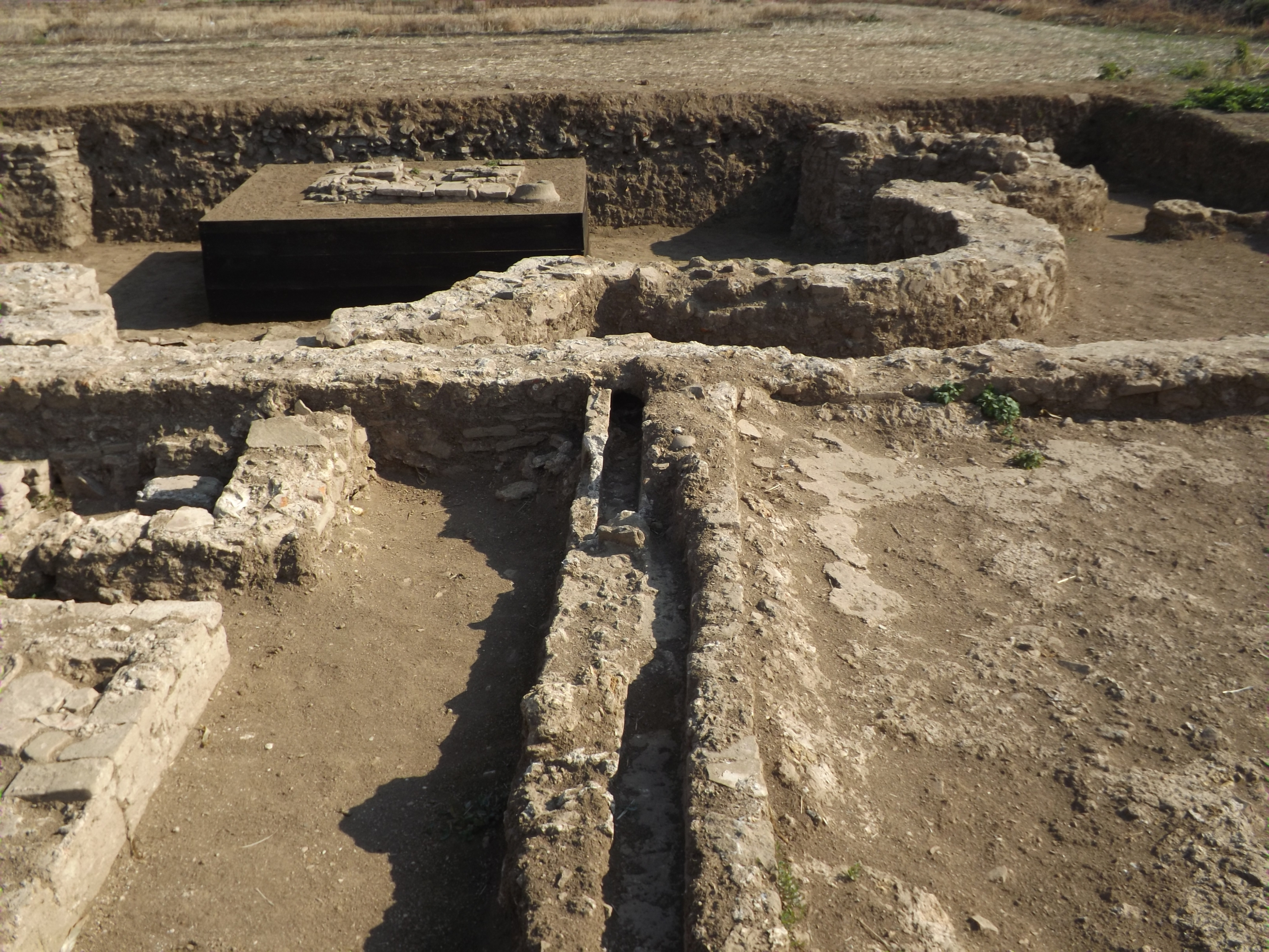
A view of the right pipe that brought water to the Baptistry of the Episcopal Basilica.

Ulpiana reached the peak of its development in the 3rd and 4th centuries AD, at some point becoming the episcopal center of Dardania and hosting the Archbishop of Dardania. During this time, Ulpiana was known as Municipum Ulpiana Splendidissima (the Magnificent City of Ulpiana) and served as an important political, cultural, and economic center of the Roman Empire in Dardania. It contained a Decumanus Maximus street network, living quarters, utility buildings, as well as an aqueduct, supplying water to each building. Its proximity to silver and gold mines made it an important mining and craftsmanship center.

Christianity started to flourish in the Balkans as early as the 1st century AD and had an important role in the development and importance of the city. The first mention of Christians in Ulpiana is the martyrdom of the brothers Florus and Laurus. They were originally from Constantinople and were building a pagan temple in Ulpiana when their Christian identity was deciphered and they were martyred. In the second half of the 4th century, before the invasion of the Goths, the seat of the bishopric of Dardania was placed in Ulpiana. The first known bishop of Ulpiana is Machedonius, who was a member of the council of Serdika. Other known bishops were Paulus (synod of Constantinople in 553 AD), and Gregentius, who was sent by Justin I to Ethiopia and Yemen to ease problems among different Christian groups there. Ulpiana remained the episcopal center of Dardania until the establishment of Justiniana Prima in 535 AD.

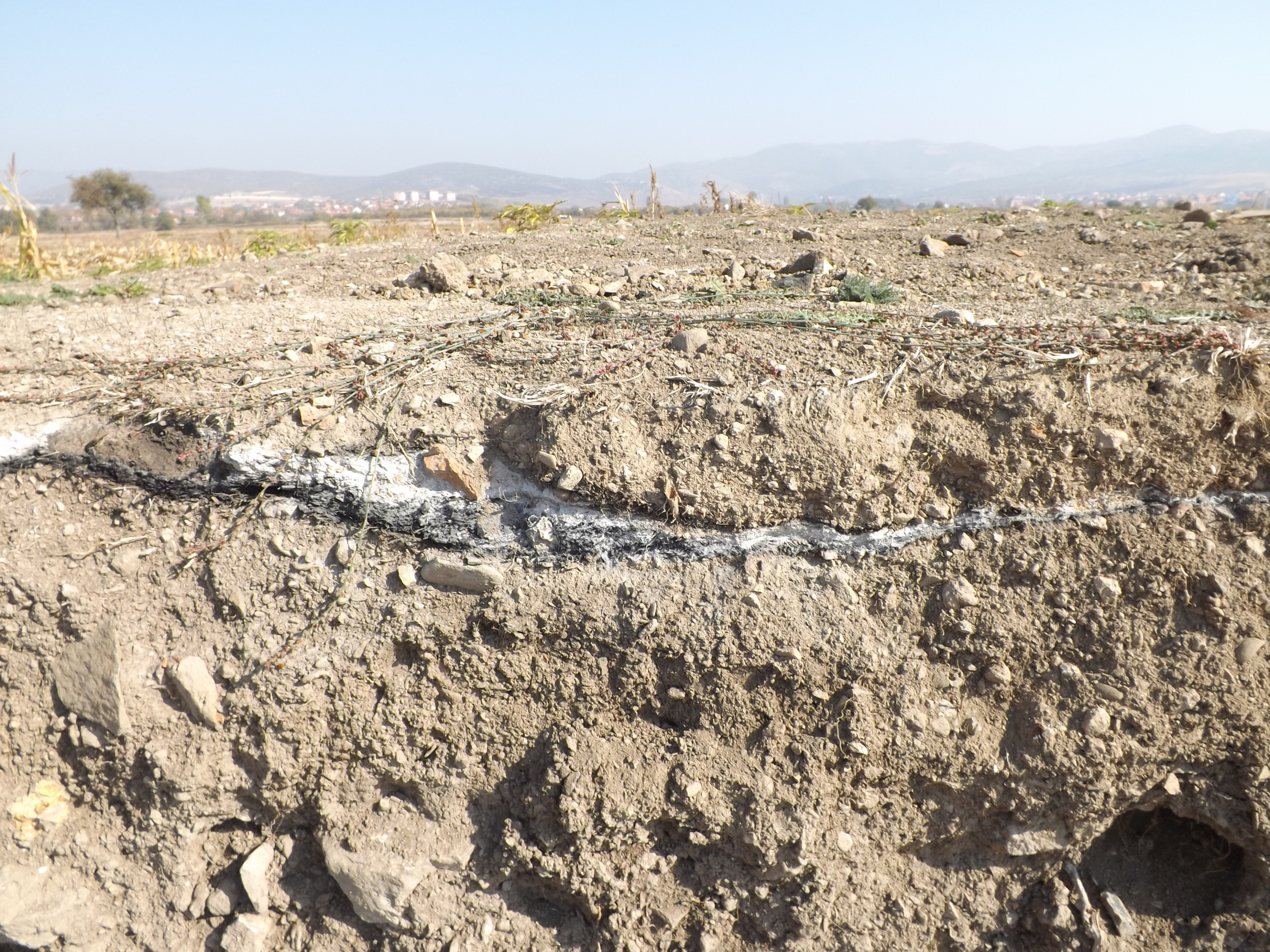
A layer of ash and carbon from the time the city was burnt down by the Slavs in the 7th-8th century AD.

Archaeological evidence suggests that after reaching its peak, Ulpiana shrank in the 5th and 6th centuries, due to natural disasters, as well as barbarian attacks during the weakening and subsequent fall of the Roman Empire. In 358 AD, Ulpiana was hit by the shockwaves of the devastating Nicomedia earthquake, resulting in some buildings being damaged. In 472 AD, King Theoderic the Great of the Goths attacked the city with 3,000 soldiers, plundering it and destroying parts of it. According to the chronicle and writings of Marcellinus Comes, Ulpiana was hit by another devastating earthquake in the year 518 that severely damaged Ulpiana and destroyed another 24 major cities in the region. Emperor Justinian rebuilt the city and its fortifications sometime after 535 AD and renamed the city to Iustinianna Secunda. Nevertheless, not long after, Ulpiana suffered from constant Avaric and Slavic attacks and after the latter invaded the Balkans in 618, they burned Ulpiana to the ground. Some sources say that afterward it became uninhabited, but other sources suggest that at least the northern church of the city and some other buildings continued to be used throughout the entire 7th century. Eventually, the city fell under ruins and its materials were reused for other constructions. The lower parts of the walls of the Gračanica Monastery were built with gravestones from Ulpiana. The epitaphs are still visible today.

== Archaeology ==
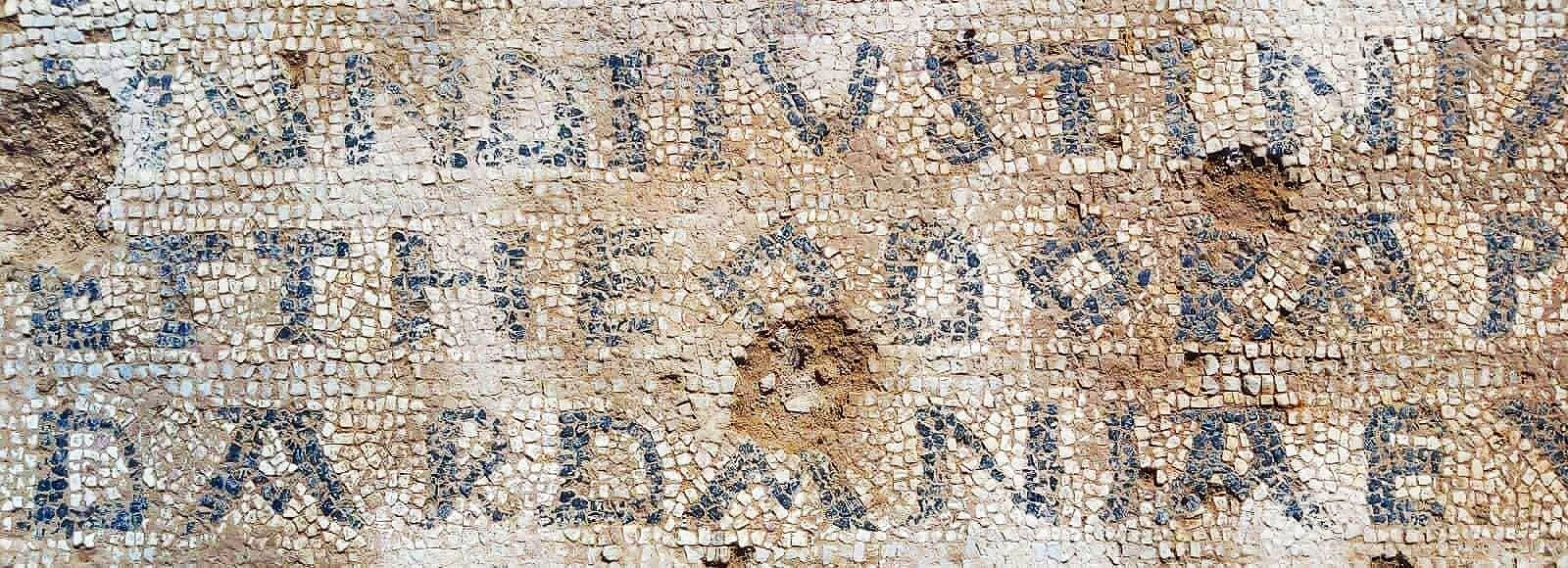
Mosaic dedicated to Emperor Justinian, unearthed in 2023

Despite being mentioned in historical documents since the 2nd century AD, the location of Ulpiana was not known in modern times until after World War II. There were rumors that the city was related to Lipjan due to the similarities in their names and the finding of some old artifacts in Lipjan, but the evidence was lacking. In 1953, the finding of four graves in the northern part of the cemetery finally confirmed the location of Ulpiana. Excavations started immediately and the first stage of excavations lasted between 1954 and 1959. The second stage of excavations took place in the 1980s and 1990s, followed by further excavations after the Kosovo War. Currently, a team of Kosovan and French archaeologists is excavating Sector IV of the archaeological park.

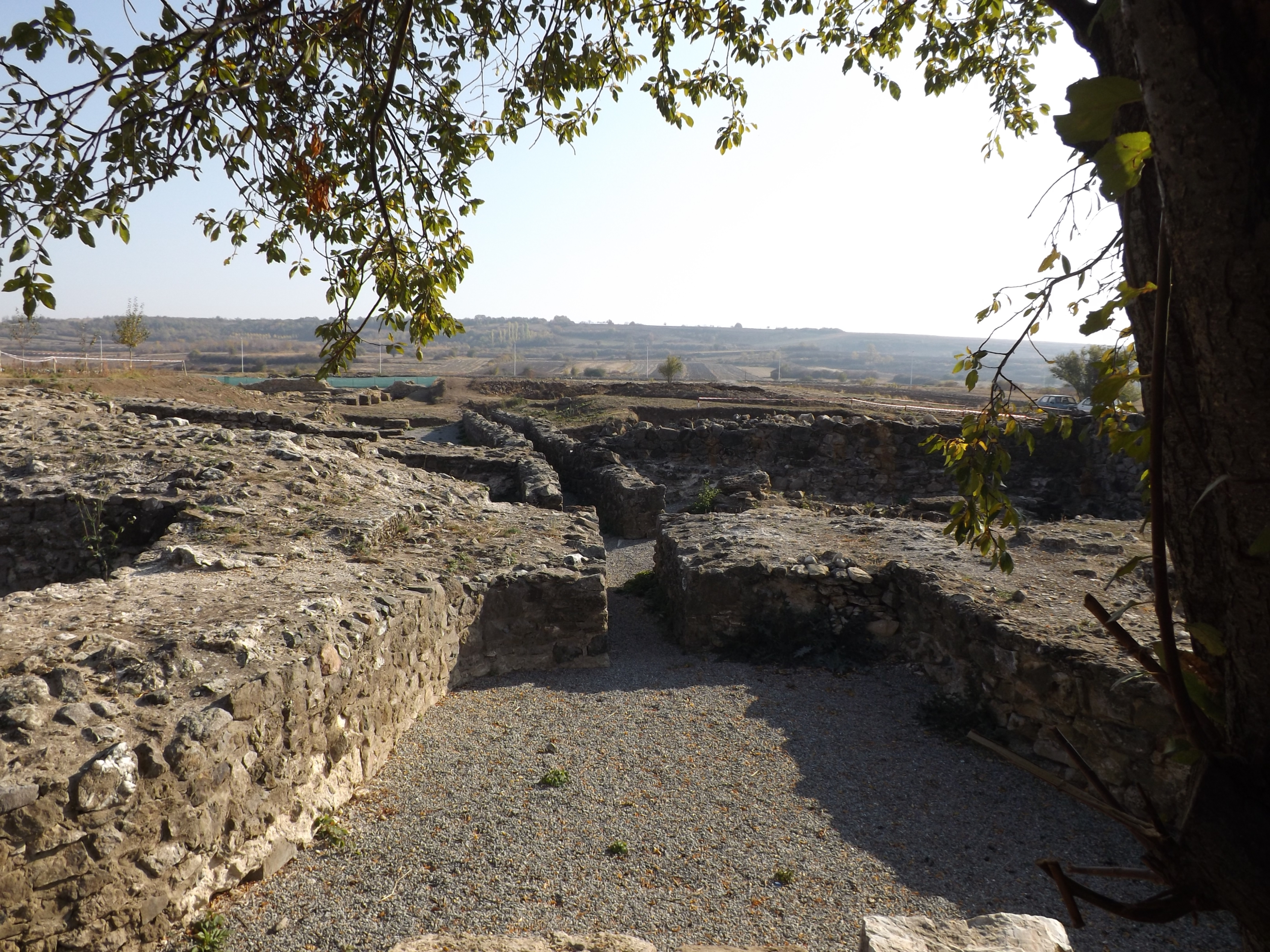
A view of the two towers of the Northern Gate, with a narrow entrance in the middle.

Research attention has so far mainly been given to the findings of the objects in the north entrance of the city. With the addition of the use of air photography and satellites in the past years, archaeologists, with no costly digging and no invasive procedures, were able to find and describe many big antique buildings which included a public bathroom, the forum (administrative center of the city), a residency of the bishop in the era of the early Christianity, and a baptismal chapel.

=== Important findings ===
The most important findings of the city are a church on the northern cemetery (the Northern Necropolis), a basilica near the northern gate (the Early Christian Basilica), the first main church of the city (the Episcopal Basilica with Baptistry), and a recently discovered 6th-century basilica that was commissioned by Justinian himself (the Archiepiscopal Basilica). Other important buildings include the northern gate of the town, a thermae (public bath), and a castrum (a military camp). Apart from buildings, many other smaller objects such as sculptures, coins, weapons, pottery, and other personal belongings have been discovered.

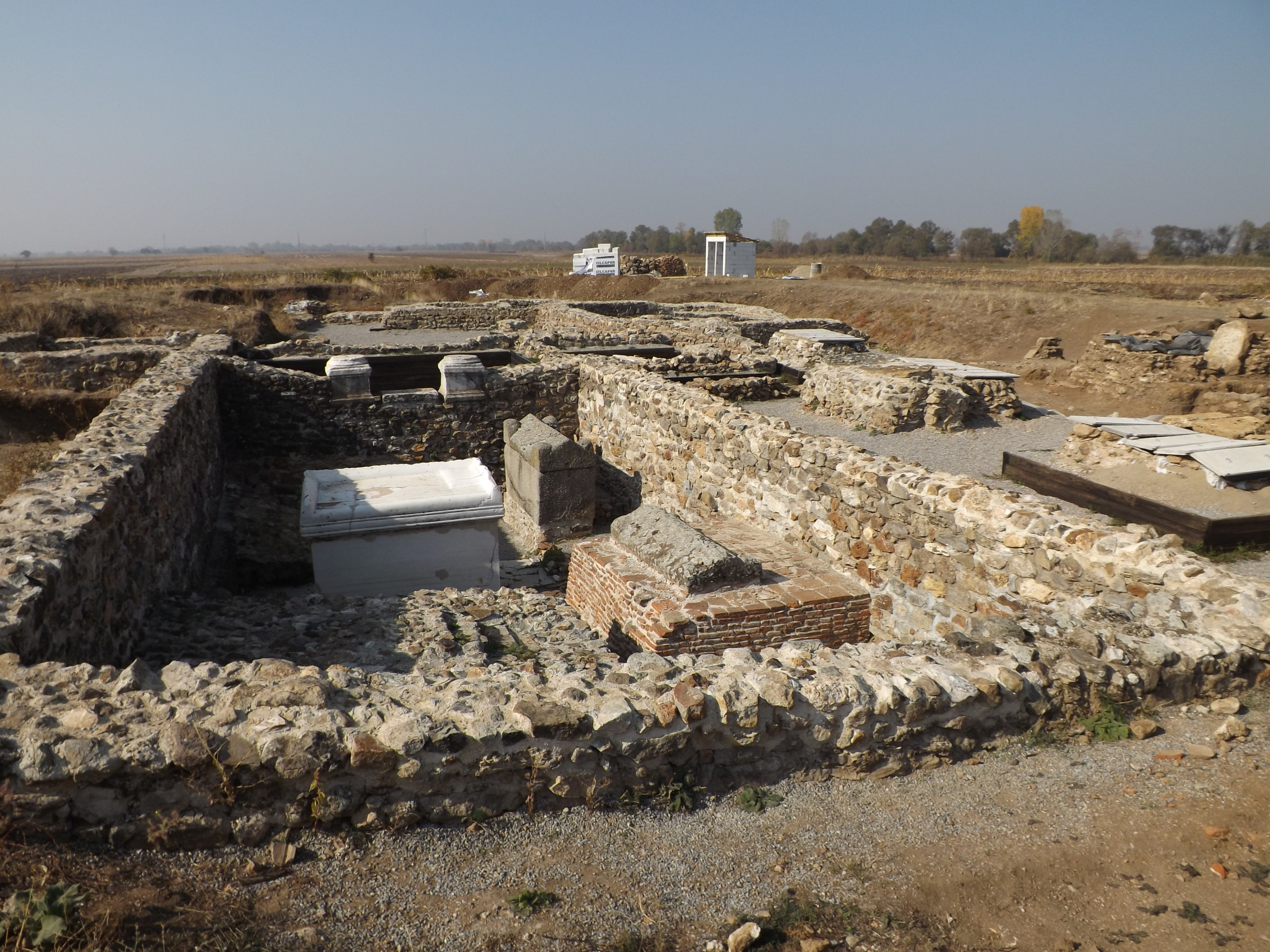
A view of the Northern Necropolis

==== Northern Necropolis (Memoria) ====
The Northern Necropolis (Memoria) is an edifice, located outside the city walls, on top of a cemetery. It was unearthed during the first phase of the excavations in the 1950s. The initial findings were four graves, followed by the discovery of multiple sarcophagi made of marble. Two tombstones were also found, with one of them dedicated to some Aelia Clementilla. The second tombstone, much larger in size, was dedicated to local magistrate Marcus Pontius and his wife Furia Caecilla. Further digging in the same expedition discovered the Necropolis itself. The Necropolis is dated to the 6th century, however, there is evidence to suggest that it predates the city walls, meaning that it was likely constructed in the 4th century. The Necropolis had an apse on its eastern side and a two-columned door between its narthex and its nave. The Necropolis also had a mosaic floor with Latin inscriptions but those were not preserved and have been permanently lost.

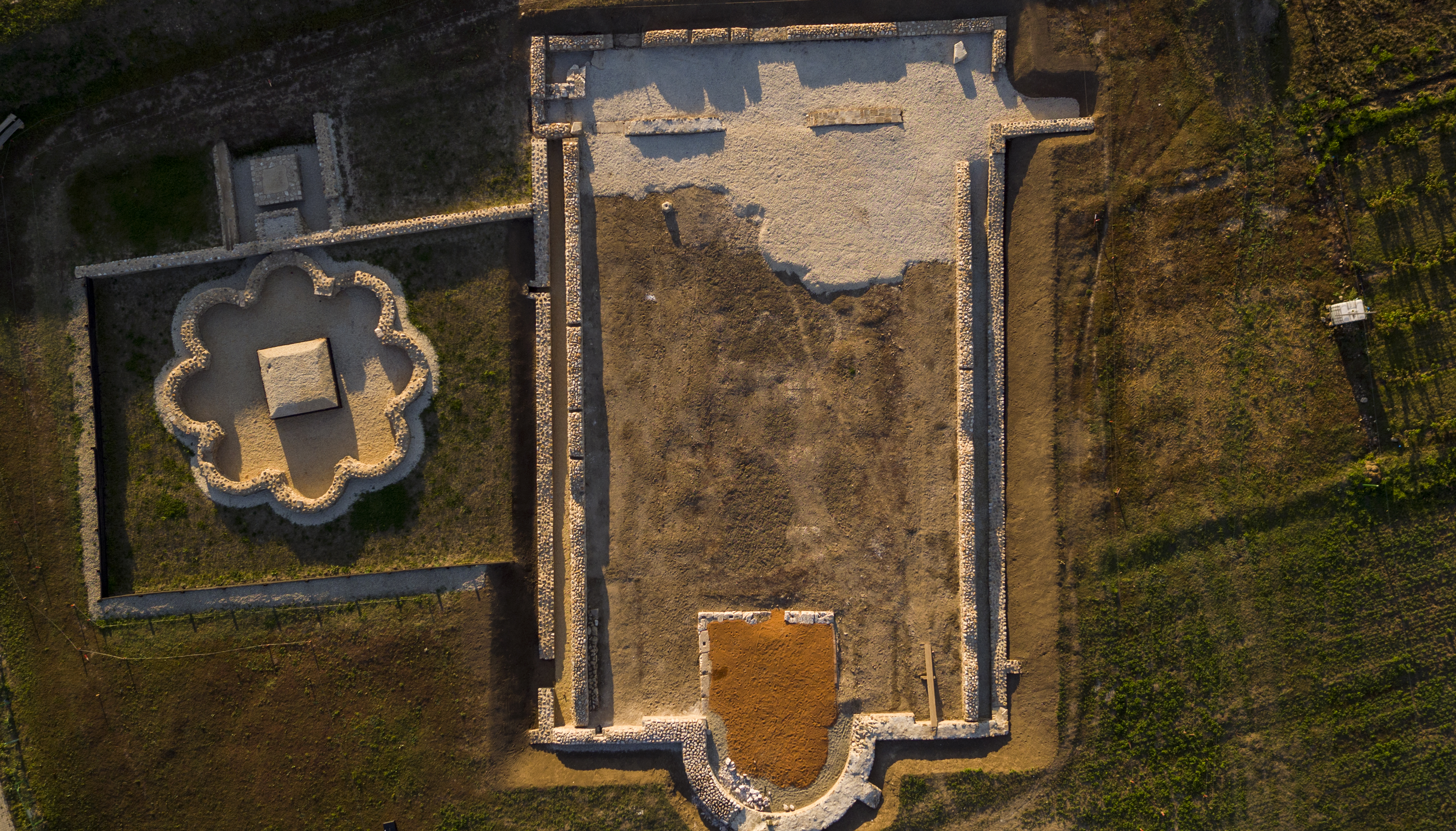
The layout of the Episcopal Basilica (right) and baptismal chapel (left)

==== Episcopal Basilica with Baptistry ====
In 2012, archaeologists discovered the remains of a basilica that was constructed before the 5th century AD. It is 40 m (130 ft) long and 20 m (65 ft) wide and consisted of two aisles and a nave, divided by columns. The nave ended with a single apse in the east. The apse had a synthronon and the floor is decorated by mosaics with geometrical patterns. The basilica had three doors on its western side which led into the narthex, with another three doors leading to the nave. There were another two entrances on the southern side. A baptistry, shaped as an octopetalous rosette, is located 7.5m to the south of the basilica. The original basilica seems to have been destroyed by an earthquake in 358 AD, and then it was rebuilt a few decades later, only to be destroyed again in the 6th century, with holes as deep as 1 meter being present in the nave.

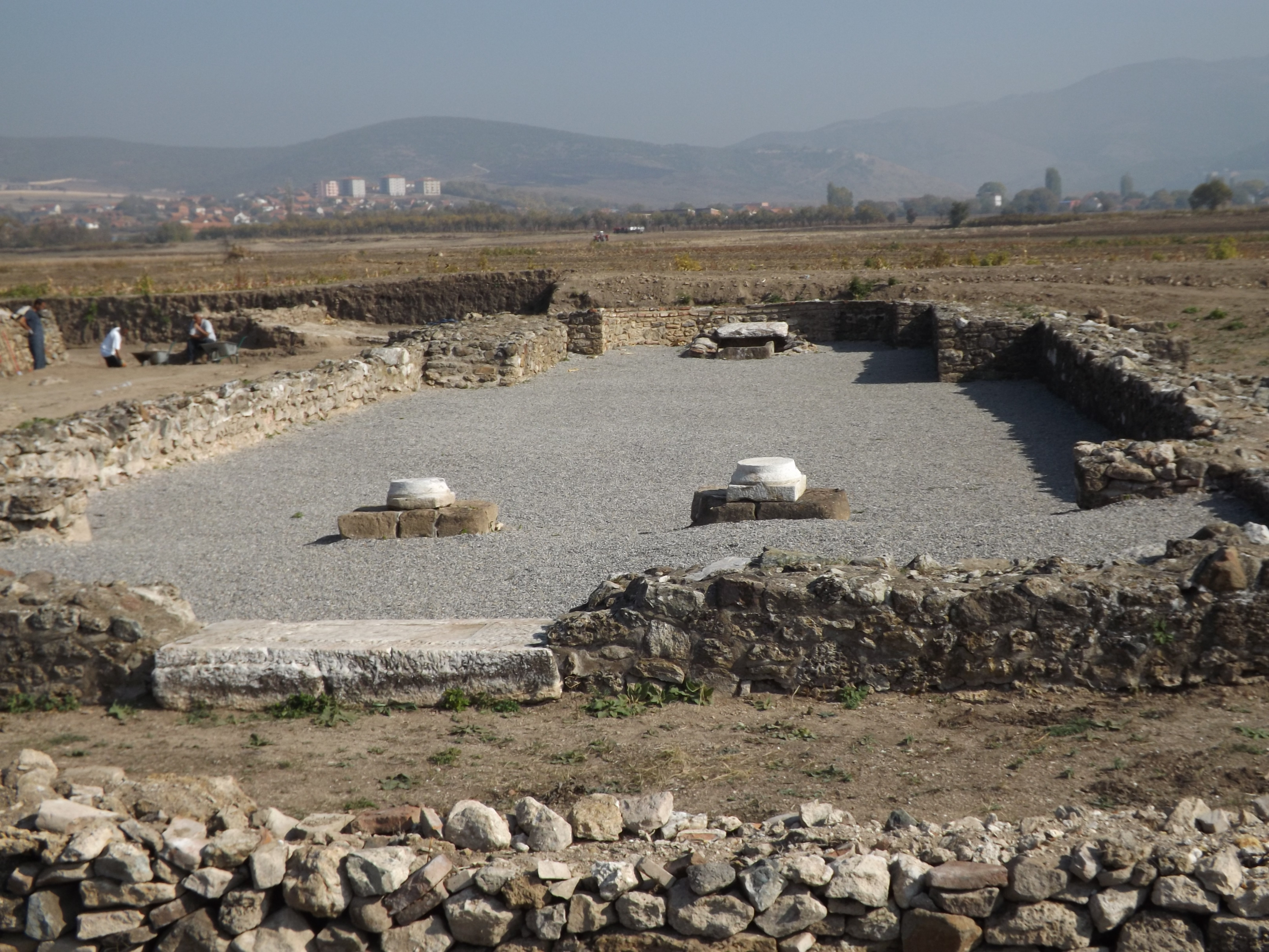
A view of the Early Christian Basilica from the front

==== Early Christian Basilica ====
The Early Christian Basilica is a single-aisled basilica that was discovered in the 1950s. It is 33.5m long and 14m wide. The basilica seems to have been built in five different phases and it is also known as "the church of martyrs" due to its presumed dedication to the martyrs Florus and Laurus. The basilica was built in the 6th century AD and it has a floor mosaic, which has not yet been revealed. Its southern wall has three columns, which suggest that the Basilica had a parecclesion at some point. The Early Christian Basilica may have been built to replace the Episcopal Basilica with Baptistry, which was damaged beyond repair by the 518 AD earthquake.

==== Archiepiscopal Basilica ====
In August 2022, a basilica was discovered in the 4th sector of the archaeological park, located within the 19-hectares fortified section that is located to the north-east of the rest of the city. The basilica, being 70 m (230 ft) long and 20 m (66 ft) wide is the largest in Ulpiana and one of the largest in the region, and is believed to have belonged to the Archbishop of Ulpiana. The floor of the basilica has many mosaics which are currently being unearthed. In 2023, a mosaic related to Emperor Justinian the Great was discovered in the basilica. The mosaic shows that the basilica's construction was commissioned by Justinian himself and possibly dedicated to his wife Theodora. The currently-unveiled text also makes mention of a city in Dardania, which is most likely Ulpiana itself. Archaeologists believe that this suggests that Dardania had some sort of autonomous identity and was not fully Romanized by the 6th century. As of August 2023, the mosaic has not been unveiled completely, with the rest of it expected to be revealed by October 2023. The dedication is written in the Latin language, despite being made by a Byzantine emperor.

==== Castrum ====
The castrum is a field military garrison of the Roman army located 100m to the east of the eastern-wall of Ulpiana and had a size of 16 hectares. Not much is known about it, since it has been located via ground scanning and has not been excavated yet.

==== Objects ====
Several objects have been found in the ruins of the city, with the most important ones being the sculptures of a woman's head; a man's head; the head of Eros, a tragic mask, a terracotta figure, pottery, and coins.

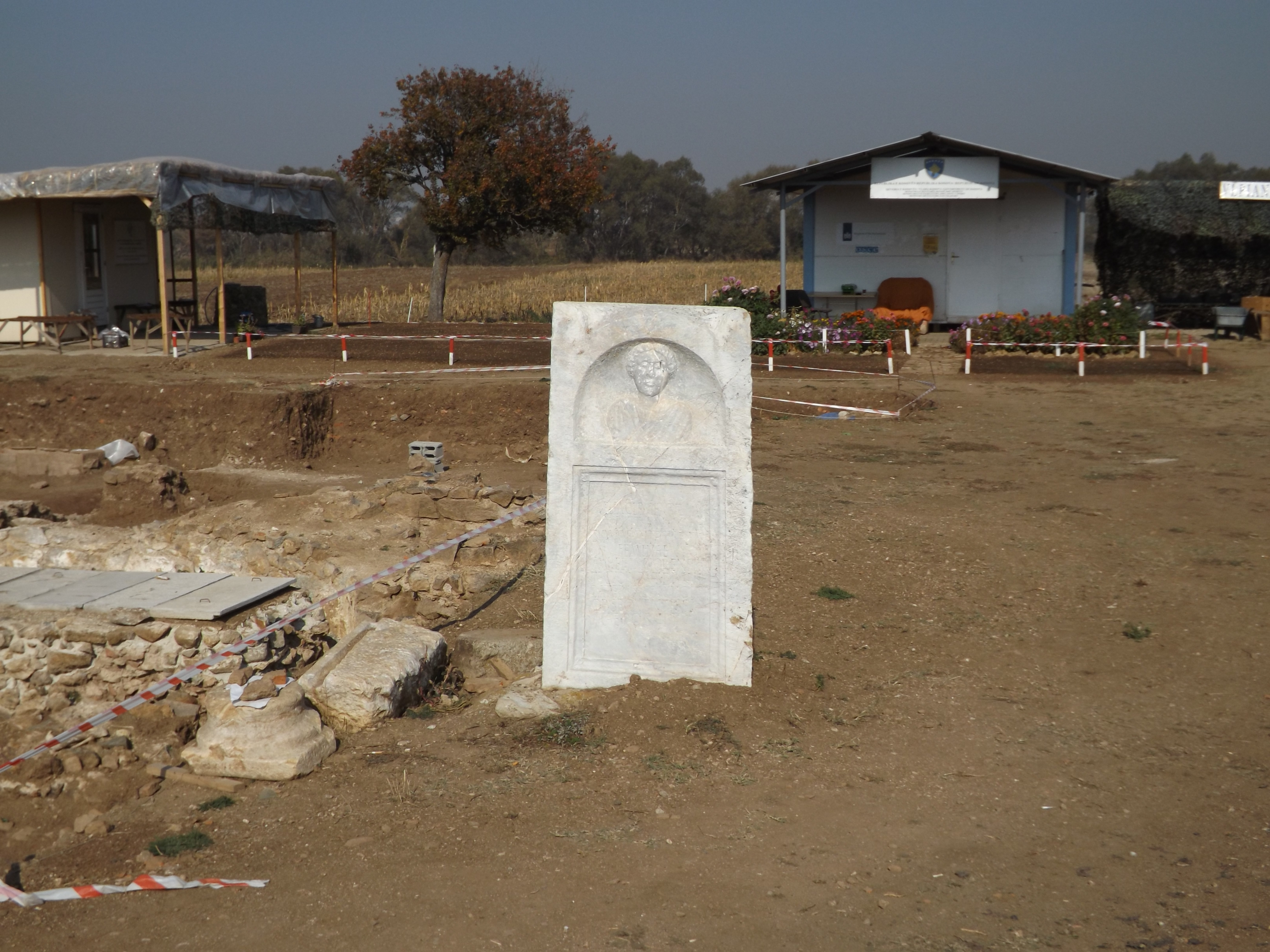
The tombstone of Aelia Clementilla, found at the Northern Necropolis.

The woman's head is an 18 cm-high sculpture that represents a middle-aged woman and is made of fine-grained marble. It is assumed to be from the end of the fourth century. A 33 cm-high man's head, believed to have been part of a life-sized statue in the past is another major finding. It portrays a middle-aged man and is made in a manner that resembles 3rd-century Roman portrait art. Another marble head, the head of Eros portrays a childish face with long hair, but it is not clear what its purpose or meaning was. Finally, a tragic mask is a 27.5 cm-high theatrical mask made of marble and was found at the site of the Northern Necropolis. It depicts the face of a man with grotesque features and possibly dates to the 2nd century AD.

Many objects pre-dating Roman rule have also been found in and around Ulpiana. In 1982, a prehistoric cemetery from the 13th-9th centuries BC was discovered at the center of the city, containing ceramics and other Bronze Age objects. A Neolithic terracotta figurine was discovered in 2016 near the two towers of the northern gate of the city.

== Gallery ==
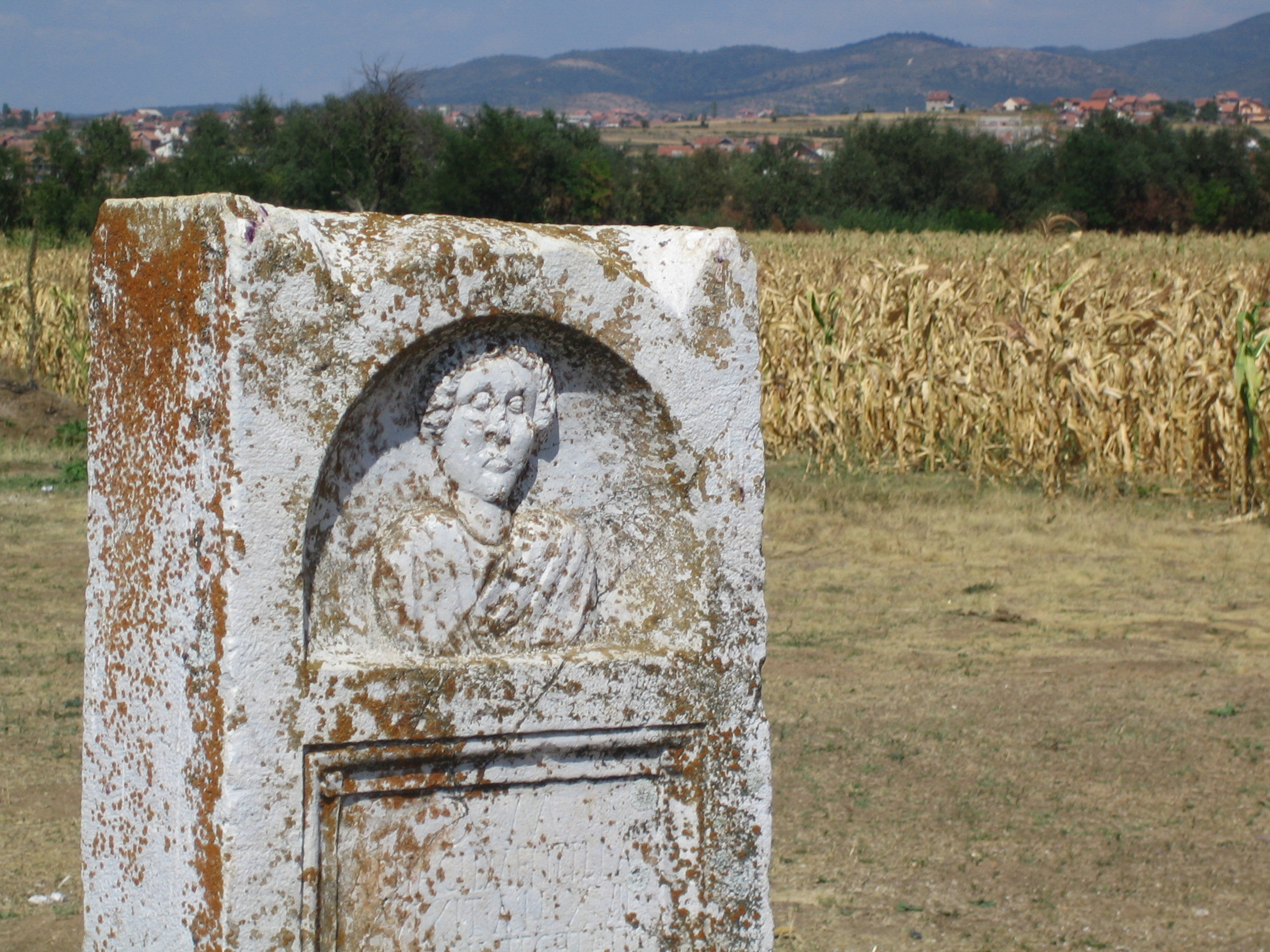
A tombstone in Ulpiana.

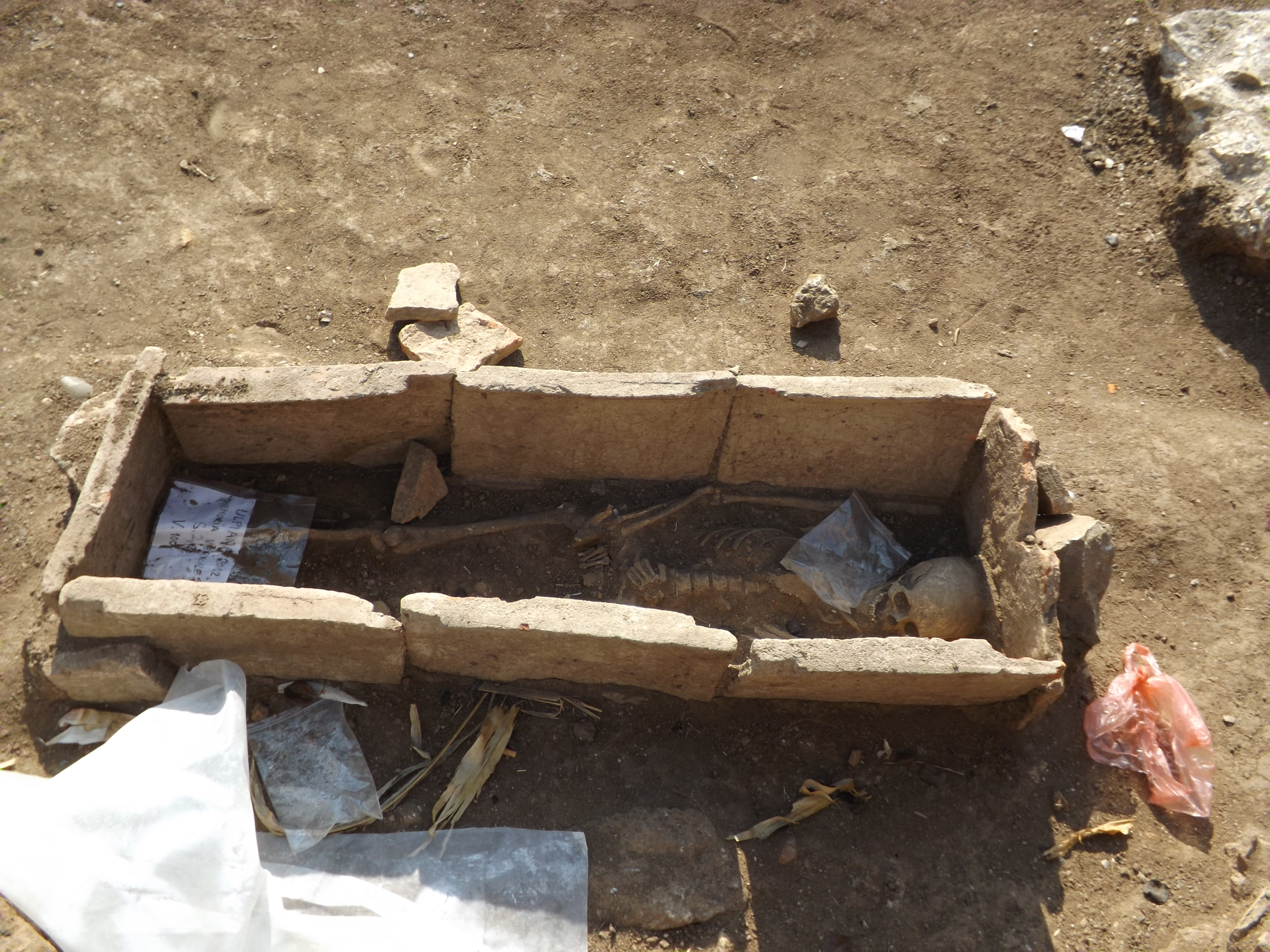
An excavated grave at the Northern Necropolis of Ulpiana.

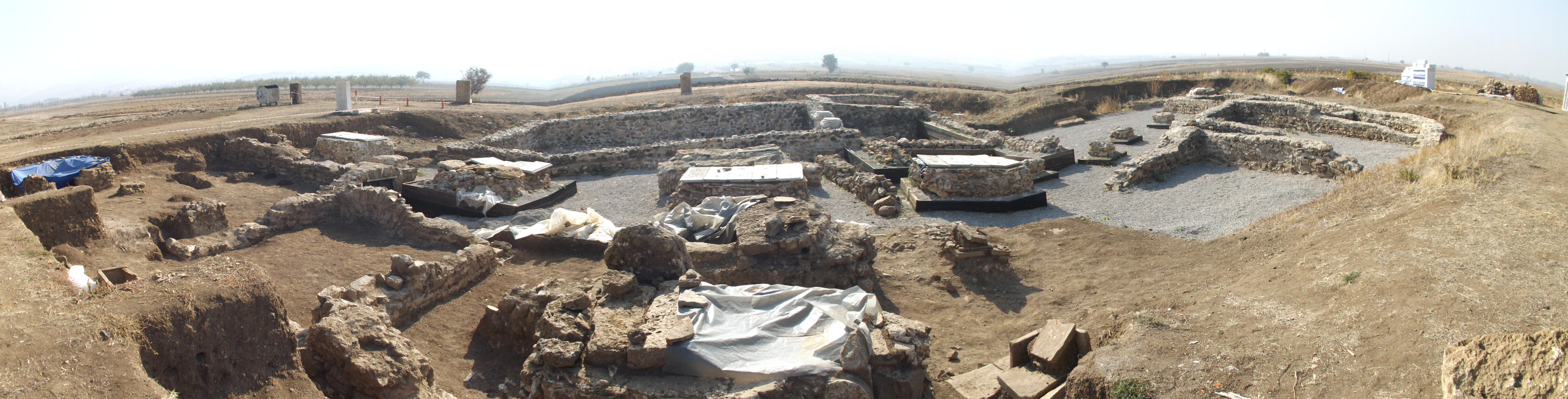
A panorama of the Northern Necropolis of Ulpiana.

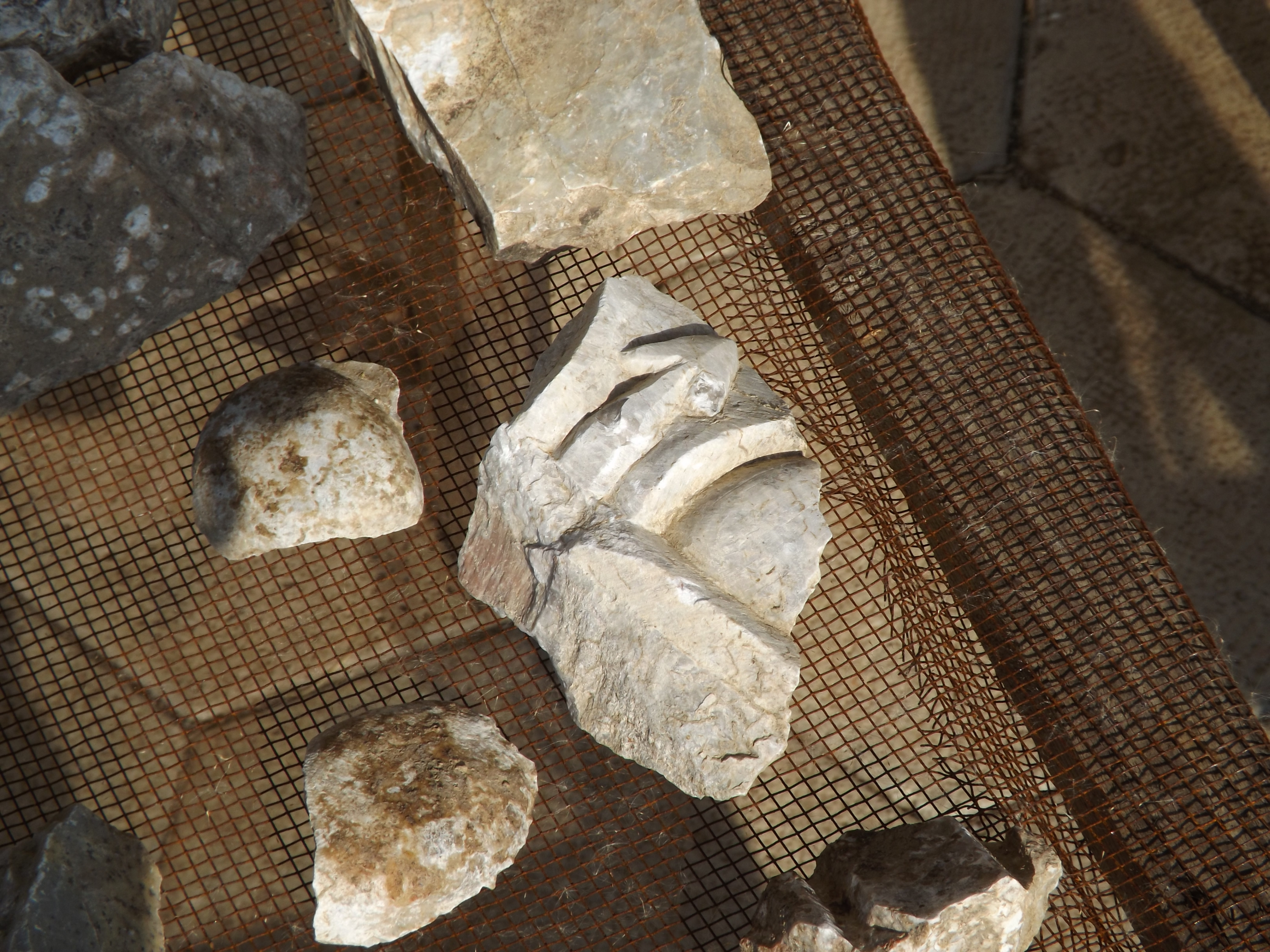
A remnant of an Egg-and-dart ornament, excavated at Ulpiana.

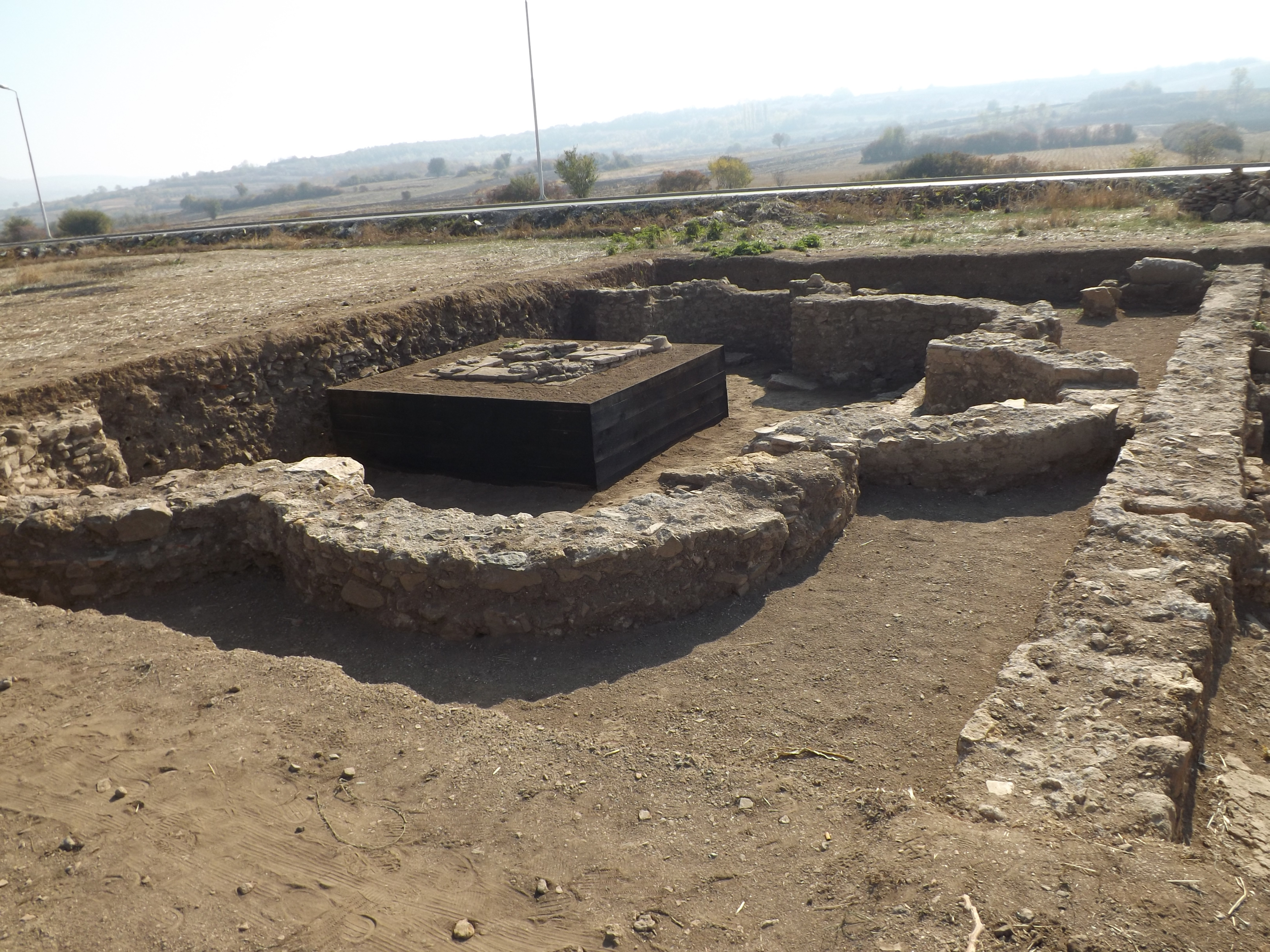
The Baptisterium, not far from the Basilica, but even closer to another church not yet excavated.

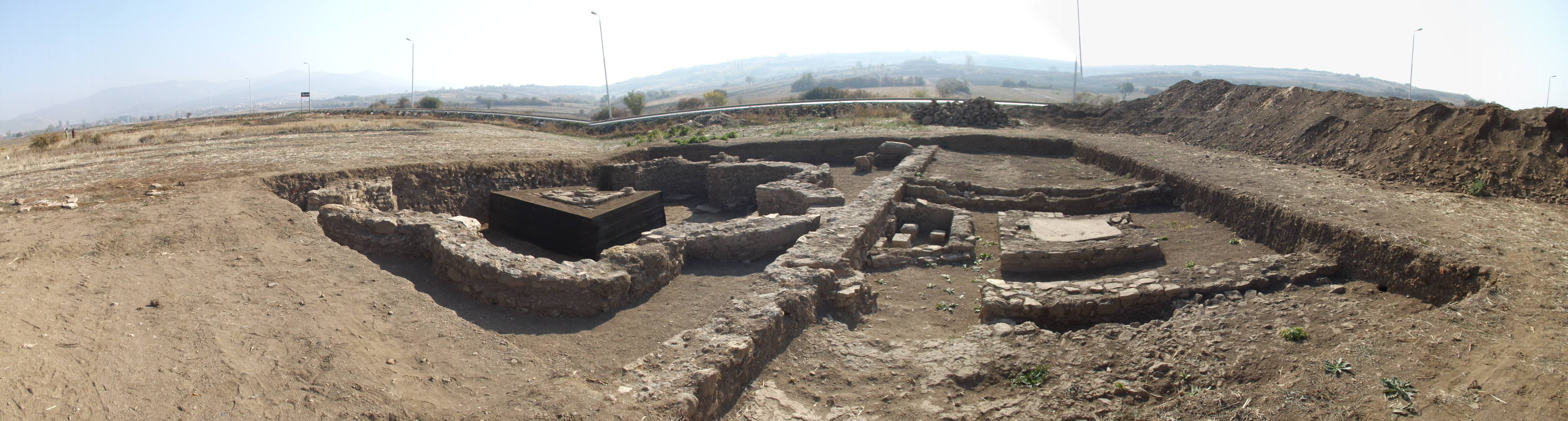
A panorama of the Baptisterium. Note: to the right of it is where the water came in from.

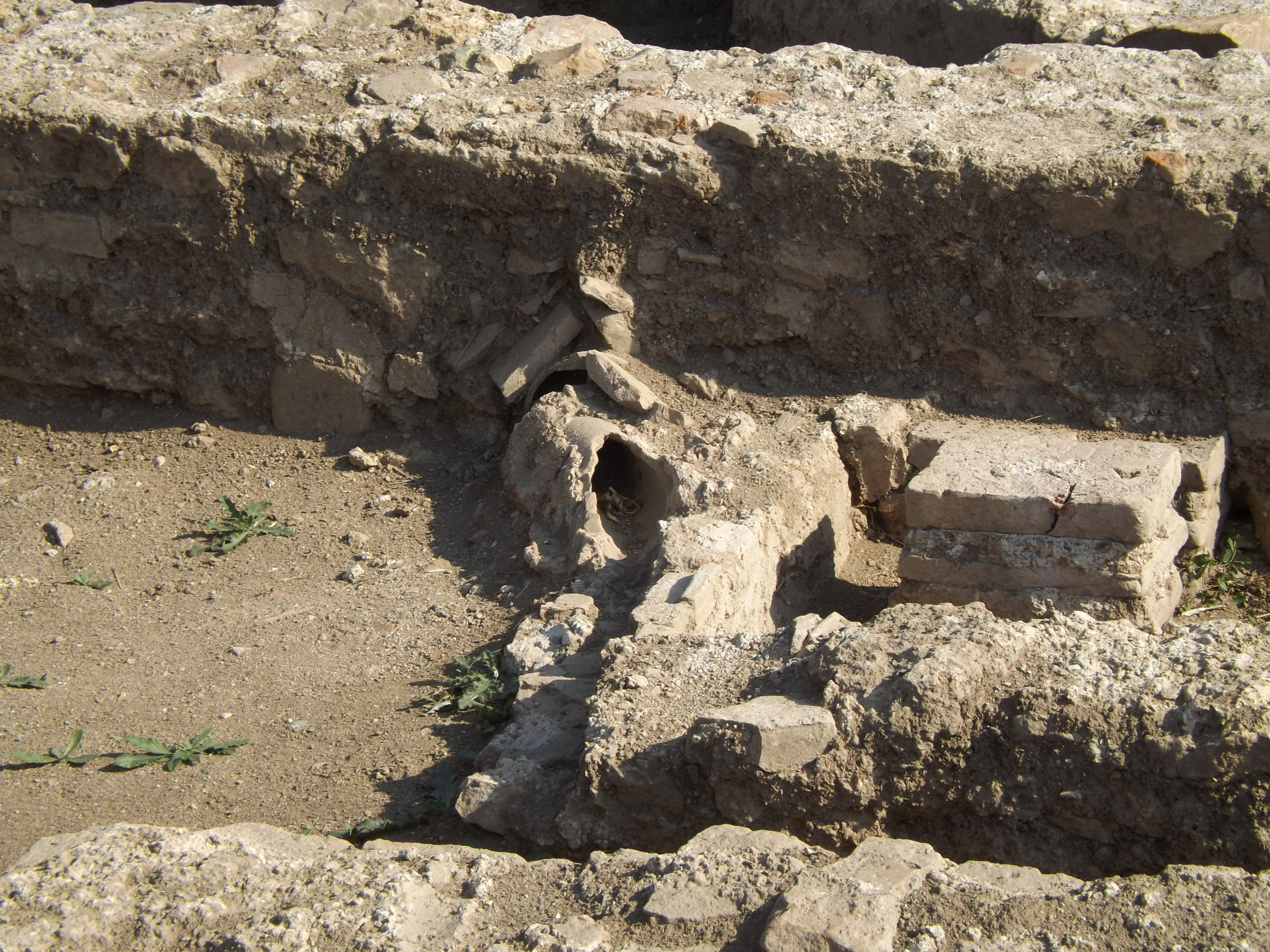
A view of the left pipe that brought water to Baptisterium.

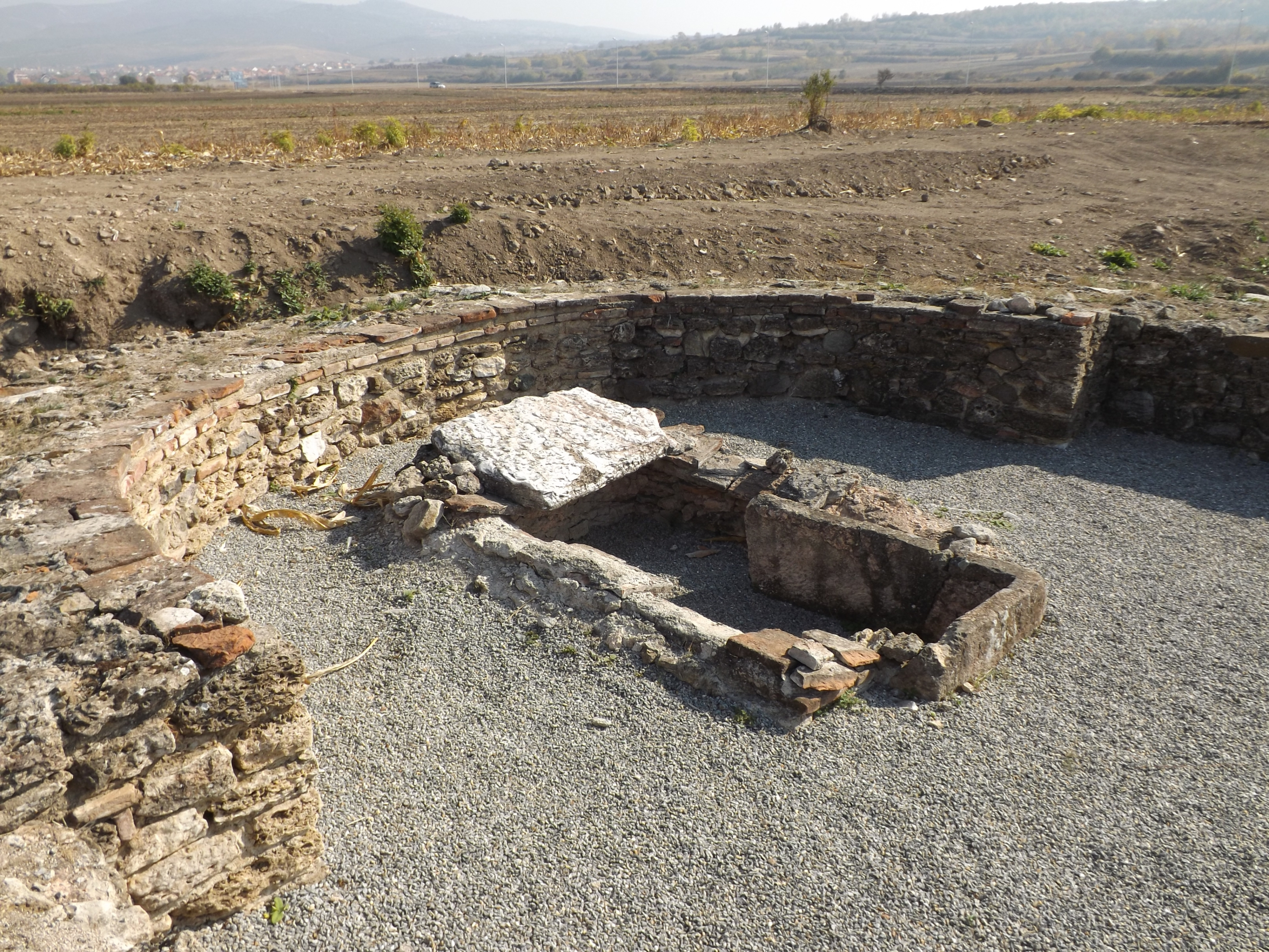
The Basilica apse.

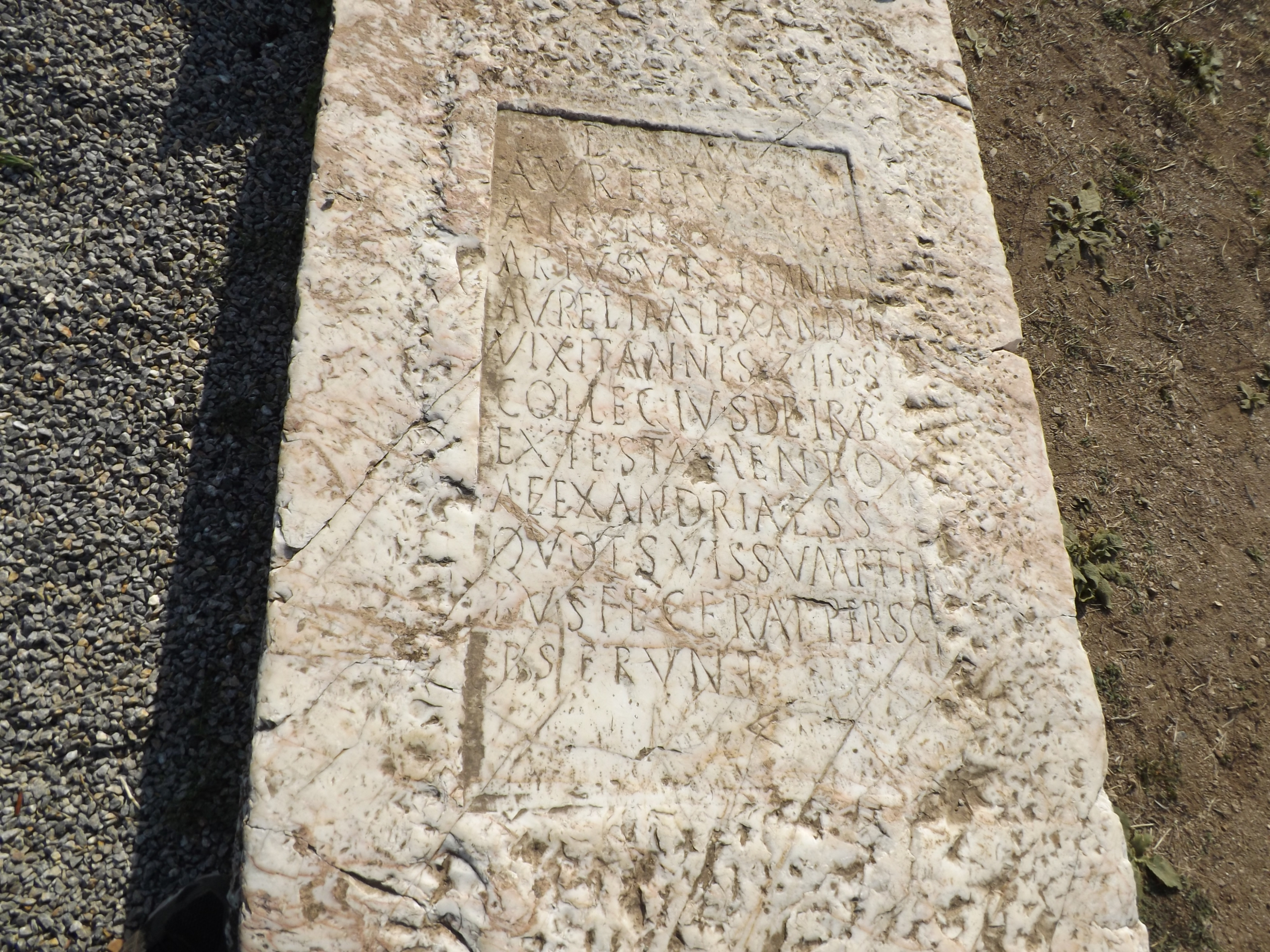
A stelae at the entrance of the Basilica.

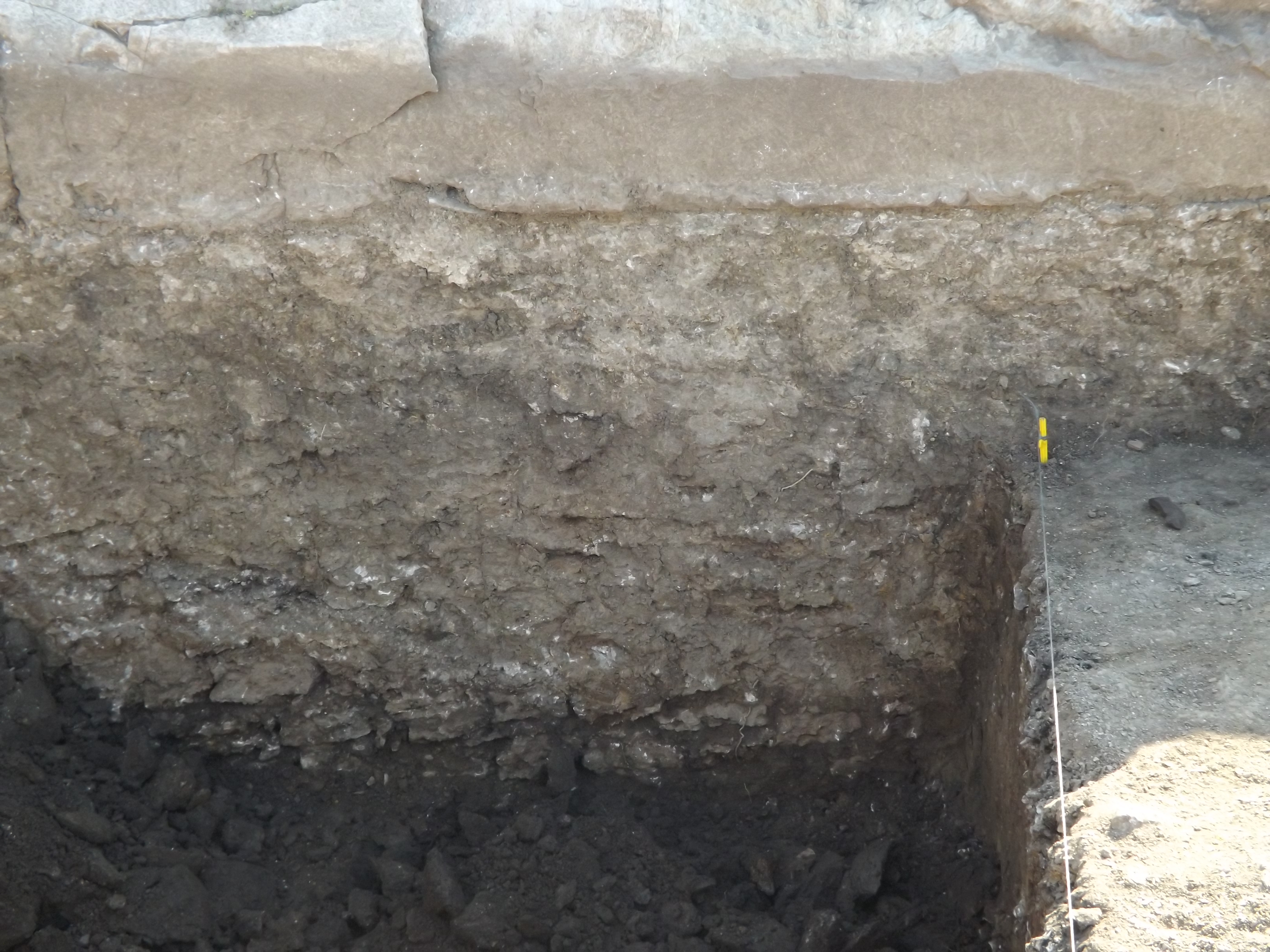
A trench in Ulpiana, which shows the continuity of life in this city from prehistoric times until after Justinian the Great. Note the many layers built on top of each other culminating with the top layer of marble from the time of Justinian.

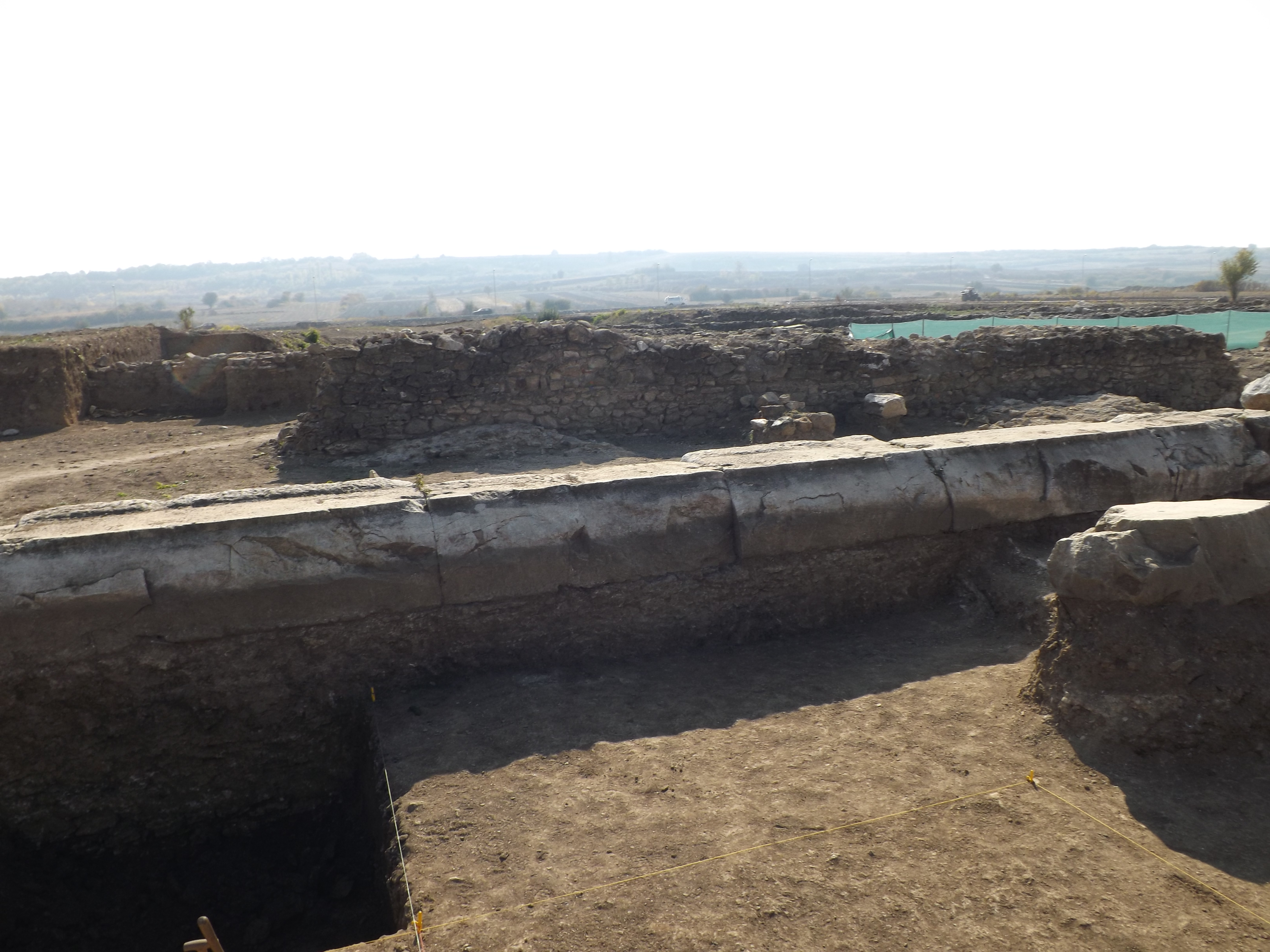
A continuation of the marble wall, with the "time trench" to the left.

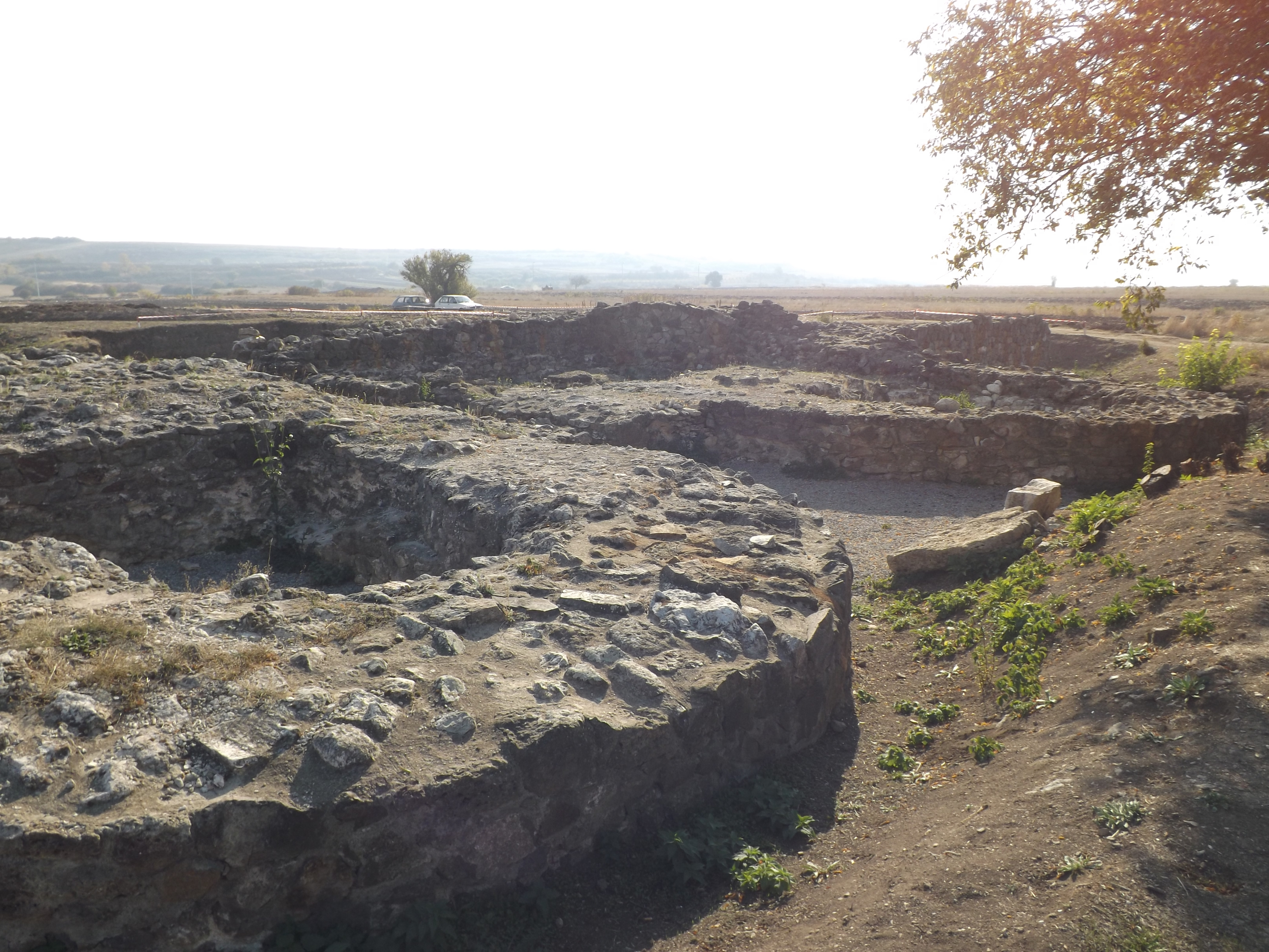
The two towers of the Northern Gate.

== See also ==
- Archaeology of Kosovo
- List of settlements in Illyria

== Bibliography ==
- Berisha, Milot; Haldari, Arben; Goddard, Christophe; Mukai, Tomoo (2017). "Ulpiana (Dardanie). La datation de la fortification de l'église septentrionale". Chronique des activités archéologiques de l'École française de Rome. doi:10.4000/cefr.2746.
- Teichner, Felix (2015). "Ulpiana - Iustiniana secunda (Kosovo) : das urbane Zentrum des dardanischen Bergbaubezirks". Ephemeris Napocensis. 25.
- Hajdari, Arben; Buqinca, Arianit (2018). "A New Unpublished Inscription Dedicated to Jupiter, Discovered in Ulpiana (Kosovo)". Human and Social Studies. 7 (3): 80–87. doi:10.2478/hssr-2018-0026. S2CID 133703795.
- Çetinkaya, Haluk (2016). "Early christian architecture in Ulpiana". Actas del XIII Congreso AIEMA Madrid, 14-18 de Septiembre de 2015.
