= Rodulf, Herule king =

6th-century king in the Balkans

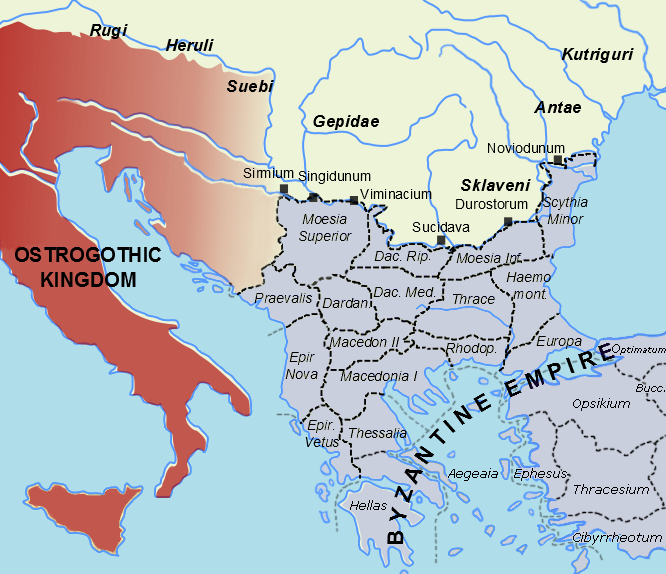
Polities in southeastern Europe c.500 AD before the Lombard destruction of the Herulian kingdom

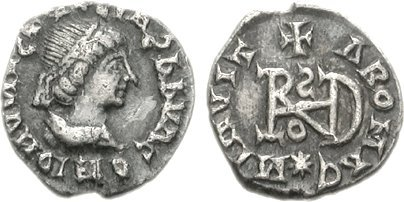
Coin of Theodoric the Great.

Rodulf was king of the Heruli kingdom on the Middle Danube in the period around 491. Because of a war he began and lost against the Lombards somewhere in the period 493-511, the Heruli kingdom he had been ruling near Lower Austria ended, and he was killed. The Heruli had to leave the region, and their population divided, with many eventually moving into the Roman Empire near Singidunum (Belgrade). The near contemporary historian Procopius specified that this defeat happened in about 494, but many modern scholars propose that it must have happened later.

In two surviving letters Theoderic the Great, king in Italy from 493, wrote twice to a Herule king or kings, and although neither document mentions a name, it has been suggested by scholars that one or both of these were sent to Rodulf, the last king of the independent kingdom on the Danube. In one of them, Theoderic "adopted" the king of the Heruli with a gift of arms. In the other, Theoderic wrote to the kings of Heruli, Thuringi, and Warini, about the threat to peace coming from the possibility of conflict between the Franks ruled by Clovis I, and the Visigoths ruled by Alaric II in Gaul. (Clovis eventually defeated and killed Alaric in 507 at the Battle of Vouille.)

Some scholars also equate Rudolf with a Scandinavian king of the same name mentioned by the 6th-century writer Jordanes. According to Jordanes this "Roduulf" left his kingdom in Scandinavia, travelled to Theoderic, and found what he wanted there. The passage is interpreted in different ways by scholars, so there is no consensus about when this happened, or which kingdom Roduulf originally ruled in Scandinavia. Whether or not he was the Heruli king, scholars such as Karl Müllenhoff, Elias Wessén and Ludwig Schmidt speculated that this Scandinavian king Roduulf who came to the Roman court of Theoderic may also have played a role in establishing the idea that the Goths themselves had ancestral connections to Scandinavia, as represented in the work of the 6th century writer Jordanes.

== Attestation in Procopius and Paul ==
The Herulian kingdom discussed by Procopius in the 6th century, and Paul the Deacon in the 8th century had existed in the 5th century somewhere in the area near northern Lower Austria, north of the Danube. Rodulf is the only known king of this kingdom, and the first mention of him which can be associated with a date is the remark of Procopius that implies he was already ruling before 491 when Anastasius I (reigned 491-518) became Eastern Roman emperor. He was still ruling when Theoderic the Great took over the Kingdom of Italy from Odoacer in 493. According to Procopius:

...they made the Lombards, who were Christians, together with several other nations, subject and tributary to themselves, though the barbarians of that region were not accustomed to that sort of thing; but the Eruli were led to take this course by love of money and a lawless spirit. When, however, Anastasius took over the Roman empire, the Eruli, having no longer anyone in the world whom they could assail, laid down their arms and remained quiet, and they observed peace in this way for a space of three years. But the people themselves, being exceedingly vexed, began to abuse their leader Rodolphus without restraint, and going to him constantly they called him cowardly and effeminate, and railed at him in a most unruly manner, taunting him with certain other names besides. And Rodolphus, being quite unable to bear the insult, marched against the Lombards, who were doing no wrong, without charging against them any fault or alleging any violation of their agreement, but bringing upon them a war which had no real cause.

According to Procopius, Rodulf lost, and he was killed during the battle.

Paul the Deacon also mentioned Rodulf and his defeat by the Lombards in his much later-written Historia Langobardorum ("History of the Lombards"). However, he gave Rodulf a more legitimate casus belli against the Lombards. Rodulf purportedly declared war against the Lombards because his brother was murdered by Rumetruda, the daughter of the Lombard king Tato. A similar but shorter account exists in the Origo gentis Langobardorum.

The Lombards took both Rodulf's standard (vexillum) and his helmet, and Paul the Deacon claimed that this broke the courage of the Heruli such that they never had a king again. However Procopius, who was much closer to the events, notes that after the Heruli divided and moved, there were several later kings.

Despite the dating given by Procopius, most historians think the defeat of the Heruli by the Lomards happened much later than 494, in the period 507-511. After this defeat, Procopius reported that the Heruli moved around looking for a new home. Eventually some Heruli crossed the Danube into the Roman empire, but another part of the Heruli nobility migrated north to the island of Thule, the name Procopius gave to Scandinavia. Those who moved into the empire were allowed to settle in a new kingdom under Roman controlled territory near present-day Belgrade. Marcellinus Comes dates this move into the empire to 512.

== Other possible attestations as Herul king ==
The correspondence of Theoderic collected in the Variae of Cassiodorus also mentions an unnamed king (or kings) of the Heruli, who has been identified with Rodulf by some historians.

In one letter Theodoric adopted a king of the Heruli as his "son in arms," by giving him a horse, sword and shield, probably around 507. The letter to the king, which was to be translated and explained by the envoys, stated that the king would "hold the first rank among the peoples".

In another letter from the collection of Cassiodorus, Theodoric asked for the assistance of the kings of the Heruli, Thuringi and Varni against the pressure from the Franks, who were in conflict with the Visigoths led by Alaric II who was eventually killed by the Franks in 507 at the Battle of Vouillé. The letter asks these rulers to "remember how often Alaric's father Euric gave you presents and staved off war from your borders". Euric reigned 466-484.

According to historian Herwig Wolfram, after becoming ruler of Italy in 493, Theodoric wanted to repacify the previous homeland of the Goths near Sirmium, and he therefore wanted to establish an alliance with the Heruli king Rodulf. As a result, according to Wolfram, Rodulf "probably included in his sphere of influence the region north of Lake Balaton."

== Possible connection to Scandinavia ==
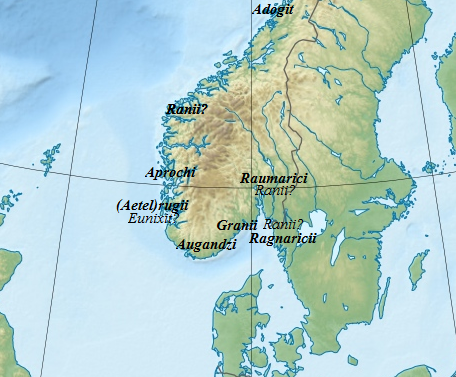
A modern interpretation of locations of the tribes described by Jordanes in Scandza, some possibly ruled by Rodulf.

It is uncertain but possible that this Rodulf is the same king of that name who is described in the Getica of Jordanes, as a king on the "island" of Scandza (what Jordanes called Scandinavia), who left his kingdom voluntarily, and came to Italy, where he succeeded in gaining the "embrace" (gremium) of the Ostrogothic King of Italy, Theodoric the Great. In the Getica, it is said that Rodulf spurned and left his own kingdom, in times which were still recent for Jordanes. Jordanes describes him as achieving what he desired from Theoderic. The passage, as translated by Christensen, is as follows:

The Dani [...] drove from their homes the Heruli, who lay claim to preeminence among all the nations of Scandza for their tallness. Furthermore there are in the same neighbourhood the Grannii, Augandzi, Eunixi, Taetel, Rugi, Aprochi and Rani, over whom Roduulf was king not many years ago. But he despised his own kingdom and fled to the embrace of Theoderic, king of the Goths, finding there what he desired.

Because Jordanes mentioned that Rodulf had a connection to Theoderic, and the Heruli also had a king named Rodulf and at least one unnamed king who was an ally of Theoderic (as indicated by the correspondence), scholars have also speculated that this Rodulf from Scandinavia became the king of the Danubian Heruli, and also that he is the un-named Heruli king who is mentioned in the surviving state papers of Theoderic. Other scholars believe this proposal to equate the Scandinavian and Herulian Rodulfs is unjustified. Taken literally, the passage makes no connection between this Ruduulf and the Heruli at all. On the one hand, it clearly mentions both the Heruli and king Roduulf as having lived in Scandinavia, and left it. On the other hand, the Heruli were forced out by the Danes, while Roduulf left voluntarily, and there is no indication that these events happened at a similar time. The text as it has survived either means that the Scandinavian Roduulf was king of the Rani, or else of the whole group including the Grannii, Augandzi, Eunixi, Taetel, Rugi, Arochi, and Ranii. The fact that Jordanes specifies that Roduulf came to Theoderic "not many years ago" has been seen as an indication that this part of the text comes from Cassiodorus, who Jordanes named as a source, and it has also been seen as evidence that this occurred after the Herule-Lombard war.

Proponents of equating the two Rodulfs have proposed that there are errors in the text, but there is no consensus about what Jordanes intended. In the 19th century Monumenta Germaniae Historica edition of Jordanes by the German classicist Theodor Mommsen, the extended index entry for "Roduulf" by Karl Müllenhoff argued that the Roduulf in Scandinavia and the Rodulf of the Heruli tribe were the same person, and Jordanes had intended to say that the Scandinavian was king of the Heruli. On the other hand, the un-named king of the Heruli whom Theoderic adopted by arms must have been someone different. He proposed that Rodulf could have arrived to Theodoric in 489, when he was in Moesia, and not yet king of Italy. Other scholars who equated the Scandinavian Rodulf with the Heruli king including Josef Svennung and Elias Wessén. The equation was also accepted by Martindale in the Prosopography of the Later Roman Empire (PLRE).

Ludwig Schmidt, in contrast, disagreed that this Scandinavian Rudolf was the Heruli king, and didn't see the list of peoples given by Jordanes as reliable. He described this King Roduulf as a Gaut. Herwig Wolfram accepted the conclusions of Schmidt and called the equation of Roduulf with the Heruli king, as found in PLRE, outdated.

The name of the Rugii, on the other hand, matches another Middle Danubian people, who were neighbours of the Heruli, and they are thought to have migrated from the Baltic Sea. Historian Axel Kristinsson has speculated that it could have been natural for Rodulf to seek out some of his kinsmen, namely the Danubian Rugians who had joined the Ostrogoths after their kingdom was destroyed in 487.

Andrew Merrills accepts that Rodulf the Heruli king may have earlier joined Theoderic as an exile in Moesia, before Theoderic became king of Italy. He argues that this passage in Jordanes was probably based on information from Cassiodorus, who had lived in the court of Theoderic. However, he also proposed that Rodulf’s "somewhat ambiguous origins" might have been "accentuated retrospectively" by Cassiodorus, and the connection to the Scandinavian tribes could have been politically motivated: "The Getica may, of course, be correct in its association of Roduulf with the far north, but the possibility that it merely reflects an ideological distortion should not be overlooked."

The scientist-explorer Fridtjof Nansen proposed that "Heruli" at first perhaps was a common name for bands of northern warriors, who to a certain degree consisted of Norwegians. In his book In northern mists, Nansen suggested that Rodulf of the Ranii tribe could have migrated south with a band of warriors, and that on arriving at the Danube, pressed by other warlike tribes in the vicinity, he sought alliance with Theodoric. Nansen believed this could have happened before Theodoric's invasion of Italy in 489, at the same time that the Heruli were just north of the Danube, and were the nearest neighbours of the Goths.

In short, although many scholars have identified the unnamed Heruli king and the Rodulfs as the same person, including the Reallexikon der Germanischen Altertumskunde in an entry by Norwegian historian Claus Krag, others such as historian Walter Goffart and archaeologist Dagfinn Skre have questioned this identification.

== Scandinavian history ==
Whether or not he can be equated to the Heruli king, many modern historians have speculated that the Scandinavian Roduulf mentioned by Jordanes, or a similar traveler, could have provided Cassiodorus or Jordanes with the information for their information about Scandinavia, stimulating interest in it. In any case, Rodulf was not the only Nordic warlord who visited the Goths and potentially could have provided knowledge about Scandinavian tribes. He probably traveled together with a band of warriors.

Some modern historians, mostly Norwegian, have continued to make such proposals and imply that Rodulf was a king of all seven of these peoples there. For example, the list has been interpreted as referring to the inhabitants of "Grenland, Halogaland, Telelmark, Ryfylkem, Hordaland, and Ranrike or Romsdal". The vast geographic distances between the tribes, scattered throughout the Norwegian coast, and the unlikeliness of a unified kingdom of such a magnitude at this early point has been cited as an argument against such a possibility.

More speculatively, another debated issue is whether Rodulf could be the inspiration for certain aspects of later heroic poetry, possibly including the Norse saga character Hrólfr Kraki.

== Aftermath ==
Paul the Deacon and the Origo gentis Langobardorum both mention that a later Lombard king Wacho, who was the nephew and eventual successor of Tato, took Silinga as his third wife, and she was the daughter of a Herule king. This leads some scholars to believe that Silinga was probably a daughter of Rodulf. They had the son Walthari. The marriage between Wacho and Silinga could have functioned to legitimize the Lombards as the successors to the kingdom of the Heruls.

It has been debated whether Rodulf may have influenced later heroic poetry, since the causes of the war between the Lombards and the Heruli (as reported by Paul the Deacon) concerns related issues. Some have furthermore argued that Rodulf could be the background for the character Hrólfr Kraki who appears in the later sagas. Evidence for this includes the significant similarities between the traditions of, on the one side, the Scyldings of the Skjöldunga saga and the Scylfings of the Swedish sagas, and on the other, historical knowledge of the environment around the Heruli, Goths and Huns.

It has also been speculated that the Ráðulfr mentioned in the Rök runestone (which also mentions Theodoric the Great) could be identical with Rodulf.

== Bibliography ==
=== Primary sources ===
- Cassiodorus, The Letters of Cassiodorus, IV. 2., III. 3.
- Jordanes, The Origin and Deeds of the Goths, 3. 24.
- Paul the Deacon, History of the Lombards, I. XX.
- Procopius, The Wars of Justinian, VI. xiv.

=== Modern sources ===
- Christensen, Arne Søby (2002). Cassiodorus, Jordanes and the History of the Goths. Museum Tusculanum Press. ISBN 9788772897103.
- Ellegård, Alvar (1987). "Who were the Eruli?". Scandia. 53.
- Goffart, Walter (2009). Barbarian Tides: The Migration Age and the Later Roman Empire. University of Pennsylvania. ISBN 978-0-8122-2105-3.
- Helle, Knut (2003). The Cambridge History of Scandinavia. Vol. 1. Cambridge University. p. 82. ISBN 978-0-521-47299-9.
- Koht, Halvdan (1955). Harald Hårfagre og rikssamlinga (in Norwegian). Aschehoug. p. 12.
- Krag, Claus (2003). "Rodulf". In Beck, Heinrich; Geuenich, Dieter; Steuer, Heiko (eds.). Reallexikon der Germanischen Altertumskunde (in German). Vol. 25. Walter de Gruyter. pp. 58–59. ISBN 3-11-017733-1.
- Kristinsson, Axel (2010). Expansions: Competition and Conquest in Europe since the Bronze Age. ReykjavíkurAkademían. ISBN 978-9979-9922-1-9.
- Maenchen-Helfen, Otto (1973). The World of the Huns: Studies in Their History and Culture. University of California. p. 487. ISBN 978-0-520-01596-8.
- Martindale, John R., ed. (1980). The Prosopography of the Later Roman Empire: Volume II, AD 395–527. Cambridge: Cambridge University Press. ISBN 0-521-20159-4.
- Merrills, A. H. (2005). History and Geography in Late Antiquity. Cambridge University Press. ISBN 978-0-521-84601-1.
- Nansen, Fridtjof (1911). In northern mists; Arctic exploration in early times. Vol. 1. Library of Alexandria. pp. 137–139. ISBN 978-1-4655-4901-3.
- Prostko-Prostyński, Jan (2021), A History of the Herules, Uniwersytet im. Adama Mickiewicza w Poznaniu Poznań, ISBN 978-83-232-3902-4
- Sarantis, Alexander (2010). "The Justinianic Herules". In Curta, Florin (ed.). Neglected Barbarians. ISD. ISBN 9782503531250.
- Schmidt, Ludwig (1941), Ostgermanen (2 ed.), C.H. Beck
- Skre, Dagfinn (1998). Herredømmet: bosetning og besittelse på Romerike 200-1350 e. Kr (in Norwegian). University of Oslo: Universitetsforlaget. ISBN 82-00-12854-7.
- Skre, Dagfinn (2020). Skre, Dagfinn (ed.). Rulership in 1st to 14th century Scandinavia. Royal graves and sites at Avaldsnes and beyond. Ergänzungsbände zum Reallexikon der Germanischen Altertumskunde. Vol. 114. doi:10.1515/9783110421101. ISBN 9783110421101. S2CID 238078452.
- Steinacher, Roland [in German] (2010). "The Herules: Fragments of a History". In Curta, Florin (ed.). Neglected Barbarians. ISD. ISBN 9782503531250.
- Steinacher, Roland (2017), Rom und die Barbaren. Völker im Alpen- und Donauraum (300-600), Kohlhammer Verlag, ISBN 9783170251700
- Svennung, Josef (1967), Jordanes und Scandia: kritisch-exegetische Studien, Almqvist & Wiksell
- Weibull, Lauritz Ulrik Absalon (1925), "Skandza und ihre Völker in Darstellung des Jordanes", Arkiv för Nordisk Filologi, 41
- Wolfram, Herwig (1988) [First published in Germany in 1979]. History of the Goths (in German). Translated by Dunlap, Thomas. University of California. p. 318. ISBN 0-520-06983-8.
- Wolfram, Herwig (1995). Salzburg, Bayern, Österreich: Conversio Bagoariorum et Carantanorum und die Quellen ihrer Zeit (in German). Oldenbourg Verlag. ISBN 978-3-7029-0404-3.
- Wolfram, Herwig (2004). "Origo Gentis: The Literature of Germanic Origins". In Murdoch, Brian; Read, Malcolm Kevin (eds.). Early Germanic Literature and Culture. Boydell & Brewer. pp. 39–54. ISBN 1-57113-199-X.
- Wolfram, Herwig (2006). "Waffensohn". In Beck, Heinrich; Geuenich, Dieter; Steuer, Heiko (eds.). Reallexikon der Germanischen Altertumskunde (in German). Vol. 33. Walter de Gruyter. pp. 49–51. ISBN 978-3-11-018388-7.
