= Origo Gentis Langobardorum =

7th-century Latin book

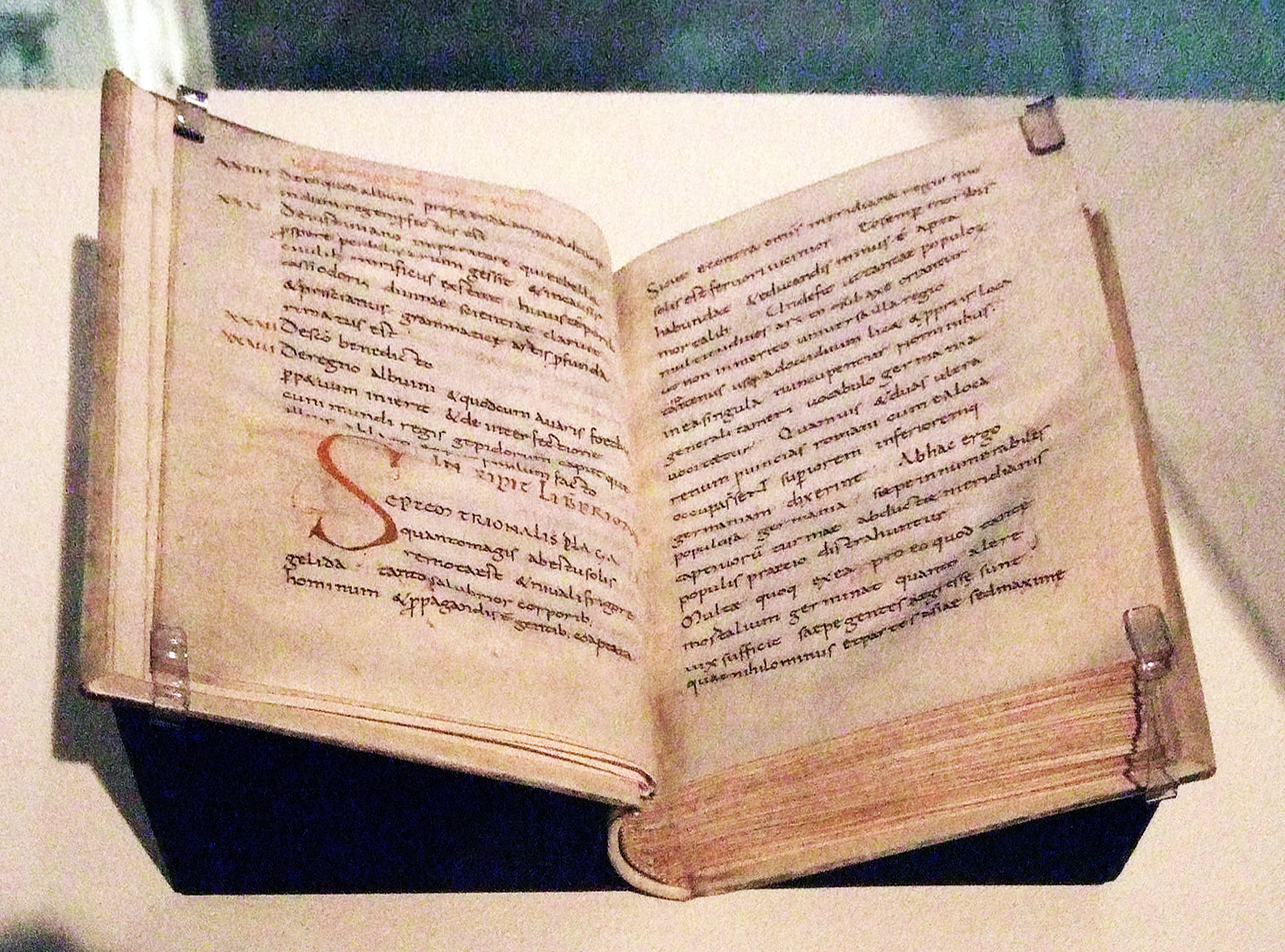
A 10th-century codex of Origo gentis Langobardorum from Reims, now in Berlin

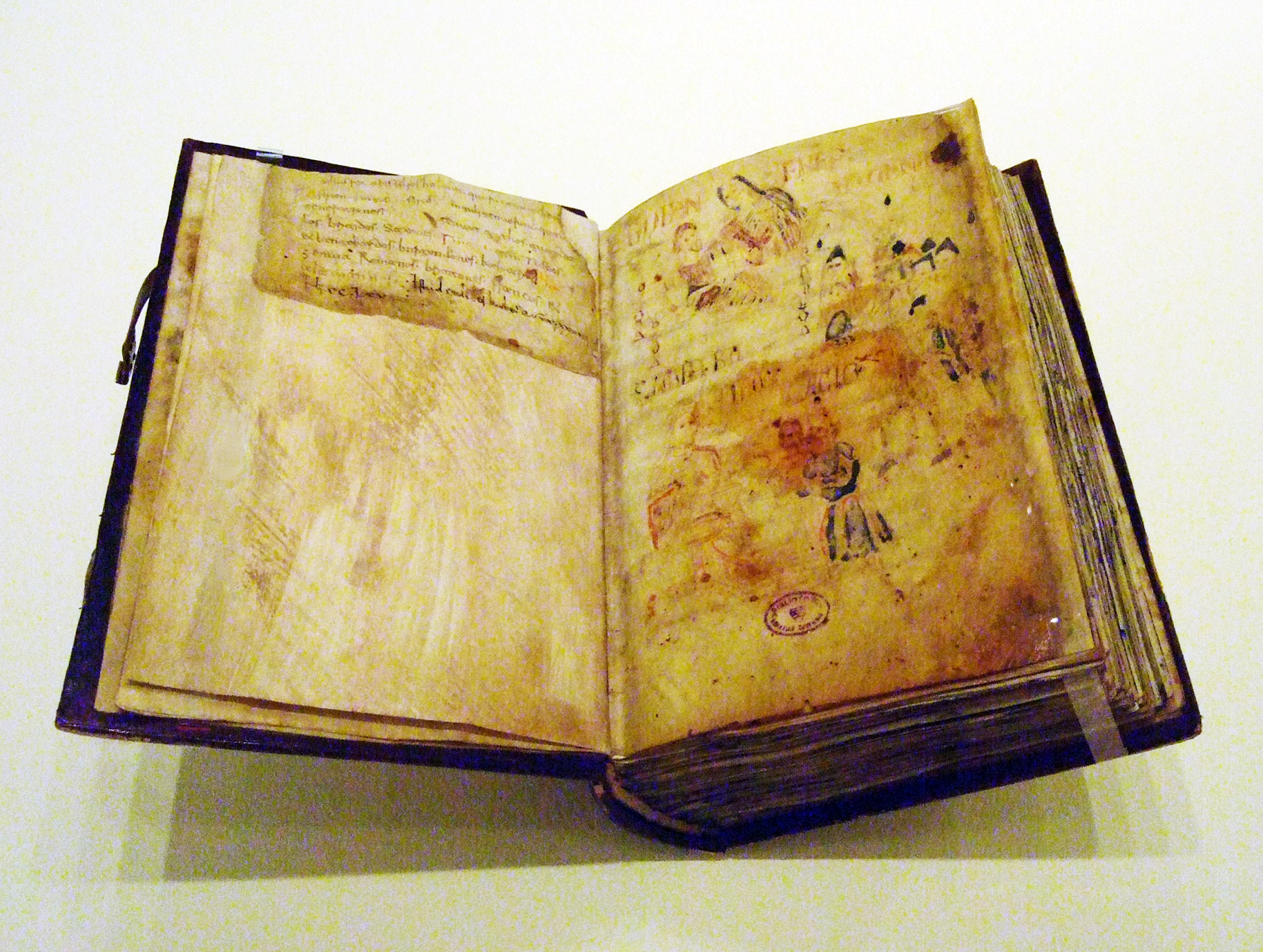
An 11th-century illustrated codex of Origo gentis Langobardorum, now in Salerno.

The Origo Gentis Langobardorum (Latin for "Origin of the tribe of the Lombards") is a short, 7th-century AD Latin account offering a founding myth of the Longobard people. The first part describes the origin and naming of the Lombards, the following text more resembles a king-list, up until the rule of Perctarit (672–688).

== Manuscripts ==
The account has been preserved in three codices, mostly containing legalistic writings compiled in the reign of Rothari and known as Edictum Rothari or Leges Langobardorum. As such, Origo Gentis Langobardorum is preserved in three manuscripts, Modena, Biblioteca Capitolare 0.I.2 (ninth or probably tenth century), Cava de' Tirreni, Archivio Della Badia 4, (dating to the early-eleventh century, ~1005 CE) and Madrid, Biblioteca Nacional 413 (tenth or first half of the eleventh century).

== Reception ==
Origo Gentis Langobardorum is also the textual source of the Lombard theonym godan (< *Wōdanaz).

The Origo is summarized somewhat faithfully in the Historia Langobardorum by Paulus Diaconus. For the legend of origin Paulus Diaconus makes separate text paragraphs for, respectively, the conflict with the Vandals and the consulting with Frea and Godan, and he precedes the description of Frea and Godan with "loco antiquitas ridiculam fabulam". Whereas the Origo is only extant in three copies, there are hundreds of medieval copies of the Historia.

== Contents ==
Following is a free translation.

Origin

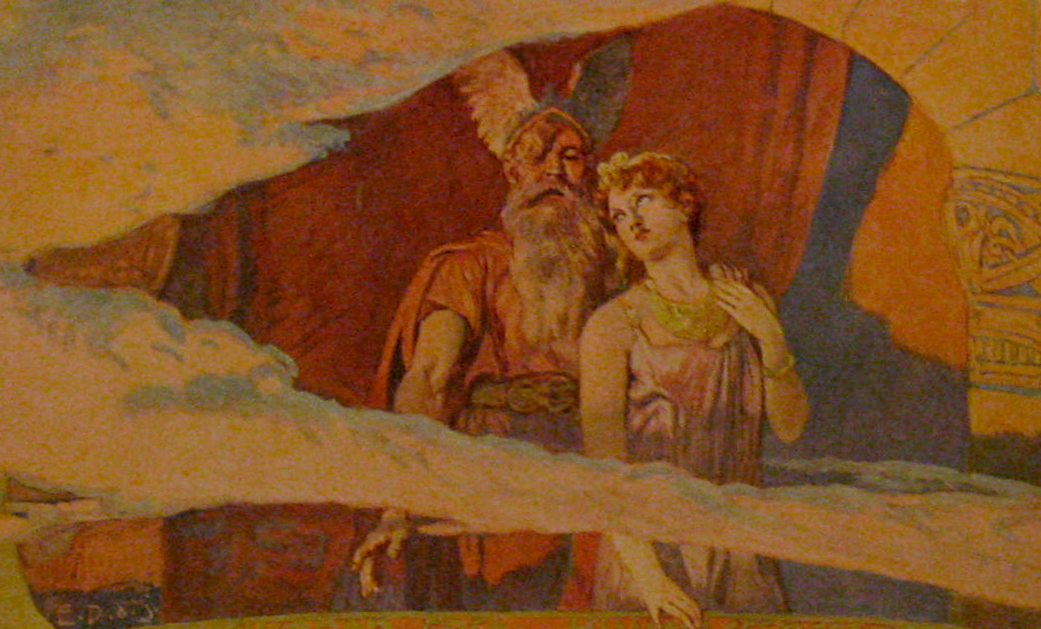
Wodan, with Frigga, looks down from their window in the heavens to the Winnili women below (1905) by Emil Doepler.

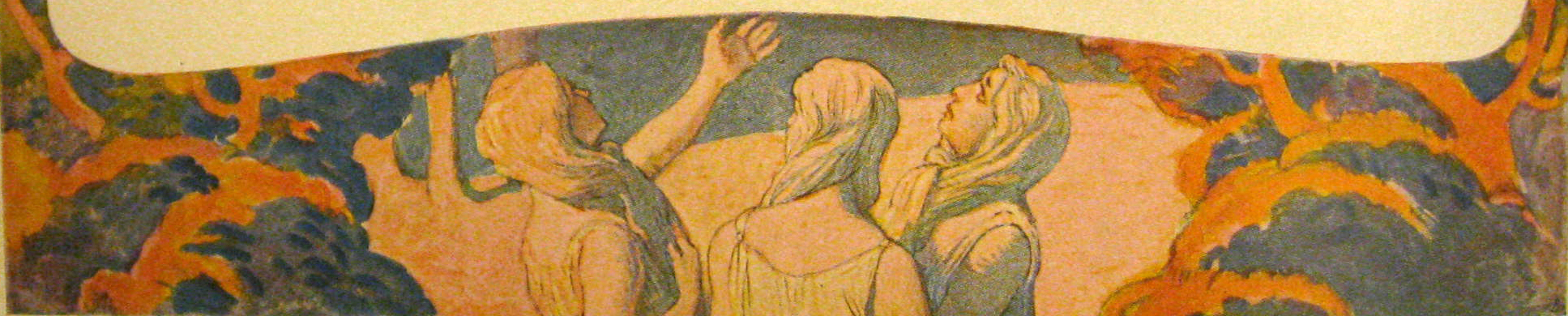
Winnili women with their hair tied as beards looking up at Wodan and Frigga (1905) by Emil Doepler.

The text mentions an island Scandanan, the home of the Winnili. Their rulers were Ybor and Agio whose mother, Gambara, was a wise and respected woman of the tribe. The leaders of the Vandals, Ambri and Assi, asked them to pay them tribute, but they refused, saying they would fight them. Ambri and Assi then went to Godan, and asked him for victory over the Winnili. Godan replied that he would give the victory to whomever he saw first at sunrise. At the same time, Gambara asked Frea, Godan's wife, for victory. Frea advised that the women of the Winnili should tie their hair in front of their faces like beards and join their men for battle. At sunrise, Frea turned her husband's bed so that he was facing east, and woke him. Godan saw the women of the Winnili, their hair tied in front of their faces, and asked "Who are these longbeards?", and Frea replied, since you named them, give them victory, and he did. From this day, the Winnili were called Langobardi, "longbeards".

Migration

After this, the Lombards migrated, and they came to Golaida (perhaps at the Oder), and later they ruled Aldonus and Anthaib (unclear, perhaps in Bavaria) and Bainaib (also Banthaib; perhaps in Bohemia) and Burgundaib (perhaps territory of the Burgundians, at the Middle Rhine ), and they chose as their king Agilmund, son of Agion, from the line of Gugingus, and later they were ruled by Laiamicho of the same dynasty, and after him Lethuc, who ruled for some 40 years. He was succeeded by his son, Aldihoc, and after him, Godehoc ruled.

The Danubian lands

Audochari came from Ravenna with the Alans, (Note: 487, Audochari fought the Rugii) and came to Rugilanda (Lower Austria, north of the Danube) to fight the Rugii, and he killed Theuvanue their king, and returned to Italy with many captives. The Lombards consequently left their land and lived in Rugilanda for some years.

Gudehoc was succeeded by his son, Claffo, and he by his son, Tato. The Lombards tarried at Feld for three years, where Tato fought and killed Rodolfo, king of the Heruli.

Wacho son of Unichus killed Tato, and Ildichus, Tato's son fought Wacho, but he had to flee to the Gepids, where he died. Wacho had three wives, the first Raicunda, daughter of Fisud, king of the Turingi, the second Austrigusa, a daughter of the Gippidi, who had two daughters, Wisigarda, who married Theudipert, king of the Franks, and Walderada, who married Suscald, another king of the Franks, who didn't like her and gave her to Garipald, and the third Silinga, daughter of the king of the Heruli, who had a son named Waltari, who succeeded Wacho and ruled for seven years. Farigaidus was the last of the line of Lethuc.

After Waltari ruled Auduin, who led the Lombards to Pannonia. Albuin, son of Auduin and his wife Rodelenda ruled after him. Albuin fought and killed Cunimund, king of the Gippidi. Albuin took to wife Cunimund's daughter, Rosemunda, and after she died Flutsuinda, daughter of Flothario, king of the Franks. She had a daughter called Albsuinda.

Italy

After the Lombards had lived in Pannonia for 42 years, Albuin led them into Italy, in the month of April, and two years later, Albuin was lord of Italy. (Note: 565, Albuin became lord of Italy) He ruled for three years before he was killed by Hilmichis and his wife Rosemunda, in the palace in Verona. The Lombards, however, didn't suffer Hilmichis to rule them, so Rosemunda called the prefect Longinus that he should capture Ravenna, and Hilmichis and Rosemunda escaped with Albsuinda, daughter of king Albuin, and the whole treasury of Ravenna. Longinus then tried to persuade Rosemunda to kill Hilmichis, so she might marry him, and she followed his advice and poisoned him, but as Hilmichis drank the poison, he realized what was happening, and he asked Rosemunda to drink with him, and they died together. Thus, Longinus was left with all the treasures of the Lombards, and with Albsuinda, the king's daughter, whom he carried away to the Emperor at Constantinople.

After Albuin, Cleph (Note: 572–574, Cleph) was king for two years. Then there followed an interregnum of twelve years, during which the Lombards were ruled by dukes. After this, Autarinus, (Note: 584–590, Autarinus) son of Claffo was king for seven years. He married Theudelenda, daughter of Garipald, and also Walderade of Bavaria. With Theudelenda came Gundoald her brother, and Autarinus made him duke of Asti.

Acquo, duke of the Turingi came from the Thaurini, and married queen Theudelenda, becoming king of the Lombards. He killed his enemies, Zangrolf of Verona, Mimulf of the Island of Saint Julian, Gaidulf of Bergamo, and others. With Theudelenda, he had a daughter called Gunperga, and he ruled for six years.

After him ruled Aroal, (Note: c. 624–636, Aroal) for twelve years, and after him Rothari (Note: 636–652, Rothari) of the Arodus family, and he broke the a city and fortress of the Romans, and he fought at the Scutella river, killing 8,000 Romans. Rothari ruled for 17 years, and after him Aripert (Note: 653– 661, Aripert) for nine years, and after him Grimoald, for nine years. After Grimoald, Berthari was king.

=== Chronology ===
There are no dates in Origo Gentis Langobardorum, but the following gives the chronology:

== See also ==
- Historia Langobardorum
- Historia Langobardorum codicis Gothani

== Editions ==
- Waitz, Georg, ed. (1878), "Origo Gentis Langobardorum", Scriptores rerum Langobardicarum et Italicarum saec. VI–IX, Monumenta Germaniae Historica . Scriptores rerum Langobardicarum et Italicarum (SS rer. Lang.), vol. 1, Hannover: Impensis Bibliopolii Hahniani, pp. 1–6
- Pertz, Georg Heinrich; Bluhme, Fredericus, eds. (1868), "Spicilegium e veteris Langobardorum edicti codicibus", Leges Langobardorum, Monumenta Germaniae Historica . Leges (in Folio) (LL), vol. 4, Hannover: Impensis Bibliopolii Hahniani, pp. 641–647
- Azzara, Claudio; Gasparri, Stefano, eds. (1992). Le leggi dei Longobardi: storia, memoria e diritto di un popolo germanico (in Italian). Milano: Editrice La Storia. pp. 2–7. ISBN 88-86156-00-6.
- Bracciotti, Annalisa, ed. (1998). Origo gentis Langobardorum (in Latin and Italian). Introduzione, testo critico, commento. Roma: Herder editrice e libreria. ISBN 88-85876-32-3.
