= Waldrada (Lombard) =

Queen consort of Austrasia
- Tenure: –555

Duchess consort of Bavaria
- Tenure: 556–572
- Born: 531
- Died: 572
- Spouse: Theudebald; Garibald I of Bavaria
- Issue: Theodelinda; Gundoald, Duke of Asti; Grimoald I Romilda of Friuli; Tassilo I of Bavaria; Chlotsuinda(?); Tochter von Bayern
- House: Lethings
- Father: Wacho
- Mother: Austrigusa

Waldrada (also Vuldetrada) (531–572), wife (firstly) of Theudebald, King of Austrasia (ruled 548–555), reputed mistress (secondly) of Chlothar I, King of the Franks (ruled until 561), was the daughter of Wacho, King of the Lombards (ruled ca. 510–539) and his second wife called Austrigusa or Ostrogotha, a Gepid.

The Origo Gentis Langobardorum names "Wisigarda…secundæ Walderada" as the two daughters of Wacho and his second wife, specifying that Waldrada married "Scusuald regis Francorum" and later "Garipald". The Historia Langobardorum names "Waldrada" as Wacho's second daughter by his second wife, specifying that she married "Chusubald rex Francorum". Paulus Diaconus names "Wisigarda…[et] secunda Walderada" as the two daughters of King Wacho & his second wife, specifying that Walderada married "Cusupald alio regi Francorum" and later "Garipald". Gregory of Tours names Vuldetrada as the wife of King Theodebald. Herimannus names "Wanderadam" wife of "Theodpaldus rex Francorum" when recording her second marriage to "Lotharius rex patris eius Theodeberti patruus".

According to Gregory of Tours, King Clotaire "began to have intercourse" with the widow of King Theodebald, before "the bishops complained and he handed her over to Garivald Duke of Bavaria", which apparently implies that King Clotaire did not marry Waldrada.

Preceded by none	Duchess of Bavaria; 556–572	Succeeded by Geila of Friuli
