= List of queens consort of the Lombards =

See also: List of kings of the Lombards

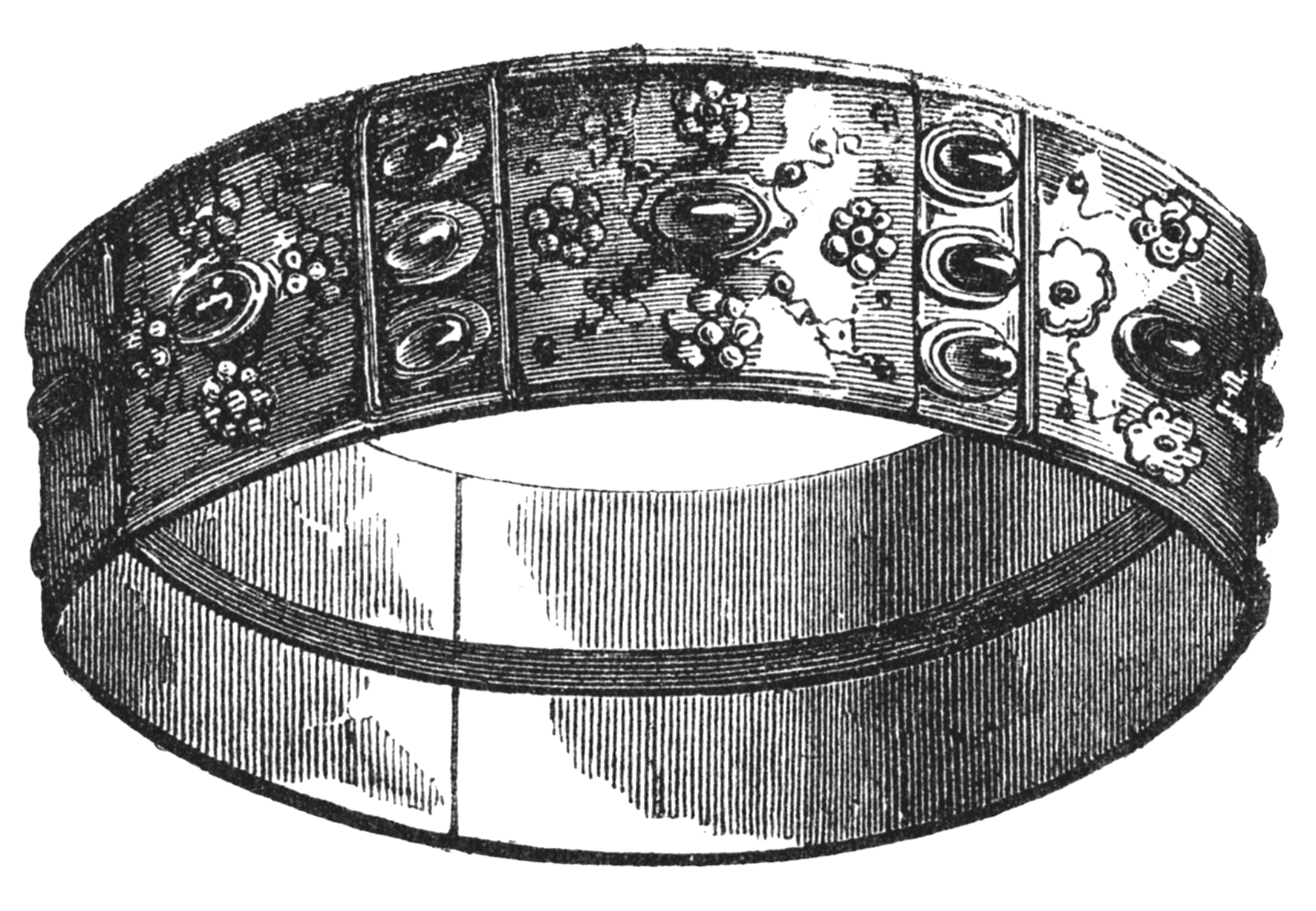
The Iron Crown of Lombardy (Corona Ferrea), that was used for the coronation of the Lombard kings and the kings of Italy thereafter for centuries, was the discovery of Theodelinda, a Lombard queen.

The queens consort of the Lombards were the wives of the Lombardic kings who ruled that Germanic people from early in the sixth century until the Lombardic identity became lost in the ninth and tenth centuries. After 568, the Lombard kings sometimes styled themselves Kings of Italy (rex totius Italiae), making their wives queens consort of Italy. After 774, they were not Lombards, but Franks. There was never a female Lombardic monarch due to the Salic law. After Queen Rosamund all the Lombard queens were also Queens of Italy.

== Queens consort of the Lombards ==
| Picture | Name | Father | Birth | Marriage | Became consort | Ceased to be consort | Death | Spouse |
|---|---|---|---|---|---|---|---|---|
| | Gambara | ? | ? | ? | ? | ? | ? | ? |
| | Radegund of the Thuringii | Bisinus, King of the Thuringii | ? | ? | ? | ? | ? | Wacho |
| | Austrigusa of the Gepids | Thurisind, King of the Gepids | ? | ? | ? | ? | ? | Wacho |
| | Silinga of the Heruli | Rodulf, King of the Heruli | ? | ? | ? | ? | ? | Wacho |
| | Rodelinda of the Thuringii | Hermanafrid, King of the Thuringii | ? | ? | 546 husband's ascession | 560 c. husband's death | ? | Audoin |
| | Chlothsind of the Franks | Chlothar I, King of the Franks (Merovingian) | ? | ? | ? | ? | ? | Alboin |
| | Rosamund of the Gepids | Cunimund, King of the Gepids | ? | 567 | | 28 June 572/573 husband's death | ? | Alboin |
| | Theodelinda of Bavaria | Garibald I, Duke of Bavaria (Agilolfings) | ? | 15 May 589 | | 5 September 590 husband's death | 22 January 627 | Agilulf |
| | Theodelinda of Bavaria | Garibald I, Duke of Bavaria (Agilolfings) | ? | May 591 | | 616 husband's death | 22 January 627 | Authari |
| | Gundiberga of the Lombards | Authari | 591 | ? | 626 husband's ascession, locked in monastery | 636 husband's death | ? | Arioald |
| | Gundiberga of the Lombards | Authari | 591 | after 636 | | 652 husband's death | ? | Rothari |
| | Rodelinda | ? | ? | ? | 661 husband's accession | 662 husband's deposition | 700 | Perctarit |
| | Rodelinda | ? | ? | ? | 671 husband's restoration | 688 husband's death | 700 | Perctarit |
| | Theodota of the Lombards | Aripert I | ? | after 662 | | no later than 671 (husband's death) | ? | Grimoald I |
No names of Lombardic queens are mentioned until 739.
| | Guntrude of Bavaria | Theodbert, Duke of Bavaria in Salzburg; Agilolfings | ? | ? | 712 husband's ascession | 744 husband's disposition | ? | Liutprand |
| | Tassia | ? | ? | ? | 744 husband's ascession | 749 husband's disposition | ? | Ratchis |
| | Ansa | Verissimo | ? | ? | 744 husband's ascession | 5 June 774 husband's disposition | ? | Desiderius |
| | Hildegard | Gerold of Vinzgouw | 758 | 771 | 5 June 774 husband's coronation as Lombardic king | 30 April 783 | | Charles I |
| | Fastrada of Franconia | Raoul III of Franconia | 765 | 784 as Queen consort the Lombards | | 10 October 794 | | Charles I |
| | Luitgard of Sundgau | Luitfrid II, Count of Sundgau (Etichonids) | 776 | 794 as Queen consort the Lombards | | 4 June 800 | | Charles I |
| | Bertha of Gellone | William of Gellone, Count of Toulouse | ? | 795? | 781 husband's ascension | 8 July 810 husband's death | ? | Pepin |
| | Cunigunda of Laon | ? | ? | 813 | | 17 April 818 husband's death | ? | Bernard I |
| | Ermengarde of Tours | Hugh of Tours (Etichonids) | 804 | 15 October 821 as sole queen 15 June 844 as senior queen | | 20 March 851 | | Lothair I |
| | Engelberga of Parma | Adelchis I, Count of Parma (Supponids) | 830 | 5 October 851 | | 12 August 875 husband's death | 896/901 | Louis II |
| | Richilde of Provence | Bivin of Gorze, Count of the Ardennes (Bosonid) | 845 | 870 | 12 August 875 husband's ascession | 6 October 877 husband's death | 2 June 910 | Charles II |
| | Richardis of Swabia | Erchanger, Count of the Nordgau (Ahalolfinger) | 840 | 862 | 879 husband's ascession | 887 husband's death | 18 September, between 894 and 896 | Charles III |

== See also ==
- List of Italian consorts
- List of Austrian consorts
- List of Hungarian consorts
- List of Bohemian consorts
