= Historia Langobardorum codicis Gothani =

The Historia Langobardorum codicis Gothani, also called the Chronicon Gothanum, is a history of the Lombard people written at and for the court of King Pippin of Italy between the years 806 and 810. It is preserved in the 10th/11th century Codex Gothanus 84 (Gotha, Forschungsbibliothek, Memb. I 84, ff. 336vb–338va), from which its conventional Latin titles are derived; (Note: Chronicon Gothanum means "chronicle from Gotha", and Historia Langobardorum codicis Gothani means "history of the Lombards from the codex of Gotha".) The chronicle is not titled in the manuscript. The text is ideologically pro-Carolingian, and among its sources are Isidore of Seville and possibly Jerome.

== Date, place and author ==
The Chronicon covers the period from the origins of the Lombards to the campaign of Pippin against Islamic Corsica: "Then the island of Corsica, oppressed by the Moors, his army liberated from their rule." This campaign is also recorded in the Annales regni Francorum, which place it in the year 806. Since the Chronicon also praises Pippin as if he is still living, it must have been written between the last event it records (806) and his death in 810.

Nothing about the author of the Historia Langobardorum codicis Gothani is known for certain. His pro-Carolingian stance has led some historians, such as Claudio Azzara and Stefano Gasparri, to believe that he was a Frank. Others, such as Stefano Cingolani, Bruno Luiselli and Magali Coumert, believe he was a Lombard, since in one passage he seems to identify with them when he refers to the Lombards during their time in Saxony as "our ancient forefathers". Another autobiographical detail is sometimes coaxed from the text when the author says that the remains of the residence of king Wacho were still visible in his day. Since Wacho was king during the Lombards' stay in Pannonia, and Pippin fought a war with the Avars in that region, it is possible that the author was with Pippin on the expedition and saw the remains of the house for himself. It is equally possible that he was merely reporting what he had heard.

The place of writing is also unknown: Coumert believes the author worked in the Abbey of Montecassino, while Walter Pohl hypothesised that it took place in Milan and Luigi Berto agrees that it is probably a north Italian work. Berto also concludes that the author was "probably a member of Pippin's court".

== Dependence on the Origo and Paul the Deacon ==
Azzara and Gasparri, in a recent critical edition of Lombard laws, posit that the Historia Langobardorum codicis Gothani is based in part on the Origo gentis langobardorum, a position supported by the Chronicon's initial editor, Friedrich Bluhme, who placed them side by side in the Monumenta Germaniae Historica. If this were the case, it would provide evidence for the circulation of the Origo some 150 years before the earliest surviving tenth-century copy, although the original text of the Origo may have been composed as early as the reign of Perctarit (671–88). In another critical edition of the Origo, Annalisa Bracciotti hypothesises that a "subarchetype" of the text tradition of the Historia Langobardorum codicis Gothani circulating in eighth-century Italy was used by Paul the Deacon for his Historia langobardorum. Cingolani argues that the Chronicon and the Origo made use of a common (now lost) source. Berto says that the Origo and "some other unknown texts" were the sources used by the author of the Chronicon.

Nicholas Everett believes that rather than drawing on the Origo or some earlier "Ur-Origo", the Historia Langobardorum codicis Gothani could have borrowed just as easily from Paul the Deacon, a theory also suggested by Walter Goffart. The Chronicon does not contain the story of Odin (Godan) and Frigg (Frea) that the Origo does, and it borrows text verbatim from Isidore explaining the original name of the Lombards (Winili) as derived from a river Vindilicus on the edges of Gaul and describing them as "prone to long beards and never shorn" (ad barba prolixa et numquam tonsa).

Among the stories that may have been borrowed from Paul, the Chronicon blames the Romans' weakness in the face of the Lombard invasion of Italy on a pestilence that occurred during the time of Narses, and the legendary Germanic hero Walter is an early king of the Lombards. The Chronicon also follows Paul in praising the heretical King Rothari because of his legislation, the Edictum Rothari: "In the time of King Rothari, a light arose in the darkness; through him, the aforementioned Lombards strove for canonical rules and became helpers of priests." The Chronicon diverges from Paul in calling Peredeo, the assassin of the first Lombard king in Italy, Alboin, a mere cubicularius, a type of eunuch.

== Unique themes ==
The Historia Langobardorum codicis Gothani is less detailed than the Origo in its narrative of the Lombards' migration from northern Europe to Italy. It says that the Lombards were descended from serpents and describes their movements as being guided by Providence towards a Promised Land (Italy). It credits God with raising them from the dung through conversion and baptism to be among the "number of the good" (numerum bonorum). It has been suggested that the Chronicon censors the pagan aspects of Lombard history, but while its narrative is more providential, it is not circumspect about the Lombards' paganism. The author argues that the Lombards came to Italy precisely to be saved, and reminds his readers that "where there is no law, sin is not to be imputed".

The Chronicon says that Alboin saw that God had predestined Pavia to be his capital, whereas Paul the Deacon has a story explaining how Pavia proved itself to be under divine protection. For all the kings of the Lombards after Alboin, the Chronicon gives only the length of reign, except for Rothari. Unlike Paul, the Chronicon does not mention that Rothari was an Arian.

The final sections of the Chronicon are full of lavish praise for Charlemagne and Pippin, the reigning king. The author praises Pippin's conquest of the duchy of Benevento, his victory over the Avars (Abari or Beowinides, i.e. "Bohemians") and his reconquest of Corsica in 806. In fact, Benevento was never fully subdued and Corsica was raided by the Moors again in 809 and conquered by them in 810. The Chronicon portrays the first decades of Carolingian rule in Italy as a golden age of peace and prosperity, in contrast to the Historia written by Andreas of Bergamo later that century, which portrays the time as a period of misfortunes and famine.

Magali Coumert argues that the Chronicon stresses continuity between the pagan Lombards and the Carolingians by portraying both the first Lombard king, Angelmund, and Pippin as both fighting the Beowinides (Avars). The two-hundred-year pact the pagan Lombards are said to have made with the Avars while in Pannonia then paved the way for their entry into Italy, and Pippin's victory over the Avars connects the Frankish conquest to the destiny of the now-Christian Lombards

== Editions ==
- "Origo gentis langobardorum et Chronicon gothanum", ed. Friedrich Bluhme. Monumenta Germaniae Historica, Leges langobardorum IV (Hanover, 1868), pp. 641–647.
- "Historia Langobardorum codicis Gothani", ed. Georg Waitz. Monumenta Germaniae Historica, Scriptores rerum Langobardorum (Hanover, 1878), pp. 7–11.
- (Latin with English translation) "Italian Carolingian Historical Texts", Luigi Andrea Berto, Pisa University Press, 2016, pp. 49-63
- Berto, Luigi Andrea, ed. (2002). Historia Langobardorum codicis Gothani. Testi storici e poetici dell'Italia carolingia (in Latin and Italian). Padova: Cleup. pp. 1–19. ISBN 88-7178-015-9.
