= Lethings =

Dynasty of Lombard kings

The Lethings (Italian: Letingi) were a dynasty of Lombard kings ruling in the 5th and 6th centuries until 546. They were the first Lombard royal dynasty and represent the emergence of the Lombard rulership out of obscurity and into history.

The Lethings were elected by an assembly of warriors. They took their dynastic name from Lethuc, the first known Lombard king. When Lethuc died and was replaced by Aldihoc, the Lombards took a step towards institutional stability. Under the Lethings, too, the Lombards, who had thitherto wandered around northern Europe, migrated south to the Danube and Pannonia. In 510, the reigning Lething, Tato, was displaced by his nephew, Wacho, and thereafter until 546 a cadet branch of the original house ruled. Under the last dynasts, the Lombards became a power in terms of their threat to the Byzantine Empire on par with the Ostrogoths and Franks.

The Lething were displaced when the child ruler Walthari was killed by his regent, Audoin, who then assumed the throne, inaugurating the Gausi dynasty. The Lething lineage did not die out, however, as Waldrada, a daughter of Wacho, had married Garibald I of Bavaria, and fostered a daughter, Theodelinda, who married Authari and became Queen of the Lombards. Her descendants were the Bavarian dynasty, a cadet branch of the Agilolfings, themselves Frankish.

== Sources ==
- Jarnut, Jörg (1995) [1982]. Storia dei Longobardi (in Italian). Translated by Guglielmotti, Paola. Torino: Einaudi. ISBN 88-06-13658-5.
- Rovagnati, Sergio (2003). I Longobardi (in Italian). Milano: Xenia. ISBN 88-7273-484-3.
