= 516th =

516th may refer to:

- 516th Aeronautical Systems Wing, wing of the United States Air Force assigned to Wright-Patterson Air Force Base, Ohio
- 516th Air Defense Group, disbanded United States Air Force organization
- 516th Infantry Regiment (United States) ("Bastogne Bulldogs"), a glider-borne regiment of the U.S. 101st Airborne Division
- 516th Signal Brigade (United States), forward based major subordinate operations and maintenance command of the 311th Signal Command
- 516th Strategic Fighter Squadron, inactive United States Air Force unit

== See also ==
- 516 (number)
- 516, the year 516 (DXVI) of the Julian calendar
- 516 BC
