= Rodelinda (6th century) =

Lombard queen

Rodelinda (6th-century), was a Lombard queen by marriage to king Audoin, and mother of king Alboin.

== Life ==
She was the first wife of Audoin, regent for the infant king of the Lombards Walthari from 540 to 546/547 and king in his own right from 546/547 to an uncertain date after 552, and gave him a son, his successor Alboin.

When the marriage took place is unclear. The contemporary Procopius speaks of a marriage arrangement between Audoin and an unnamed sister of Amalafrid, a prince of mixed royal Ostrogothic and Thuringian stock. The betrothal had been organized by the Byzantine Emperor Justinian at a date spanning from ca. 540 to 552, and this unnamed female may be the Rodelinda named by Paul the Deacon; but it has been objected to by the Prosopography of the Later Roman Empire that it is not certain that the marriage Procopius speaks of eventually took place. A major difficulty added to this is that in 552 Alboin was already a warrior. The PLRE believes the marriage between Audoin and Rodelinda took place in the 530s.

Other scholars instead tend to accept the identification, observing its importance in linking the Lombard kings with the bloodline of the Amali, the royal house of the Ostrogoths. Such a marriage would have made Audoin a legitimate heir to both the Ostrogothic and Thuringian thrones, the latter in particular as Audoin was already half-brother of the last king of the Thuringians, thus putting him in opposition to the Franks who had taken over most of the Thuringian lands.

Another explanation of Rodelinda's origins is given by István Boná: according to him she was probably a Bavarian princess, to be considered distinct from the Thuringian princess Audoin was engaged to later on.
