= Ludwig Schmitt =

Ludwig Schmitt may refer to:

- Ludwig Schmitt (chess player) (1902–1980), German chess master
- Ludwig Schmitt (footballer) (1910–after 1941), German footballer

== See also ==
- Ludwig Schmid (disambiguation)
- Ludwig Schmidt
