= 516 =

Calendar year

516 in various calendars
- Gregorian calendar: 516; DXVI
- Ab urbe condita: 1269
- Assyrian calendar: 5266
- Balinese saka calendar: 437–438
- Bengali calendar: −78 – −77
- Berber calendar: 1466
- Buddhist calendar: 1060
- Burmese calendar: −122
- Byzantine calendar: 6024–6025
- Chinese calendar: 乙未年 (Wood Goat); 3213 or 3006 — to — 丙申年 (Fire Monkey); 3214 or 3007
- Coptic calendar: 232–233
- Discordian calendar: 1682
- Ethiopian calendar: 508–509
- Hebrew calendar: 4276–4277
- Hindu calendars
- Vikram Samvat: 572–573
- Shaka Samvat: 437–438
- Kali Yuga: 3616–3617
- Holocene calendar: 10516
- Iranian calendar: 106 BP – 105 BP
- Islamic calendar: 109 BH – 108 BH
- Javanese calendar: 403–404
- Julian calendar: 516; DXVI
- Korean calendar: 2849
- Minguo calendar: 1396 before ROC 民前1396年
- Nanakshahi calendar: −952
- Seleucid era: 827/828 AG
- Thai solar calendar: 1058–1059
- Tibetan calendar: ཤིང་མོ་ལུག་ལོ་ (female Wood-Sheep); 642 or 261 or −511 — to — མེ་ཕོ་སྤྲེ་ལོ་ (male Fire-Monkey); 643 or 262 or −510

Year 516 (DXVI) was a leap year starting on Friday of the Julian calendar. At the time, it was known as the Year of the Consulship of Petrus without colleague (or, less frequently, year 1269 Ab urbe condita). The denomination 516 for this year has been used since the early medieval period, when the Anno Domini calendar era became the prevalent method in Europe for naming years.

== Events ==
=== By place ===
==== Europe ====
- Hygelac, king of the Geats (Sweden), raids the Lower Rhine, and is defeated by a Frankish force led by Theudebert (according to the "History of the Franks").
- King Gundobad of the Burgundians dies peacefully after a 43-year reign, and is succeeded by his eldest son Sigismund.

==== Great Britain ====
- Battle of Badon, British defeat of the Saxons, traditionally associated with King Arthur (traditional date)

==== Vietnam ====
- Emperor Wu appoints Lý Tắc, a Jiaozhou's state official, as the governor. Lý Tắc then suppresses the rebellion of Lý Tông Lão, a former subordinate of Lý Nguyên Khải, the previous governor of Jiaozhou, then beheads him to bring his head to Jiankang, as an offering to the emperor.

=== By topic ===
==== Religion ====
- November 6 – The Council of Tarragona (modern Spain) is held.

== Births ==
- Athalaric, king of the Ostrogoths (d. 534)
- Ciarán of Clonmacnoise, Irish bishop (d. 546)

== Deaths ==
- Gundobad, king of the Burgundians
- Hygelac, king of the Geats (approximate date)
- John, Coptic Orthodox patriarch of Alexandria
- Oisc, king of Kent (approximate date)
