= Ranrike =

Old name for a part of Viken

Ranrike (Old Norse Ránríki) was the old name for a part of Viken, corresponding to southeast Norway (Oslofjord area) and the northern half of the modern Swedish (Norwegian until 1658) province of Bohuslän (roughly identical with Álfheimr of Scandinavian mythology). When folklore and culture is concerned the usage has been revived to refer to northern Bohuslän.

== Etymology ==
The name Ranrike is sometimes said to have derived its name from Old Norse goddess of the sea, Rán. There is no clear etymology of Rán. As the Indo-Europeans did not have a word for 'sea', it may not be Indo-European, in which case it would be older than the Nordics in the region. Jordanes does give us a terminus ante quem for the use of Ragnaricii/Ranii: One king, Rodwulf of the Ranii (identified by some with Ranrike), had left his kingdom to join Theodoric the Great in Ravenna.

There is a possible parallel in the name Hålogaland, if the name means "sacred land" or "land of the sacred". In any case, the position of Ragnaricii next to Raumaricii (Romerike) indicates that it is probably the same as Ranrike, believed to be named after the goddess of the sea, Rán (Ran-riki, "reich of Ran or, as sometimes translitterated in 19th century sources, Rån"). Another parallel supports this derivation: Pliny the Elder's Saevo mountain range, probably meaning "sea land", refers in part to Ranrike (see under Scandinavia). Moreover, Rán is the name of a dangerous goddess, who raises storms at sea and collects the drowned in her net. Such a name support the "dangerous island" etymology of Scandinavia. However, there is no conclusive evidence for any particular interpretation.

== Jordanes ==
The Gothic scholar Jordanes mentions two peoples named the Aeragnaricii (3.23) and the Ranii (3.24) who lived in Scandza (Scandinavia). Aeragnaricii appears in series. It is usually interpreted as a scribal error for *ac ragnaricii, "and the Ragnaricii". The latter word is easily open to translation, coming from two segments, riki "kingdom" and ragna "of the rulers", meaning the gods (see under Ragnarök). Both words come from Indo-European *reg-, "rule".

== Heimskringla ==
In his Heimskringla, Snorri Sturluson relates how it first accepted the Swedish king Erik Emundsson as its ruler, only to be punished by the Norwegian king Harald Fairhair who spent a winter terrorizing the province from the sea.

== See also ==
- Germanic peoples
- Norsemen

== Sources ==
- Sigurdsson, Jon Vidar (2008). Det norrøne samfunnet. Oslo: Pax. ISBN 978-82-530-3147-7.
- Norseng, Per G.; Nedkvitne, Arnved (2000). Middelalderbyen ved Bjørvika: Oslo 1000-1536. Oslo: Cappelen. ISBN 978-82-02-19100-9.
- Helle, Knut (1964). Norge blir en stat, 1130–1319. Universitetsforlaget. ISBN 82-00-01323-5.
- Rosbach, Johan Hammond (2002). Levende ord: Etymologi for alle. Oslo: Aventura. ISBN 978-82-588-0253-9.
- Taube, Evert (1982). Strovtag i Ranrike. En Bok for alla. Litteraturframjandet. ISBN 978-91-7448-174-7.
- Mierow, Charles Christopher (1915). The Gothic History of Jordanes: In English with an Introduction and a Commentary, Reprinted 2006. Evolution Publishing. ISBN 978-1-889758-77-0.
