= Codex Gothanus 84 =

Latin law parchment manuscript

The Codex Gothanus 84 is a 10th/11th century Latin law parchment manuscript in two-column Carolingian minuscule and is one of two extant copies of a lost early ninth-century codex written at Fulda and commissioned by Eberhard of Friuli, probably about 830, from the scholar Lupus Servatus, abbot of Ferrières. It is held by the Gotha Research Library (Gotha, Forschungsbibliothek, Memb. I 84), hence its name.

The manuscript contains laws useful in the administration of Friuli, preceded by a text of the origins of the Lombards, probably compiled before the death of Pepin of Italy (810). According to Walter Pohl it is written from a Carolingian and Christian perspective, substituting for the Longobardi origin myth concerning Wotan a controlling sense of Providence. The Monumenta Germaniae Historica version (MGH SRL, pp 7-11) calls it Historia Langobardorum Codicis Gothani. The opening and closing of the Codex Gothanus are so different from the Origo Gentis Langobardorum and Paul the Deacon that Thomas Hodgkin, Italy and Her Invaders (vol VI 1880:146, note B) printed them separately rather than attempt to weave them into a coherent whole.
