= Garibald I of Bavaria =

Duke of Bavaria from 555 to 591

Garibald I
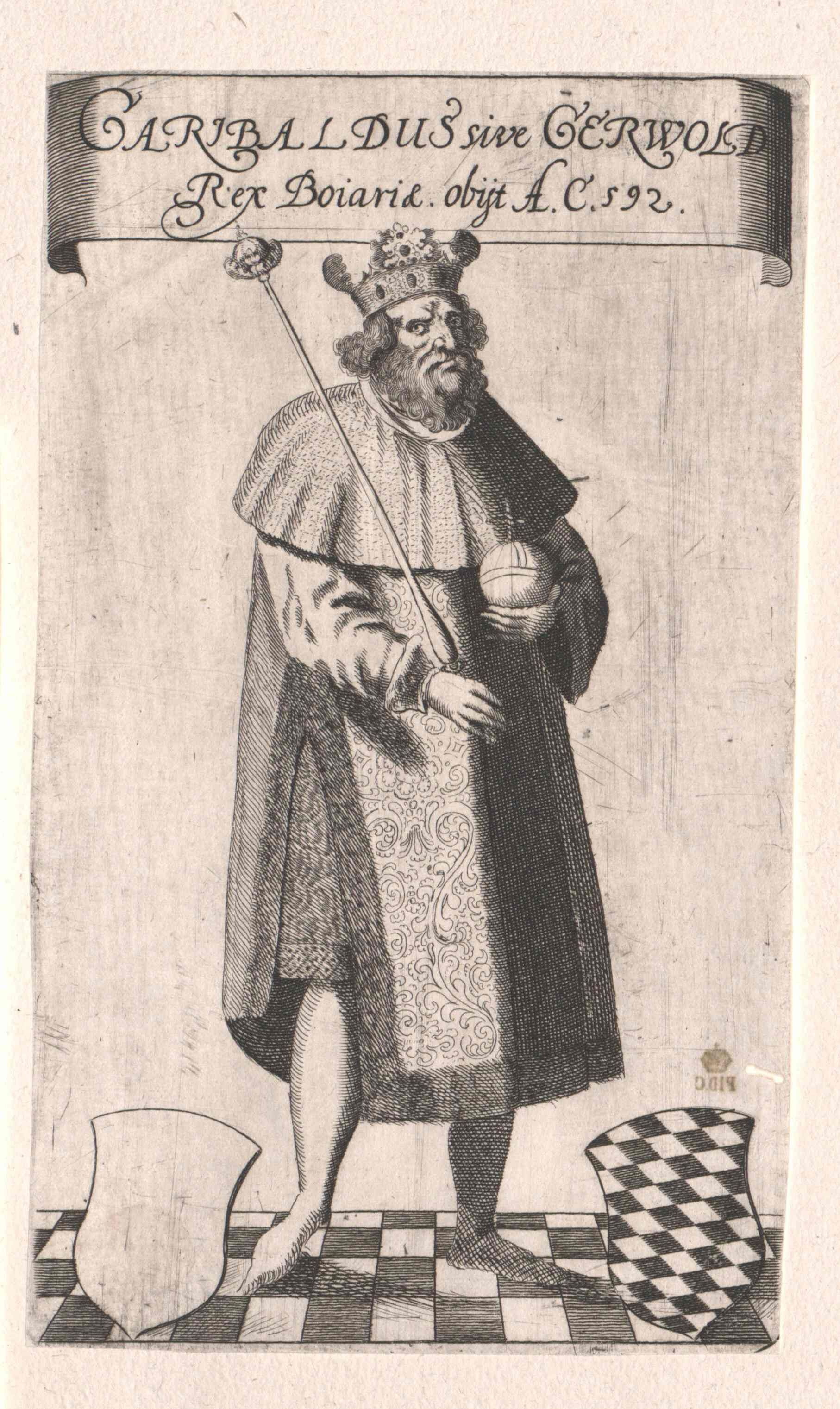
- Non-contemporary engraving of Garibald I

Duke of Bavaria
- Reign: 555–591
- Successor: Tassilo I
- Born: c. 540; Bavaria
- Died: c. 591
- Spouse: Waldrada
- Issue: Theodelinda; Gundoald, Duke of Asti; Grimoald I Romilda of Friuli; Tassilo I of Bavaria; Tochter von Bayern
- House: Agilolfings (founder of the Bavarian dynasty)

Garibald I (also spelt Garivald; Latin: Garibaldus; born c. 540) was Duke (or king) of Bavaria from 555 until 591.

He was the first known ruler of Bavaria and the head of the Agilolfings, a noble family of Frankish origin. Garibald is regarded as the founder of the Bavarian dynasty, and an ancestor of several prominent figures in the Kingdom of the Lombards.

== Biography ==
After the death of the Merovingian king Theudebald of Austrasia, his successor Chlothar I had "begun to have intercourse with" his widow Waldrada, daughter of the Lombard king Wacho. Chlothar's bishops objected, so he gave Waldrada to Garibald to marry in 556. Not only did this grant Garibald prestige, but it created lasting political ties between the Bavarii and the Lombards of Pannonia and Bohemia. This would have consequences after the Lombards moved into Italy in 568.

Sometime before 585, the Merovingian court attempted to bind Duke Garibald more closely to its interests by arranging a marriage between his daughter Theodelinda and King Childebert II of Austrasia. At the same time, the Merovingians were attempting to normalise relations with the Lombard king Authari by arranging a marriage between Childebert's sister and Authari. Both these proposals fell through. The offended Authari was engaged to Theodelinda in 588.

According to the Nuremberg Chronicle, Chilperic, king of the Franks, was a bitter enemy of Authari. Fearing an anti-Frankish axis, Chilperic sent an army into Bavaria and overran the kingdom of Garibald and drove him out of Bavaria. Garibald fled to his son-in-law.

Authari married Theodelinda at Verona in May 589 and named his brother-in-law, Gundoald, Duke of Asti. In 590, the Franks invaded Lombardy with help from Byzantium, but were defeated.

In 591, Childebert normalised relations with the Lombards and Bavarii. After King Authari died in 590, the Lombard dukes asked Theodelinda to marry again. She chose Authari's cousin Agilulf as her husband, and he was accepted as the next king. They then negotiated a peace with Childebert, which lasted for decades. According to Paulus Diaconus, peace with Bavaria was restored when Childebert named Tassilo rex (king).

It is unknown whether Garibald was deposed or died. Nor is it clear what Tassilo's relationship to Garibald was; if not his son, he was certainly a close relation. Garibald was reportedly the father of Romilda of Friuli.

== Sources ==
- Gregory of Tours, History of the Franks: Books I–X, Book IV, Chapter 9
- Störmer, Wilhelm. "Die Baiuwaren: Von der Völkerwanderung bis Tassilo III." pp. 59–64. Verlag C. H. Beck, 2002, ISBN 3-406-47981-2

Preceded by New creation	Duke of Bavaria; 555–591	Succeeded by Tassilo I
