= Theudebald =

Merovingian king of Austrasia (535-555)

Theudebald *Þeudubalþ

King of Metz & Rheims (Austrasia)
- Reign: 548–555
- Predecessor: Theudebert I
- Successor: Chlothar I
- Born: c. 534
- Died: c. 555 (aged 21)
- Spouse: Waldrada
- House: Merovingian dynasty
- Father: Theudebert I
- Mother: Deuteria

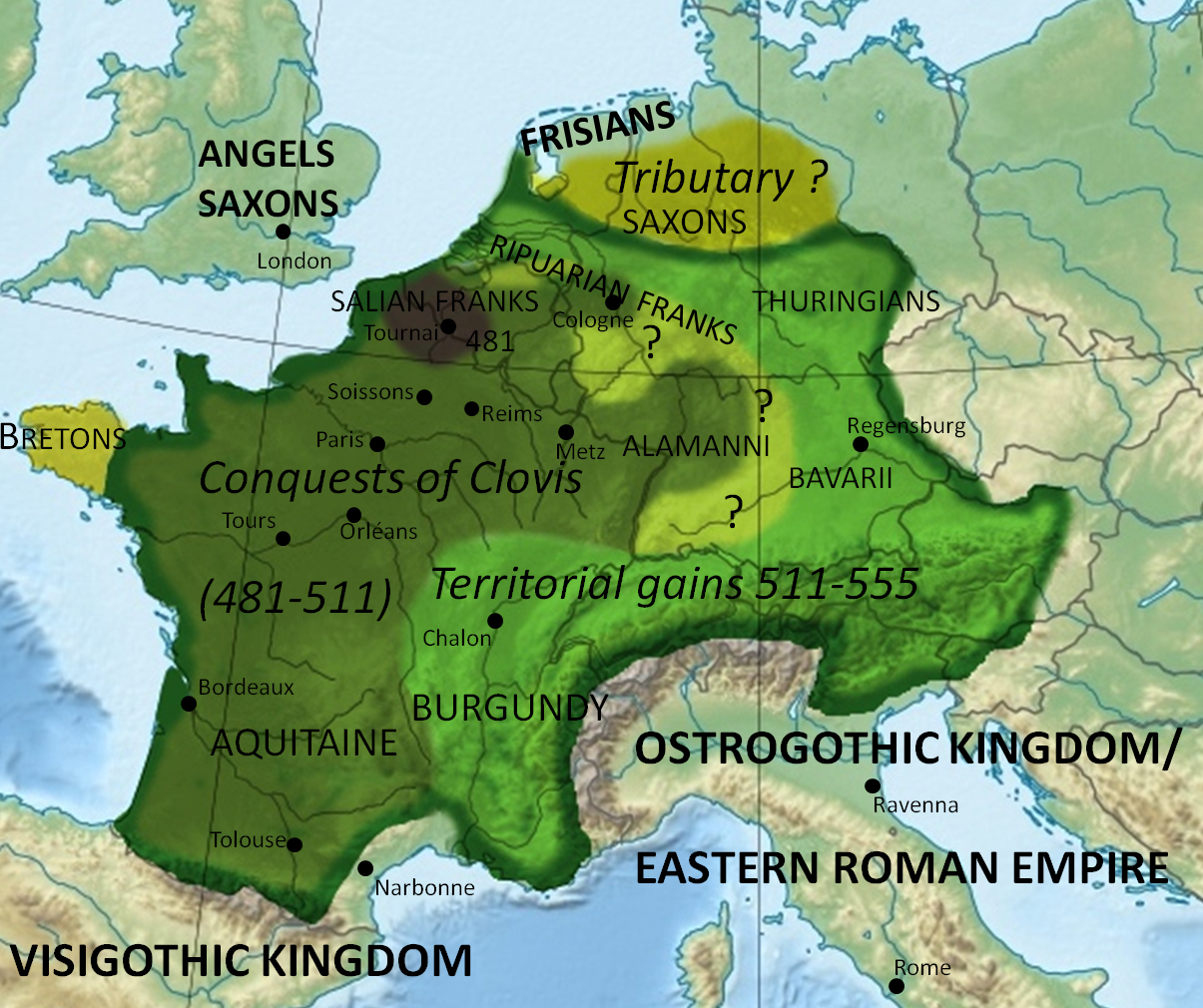
The Frankish Empire in 555, the year of Theudebald's death

Theudebald (in modern English, Theobald; in French, Thibaut or Théodebald; in German, Theudowald) (534 – 555), son of Theudebert I and Deuteria, was the king of Metz, Rheims, or Austrasia—as it is variously called—from 548 to 555. He was a great-grandson of Clovis I (c. 466 – 511), the progenitor of the Merovingian dynasty and first king of the Franks, who united all Frankish tribes under one ruler.

He was only thirteen years of age when he succeeded and of ill health. However, the loyalty of the nobility to his father's memory preserved the peace during his minority. He married Waldrada, daughter of the Lombard king Wacho and his step-aunt, sister to his father's second wife, Wisigard. This marriage fortified the alliance between Austrasia and Lombardy.

Nevertheless, Theudebald could not hold on to the conquests of his father in the north of Italia. The Byzantine Emperor Justinian I sent an army under the command of Narses in 552. The Gothic king Teia called upon the Franks for help. Although King Theudebald refused to send aid, he allowed two of his subjects, the Alemanni chieftains Leutharis and Butilinus, to cross into Italy. The Franks who did not perish of want or plague in Apulia were defeated at Casilinum.

In 550, Theudebald called the Council of Toul, apparently because Nicetius, bishop of Trier, had begun excommunicating Frankish aristocrats who contracted marriages within the prohibited degree of consanguinity.

After a prolonged sickness and prostration, he died in 555. His realm passed finally outside of the family of Theuderic I and was united to the kingdoms of his granduncle Chlothar I, who would soon become king of all the Franks.

Theudebald Merovingian Dynasty Born: 535 Died: 555
Preceded by Theudebert I	King of Rheims; 548–555	Succeeded by Clotaire I
