= Josef Svennung =

Swedish philologist

- Born: 7 January 1895
- Died: 11 March 1985 (aged 90)

Academic work
- Discipline: Classical philology
- Institutions: Uppsala University

Josef Gusten Algot Svennung (7 January 1895 - 11 March 1985) was a Swedish classical philologist. He was Professor of Latin Language and Literature at Uppsala University from 1944 to 1961. Svennung is particularly known for his research on what Jordanes and other classical writers wrote about Scandza and the rest of Northern Europe.

== Selected works ==
- Orosiana. Syntaktische, semasiologische und kritische Studien zu Orosius, 1922
- Palladii Rutilii Tauri Aemiliani viri illustris Opus agriculturae. Liber quartus decimus de veterinaria medicina, 1926
- Om Palladius' De medicina pecorum, 1929
- Wortstudien zu den spätlateinischen Oribasiusrezensionen, 1932
- Untersuchungen zu Palladius und zur lateinischen Fach- und Volkssprache, 1935
- Kleine Beiträge zur lateinischen Lautlehre, 1936
- Compositiones Lucenses. Studien zum Inhalt, zur Textkritik und Sprache, 1941
- Catulls Bildersprache, 1945
- "Vitala stad" och det forna Vetlanda, 1947
- Belt und Baltisch. Ostseeische Namenstudien. Mit besonderer Rücksicht auf Adam von Bremen, 1953
- Den värendska arvsrätten, 1956
- Anredeformen. Vergleichende Forschungen zur indirekten Anrede in der 3. Person und zum Nominativ für den Vokativ, 1958
- Svearnas ö och sithonerna hos Tacitus, 1962
- Från senantik och medeltid: latinska texter av kulturhistoriskt intresse, 1963
- Scandinavia und Scandia: lateinisch-nordische Namenstudien, 1963
- Jordanes und Scandia, 1967
- Zur Geschichte des Goticismus, 1967
- Skandinavien bei Plinius und Ptolemaios : kritisch-exegetische Forschungen zu den ältesten nordischen Sprachdenkmälern, 1974
