= 546 =

Calendar year

546 in various calendars
- Gregorian calendar: 546; DXLVI
- Ab urbe condita: 1299
- Assyrian calendar: 5296
- Balinese saka calendar: 467–468
- Bengali calendar: −48 – −47
- Berber calendar: 1496
- Buddhist calendar: 1090
- Burmese calendar: −92
- Byzantine calendar: 6054–6055
- Chinese calendar: 乙丑年 (Wood Ox); 3243 or 3036 — to — 丙寅年 (Fire Tiger); 3244 or 3037
- Coptic calendar: 262–263
- Discordian calendar: 1712
- Ethiopian calendar: 538–539
- Hebrew calendar: 4306–4307
- Hindu calendars
- Vikram Samvat: 602–603
- Shaka Samvat: 467–468
- Kali Yuga: 3646–3647
- Holocene calendar: 10546
- Iranian calendar: 76 BP – 75 BP
- Islamic calendar: 78 BH – 77 BH
- Javanese calendar: 434–435
- Julian calendar: 546; DXLVI
- Korean calendar: 2879
- Minguo calendar: 1366 before ROC 民前1366年
- Nanakshahi calendar: −922
- Seleucid era: 857/858 AG
- Thai solar calendar: 1088–1089
- Tibetan calendar: ཤིང་མོ་གླང་ལོ་ (female Wood-Ox); 672 or 291 or −481 — to — མེ་ཕོ་སྟག་ལོ་ (male Fire-Tiger); 673 or 292 or −480

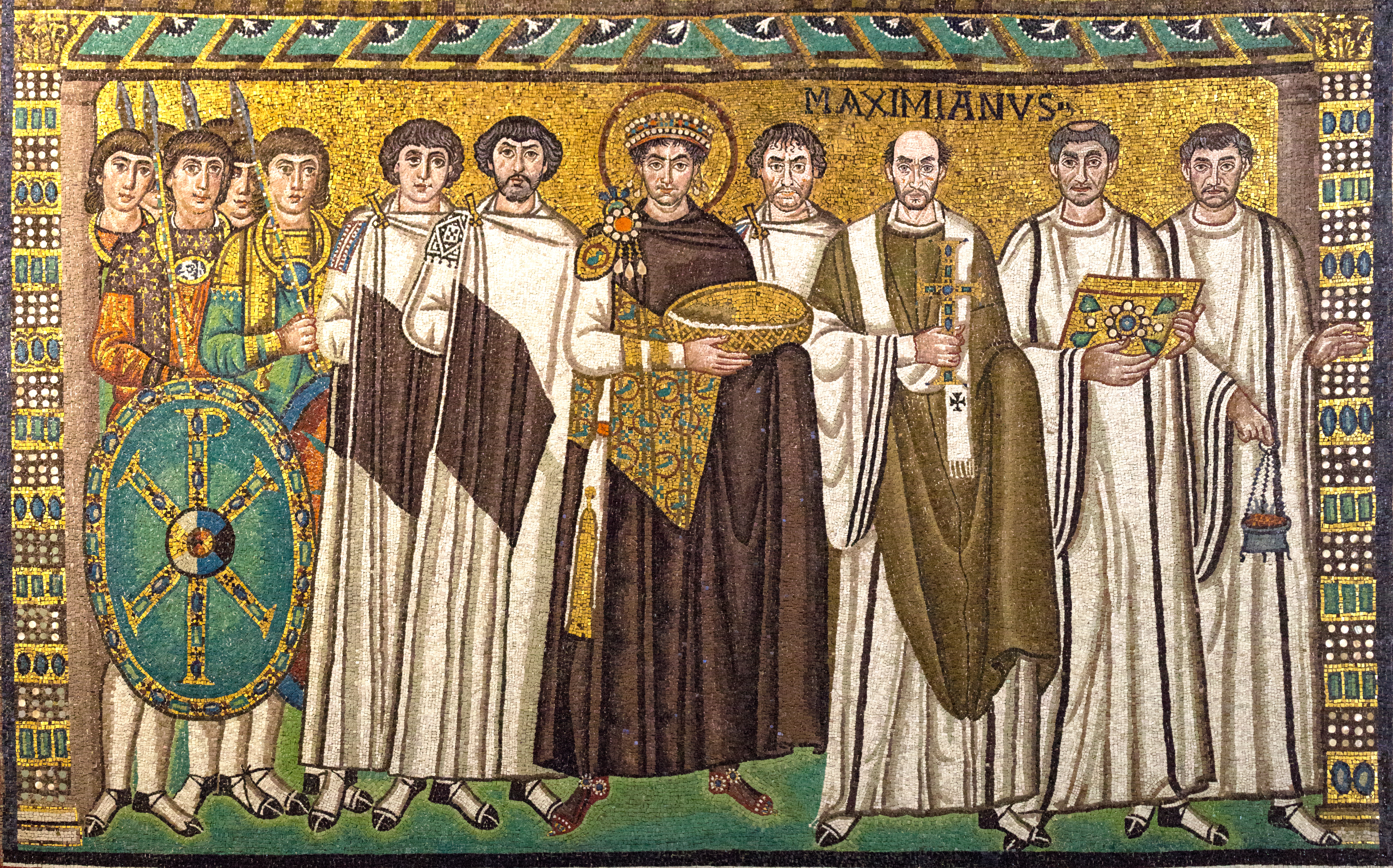
Emperor Justinian I with Maximian of Ravenna

Year 546 (DXLVI) was a common year starting on Monday of the Julian calendar. The denomination 546 for this year has been used since the early medieval period, when the Anno Domini calendar era became the prevalent method in Europe for naming years.

== Events ==
=== By place ===
==== Byzantine Empire ====
- December 17 – Sack of Rome: After almost a year's siege, the capture of a grain fleet sent by the exiled Pope Vigilius near the mouth of the Tiber, and failure of troops of the Byzantine Empire under Belisarius to relieve the city, the Ostrogoths under King Totila plunder Rome and destroy its fortifications. He then withdraws to Apulia (Southern Italy).
- Winter – Pope Vigilius arrives in Constantinople, to meet with Emperor Justinian I. The future Pope Pelagius I is sent by Totila to negotiate with Justinian.

==== Europe ====
- Audoin murders and succeeds Walthari as king of the Lombards.
- Audoin receives subsidies from Justinian I, to encourage him to battle the Gepids in the Carpathian Mountains.
- Audoin leads the Lombards across the Danube into Pannonia, and becomes an ally of the Byzantines.

==== Central America ====
- May 5 – First Tikal-Calakmul War: After a victory by Calakmul, Aj Wosal Chan K'inich is installed as the new ruler of the Mayan city state of Naranjo in Guatemala, and reigns until his death in 615.

=== By topic ===
==== Religion ====
- The Basilica of San Vitale (Ravenna) is completed by bishop Maximianus, during the Byzantine Exarchate of Ravenna.
- Approximate date – The Diocese of Bangor is established in the Welsh kingdom of Gwynedd, with Deiniol consecrated as first bishop.

== Deaths ==
- Walthari, king of the Lombards
