= Deuteria =

- Queen consort of Austrasia
- Spouse: Unknown 1st Husband; Theudebert I
- Issue: Adia; Theudebald

Deuteria or Deoteria (fl. 540), was a Frankish queen consort; the first spouse of king Theudebert I.

Deuteria belonged to an aristocratic Gallo-Roman family from Auvergne and was a relation to Sidonius Apollinaris, Saint Avitus and Emperor Avitus. She was living in Septimania, married and had a daughter, Adia, when the area was attacked by Theudebert I in 533.

He fell in love with her, and when he became king the same year, he sent for her. She left her husband but brought her daughter with her to court, where Deuteria and Theudebert became lovers. At this point, her husband was still alive and Theudebert was engaged to Wisigard, a Lombard princess. It has never been confirmed whether the couple ever performed a wedding ceremony or not. Theudebert continued to be engaged to Wisigard, and Deuteria is sometimes called a concubine, but Deuteria is almost without exception referred to as Queen, despite this insecurity.

According to Gregory of Tours, in 536 Deuteria had her daughter drowned in fear of her becoming a rival over Theudebert. After the murder, the aristocracy had Theudebert expel Deuteria from court and forced him to marry Wisigarde. It is said that he wished to recall Deuteria after Wisigard's death in 540, but did not dare to.
