= Tato, King of the Lombards =

6th-century king of the Lombards

Tato (died 510) was an early 6th century king of the Lombards. He was the son of Claffo and a king of the Lething Dynasty.

According to Procopius, the Lombards were subject and paid tribute to the Heruli during his reign. In 508, he fought with King Rodulf of the Heruli, who was slain. This was a devastating blow to the Heruli and augmented the power of the Lombards. According to Paul the Deacon, the war started because Tato's daughter Rumetrada murdered Rodulf's brother.

Tato was murdered by his nephew Wacho in 510.

Regnal titles
Preceded by Claffo	King of the Lombards – 510	Succeeded by Wacho
