= Scandza =

Region described by Gothic-Byzantine historian Jordanes

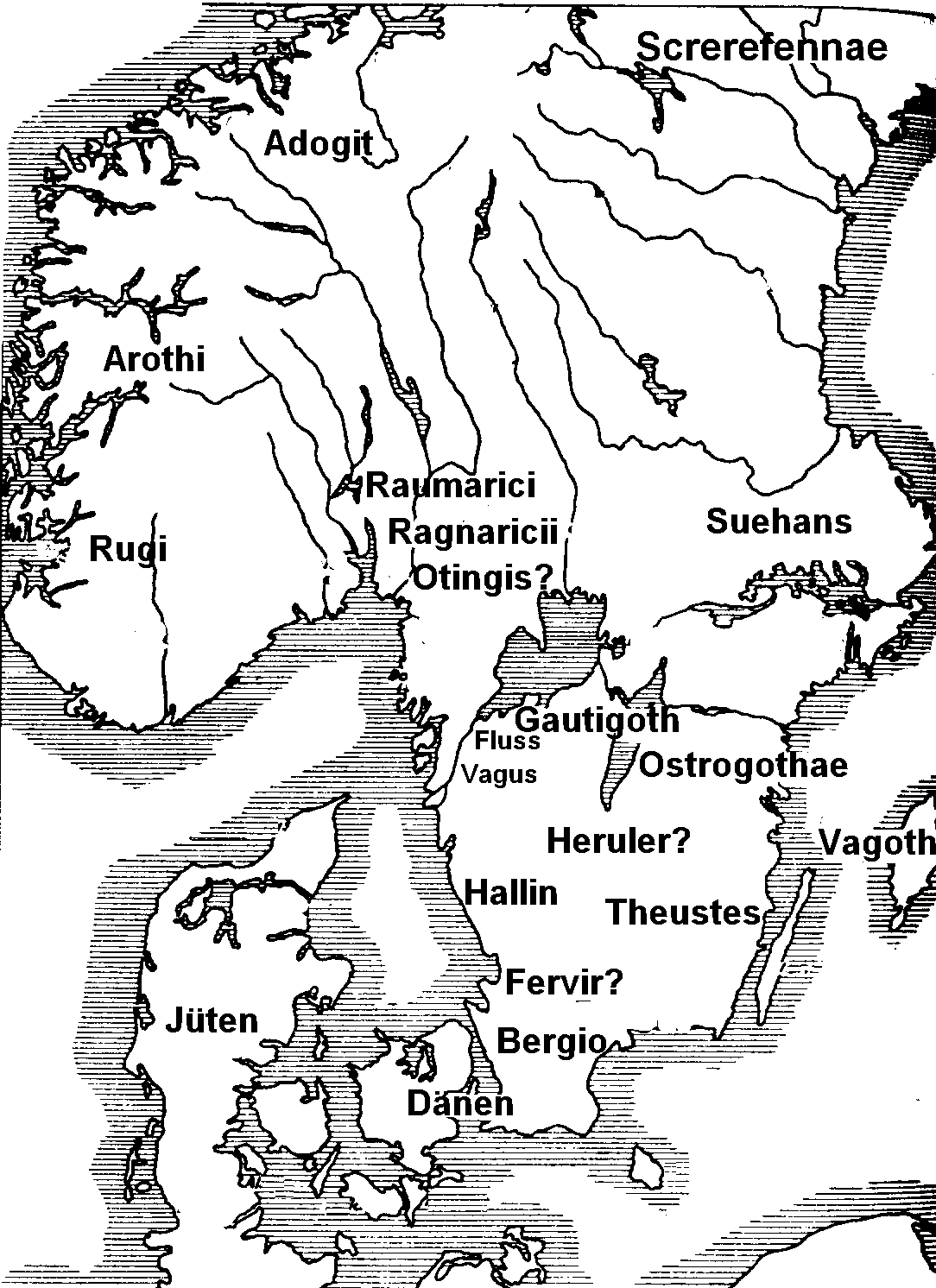
Possible map of Scandza, with a selection of tribes

Scandza was described as a "great island" by Gothic-Byzantine historian Jordanes in his work Getica. The island was located in the Arctic regions of the sea that surrounded the world. The location is usually identified with Scandinavia.

Jordanes was a Roman citizen living in Constantinople but described himself as being of Gothic descent. His Getica, written in 551 AD, gives a history of the Goths, beginning in Scandza from where they later migrated to Gothiscandza, near the mouth of the Vistula River. The Swedish archaeologist Göran Burenhult describes this account as a unique glimpse into the tribes of Scandinavia in the 6th century.

== Geographical description through history ==
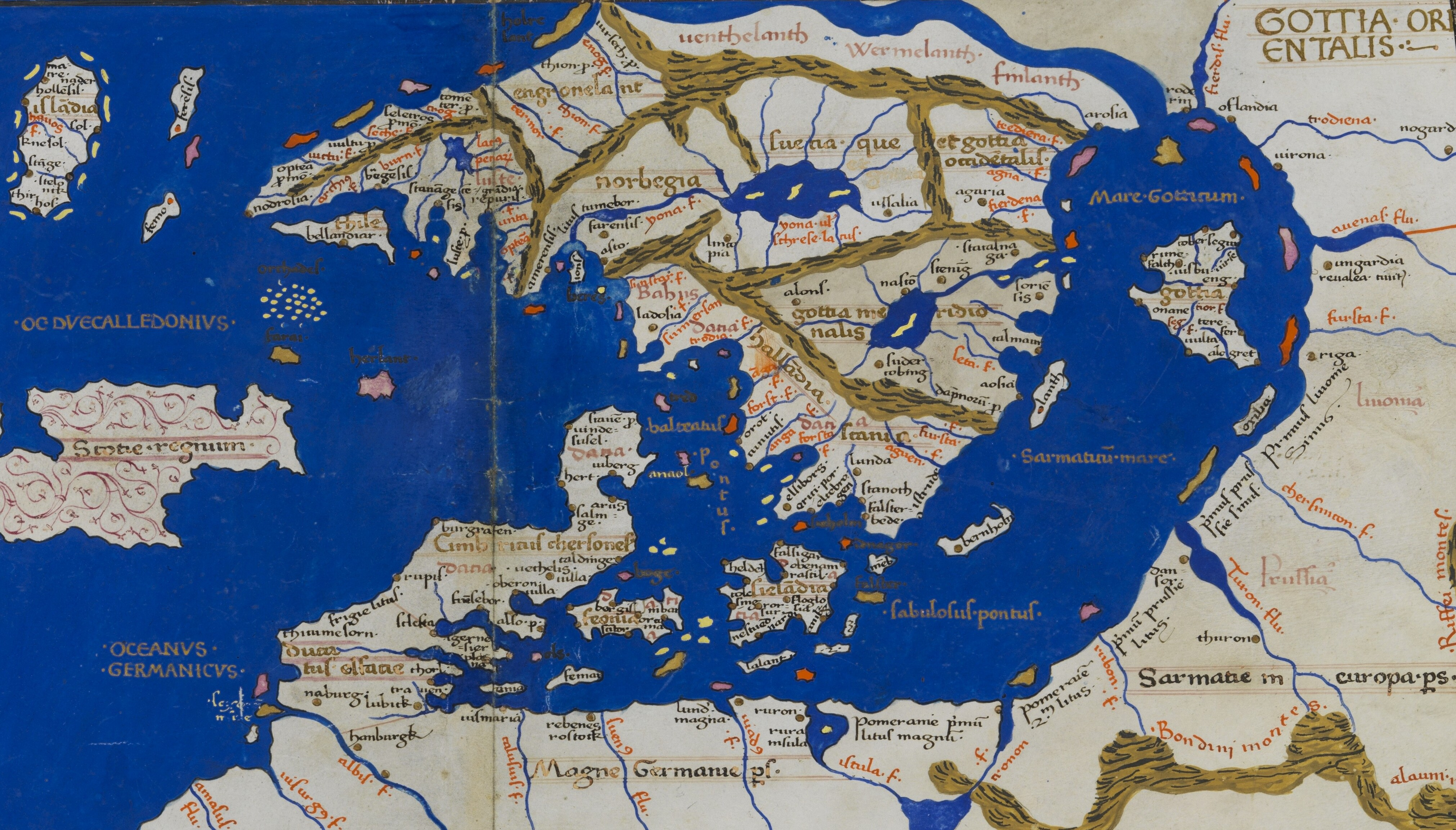
Map of the Scandiae islands by Nicolaus Germanus for a 1467 publication of Cosmographia Claudii Ptolomaei Alexandrini

Early Greek and Roman geographers used the name Scandia for various uncharted islands in Northern Europe. The name originated in Greek sources and then into Latin, which used it for a long time for different islands in the Mediterranean region. In the Iliad the name denotes an ancient city in Kythira, Greece. The first attested written use of the name for a Northern European island appears in the work of Roman Pliny the Elder, Naturalis Historia of c. AD 77. Pliny described "Scandia" as an island located north of Britannia. This island does not appear to be the same as the island Pliny calls "Scatinavia", located near Cimbri. In Claudius Ptolemy's Geographia, written in the 2nd century AD, Scandia is described as the most easterly of the Scandiae islands, a group of islands located east of the Cimbrian peninsula. This is the region where Pliny had located "Scatinavia".

When Scandinavian scholars became familiar with the Roman records in the Middle Ages, Scandiae was used as an alternative Latin name for Terra Scania. The early 13th-century Latin paraphrase of the Scanian Law bears the title Lex Scandiae provincialis.

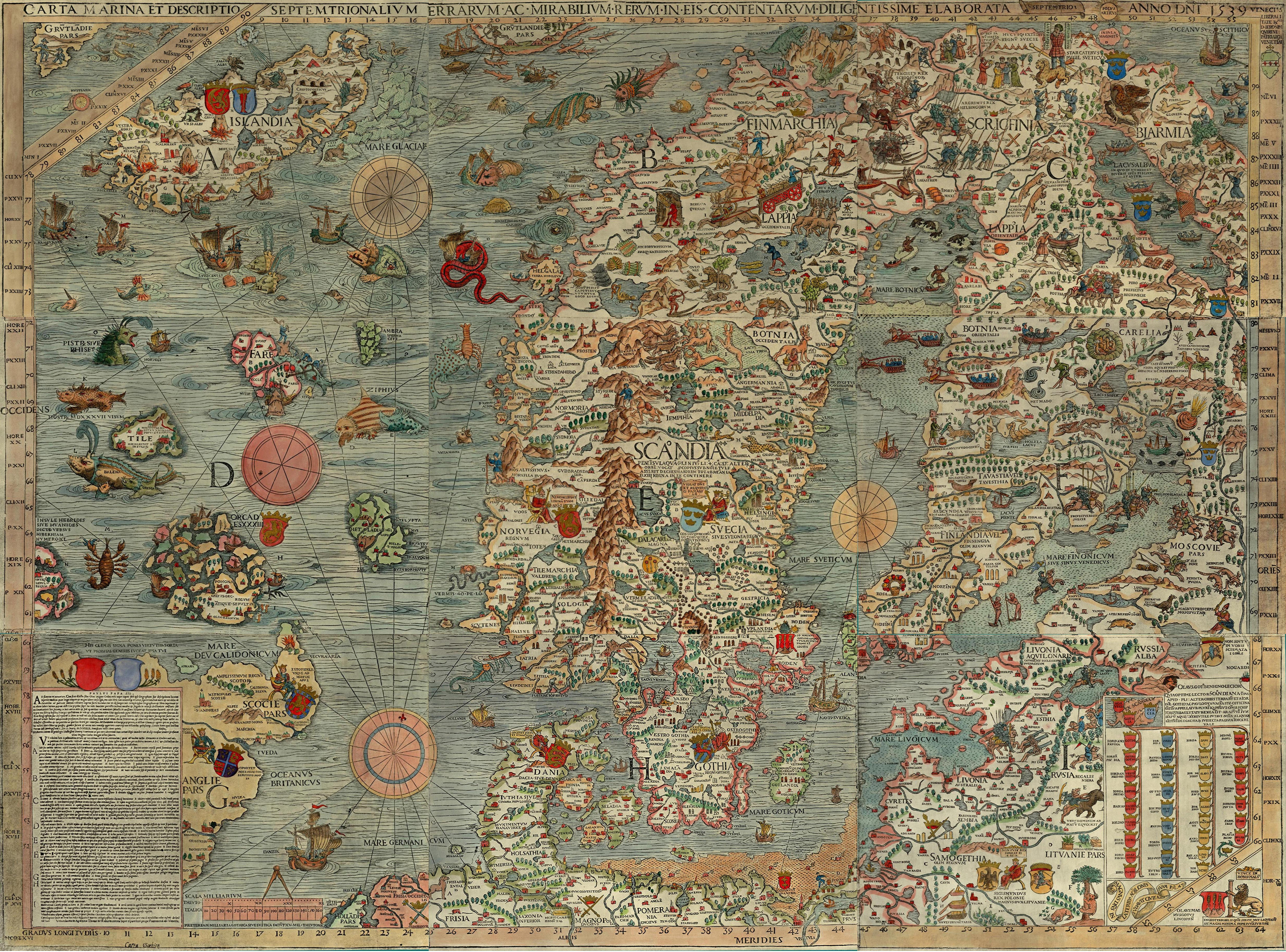
The Carta Marina from 1539 by Olaus Magnus

Jordanes referred to Ptolemy's description of Scandia "as a great island shaped like a juniper leaf" (i.e. long and not round) "having bulging sides and which tapered down in the south at a long end". He also referred to Pomponius Mela's description of Codanonia (called Scatinavia by Pliny the Elder) which was located in the Codanian Gulf (probably Kattegat). "This island was in front of the Vistula and that there was a great lake" "from which sprang the river Vagus". "On the western and northern side it was surrounded by an enormous sea", "but in the east there was a land bridge which cut off the sea in the east forming the Germanic Sea". "There were also many small islands" (the Swedish and Finnish archipelagos) "where wolves could pass when the sea was frozen. In winter the country was not only cruel to people but also to wild beasts. Due to the extreme cold there were no swarms of honey-making bees."

In the 16th century, Olaus Magnus, a Swedish cartographer familiar with Pliny's writings, created a map where he placed the name "Scandia" in the middle of today's Sweden. In Olaus Magnus' map, the name denotes an area including "Svecia" (Svealand), "Gothia" and "Norvegia" (Norway), where he places various tribes described by the ancient geographers.

Although mainly a historical name, Scandia still occasionally continues in use today as a Latin name for Scandinavia. The Scandinavian Bishops Conference, an Episcopal Conference organized by the Catholic Church since 1923, is called Conferentia Episcopalis Scandiae.

== Midsummer sun and the midwinter darkness ==
In the north, there was the nation of the Adogit (perhaps referring to the inhabitants of Hålogaland in Norway or the people of Andøya) who lived in continual light during the midsummer (for forty days and nights) and in continual darkness (for as long) during the midwinter. Due to this alternation they go from joy to suffering (the first description of the Scandinavian winter depression). The sun moreover seemed to pass along the horizon rather than rise from below.

== Inhabitants ==
Jordanes names a multitude of tribes living in Scandza, which he described as a "workshop producing peoples" or a "womb of nations" (officina gentium aut certe velut vagina nationum), and says they were taller and more ferocious than the Germans. The listing represents several instances of the same people named twice, which was probably due to the gathering of information from diverse travellers and from Scandinavians arriving to join the Goths, such as Rodwulf from Bohuslän. Whereas linguists have been able to connect some names to regions in Scandinavia, there are others that may be based on misunderstandings.

On the island there were the Screrefennae (i.e., Sami peoples), who lived as hunter-gatherers, subsisting on birds's eggs and a variety of swamp game.

There were also the Suehans (Swedes), who had splendid horses like the Thuringians. (Snorri Sturluson wrote that the 6th-century Swedish king Adils had the best horses of his time). They were the suppliers of black fox skins for the Roman market, and they were richly dressed, even though they lived in poverty.

There were also the Theustes (the people of the Tjust region in Småland); Vagoths (probably the Gutes of Gotland); Bergio (either the people of Bjäre Hundred in Skåne, according to L Weibull, or the people of Kolmården according to others); Hallin (southern Halland); and the Liothida (either the Luggude Hundred or Lödde in Skåne, though others connect them to Södermanland), who lived in a flat and fertile region, due to which they were subject to the attacks of their neighbours.

Other tribes were the Ahelmil (identified with the region of Halmstad); the Finnaithae (Finnhaith-; i.e., Finnheden, the old name for Finnveden); the Fervir (the inhabitants of Fjäre Hundred); and the Gautigoths (the Geats of Västergötland), a nation which was bold and quick to engage in war.

There were also the Mixi, Evagreotingis (or the Evagres and the Otingis depending on the translator), who live like animals among the rocks (probably the numerous hillforts; Evagreotingis is believed to have meant the "people of the island hill forts," which best fits the people of southern Bohuslän).

Beyond them, there were the Ostrogoths (Östergötland), Raumarici (Romerike), the Ragnaricii (probably Ranrike, an old name for the northern part of Bohuslän) and the most gentle Finns (probably the second mention of the Sami peoples). The Vinoviloth (possibly remaining Lombards, vinili) were similar.

He also named the Suetidi, a second mention of the Swedes, although it is also possible that the term "Suetidi" could be equated with the term "Svitjod". The Dani were of the same stock and drove the Heruls from their lands. Those tribes were the tallest of men.

In the same area there were the Granni (Grenland), Augandzi (Agder), Eunixi, Taetel, Rugii (Rogaland), Arochi (Hordaland), and Ranii (possibly the people of Romsdalen). The king Rodulf was of the Ranii but left his kingdom and joined Theodoric, king of the Goths.

== See also ==
- Germanic peoples
- Gothicismus

== Sources ==
- Burenhult, Göran (1996) Människans historia, VI.
- Nerman, B. Det svenska rikets uppkomst. Stockholm, 1925.
- Ohlmarks, Å. (1994). Fornnordiskt lexikon
- Ståhl, Harry (1970) Ortnamn och ortnamnsforskning, AWE/Gebers, Uppsala.
