= Ludwig Schmidt =

German historian

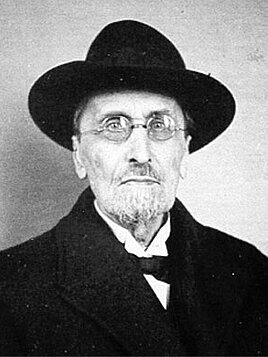
- Born: 18 July 1862; Dresden, Kingdom of Saxony
- Died: 10 March 1944 (aged 81); Dresden, Germany
- Awards: Knight's Cross 1st Class of the Albert Order (1910)

Academic background
- Education: Leipzig University

Academic work
- Discipline: History
- Institutions: Saxon State and University Library Dresden
- Main interests: History of the Germanic peoples during the Migration Period
- Notable works: Die Geschichte der deutschen Stämme bis zum Ausgang der Völkerwanderung (1904-1918)

Ludwig Schmidt (18 July 1862 – 10 March 1944) was a German historian and librarian at the Saxon State and University Library Dresden. He is best known for his magnum opus, Die Geschichte der deutschen Stämme bis zum Ausgang der Völkerwanderung (1904-1918), which up to the present day remains the standard reference work on the history of the Germanic peoples in the Migration Period.

== Biography ==
Ludwig Schmidt was born in Dresden, Kingdom of Saxony on 18 July 1862. He studied history at Leipzig University from 1881 to 1884, during which he developed an interest in Late Antiquity and the Early Middle Ages. Wilhelm Arndt and Heinrich Bernhard Christian Brandes were among his professors. His 1884 dissertation was on the history of the Lombards. After his graduation, Schmidt was employed by the Saxon State and University Library Dresden, where he was appointed Senior Librarian in 1919 and Deputy Director in 1921. He received the title of Professor in 1907, was soon afterwards made Corresponding Member of the Prussian Academy of Sciences and Full Member of the Saxon Academy of Sciences and Humanities. Schmidt received the Knight's Cross 1st Class of the Albert Order in 1910. He retired on 31 December 1925.

== Research ==
Ludwig Schmidt specialized in the history of the Germanic peoples during the Migration Period. His magnum opus, Die Geschichte der deutschen Stämme bis zum Ausgang der Völkerwanderung, was published in 1904–1918. It has since been revised and republished in numerous editions. In the second edition published in 1934, which disagrees with Nazi theories, Schmidt spoke out against the politicization of history by the Nazi authorities. Schmidt's book is based almost entirely on primary sources, on which Schmidt had gained a complete overview during his time as a university librarian. From the early 20th century up to modern times, his book has been an essential resource for historians on the history of the Germanic peoples during the Migration Period. The book is listed by the Oxford Classical Dictionary (2012) as a primary resource on the Germanic peoples.

== See also ==
- E. A. Thompson
- J. B. Bury
- Lucien Musset
- Peter Heather

== Sources ==
- Drinkwater, John Frederick (2012). "Germans". In Hornblower, Simon; Spawforth, Antony; Eidinow, Esther (eds.). The Oxford Classical Dictionary (4 ed.). Oxford University Press. p. 613. doi:10.1093/acref/9780199545568.001.0001. ISBN 9780191735257.
- Heather, Peter (1994). Goths and Romans 332–489. Oxford Scholarship Online. doi:10.1093/acprof:oso/9780198205357.001.0001. ISBN 9780198205357.
- Kulikowski, Michael (2006). Rome's Gothic Wars: From the Third Century to Alaric. Cambridge University Press. ISBN 978-1139458092.
- Springer, Matthias [in German] (2004). "Schmidt". Reallexikon der Germanischen Altertumskunde (in German). Vol. 27. Walter de Gruyter. pp. 190–193. ISBN 3110181169.
- Eigenwill, Reinhardt (1 December 2011). "Ludwig Schmidt". Sächsische Biografie (in German). Institut für Sächsische Geschichte und Volkskunde.
