= Wisigard =

Merovingian queen of the Franks

Wisigard (c. 510 – c. 540) or Wisigardis was a Frankish Queen by marriage to Theudebert.

== Life ==
The life of Wisigard is slightly known by Gregory of Tours's Historia Francorum. She was daughter of Wacho, king of the Lombards and grew up in the middle Danube region. After an abnormally long term of engagement of seven years, Wisigard married Theudebert I, Merovingian king of Austrasia. Around 531 Theuderich I, father of Theudebert I, had arranged the engagement for political reasons. However, because of a liaison Theudebert had with a Roman woman named Deuteria, the union with Wisigard fell through. Later, seven years after the original betrothal, pressure from Wisigard's brothers induced Theudebert to abandon Deuteria and finally marry Wisigard in 537 or 538. Shortly after their wedding, Wisigard died.

== Burial site ==
In 1959 a very rich decorated grave of a Frankish woman was found by Otto Doppelfeld in the Cologne Cathedral. The woman had been buried with her precious jewellery and in a traditional costume that indicated her as a Lombardish princess. Based on the dating and the grave furniture, Doppelfeld, at that time director of the Romano-Germanic Museum, interpreted the dead woman as Wisigard. However, this interpretation is not proved by an inscription or other sources.

== Sources ==
- Gregory of Tours, Historiarum III, 20, 27.
