= Theudebert I =

Merovingian king of Austrasia (c. 500–547)

Theudebert I *Þeuduberht
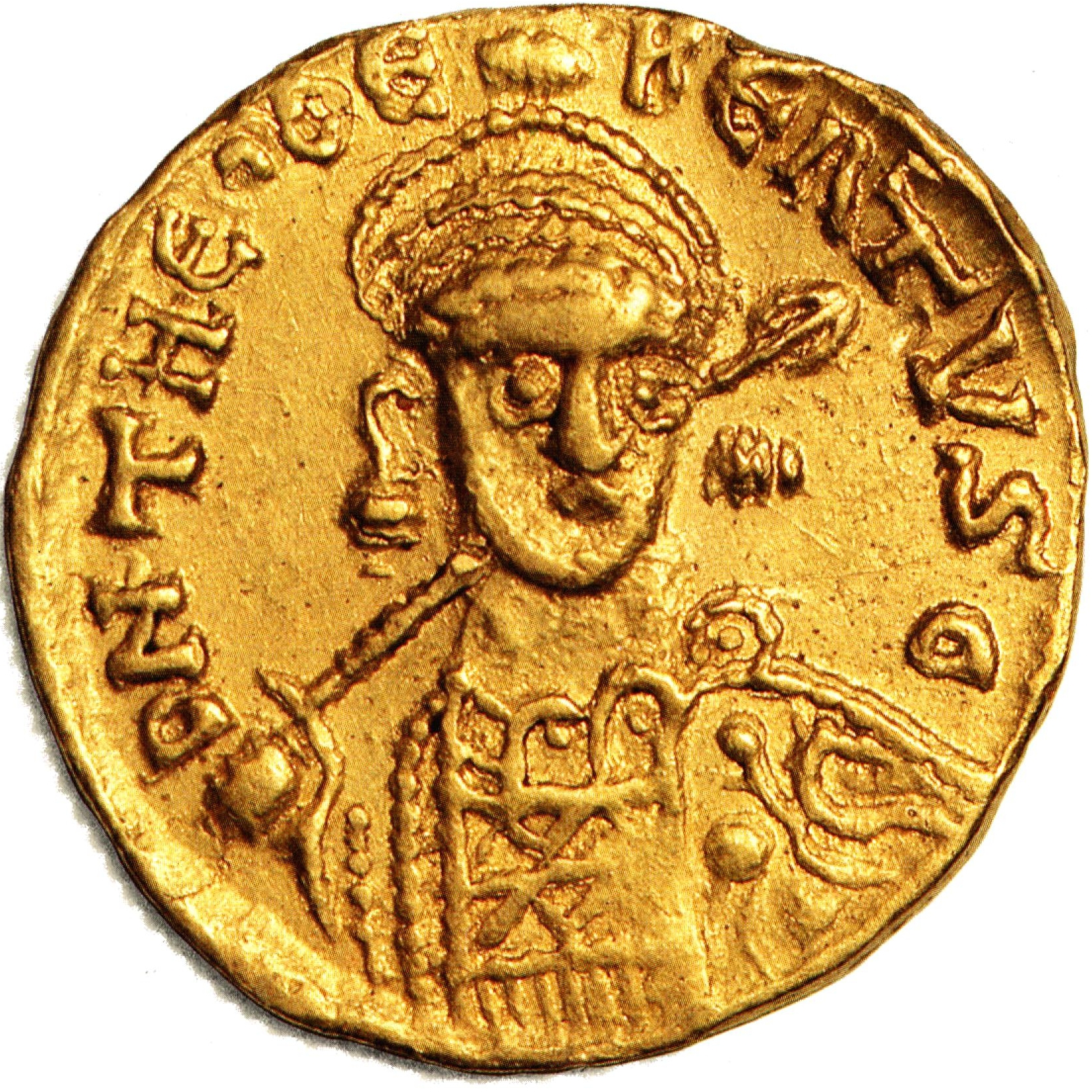
- Solidus of Theudebert minted at Mainz around 534

King of Austrasia
- Reign: 534–548
- Predecessor: Theuderic I
- Successor: Theudebald
- Born: c. 500
- Died: 548 (aged 48)
- Spouse: Wisigard; Deuteria
- Issue: Theudebald; Berthoara
- House: Merovingian dynasty
- Father: Theuderic I

Theudebert I (French: Thibert/Théodebert) (c. 500–548) was a Merovingian king of Austrasia, one of the principal Frankish kingdoms, from 534 to his death.

He was the son and successor of Theuderic I, and both shared the ambition of elevating Frankish power through territorial expansion. Before taking the throne, he repelled Danish naval raids and campaigned against the Visigoths in the south. Upon the death of his father, he secured his succession against his two uncles. After coming to an understanding, they formed an alliance together to conquer Burgundy in 534. Later, he exploited the Gothic War (535–552) between the Ostrogoths and Byzantines to invade northern Italy and gain control over Liguria and Venetia regions.

Theudebert asserted his independence from the Byzantine emperor Justinian I in their correspondence, boasting of his hegemony stretching from the North Sea to the Danube River and into Pannonia. He became the first king to challenge Roman convention by issuing gold coins that featured his own portrait instead of that of the emperor. Domestically, contemporaries like Gregory of Tours remembered him as a pious, benevolent ruler who patronized the Gallic Church. Theudebert died in late 547 or 548 after a hunting accident involving a wild bull and was succeeded by his son, Theudebald.

== Sources ==
Most of what is known about Theudebert comes from the Histories or History of the Franks written by Gregory of Tours in the second half of the sixth century. In addition, there is diplomatic correspondence composed at the Austrasian court (known as the Austrasian Letters) and the poems of Venantius Fortunatus. The works by Procopius and Agathias also provide an account of Theudebert's actions during his military campaigns in Italy.

== Early life and rise to power ==
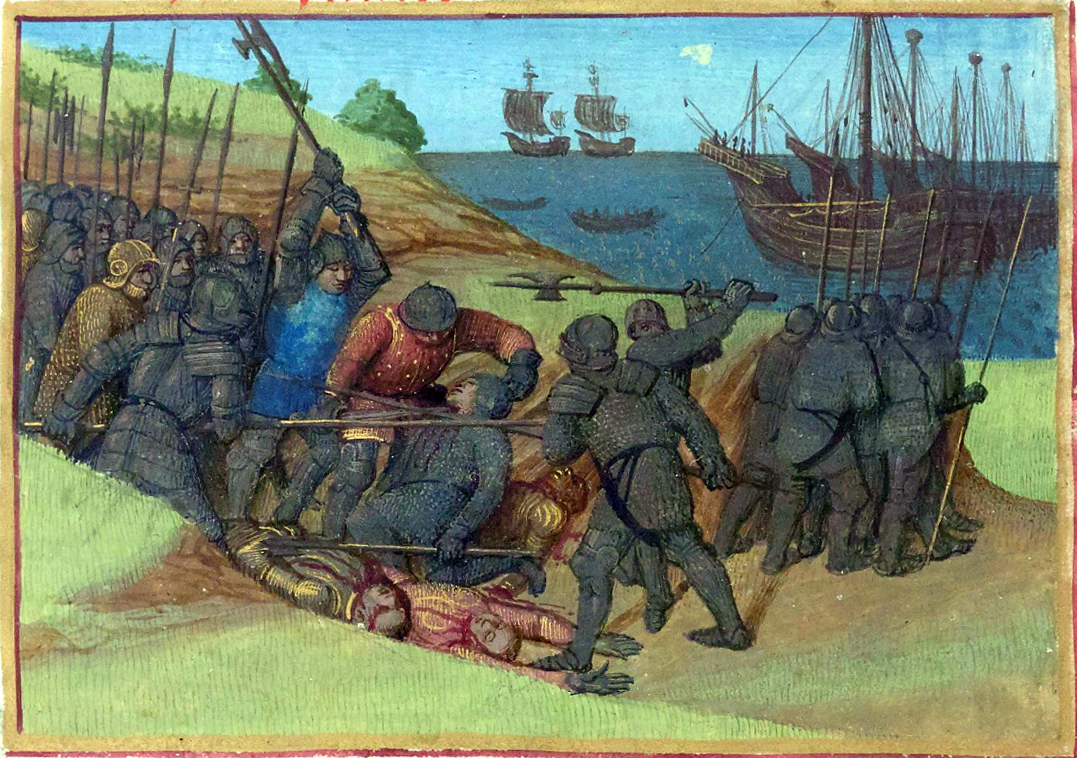
Anachronistic portrait depicting a battle between Franks and Danes in c. 516, from Jean Fouquet's illumination in the Grandes Chroniques de France, Tours, c. 1455–1460

Theudebert was the son of Theuderic I, a Merovingian king, and Suavegotho, a Burgundian princess. The date of his birth is estimated c. 500. During his father's reign, Theudebert accompanied his father in several military expeditions. Both men sought to extend the influence of the Frankish kingdom, east of the Rhine River, and south into Italy and Spain. During this period in 516, the Frankish attempted to control regions northeast of the Rhine triggered naval raids along the Channel Coast led by a Danish leader named Chrocilaic, identified with Hygelac of the Anglo-Saxon epic Beowulf. The expedition was repelled, and Chrocilaic was defeated in a naval battle and killed by Theudebert. During the course of a military campaign in Septimania region (south of France) against the Visigoths, Theudebert was summoned back home due to the death of his father by sickness.

Upon his father's death in 533, Theudebert had the support of the leudes, military retainers, whose assistance helped him claim the throne. However, he had to fight both his uncles Childebert and Chlothar I to inherit his father's kingdom. His military prowess persuaded Childebert to abandon the dispute and adopt Theudebert as his heir. Together they campaigned against Chlothar but sued for peace after their armies were hit by a storm. In 534, Theudebert along with his uncles conquered Burgundy and partitioned it among themselves.

== Gothic War ==
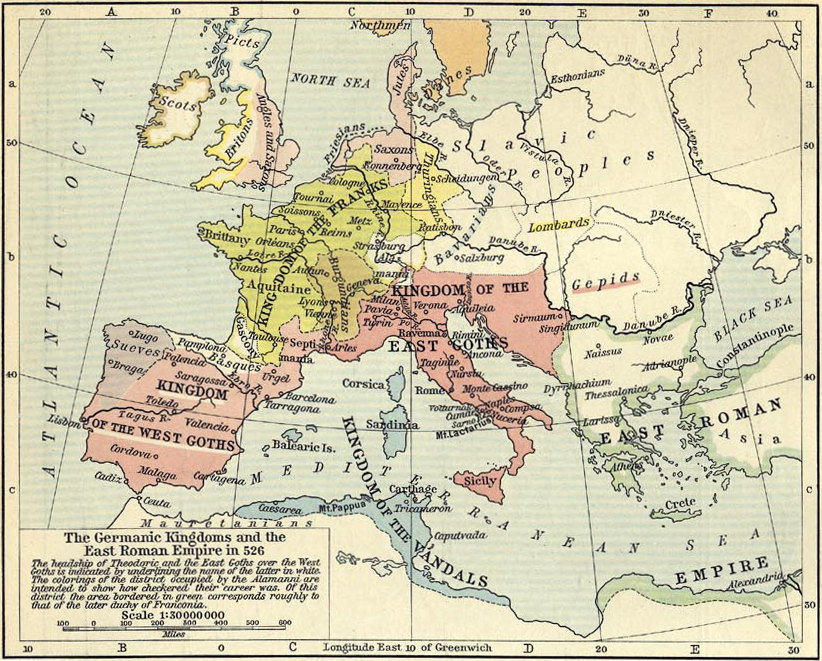
Map of the Byzantine (East Roman) Empire and the Germanic kingdoms of the western Mediterranean in 526

After relations between the Frankish kings had settled down, Theudebert found himself embroiled in the Gothic War, which began when the Byzantine Emperor Justinian I attempted to subdue the Ostrogoths in Italy. Justinian saw Theudebert as an ally in keeping the Ostrogoths divided between the Franks and the Byzantines. Justinian paid for his assistance, but Theudebert proved an untrustworthy ally. The Frankish armies saw the Italian conflict as an opportunity to exert their own claims to northern Italy.

Once the Gothic king Vitiges assumed power during the Gothic War in 536, he sought to secure a Frankish alliance. To win their support, he ceded Provence, part of the Raetia region, and 2,000 pounds of gold. In return, the three Frankish kings—Childebert, Chlothar, and Theudebert—agreed to send troops to assist Vitiges in Italy. However, to avoid violating the treaty they had concluded with Justinian in 538, they dispatched non-Frankish forces (10,000 Burgundians) by claiming that these troops were not under their authority. These forces assisted the Ostrogoths in the siege of Mediolanum. Once the city capitulated in March 539, its male population was massacred, and the women were given to the Burgundians in exchange for their assistance. Later in the same year, Theudebert invaded northern Italy with a 100,000-strong army, attacking both the Byzantines and the Ostrogoths. However, his expedition ended soon and retreated due to supply shortages and disease (diarrhea and dysentery), killing a third of the army.

Despite the retreat, Theudebert maintained control of the Alpine passes into Italy and closely followed the war's progress. During the Ostrogothic resurgence under King Totila, Theudebert seized the opportunity and captured the Cottian Alps, parts of the Liguria region, and the greater part of Venetia. Totila, prioritizing his conflict with Justinian, negotiated with Theudebert for the permanent grant of the captured lands to the Franks in the event of a victory. After this, Theudebert maintained neutrality to both sides.

== Relations with Byzantium ==
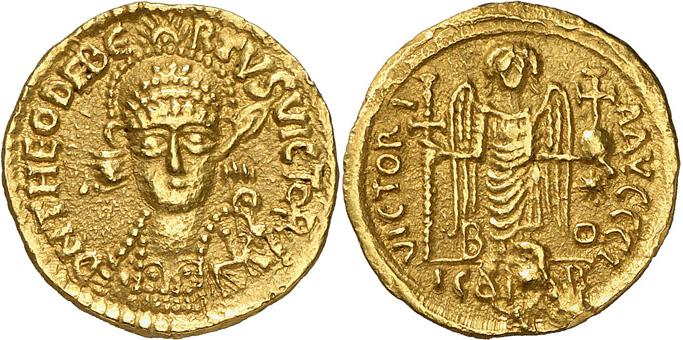
Gold solidus minted by Theudebert at Bonn around 540

The relation of Theudebert with Byzantium is considered complex. In his correspondence with Justinian, he describes him as his "father"; historian JB Bury argued that Justinian adopted him as part of securing an alliance against the Ostrogoths. Theudebert also describes to Justinian the extent of his hegemony, stretching from the North Sea to Danube River and Pannonia. Historian Ian Wood considers this an exaggeration, but notes it reflected the ambition of Theudebert to have a stature equivalent to that of a Roman emperor. (Note: A ruler over numerous people.) Theudebert's ambitions made the Byzantines to suspect a potential invasion in the Thrace region and an attack to Constantinople.

Justinian had used the titles of Francicus and Alamannicus, which modern historians presume angered Theudebert, as these titles portrayed the Franks as vassals to the Byzantine Empire. In 538, he broke imperial custom by minting gold coins containing his own image, effectively demonstrating independence. Up to this point, former Frankish kings had respected imperial convention and circulated gold coins with the image of the Byzantine emperor. Some of the new coins were encircled by an inscription reading "DN THEODEBTERVS VICTOR" ("Our Lord Theudebert the Victor"), which commemorates Theudebert's Italian campaign of 539. The choice of this form of celebration highlights Theudebert's reliance on traditional Roman traditions of royal self-representation and prestige.

== Relations with the Church ==
As well as being renowned for his military prowess, Theudebert was lauded by contemporaries for his patronage of the Gallic Church; he remitted all land-tax paid by the churches of Auvergne. Contemporary Gallo-Roman historian Gregory of Tours reserves special praise for him in this regard.

== Family and death ==
Early on, Theudebert's father arranged for his son to be betrothed to a Lombard princess, Wisigard, daughter of king of Lombards, Wacho. This was a first attempt to form a Lombard-Frankish alliance, which was likely concluded around 532–533. However, after becoming king, Theudebert delayed the marriage for seven years because in c. 533, he married Deuteria, a Gallo-Roman woman he had met while on campaign in southern Gaul. With Deuteria, he got a son, Theudebald, who later became the king's successor. In 539, under pressure from the Franks, he married Wisigarda. The marriage was strategically advantageous because he sought the support of both the Lombards and the Gepids for a potential campaign against Byzantium. Wisigarda died soon after her marriage to Theudebert. He later remarried, but the identity of his new wife is not recorded in surviving sources. He also had a daughter called Berthoara.

Theudebert died in the 14th year of his reign (at the end of 547 or the beginning of 548). He was killed by a wild bull during hunting. Theudebald succeeded him. In contrast to that experienced by many Merovingian kings, Theudebald's accession was peaceful since there was no other viable candidate to oppose it.

Theudebert I Merovingian dynasty Born: 500 Died: 548
Preceded by Theuderic I	King of Austrasia; 533–548	Succeeded by Theudebald
