= Grimoald I =

Grimoald I may refer to:

- Grimoald the Elder (died 657), mayor of the palace of Austrasia
- Grimoald, King of the Lombards (died 671), duke of Benevento as Grimoald I from 647 to 662
