= History of the Lombards =

Work by Paul the Deacon

- Historia Langobardorum; Historia gentis Langobardorum
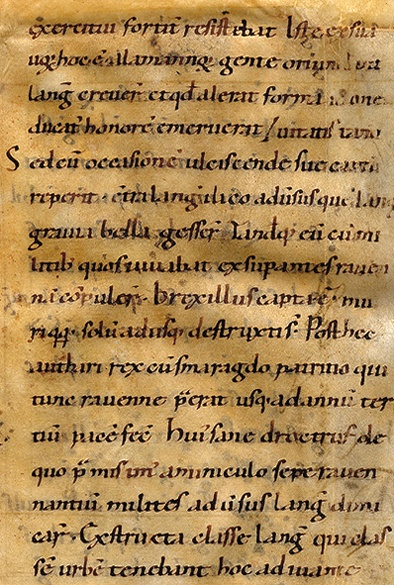
- Salzburg manuscript
- Author(s): Paul the Deacon
- Language: Latin
- Date: 787–796
- Provenance: Monte Cassino
- Manuscript(s): 115 extant manuscripts
- Principal manuscript(s): Codex Sangallensis 635
- First printed edition: 1514
- Genre: Ethnic history
- Subject: History of the Lombard people

The History of the Lombards or the History of the Langobards (Latin: Historia Langobardorum) is the chief work by Paul the Deacon, written in the late 8th century. This incomplete history in six books was written after 787 and at any rate no later than 796, maybe at Montecassino.

The history covers the story of the Lombards from their mythical origins to the death of King Liutprand in 743, and contains much information about the Eastern Roman empire, the Franks, and others. The story is told from the point of view of a Lombard patriot and is especially valuable for its treatment of the relations between the Franks and the Lombards. As his primary sources, Paul used the document called the Origo gentis Langobardorum, the Liber pontificalis, the lost history of Secundus of Trent, and the lost annals of Benevento; he also made free use of works by Bede, Gregory of Tours, and Isidore of Seville.

== Editions ==
According to a study made by Laura Pani in 2000, there are 115 surviving codices of Paul's history. A popular work in the Middle Ages, as indicated by the number of copies and their dissemination throughout Western Europe, more than twenty of these manuscripts predate the 11th century while another eighty or more were copied later.

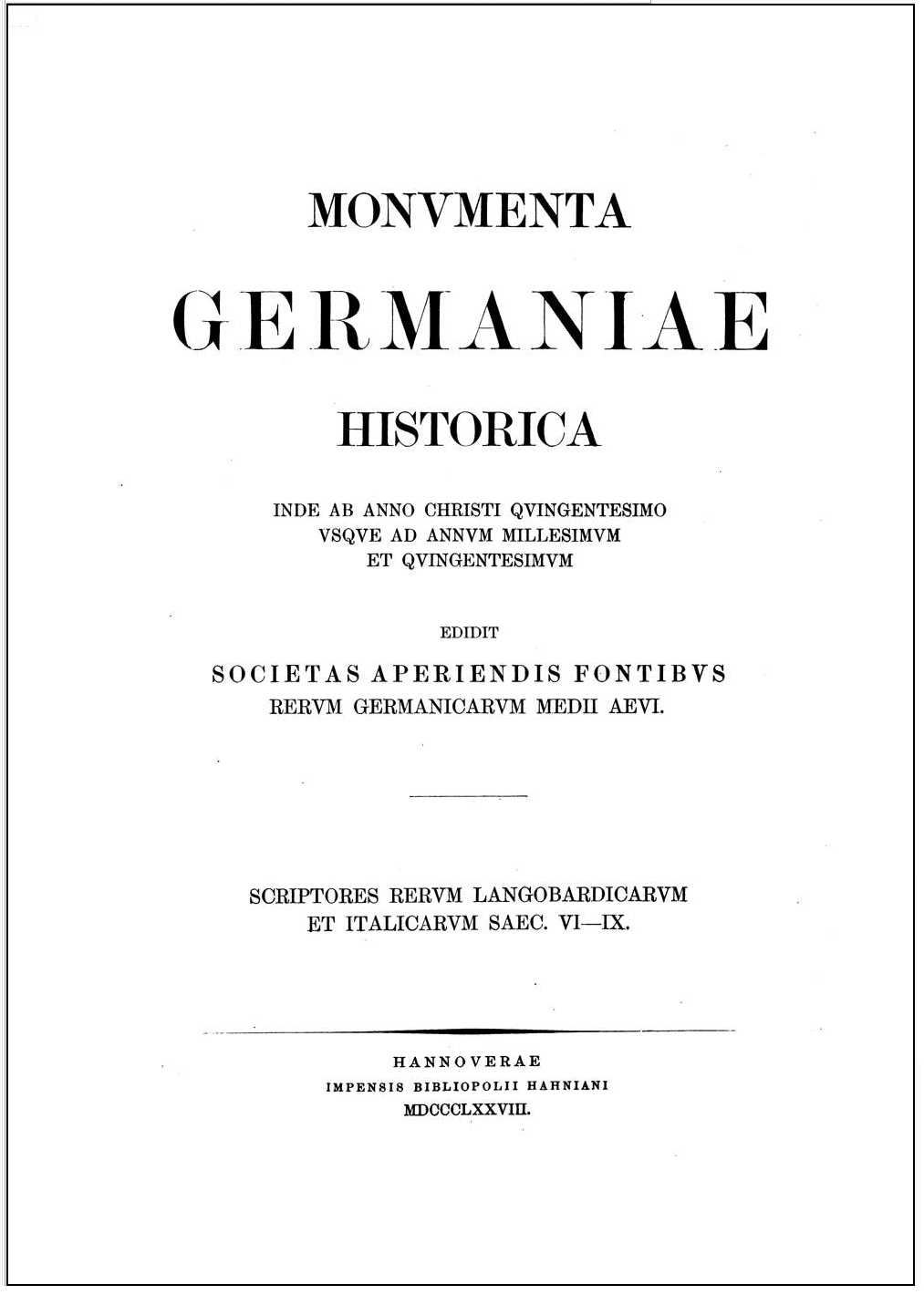
The 1878 edition of Bethmann and Waitz

The relations between these manuscripts were studied by Georg Waitz, who in 1876 identified 11 different families of the Historia Langobardorum. The oldest manuscript is the Palimpsest of Assisi, written in the uncial script towards the end of the 8th century, almost immediately after Paul's work was completed. This palimpsest is, however, far from complete, as it contains only parts of books II and V of Paul's history. The earliest complete manuscript is the Codex Sangallensis 635 written sometime between the 8th and the 10th centuries and designated by Waitz as F1. According to Waitz, F1's age makes it the most reliable of the Historia's codices, a view which has been challenged by Antonio Zanella and Dante Bianchi, both of whom hold that the F1 does not correctly reflect Paul's original.

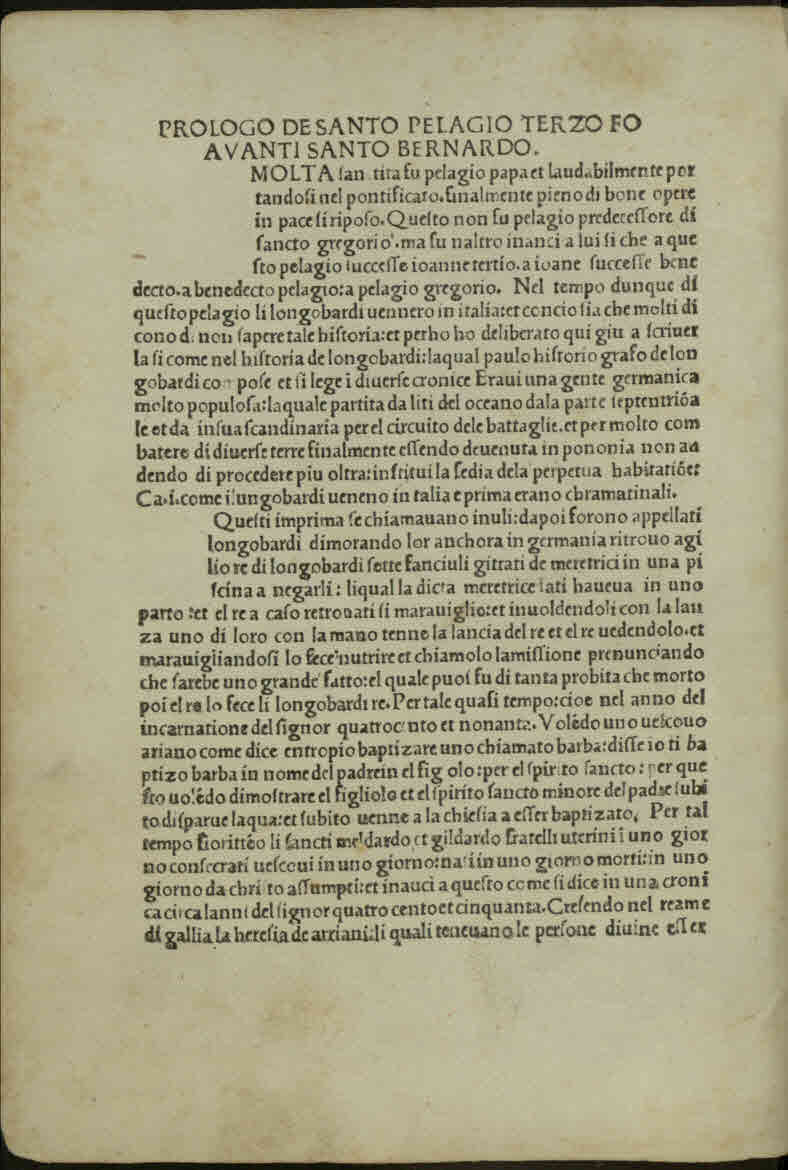
Historia Langobardorum, 1480

Paul's account was largely accepted by subsequent writers, was often continued, and was first printed in Paris in 1514. Among the printed editions of the Latin text, the most authoritative is that edited by Ludwig Konrad Bethmann and Georg Waitz and published in the Monumenta Germaniae Historica. Scriptores rerum langobardicarum et Italicarum (Hanover, 1878).

== Translations ==
It has been translated into English, German, French, Polish, Spanish, Swedish, Italian, Aragonese, Czech, Slovenian and Croatian, the English translation being by W.D. Foulke (Philadelphia, 1906), the German by O. Abel and R. Jacobi (Leipzig, 1878), the Polish by Ignacy Lewandowski (1995, Warsaw), Henryk Pietruszczak, (2002, Zgorzelec), the Spanish by P. Herrera (Cádiz, 2006), and the Swedish by Helge Weimarck (Stockholm, 1971).

Several versions of the English translation are available (see below in the section Further reading).

=== Into Italian ===
- L. Domenichi, Paulo Diacono della Chiesa d'Aquileia della Origine e Fatti de' Re Longobardi (Venice, 1548)
- A. Viviani, Dell'origine e de' fatti de' Longobardi, 2 vols. (Udine, 1826‑28)
- G. S. Uberti, De' fatti de' Longobardi (Cividale, 1899), reprinted in the Biblioteca Popolare Sonzogno (Milan, 1915)
- M. Felisatti, Storia dei Longobardi (Milan, 1967)
- F. Roncoroni, Storia dei Longobardi (Milan, 1971)
- E. Bartolini, Historia Langobardorum with Latin text and translation by A. Giacomini (Udine, n.d.)
- A. Zanella, Storia dei Longobardi (Milan, 1991)
- L. Capo (ed.), Storia dei Longobardi (Milan, 1992)
