= Walthari =

King of the Lombards, AD 539 to 546

Walthari (also Waltheri, Latin: Waltharius) son of Wacho from his third wife Silinga, was a king of the Lombards from 539 to 546. He was an infant king, and rulership of the kingdom was administered by Audoin. Audoin probably killed Waltari before he reached manhood, in order to gain the throne for himself around 546, and led the Lombards into Pannonia. Procopius mentions he died of disease. He was the last of the Lething Dynasty.

== Notes ==
Regnal titles
Preceded by Wacho	King of the Lombards; 539–546	Succeeded by Audoin
