= Wacho =

6th-century king of the Lombards

Wacho (also Waccho; probably from Waldchis) was king of the Lombards before they entered Italy from an unknown date (perhaps c. 510) until his death in 539. His father was Unichis. Wacho usurped the throne by assassinating (or having assassinated) his uncle, King Tato (again, probably around 510). Tato's son Ildchis fought with him and fled to the Gepids where he died. Wacho had good relations with the Franks.

Wacho married three times. His first marriage was to Raicunda, daughter of Bisinus, King of the Thuringi. His second marriage was to Austrigusa, a Gepid possibly named after her maternal descent from Ostrogothic rulers. Austrigusa was the mother of two daughters: Wisigarda (who married Theudebert I of Austrasia) and Waldrada (who married firstly Theudebald of Austrasia, secondly Chlothar I, King of the Franks, and thirdly Garibald I of Bavaria). Wacho's third marriage was to Silinga, a Heruli, mother of Waltari. According to some historians (Josef Poulík), he was buried on Žuráň hill, however, modern historians are not certain about it.

== See also ==
- Family tree of the Lombard kings, Wacho was an ancestor of many later Lombard dynasties

== Notes ==
Regnal titles
Preceded by Tato	King of the Lombards; 510–539	Succeeded by Walthari
