= Authari =

King of the Lombards from 584 to 590

- King of the Lombards
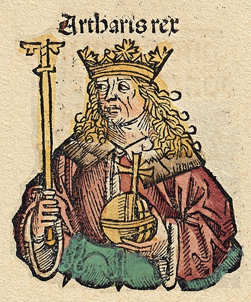
- Woodcut vignette of Authari in the 1493 Nuremberg Chronicle
- Reign: 584 – 590
- Predecessor: Rule of the Dukes
- Successor: Agilulf
- Born: c. 550
- Died: 5 September 590; Pavia, Neustria; Lombard Kingdom
- Spouse: Theodelinda
- Father: Cleph
- Religion: Arianism

Authari (c. 550 – 5 September 590) was king of the Lombards from 584 to his death. He was considered the first Lombard king to have adopted some level of Romanitas (Roman-ness) and introduced policies that led to drastic changes, particularly in the treatment of the Romans and greater tolerance for the Christian faith.

== Background ==
The Kingdom of the Lombards was an early medieval state established by the Lombards, a Germanic people, on the Italian Peninsula in the latter part of the 6th century. The Kingdom was traditionally governed as an elective monarchy; the king was elected by the very highest-ranking aristocrats, the dukes.

Authari was the son of Cleph, King of the Lombards, and duke of an unknown city. When Cleph was murdered in 574, the Lombard nobility refused to appoint a successor, resulting in a decade-long interregnum known as the Rule of the Dukes, represented by leading regional oligarchs who held sway.

In 574 and 575 the Lombards invaded Provence, then part of the kingdom of Burgundy of the Merovingian Guntram, but Burgundian counteroffensives pushed them across the Alps and into northern Italy, where they occupied the Susa and Aosta Valleys. Meanwhile, the Merovingian kingdom allied itself with the Byzantines and counter-attacked; the combined Frankish and Byzantine armies marched through the Tyrol valley of the Etsch into Meran and up to the gates of Trent. While successful at first, the Lombard Duke of Trent, Euin, was able to repulse their assaults and crush the invaders near Salurn. Not only was Euin able to score victory, but he also strengthened the Lombards' regional ties by marrying the daughter of Garibald I, duke of Bavaria in 578. (Note: The Bavarian duke was incidentally betrothed to Walderada, a Lombard, which further secured their reciprocal links.)

== Election as King of the Lombards ==
Under pressure from the Franks, who—under Byzantine employ—invaded Italy again in 584, the Lombards elected Duke Authari as their king, who defeated the intruders. When the next Frankish imposition occurred in 588, it proved a fiasco for the invading forces since both Authari's Lombards and Garibald's Bavarian forces were allied and defeated them accordingly. Additional imperial tactics of paying one barbarian group to fight another came into play when the Alemannic mercenary commander Droctulf was persuaded to abandon the Lombards and join the imperial forces in assailing his former confederates. However, Authari overcame Droctulf's forces—Authari was later celebrated for retaking Classis from the Lombards—and Droctulf retreated to Brescia and Ravenna.

Then in 590, the Frankish envoy Grippo led another combined imperial and Frankish army against the Lombards. Their intention was to drive them from Italy, but after capturing Modena, Mantua, and Altino, they had to stop at the Lombard capital at Pavia upon learning that the Frankish leader Cedinus had signed a ten-month truce with King Authari, which forced them to return to Gaul. As a result of this and other debacles across the empire, Constantinople and the reestablished imperial western empire at Ravenna were required to come to terms with the permanent presence of the Lombards in Italy.

== Religion and marriage ==
Despite his conversion to Arian Christianity (Note: Paul the Deacon expressly suppressed this fact in his text. This must have been deliberate since Pope Gregory the Great had even condemned Authari for his Arian heresy.) and his permissive tolerance of the Catholic religion—unlike his predecessors—Authari still forbade the sons of Lombards from being baptized as Catholics, since he viewed it as an "instrument of the Empire" that would sap "the warrior vitality" from them.

Authari married Theodelinda, daughter of the Bavarian duke Garibald I, on 15 May 589 at Verona. A detailed account of the courtship by the eighth-century historian Paul the Deacon revealed that the marriage was also a political alliance designed to provide additional sanction to Authari's royal position. In addition, Theodelinda was also chosen due to the long-standing ties between the Lombards and the Bavarians as well as their mutual hostility toward the Franks. She also claimed descent from the ancient Lombard royal line.

== Legacy ==
When Authari died in Pavia in 590, possibly by poison, he was succeeded as king by Agilulf, duke of Turin, on the advice, sought by the dukes, of Theodelinda, who married the new king. (Note: During the year Agilulf assumed the Lombard throne, Pope Pelagius II had died and Gregory I (the Great) became pontiff. The deceased king's wife was so esteemed that she not only wed his successor but allegedly helped choose him as king.) He was buried in the Church of Santi Gervasio e Protasio in Pavia.

In the wake of Authari's death, Theodelinda increased her cooperation with Pope Gregory in what has been deemed a religious "high-point in Lombard history" by historian Shami Ghosh.

Throughout the 7th century, Authari's successors continued to strengthen the Lombard monarchy and bolster their ethnic identity, while at the same time expanding the Lombard control of Italy. These successors (like Agilulf) not only extended the reach of the Lombards but also instituted important changes in the religion and governmental structure of the Lombards.

== Bibliography ==
- Bauer, Susan Wise (2010). The History of the Medieval World: From the Conversion of Constantine to the First Crusade. New York: W. W. Norton & Company. ISBN 978-0-39305-975-5.
- Christie, Neil (1998). The Lombards: The Ancient Longobards. Malden, MA: Blackwell. ISBN 0-631-18238-1.
- Frassetto, Michael (2003). Encyclopedia of Barbarian Europe: Society in Transformation. Santa Barbara, CA: ABC-CLIO. ISBN 978-1-57607-263-9.
- Frassetto, Michael (2013). The Early Medieval World: From the Fall of Rome to the Time of Charlemagne [2 Volumes]. Santa Barbara, CA: ABC-CLIO, LLC. ISBN 978-1-59884-995-0.
- Ghosh, Shami (2015). Writing the Barbarian Past: Studies in Early Medieval Historical Narrative. Leiden: Brill. ISBN 978-9-00430-522-9.
- Hartmann, L.M. (1913). "Italy under the Lombards". In H.M. Gwatkin; J.P. Whitney (eds.). The Cambridge Medieval History. Vol. III [The Rise of the Saracens and the Foundations of the Western Empire]. New York: Macmillan & Co.
- Herrin, Judith (2020). Ravenna: Capital of Empire, Crucible of Europe. Princeton and Oxford: Princeton University Press. ISBN 978-0-69115-343-8.
- Majocchi, Piero (2010). "Le sepolture regie nell'alto medioevo (secoli VI-X)". Reti Medievali Rivista. 9: 12–14. ISSN 1593-2214.
- Paul the Deacon (2011). Edward Peters (ed.). History of the Lombards. Philadelphia: University of Pennsylvania Press. ISBN 978-0812210798.
- Wolfram, Herwig (1997). The Roman Empire and its Germanic Peoples. Berkeley and Los Angeles: University of California Press. ISBN 0-520-08511-6.

=== Further reading ===
- Jarnut, Jörg (1992). Geschichte der Langobarden. Stuttgart.

Regnal titles
Vacant Rule of the Dukes Title last held by Cleph	King of the Lombards; 584–590	Succeeded by Agilulf
