= Early Middle Ages =

Period of European history

- c. 5th century – 10th century
Late antiquity	High Middle Ages
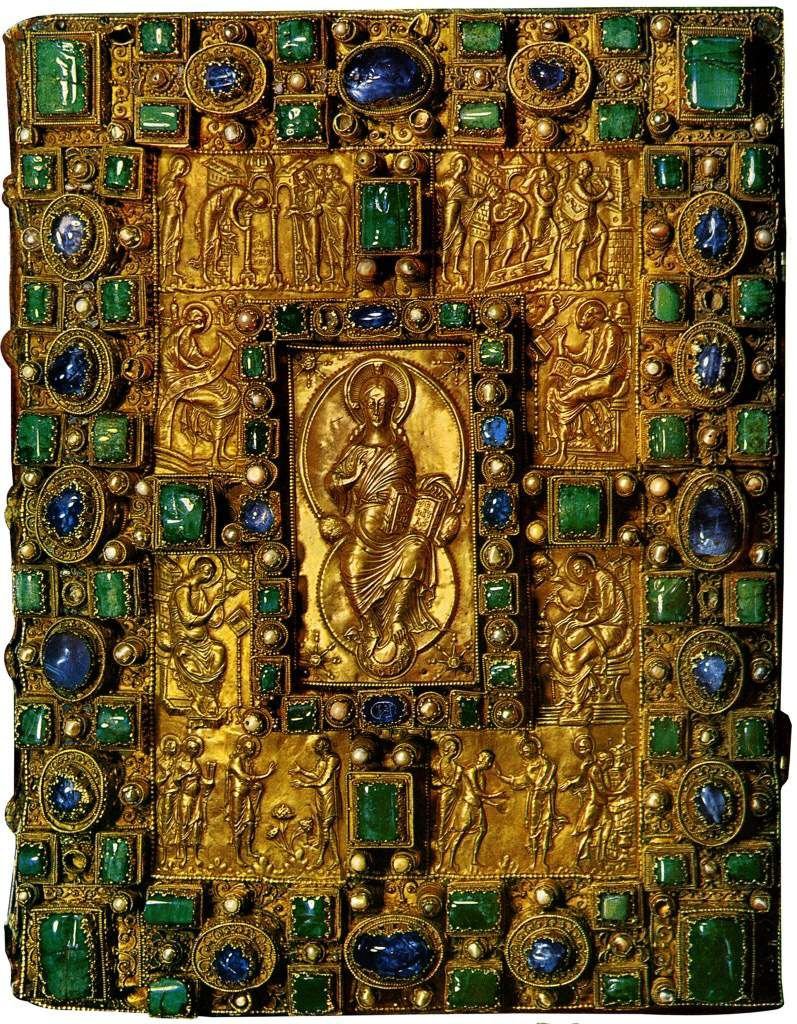
- The jewelled cover of the Codex Aureus of St. Emmeram, c. 870, a Carolingian Gospel Book
- Location: Europe
- Key events: Fall of the Western Roman Empire; Migration Period; Muslim conquest of the Iberian Peninsula; Coronation of Charlemagne; Viking expansion Hungarian invasions Holy Roman Empire

The Early Middle Ages (or early medieval period), sometimes controversially referred to as the Dark Ages, is typically regarded by historians as lasting from the late 5th to the 10th century. (Note: For more detail on the various starting and ending dates used by historians, see Middle Ages § Terminology and periodisation.) They marked the start of the Middle Ages of European history, following the decline of the Western Roman Empire, and preceding the High Middle Ages (c. 11th to 14th centuries). The alternative term late antiquity, for the early part of the period, emphasizes elements of continuity with the Roman Empire, while Early Middle Ages is used to emphasize developments characteristic of the earlier medieval period.

The period saw a continuation of trends evident since late classical antiquity, including population decline, especially in urban centres, a decline of trade and increased migration. In the 19th century the Early Middle Ages were often labelled the Dark Ages, a characterization based on the relative scarcity of literary and cultural output from this time. The term is rarely used by academics today. The Eastern Roman Empire, or Byzantine Empire, survived, though in the 7th century the Rashidun Caliphate and the Umayyad Caliphate conquered the southern part of the Roman territory.

Many of the listed trends reversed later in the period. In 800, the title of Emperor was revived in Western Europe with Charlemagne, whose Carolingian Empire greatly affected later European social structure, arts, culture, and history. Europe experienced a return to systematic agriculture in the form of the feudal system, which adopted such innovations as three-field planting and the heavy plough. Barbarian migration stabilized in much of Europe, although the Viking expansion greatly affected Northern Europe.

== History ==
=== Collapse of Rome ===
Starting in the 2nd century, various indicators of Roman civilization began to decline, including urbanization, seaborne commerce, and population. Archaeologists have identified only 40 percent as many Mediterranean shipwrecks from the 3rd century as from the first. Estimates of the population of the Roman Empire during the period from 150 to 400 suggest a fall from 65 million to 50 million, a decline of more than 20 percent. Some scholars have connected this de-population to the Dark Ages Cold Period (300–700), when a decrease in global temperatures impaired agricultural yields.

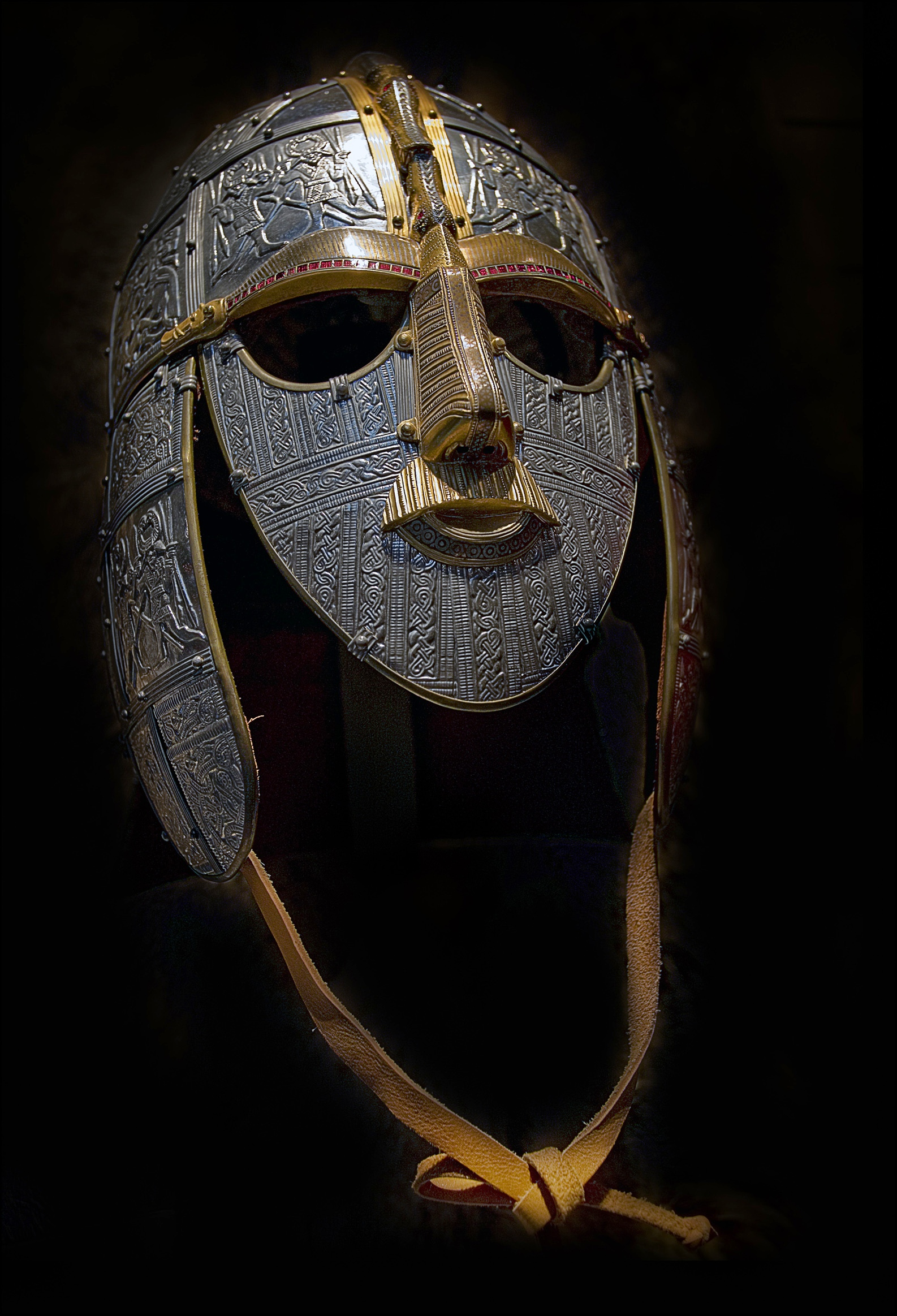
Replica of the Sutton Hoo helmet; the original was buried with an Anglo-Saxon leader, probably King Rædwald of East Anglia, c. 620–625 CE.

Early in the 3rd century, Germanic peoples migrated south from Scandinavia and reached the Black Sea, creating formidable confederations which opposed the local Sarmatians. In Dacia (present-day Romania) and on the steppes north of the Black Sea the Goths, a Germanic people, established at least two kingdoms: Therving and Greuthung.

The arrival of the Huns in 372–375 ended the history of these kingdoms. The Huns, a confederation of central Asian tribes, founded an empire. They had mastered the difficult art of shooting composite recurve bows from horseback. The Goths sought refuge in Roman territory (376), agreeing to enter the Empire as unarmed settlers. However, many bribed the Danube border-guards into allowing them to bring their weapons.

The discipline and organization of a Roman legion made it a superb fighting unit. The Romans preferred infantry to cavalry because infantry could be trained to retain the formation in combat, while cavalry tended to scatter when faced with opposition. While a barbarian army could be raised and inspired by the promise of plunder, the legions required a central government and taxation to pay for salaries, constant training, equipment, and food. The decline in agricultural and economic activity reduced the empire's taxable income and thus its ability to maintain a professional army to defend itself from external threats.

The Barbarians' Invasions

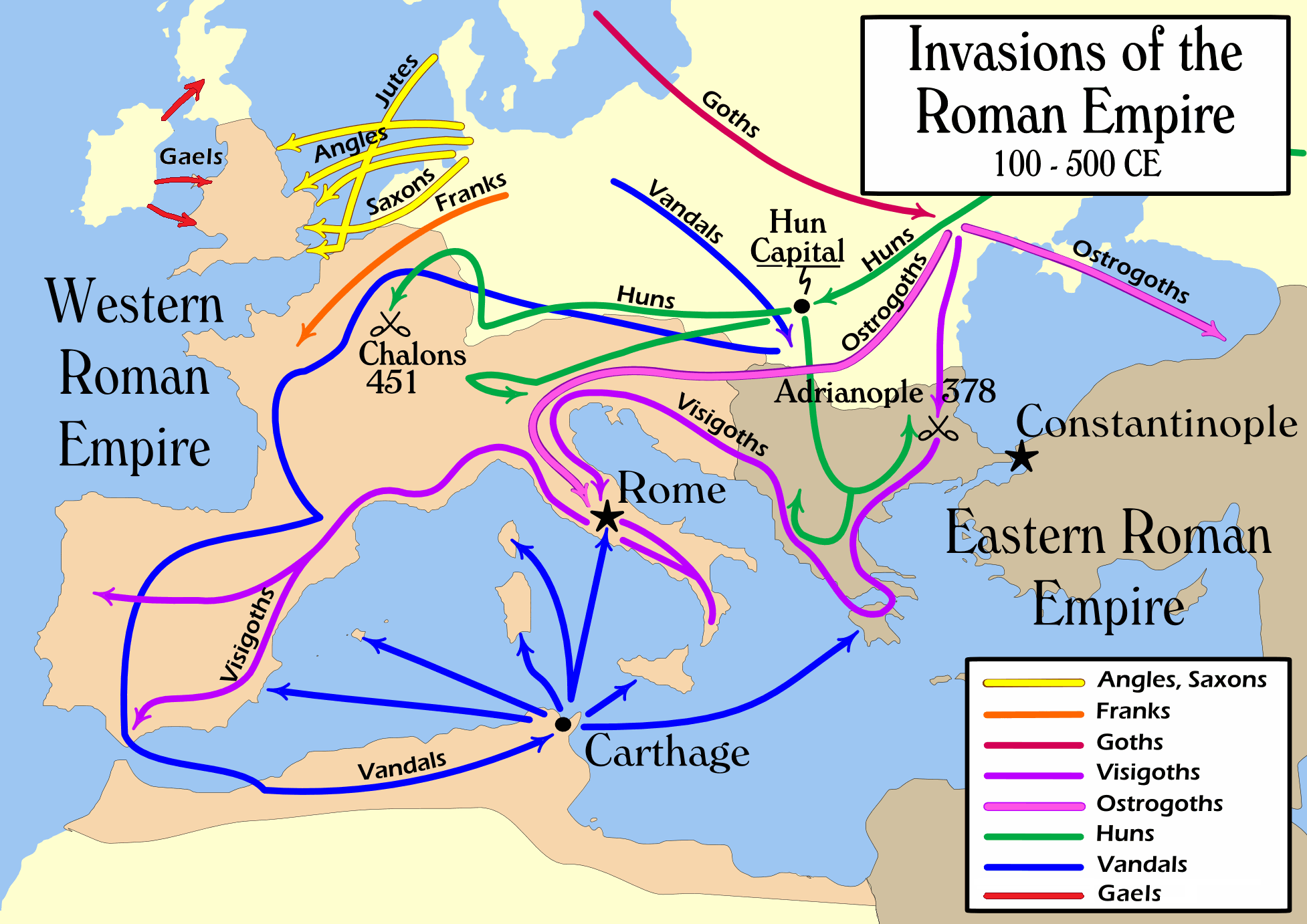
The destruction of the Gothic kingdoms by the Huns in 372–375 triggered the Germanic migrations of the 5th century. The Visigoths captured and looted the city of Rome in 410; the Vandals followed suit in 455

Germanic tribes

- Angles, Saxons
- Franks (100,000)
- Goths
- Visigoths (200,000)
- Ostrogoths (100,000)
- Huns
- Vandals (80,000)

Roman Empire

- Western Empire
- Eastern Empire

In the Gothic War (376–382), the Goths revolted and confronted the main Roman army in the Battle of Adrianople (378). By this time, the distinction in the Roman army between Roman regulars and barbarian auxiliaries had broken down, and the Roman army was composed mainly of barbarians and soldiers recruited for a single campaign. The general decline in discipline also led to the use of smaller shields and lighter weaponry. Not wanting to share the glory, Eastern Emperor Valens ordered an attack on the Therving infantry under Fritigern without waiting for Western Emperor Gratian, who was on the way with reinforcements. While the Romans were fully engaged, the Greuthung cavalry arrived. Only one-third of the Roman army managed to escape. This represented the most shattering defeat that the Romans had suffered since the Battle of Cannae (216 BC), according to the Roman military writer Ammianus Marcellinus. The core army of the Eastern Roman Empire was destroyed, Valens was killed, and the Goths were freed to lay waste to the Balkans, including the armories along the Danube. As Edward Gibbon comments, "The Romans, who so coolly and so concisely mention the acts of justice which were exercised by the legions, reserve their compassion and their eloquence for their own sufferings, when the provinces were invaded and desolated by the arms of the successful Barbarians."

The empire lacked the resources, and perhaps the will, to reconstruct the professional mobile army destroyed at Adrianople, so it had to rely on barbarian armies to fight for it. The Eastern Roman Empire succeeded in buying off the Goths with tribute. The Western Roman Empire proved less fortunate. Stilicho, the western empire's half-Vandal military commander, stripped the Rhine frontier of troops to fend off invasions of Italy by the Visigoths in 402–03 and by other Goths in 406–07.

Fleeing before the advance of the Huns, the Vandals, Suebi, and Alans launched an attack across the frozen Rhine near Mainz; on 31 December 406, the frontier gave way and these tribes surged into Roman Gaul. There soon followed the Burgundians and bands of the Alamanni. In the fit of anti-barbarian hysteria which followed, the Western Roman Emperor Honorius had Stilicho summarily beheaded (408). Stilicho submitted his neck, "with a firmness not unworthy of the last of the Roman generals", wrote Gibbon. Honorius was left with only worthless courtiers to advise him. In 410, the Visigoths led by Alaric I captured the city of Rome and for three days fire and slaughter ensued as bodies filled the streets, palaces were stripped of their valuables, and the invaders interrogated and tortured those citizens thought to have hidden wealth. As newly converted Christians, the Goths respected church property, but those who found sanctuary in the Vatican and in other churches were the fortunate few.

=== Migration Period ===
Migration Period

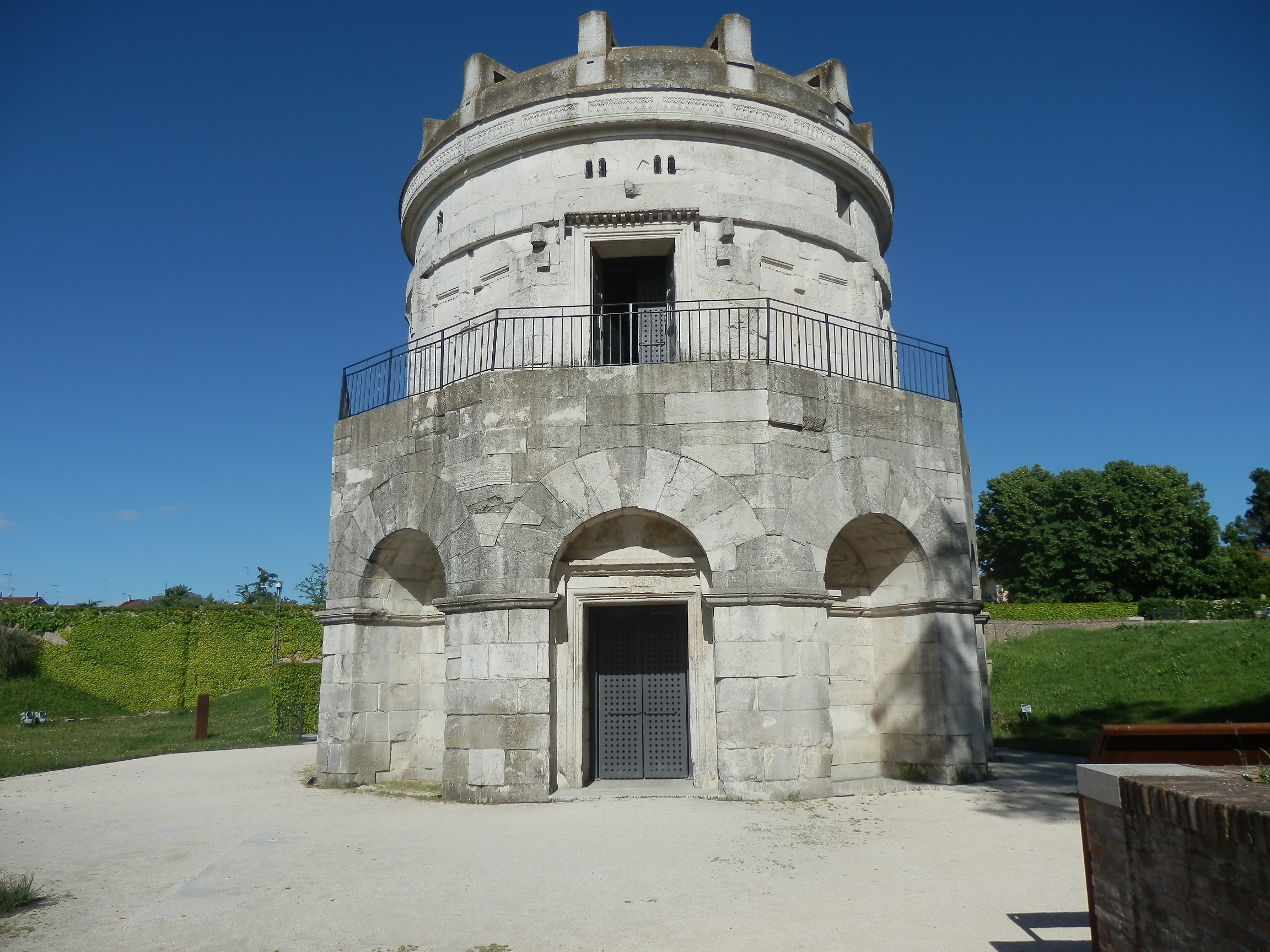
The Mausoleum of Theodoric in Ravenna is the only extant example of Ostrogothic architecture.

Around 500, the Visigoths ruled large parts of what is now France, Spain, Andorra and Portugal.

The Goths and Vandals were only the first of many bands of peoples that flooded Western Europe in the absence of administrative governance. Some lived only for war and pillage and disdained Roman ways. Other peoples had been in prolonged contact with the Roman civilization, and were, to a certain degree, romanized. "A poor Roman plays the Goth, a rich Goth the Roman," said King Theoderic of the Ostrogoths. The subjects of the Roman empire were a mixture of Roman Christian, Arian Christian, Nestorian Christian, and pagan. The Germanic peoples knew little of cities, money, or writing, and were mostly pagan, though they were increasingly converting to Arianism, a non-trinitarian form of Christianity that considers God the Son to have been created by, and thus inferior to, God the Father, rather than the two being co-eternal, which is the position of Chalcedonian Christianity. Arianism found some adherents in the Roman Empire before being eclipsed by the Chalcedonian position and then suppressed as heretical.

During the migrations, or Völkerwanderung (wandering of the peoples), the earlier settled populations were sometimes left intact though usually partially or entirely displaced. Roman culture north of the Po River was almost entirely displaced by the migrations. Whereas the peoples of France, Italy, Spain and Portugal continued to speak the dialects of Vulgar Latin that today constitute the Romance languages, the language of the smaller Roman-era population of what is now England disappeared with barely a trace in the territories settled by the Anglo-Saxons, although the Brittanic kingdoms of the west remained Brythonic speakers. The new peoples greatly altered established society, including law, culture, religion, and patterns of property ownership.

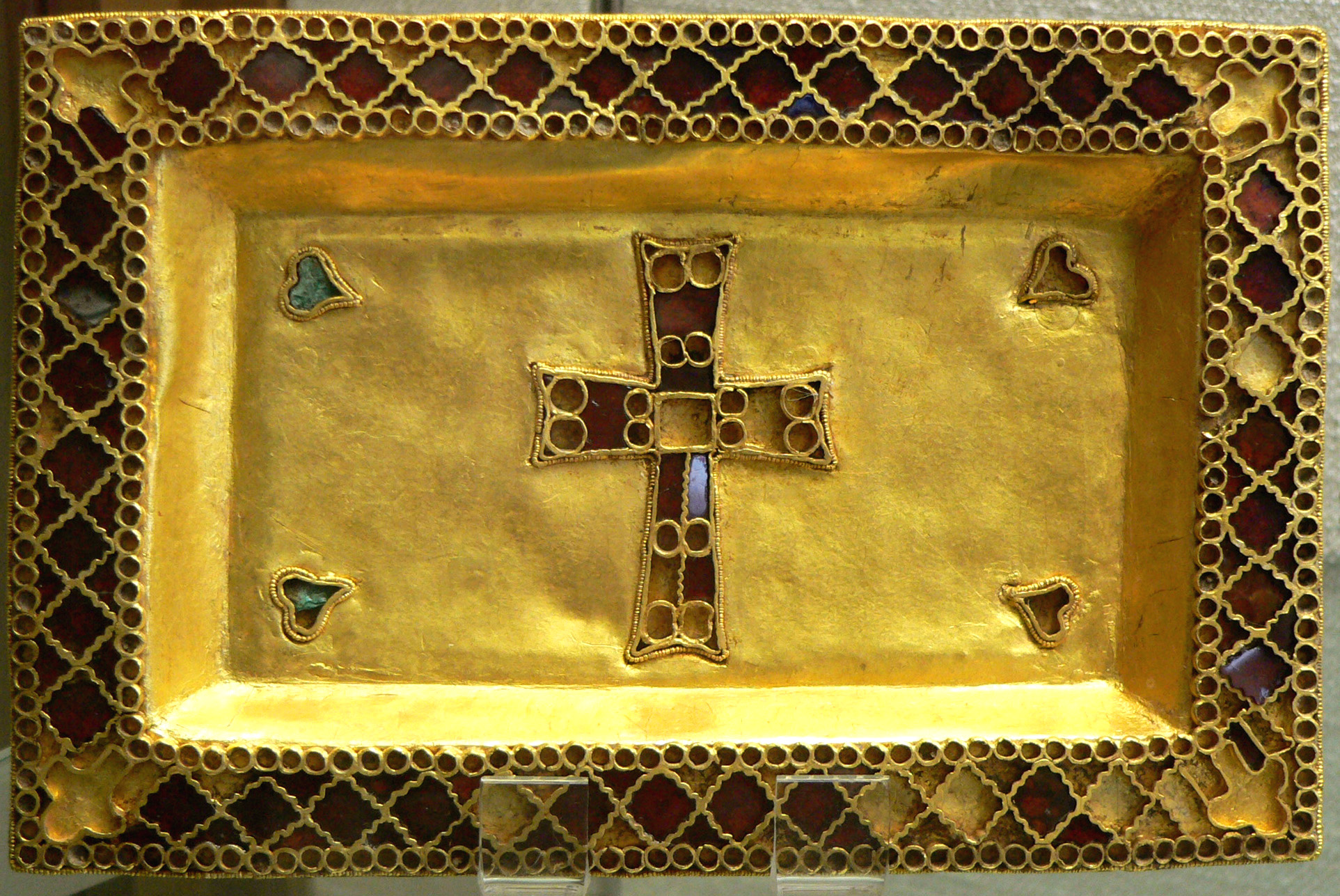
A paten from the Treasure of Gourdon, found at Gourdon, Saône-et-Loire, France.

The pax Romana had provided safe conditions for trade and manufacture, and a unified cultural and educational milieu of far-ranging connections. As this was lost, it was replaced by the rule of local potentates, sometimes members of the established Romanized ruling elite, sometimes new lords of alien culture. In Aquitania, Gallia Narbonensis, southern Italy and Sicily, Baetica or southern Spain, and the Iberian Mediterranean coast, Roman culture lasted until the 6th or 7th centuries.

The gradual breakdown and transformation of economic and social linkages and infrastructure resulted in increasingly localized outlooks. This breakdown was often fast and dramatic as it became unsafe to travel or carry goods over any distance; there was a consequent collapse in trade and manufacture for export. Major industries that depended on trade, such as large-scale pottery manufacture, vanished almost overnight in places like Britain. Tintagel in Cornwall, as well as several other centres, managed to obtain supplies of Mediterranean luxury goods well into the 6th century, but then lost their trading links. Administrative, educational and military infrastructure quickly vanished, and the loss of the established cursus honorum led to the collapse of the schools and to a rise of illiteracy even among the leadership. The careers of Cassiodorus (died c. 585) at the beginning of this period and of Alcuin of York (died 804) at its close were founded alike on their valued literacy. For the formerly Roman area, there was another 20 per cent decline in population between 400 and 600, or a one-third decline for 150–600. In the 8th century, the volume of trade reached its lowest level. The very small number of shipwrecks found that dated from the 8th century supports this (which represents less than 2 per cent of the number of shipwrecks dated from the 1st century). There was also reforestation and a retreat of agriculture centred around 500.

The Romans had practiced two-field agriculture, with a crop grown in one field and the other left fallow and ploughed under to eliminate weeds. Systematic agriculture largely disappeared and yields declined. It is estimated that the Plague of Justinian which began in 541 and recurred periodically for 150 years thereafter killed as many as 100 million people across the world. Some historians such as Josiah C. Russell (1958) have suggested a total European population loss of 50 to 60 per cent between 541 and 700. After the year 750, major epidemic diseases did not appear again in Europe until the Black Death of the 14th century. The disease smallpox, which was eradicated in the late 20th century, did not definitively enter Western Europe until about 581 when Bishop Gregory of Tours provided an eyewitness account that describes the characteristic findings of smallpox. Waves of epidemics wiped out large rural populations. Most of the details about the epidemics are lost, probably due to the scarcity of surviving written records.

For almost a thousand years, Rome was the most politically important, richest and largest city in Europe. Around 100 AD, it had a population of about 450,000, and declined to a mere 20,000 during the Early Middle Ages, reducing the sprawling city to groups of inhabited buildings interspersed among large areas of ruins and vegetation.

=== Eastern Roman Empire ===
Byzantine Empire

Byzantine Empire under the Justinian dynasty
- Under Emperor Justinian (r. 527–565), the Byzantines were able to reestablish Roman rule in Italy and most of North Africa.

- Justinian's conquests
- Eastern Empire

The death of Theodosius I in 395 was followed by the division of the empire between his two sons. The Western Roman Empire disintegrated into a mosaic of warring Germanic kingdoms in the 5th century, effectively making the Eastern Roman Empire in Constantinople the Greek-speaking successor to the classical Roman Empire. The inhabitants continued to regard themselves as Romans, or Romaioi, until the fall of Constantinople to the Ottoman Empire in 1453. Despite this, to distinguish it from its predominantly Latin-speaking predecessor, historians began referring to the empire as "Byzantine", after the original name of Constantinople, Byzantium.

The Eastern Roman or "Byzantine" Empire aimed to retain control of the trade routes between Europe and the Orient, which made the Empire the richest polity in medieval Europe. Making use of their sophisticated warfare and superior diplomacy, the Byzantines managed to fend off assaults by the migrating barbarians. Their dreams of subduing the Western potentates briefly materialized during the reign of Justinian I in 527–565. Not only did Justinian restore some western territories to the Roman Empire, including Rome and the Italian peninsula itself, but he also codified Roman law (with his codification remaining in force in many areas of Europe until the 19th century) and commissioned the building of the largest and most architecturally advanced edifice of the Early Middle Ages, the Hagia Sophia. However, his reign also saw the outbreak of a bubonic plague pandemic, now known retroactively as the Plague of Justinian. The Emperor himself was afflicted, and within the span of less than a year, an estimated 200,000 Constantinopolites—two out of every five city residents—had died of the disease.

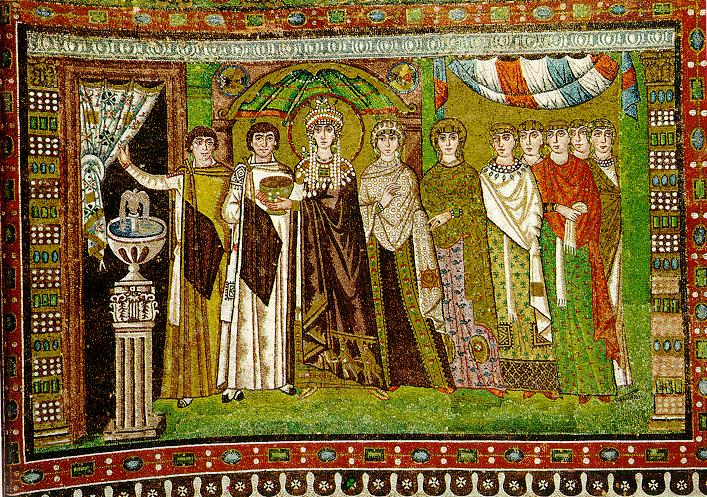
Theodora, Justinian's wife, and her retinue

Justinian's successors Maurice and Heraclius confronted invasions by the Avar and Slavic tribes. After the devastations by the Slavs and the Avars, large areas of the Balkans became depopulated. In 626 Constantinople, by far the largest city of early medieval Europe, withstood a combined siege by Avars and Persians. Within several decades, Heraclius completed a holy war against the Persians, taking their capital and having a Sassanid monarch assassinated. Yet Heraclius lived to see his spectacular success undone by the Muslim conquests of Syria, three Palaestina provinces, Egypt, and North Africa which was considerably facilitated by religious disunity and the proliferation of heretical movements (notably Monophysitism and Nestorianism) in the areas converted to Islam.

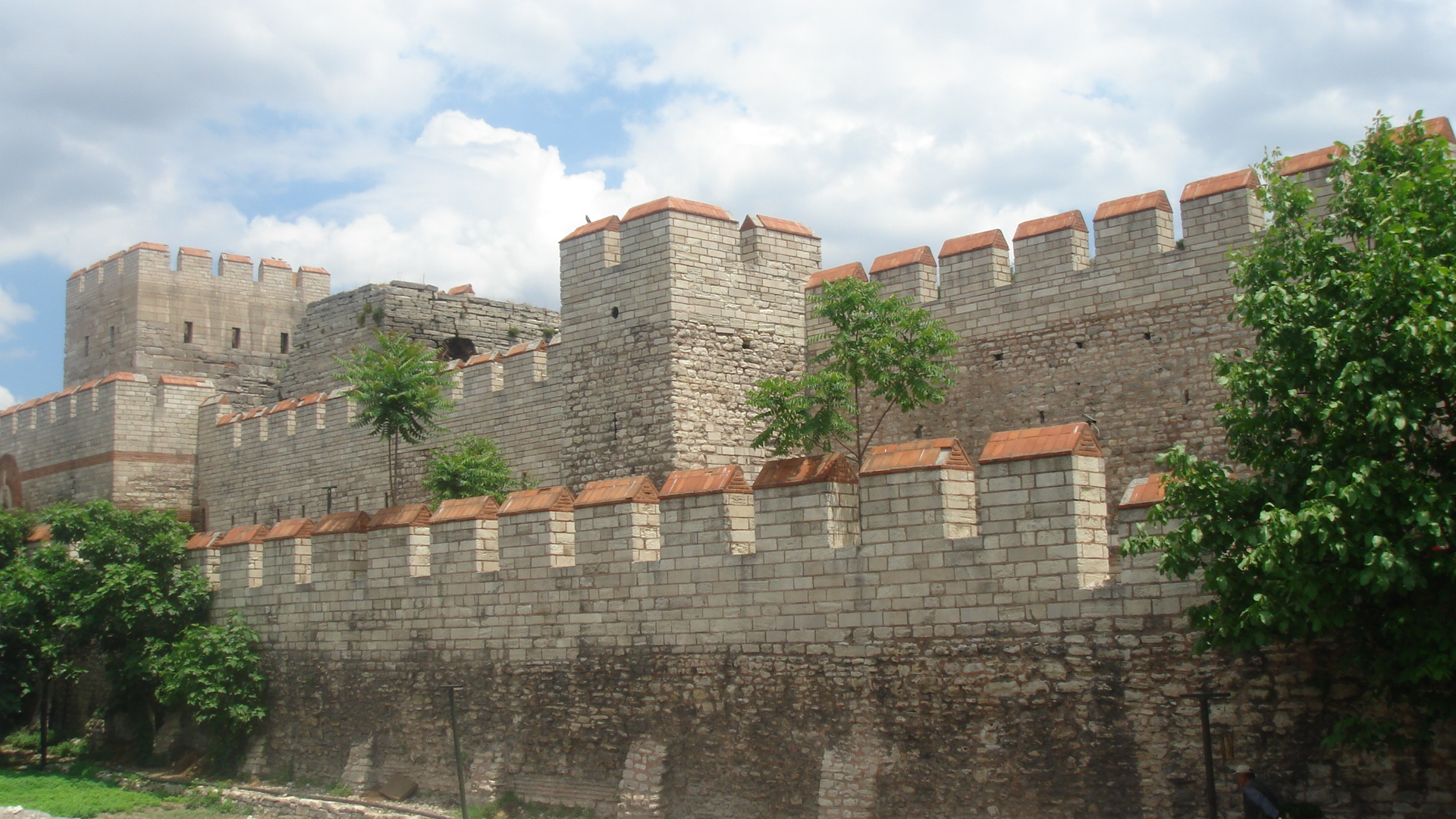
Restored Walls of Constantinople

Although Heraclius's successors managed to salvage Constantinople from two Arab sieges (in 674–77 and 717), the empire of the 8th and early 9th century was rocked by the great Iconoclastic Controversy, punctuated by dynastic struggles between various factions at court. The Bulgar and Slavic tribes profited from these disorders and invaded Illyria, Thrace and even Greece. After the decisive victory at Ongala in 680 the armies of the Bulgars and Slavs advanced to the south of the Balkan mountains, defeating again the Byzantines who were then forced to sign a humiliating peace treaty which acknowledged the establishment of the First Bulgarian Empire on the borders of the Empire.

To counter these threats a new system of administration was introduced. The regional civil and military administration were combined in the hands of a general, or strategos. A theme, which formerly denoted a subdivision of the Byzantine army, came to refer to a region governed by a strategos. The reform led to the emergence of great landed families which controlled the regional military and often pressed their claims to the throne (see Bardas Phocas and Bardas Sklerus for characteristic examples).

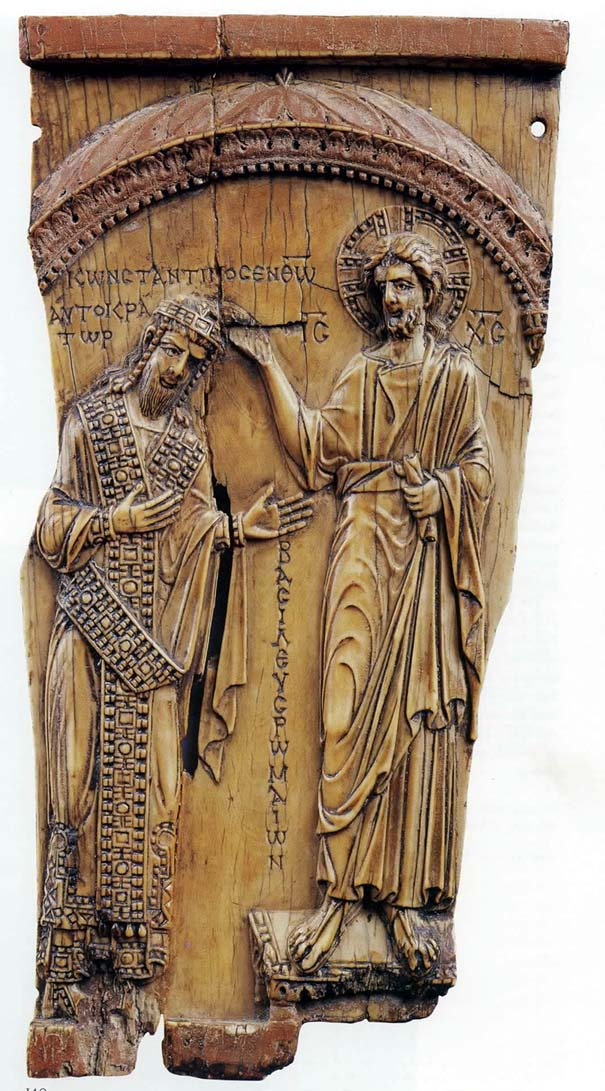
Christ crowning Constantine VII ivory plaque, ca. 945

By the early 8th century, notwithstanding the shrinking territory of the empire, Constantinople remained the largest and the wealthiest city west of China, comparable only to Sassanid Ctesiphon, and later Abbasid Baghdad. The population of the imperial capital fluctuated between 300,000 and 400,000 as the emperors undertook measures to restrain its growth. The only other large Christian cities were Rome (50,000) and Thessalonica (30,000). Even before the 8th century was out, the Farmer's Law signalled the resurrection of agricultural technologies in the Roman Empire. As the 2006 Encyclopædia Britannica noted, "the technological base of Byzantine society was more advanced than that of contemporary western Europe: iron tools could be found in the villages; water mills dotted the landscape; and field-sown beans provided a diet rich in protein".

The ascension of the Macedonian dynasty in 867 marked the end of the period of political and religious turmoil and introduced a new golden age of the empire. While the talented generals such as Nicephorus Phocas expanded the frontiers, the Macedonian emperors (such as Leo the Wise and Constantine VII) presided over the cultural flowering in Constantinople, known as the Macedonian Renaissance. The enlightened Macedonian rulers scorned the rulers of Western Europe as illiterate barbarians and maintained a nominal claim to rule over the West. Although this fiction had been exploded with the coronation of Charlemagne in Rome (800), the Byzantine rulers did not treat their Western counterparts as equals. Generally, they had little interest in political and economic developments in the barbarian (from their point of view) West.

Against this economic background the culture and the imperial traditions of the Eastern Roman Empire attracted its northern neighbours—Slavs, Bulgars, and Khazars—to Constantinople, in search of either pillage or enlightenment. The movement of the Germanic tribes to the south triggered the great migration of the Slavs, who occupied the vacated territories. In the 7th century, they moved westward to the Elbe, southward to the Danube and eastward to the Dnieper. By the 9th century, the Slavs had expanded into sparsely inhabited territories to the south and east from these natural frontiers, peacefully assimilating the indigenous Illyrian and Finnic populations.

=== Rise of Islam ===
632–750

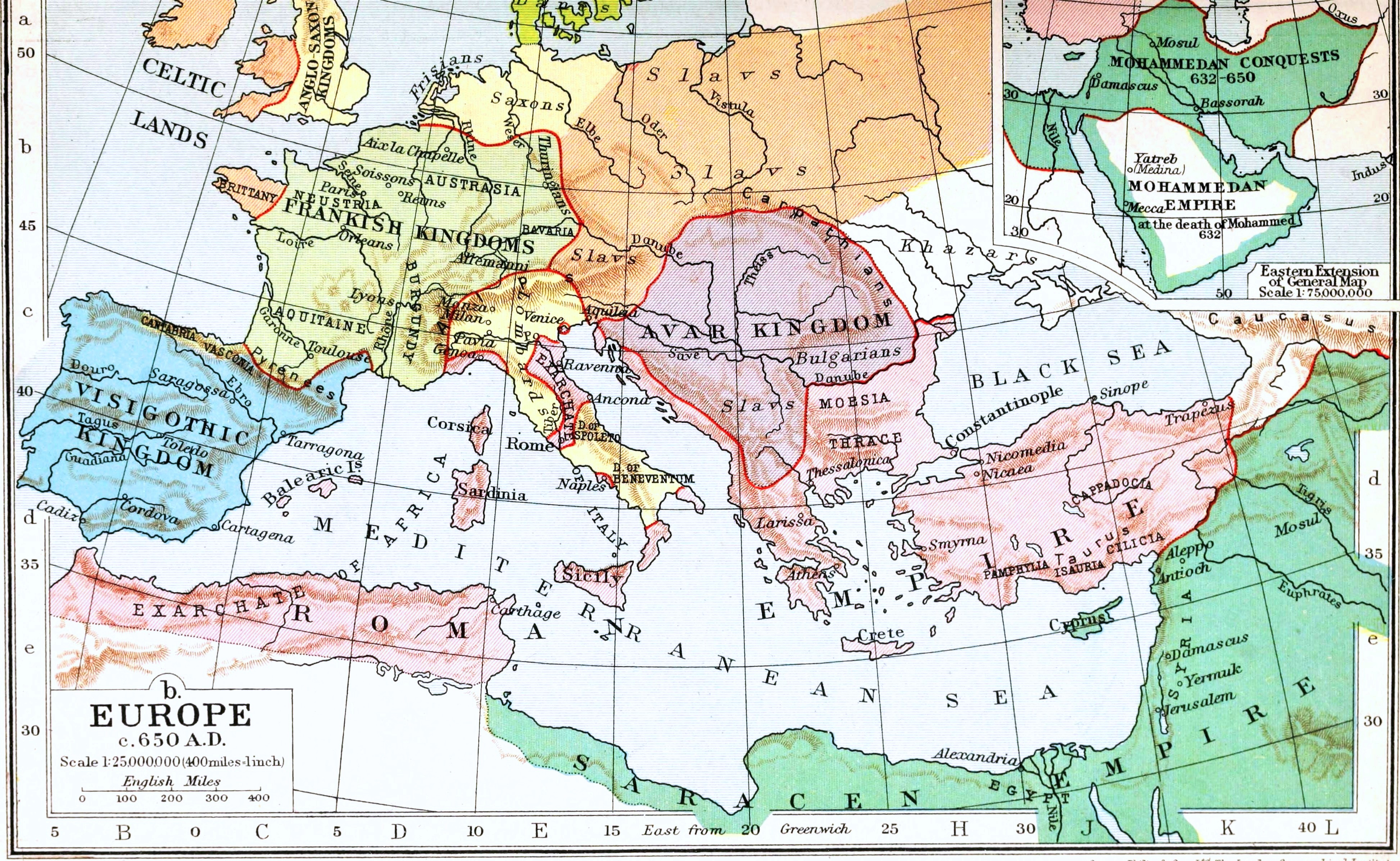
Europe around 650

From the 7th century, Byzantine history was greatly affected by the rise of Islam and the Caliphates. Muslim Arabs first invaded historically Roman territory under Abū Bakr, first Caliph of the Rashidun Caliphate, who entered Roman Syria and Roman Mesopotamia. The Byzantines and neighbouring Persian Sasanids had been severely weakened by a long succession of Byzantine–Sasanian wars, especially the climactic Byzantine–Sasanian War of 602–628. Under Umar, the second Caliph, the Muslims decisively conquered Syria and Mesopotamia, as well as Roman Palestine, Roman Egypt, parts of Asia Minor and Roman North Africa, while they entirely toppled the Sasanids. In the mid 7th century, following the Muslim conquest of Persia, Islam penetrated into the Caucasus region, of which parts would later permanently become part of Russia. This expansion of Islam continued under Umar's successors and then the Umayyad Caliphate, which conquered the rest of Mediterranean North Africa and most of the Iberian Peninsula. Over the next centuries Muslim forces were able to take further European territory, including Cyprus, Malta, Septimania, Crete, and Sicily and parts of southern Italy.

The Muslim conquest of Hispania began when the Moors (mostly Berbers and some Arabs) invaded the Christian Visigothic Kingdom in the year 711, under their Berber leader Tariq ibn Ziyad. They landed at Gibraltar on 30 April and worked their way northward. Tariq's forces were joined the next year by those of his superior, Musa ibn Nusair. During the eight-year campaign most of the Iberian Peninsula was brought under Muslim rule—except for small areas in the north-northwest (Asturias) and largely Basque regions in the Pyrenees. This territory, under the Arab name Al-Andalus, became part of the expanding Umayyad empire.

The unsuccessful second siege of Constantinople (717) weakened the Umayyad dynasty and reduced their prestige. After their success in overrunning Iberia, the conquerors moved northeast across the Pyrenees. They were defeated by the Frankish leader Charles Martel at the Battle of Poitiers in 732. The Umayyads were overthrown in 750 by the Abbāsids and most of the Umayyad clan were massacred.

A surviving Umayyad prince, Abd-ar-rahman I, escaped to Spain and founded a new Umayyad dynasty in the Emirate of Cordoba in 756. Charles Martel's son Pippin the Short retook Narbonne, and his grandson Charlemagne established the Marca Hispanica across the Pyrenees in part of what today is Catalonia, reconquering Girona in 785 and Barcelona in 801. The Umayyads in Hispania proclaimed themselves caliphs in 929.

=== Birth of the Latin West ===
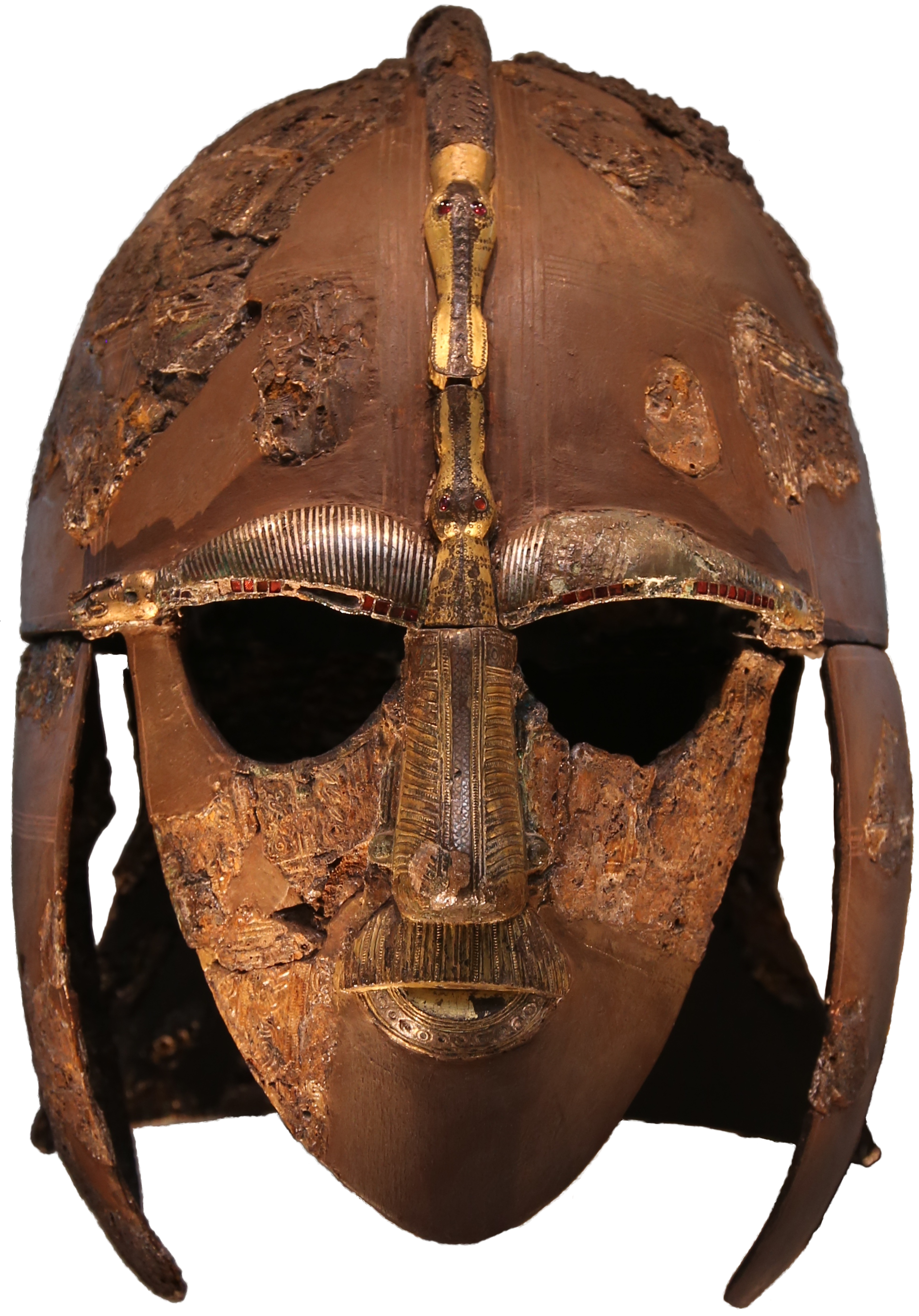
The Sutton Hoo helmet, an Anglo-Saxon helmet from the early 7th century

Though much of Roman civilization north of the Po River had been wiped out in the years after the end of the Western Roman Empire, between the 5th and 8th centuries, new political and social infrastructure began to develop. Much of this was initially Germanic and pagan. Arian Christian missionaries had been spreading Arian Christianity throughout northern Europe, though by 700 the religion of northern Europeans was largely a mix of Germanic paganism, Christianized paganism, and Arian Christianity. Chalcedonian Christianity had barely started to spread in northern Europe by this time. Through the practice of simony, local princes typically auctioned off ecclesiastical offices, causing priests and bishops to function as though they were yet another noble under the patronage of the prince. In contrast, a network of monasteries had sprung up as monks sought separation from the world. These monasteries remained independent from local princes, and as such constituted the "church" for most northern Europeans during this time. Being independent from local princes, they increasingly stood out as centres of learning, of scholarship, and as religious centres where individuals could receive spiritual or monetary assistance.

The interaction between the culture of the newcomers, their warband loyalties, the remnants of classical culture, and Christian influences, produced a new model for society, based in part on feudal obligations. The centralized administrative systems of the Romans did not withstand the changes, and the institutional support for chattel slavery largely disappeared. The Visigoths and Lombards abandoned Arianism for Nicene Christianity and the formerly pagan Anglo-Saxons, Thuringians, and Bavarians converted to Christianity between the late 6th and mid-8th centuries but the Umayyad conquest of the Visigothic Kingdom in Iberia (711–720s) — the most organized and legally sophisticated Germanic Latin Christian kingdom of the era — left the Kingdom of the Franks ("Francia"), Kingdom of the Lombards (on the Italian Peninsula) and petty Anglo-Saxon kingdoms (in the British Isles) as the only significant Latin Christian realms. Within these three realms, however, the cultural influence of the Latin Church — including its prohibitions on cousin marriage, polygamy, and remarriage within kin groups — ran longest and cut deepest, gradually eroding the extended clans and kinship groups that had long organized Western European society.

==== Italy ====
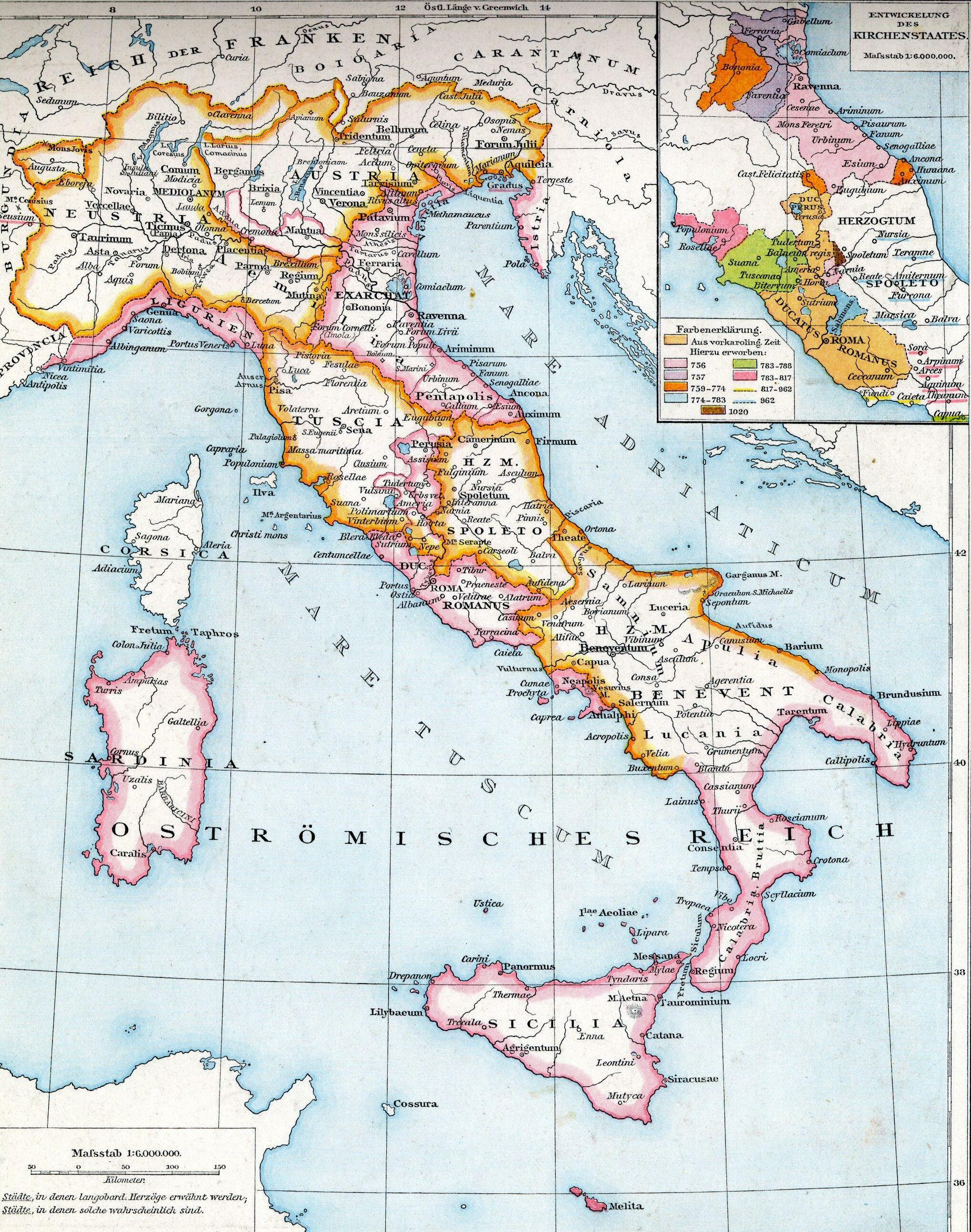
The Lombard possessions in Italy: The Lombard Kingdom (Neustria, Austria and Tuscia) and the Lombard Duchies of Spoleto and Benevento

The Lombards, who first entered Italy in 568 under Alboin, carved out a state in the north, with its capital at Pavia. At first, they were unable to conquer the Exarchate of Ravenna, the Ducatus Romanus, and Calabria and Apulia. The next two hundred years were occupied in trying to conquer these territories from the Byzantine Empire.

The Lombard state was relatively Romanized, at least when compared to the Germanic kingdoms in northern Europe. It was highly decentralized at first, with the territorial dukes having practical sovereignty in their duchies, especially in the southern duchies of Spoleto and Benevento. For a decade following the death of Cleph in 575, the Lombards did not even elect a king; this period is called the Rule of the Dukes. The first written legal code was composed in poor Latin in 643: the Edictum Rothari. It was primarily the codification of the oral legal tradition of the people.

The Lombard state was well-organized and stabilized by the end of the long reign of Liutprand (717–744), but its collapse was sudden. Unsupported by the dukes, King Desiderius was defeated and forced to surrender his kingdom to Charlemagne in 774. The Lombard kingdom ended and a period of Frankish rule was initiated. The Frankish king Pepin the Short had, by the Donation of Pepin, given the pope the "Papal States" and the territory north of that swath of papally-governed land was ruled primarily by Lombard and Frankish vassals of the Holy Roman Emperor until the rise of the city-states in the 11th and 12th centuries.

From the 650s onward, the Mediterranean became a battleground between Arab and Byzantine naval forces, with both sides launching raids and counterraids against islands and coastal settlements and engaging in a naval arms race. Sicily was attacked by Arab ships in 652 and Cyprus was conquered by 654. In the latter part of the conflict, the Republic of Venice emerged as an important ally of the Byzantines.

In the south, a period of chaos began. The Duchy of Benevento maintained its sovereignty in the face of the pretensions of both the Western and Eastern Empires. In the 9th century, the Muslims conquered Sicily. The cities on the Tyrrhenian Sea departed from Byzantine allegiance. Various states owing various nominal allegiances fought constantly over territory until events came to a head in the early 11th century with the coming of the Normans, who conquered the whole of the south by the end of the century.

==== Britain ====
Roman Britain was in a state of political and economic collapse at the time of the Roman departure c. 400. A series of settlements (traditionally referred to as an invasion) by Germanic peoples began in the early fifth century, and by the sixth century the island would consist of many small kingdoms engaged in ongoing warfare with each other. The Germanic kingdoms are now collectively referred to as Anglo-Saxons. Christianity began to take hold among the Anglo-Saxons in the sixth century, with 597 given as the traditional date for its large-scale adoption.

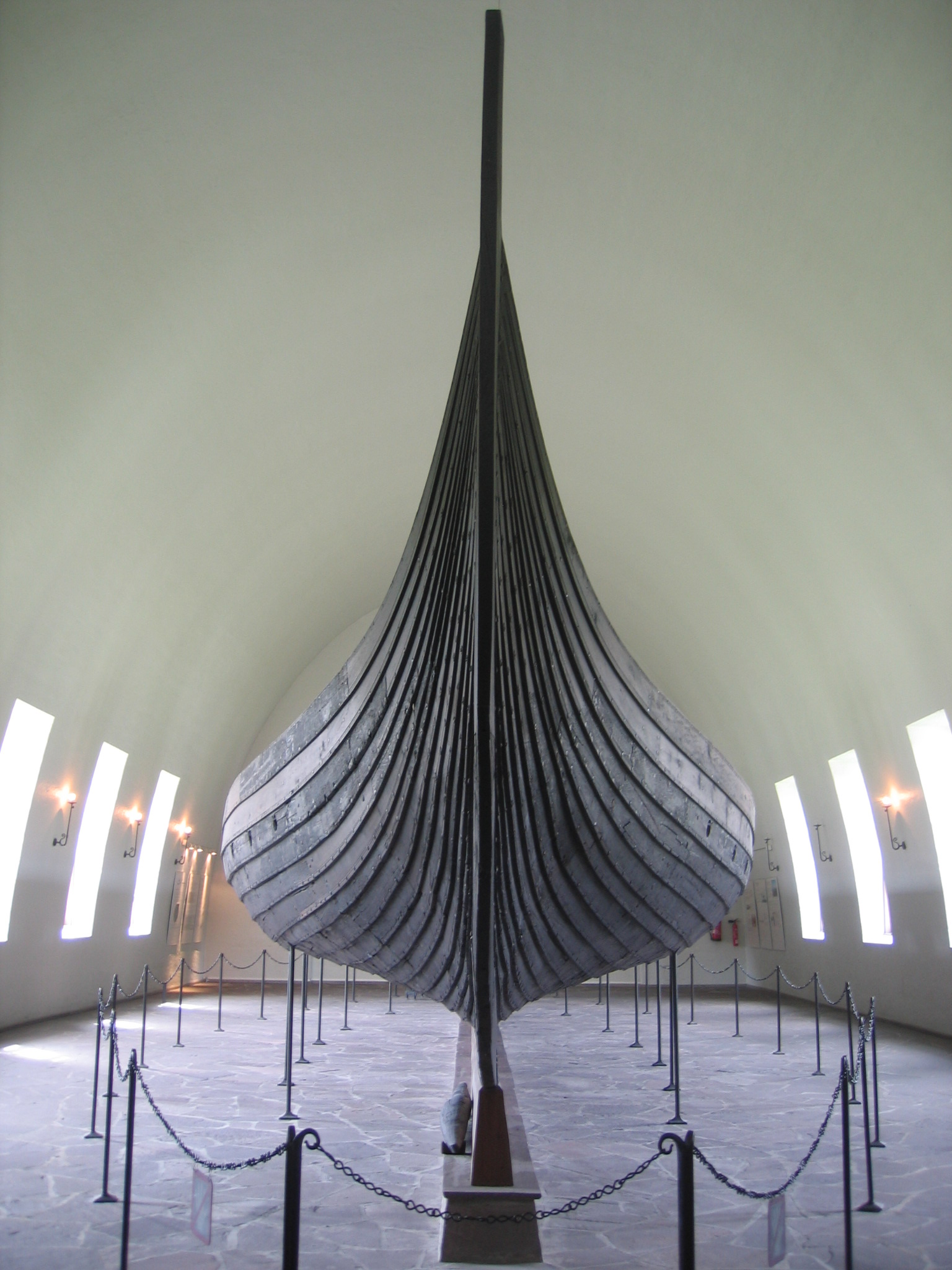
The Gokstad ship, a 9th-century Viking longship, excavated in 1882. Viking Ship Museum, Oslo, Norway

Western Britain (Wales), eastern and northern Scotland (Pictland) and the Scottish highlands and isles continued their separate evolution. The Irish descended and Irish-influenced people of western Scotland were Christian from the fifth century onward, the Picts adopted Christianity in the sixth century under the influence of Columba, and the Welsh had been Christian since the Roman era.

The Kingdom of Northumbria was the pre-eminent power c. 600–700, absorbing several weaker Anglo-Saxon and Brythonic kingdoms, while Mercia held a similar status c. 700–800. Wessex would absorb all of the kingdoms in the south, both Anglo-Saxon and Briton. In Wales consolidation of power would not begin until the ninth century under the descendants of Merfyn Frych of Gwynedd, establishing a hierarchy that would last until the Norman invasion of Wales in 1081.

The first Viking raids on Britain began before 800, increasing in scope and destructiveness over time. In 865 a large, well-organized Danish Viking army (called the Great Heathen Army) attempted a conquest, breaking or diminishing Anglo-Saxon power everywhere but in Wessex. Under the leadership of Alfred the Great and his descendants, Wessex would at first survive, then coexist with, and eventually conquer the Danes. It would then establish the Kingdom of England and rule until the establishment of an Anglo-Danish kingdom under Cnut, and then again until the Norman Invasion of 1066.

Viking raids and invasion were no less dramatic for the north. Their defeat of the Picts in 839 led to a lasting Norse heritage in northernmost Scotland, and it led to the combination of the Picts and Gaels under the House of Alpin, which became the Kingdom of Alba, the predecessor of the Kingdom of Scotland. The Vikings combined with the Gaels of the Hebrides to become the Gall-Gaidel and establish the Kingdom of the Isles.

==== Frankish Empire ====
Europe in 814. Charlemagne's empire included most of modern France, Germany, the Low Countries, Austria and northern Italy.

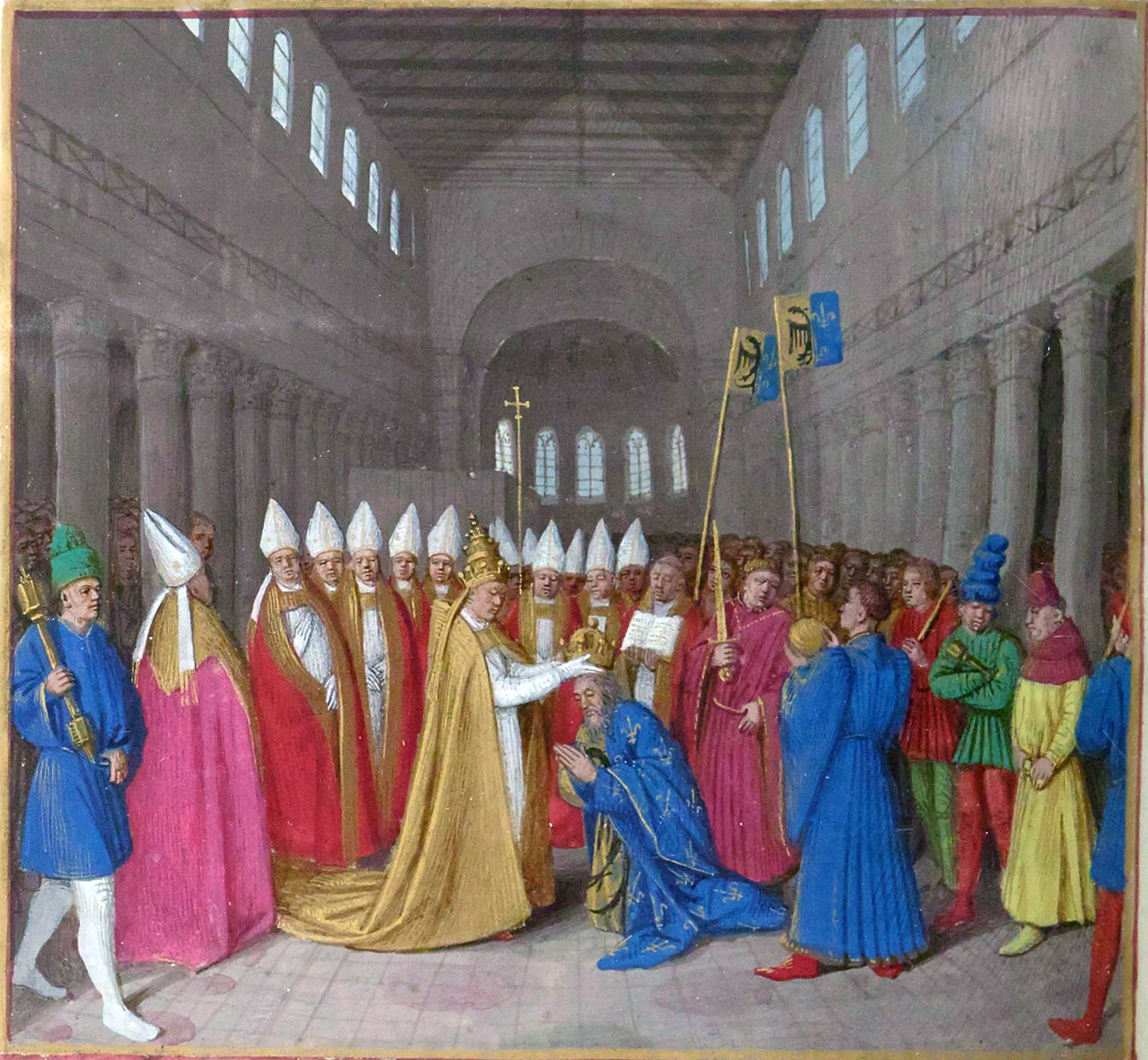
On 25 December 800, Charlemagne was crowned emperor by Pope Leo III.

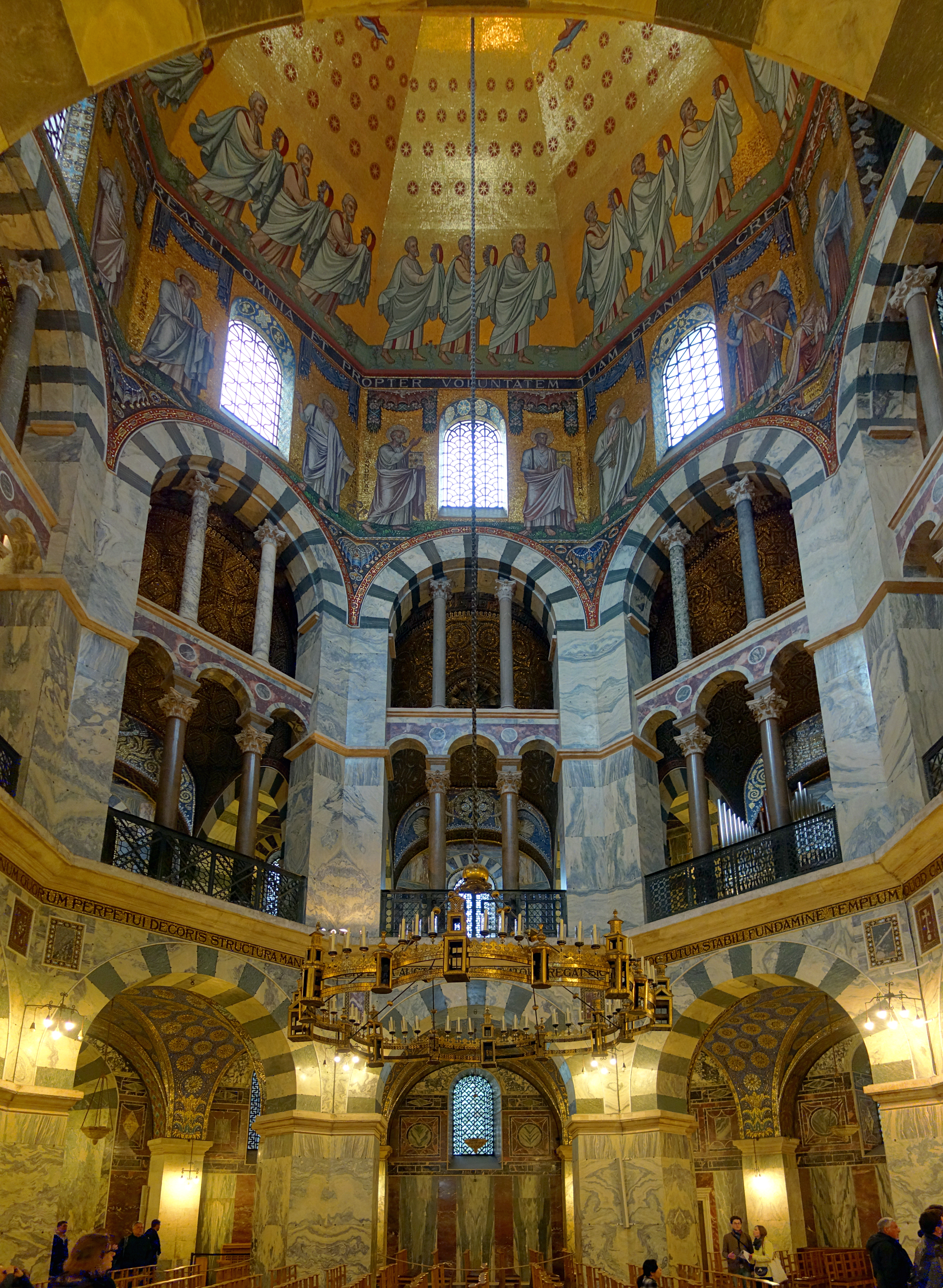
Charlemagne's palace chapel in Aachen, Germany, now the central part of Aachen Cathedral

The Merovingians established themselves in the power vacuum of the former Roman provinces in Gaul, and Clovis I converted to Christianity following his victory over the Alemanni at the Battle of Tolbiac (496), laying the foundation of the Frankish Empire, the dominant state of early medieval Western Christendom. The Frankish kingdom grew through a complex development of conquest, patronage, and alliance building. Due to salic custom, inheritance rights were absolute, and all land was divided equally among the sons of a dead land holder. This meant that, when the king granted a prince land in reward for service, that prince and all of his descendants had an irrevocable right to that land that no future king could undo. Likewise, those princes (and their sons) could sublet their land to their own vassals, who could in turn sublet the land to lower sub-vassals. This all had the effect of weakening the power of the king as his kingdom grew, since the result was that the land became controlled not just by more princes and vassals, but by multiple layers of vassals. This also allowed his nobles to attempt to build their own power base, though given the strict salic tradition of hereditary kingship, few would ever consider overthrowing the king.

This increasingly fragmented arrangement was highlighted by Charles Martel, who as Mayor of the Palace was effectively the strongest prince in the kingdom. His accomplishments were highlighted, not just by his famous defeat of invading Muslims at the Battle of Tours, which is typically considered the battle that saved Europe from Muslim conquest, but by the fact that he greatly expanded Frankish influence. It was under his patronage that Boniface expanded Frankish influence into Germany by rebuilding the German church, with the result that, within a century, the German church was the strongest church in western Europe. Yet despite this, Charles Martel refused to overthrow the Frankish king. His son, Pepin the Short, inherited his power, and used it to further expand Frankish influence. Unlike his father, however, Pepin decided to seize the Frankish kingship. Given how strongly Frankish culture held to its principle of inheritance, few would support him if he attempted to overthrow the king. Instead, he sought the assistance of Pope Zachary, who was himself newly vulnerable due to fallout with the Byzantine Emperor over the Iconoclastic Controversy. Pepin agreed to support the pope and to give him land (the Donation of Pepin, which created the Papal States) in exchange for being consecrated as the new Frankish king. Given that Pepin's claim to the kingship was now based on an authority higher than Frankish custom, no resistance was offered to Pepin. With this, the Merovingian line of kings ended, and the Carolingian line began.

Pepin's son Charlemagne continued in the footsteps of his father and grandfather. He further expanded and consolidated the Frankish kingdom (now commonly called the Carolingian Empire). His reign also saw a cultural rebirth, commonly called the Carolingian Renaissance. Though the exact reasons are unclear, Charlemagne was crowned "Roman Emperor" by Pope Leo III on Christmas Day, 800. Upon Charlemagne's death, his empire had united much of modern-day France, the Low Countries, most of Germany (reaching east to the Elbe River), Switzerland, Austria, Slovenia, northern and central Italy, northwestern Hungary, northern Croatia, and a strip of northeastern Spain.

In 843, Charlemagne's empire was partitioned into West Francia and East Francia. Contemporary sources referred to the first king of East Francia as "rex Germaniae". In West Francia, Vikings occupied and plundered Paris in 845 and then returned four decades later to besiege it again for over a year (885–886). In East Francia, Magyar horse archers annihilated almost the entire secular and ecclesiastical leadership of southeastern Francia in a single battle in 907, clearing the way for the Magyars to raid unchecked across Western Europe for decades. In 911, however, Robert I of France, who had participated in the successful defense of Paris against Vikings in 885, defeated an attacking Viking force at Chartres. The King of West Francia then signed a treaty with the defeated Vikings that established the Duchy of Normandy at the mouth of the Seine, turning former raiders into a defensive bulwark and helping to set in motion West Francia’s evolution into the Kingdom of France. East Francia also showed its resilience by winning decisive victories against the Magyars at Riade (933) and Lechfeld (955) that directly led to it evolving into the Holy Roman Empire.

==== Feudalism ====
Around 800 there was a return to systematic agriculture in the form of the open field, or strip, system. A manor would have several fields, each subdivided into 1-acre (4,000 m^{2}) strips of land. An acre measured one "furlong" of 220 yards by one "chain" of 22 yards (that is, about 200 m by 20 m). A furlong (from "furrow long") was considered to be the distance an ox could plough before taking a rest; the strip shape of the acre field also reflected the difficulty in turning early heavy ploughs. In the idealized form of the system, each family got thirty such strips of land. The three-field system of crop rotation was first developed in the 9th century: wheat or rye was planted in one field, the second field had a nitrogen-fixing crop, and the third was fallow.

Compared to the earlier two-field system, a three-field system allowed for significantly more land to be put under cultivation. Even more important, the system allowed for two harvests a year, reducing the risk that a single crop failure will lead to famine. Three-field agriculture created a surplus of oats that could be used to feed horses. This surplus allowed for the replacement of the ox by the horse after the introduction of the padded horse collar in the 12th century. Because the system required a major rearrangement of real estate and of the social order, it took until the 11th century before it came into general use. The heavy wheeled plough was introduced in the late 10th century. It required greater animal power and promoted the use of teams of oxen. Illuminated manuscripts depict two-wheeled ploughs with both a mouldboard, or curved metal ploughshare, and a coulter, a vertical blade in front of the ploughshare. The Romans had used light, wheel-less ploughs with flat iron shares that often proved unequal to the heavy soils of northern Europe.

The return to systemic agriculture coincided with the introduction of a new social system called feudalism. This system featured a hierarchy of reciprocal obligations. Each man was bound to serve his superior in return for the latter's protection. This made for confusion of territorial sovereignty since allegiances were subject to change over time and were sometimes mutually contradictory. Feudalism allowed the state to provide a degree of public safety despite the continued absence of bureaucracy and written records.

Manors became largely self-sufficient, and the volume of trade along long-distance routes and in market towns declined during this period, though never ceased entirely. Roman roads decayed and long-distance trade depended more heavily on water transport.

=== Viking Age ===
Scandinavian settlements and raiding territory. Note : yellow in England and southern Italy covers the Viking expansion from Normandy, called by the name of Norman: 8th century homeland; 9th century expansion; 10th century expansion; Viking raiding regions

The Viking Age spans the period roughly between the late 8th and mid-11th centuries in Scandinavia and Britain, following the Germanic Iron Age (and the Vendel Age in Sweden). During this period, the Vikings, Scandinavian warriors and traders raided and explored most parts of Europe, south-western Asia, northern Africa, and north-eastern North America.

With the means to travel (longships and open water), desire for goods led Scandinavian traders to explore and develop extensive trading partnerships in new territories. Some of the most important trading ports during the period include both existing and ancient cities such as Aarhus, Ribe, Hedeby, Vineta, Truso, Kaupang, Birka, Bordeaux, York, Dublin, and Aldeigjuborg.

Viking raiding expeditions were separate from, though coexisted with, regular trading expeditions. Apart from exploring Europe via its oceans and rivers, with the aid of their advanced navigational skills, they extended their trading routes across vast parts of the continent. They also engaged in warfare, looting and enslaving numerous Christian communities of medieval Europe for centuries, contributing to the development of feudal systems in Europe.

=== Eastern Europe ===
600–1000

Slavic tribes

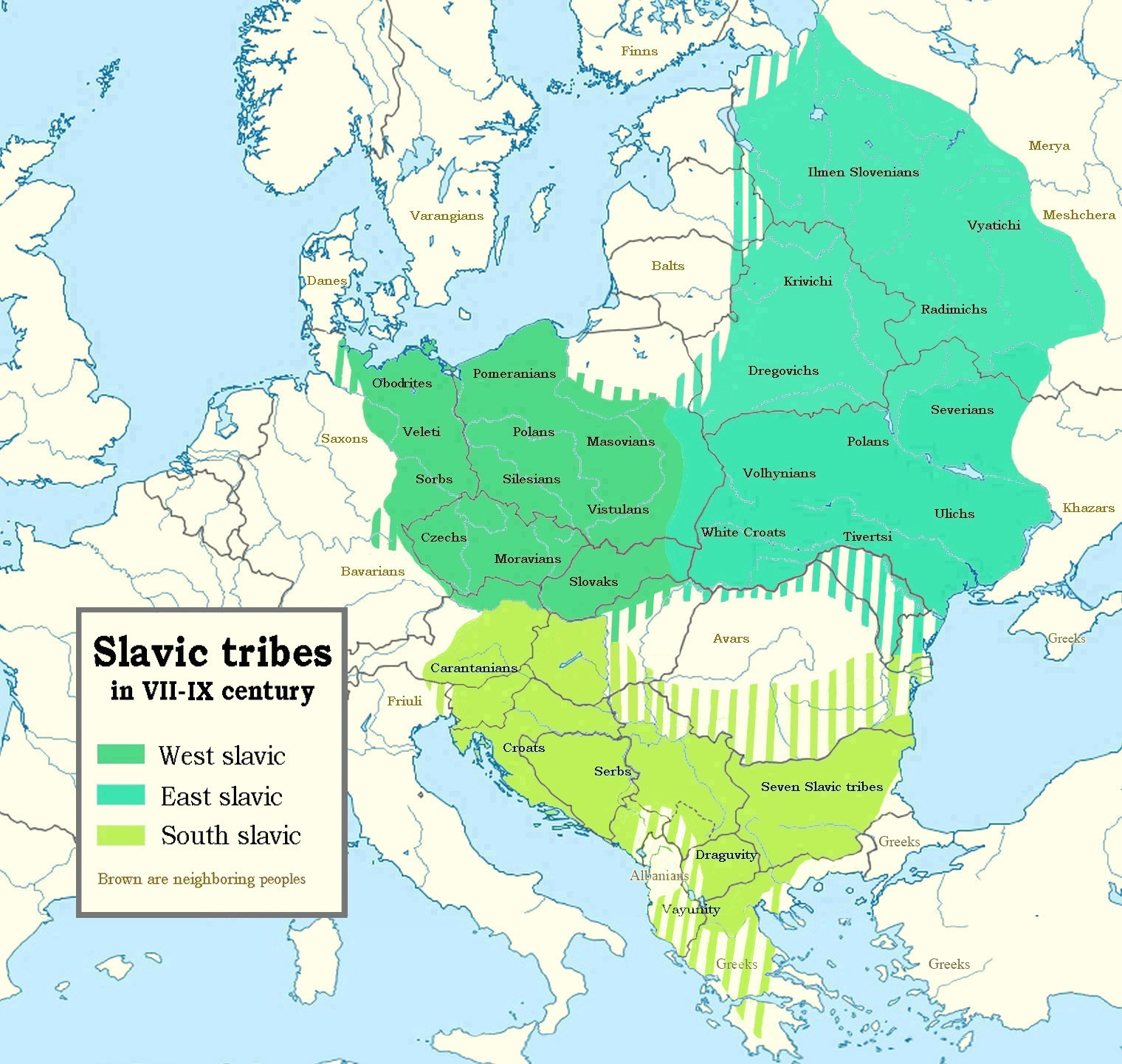
Slavic tribes in central, eastern and southern Europe during the 7th to 9th centuries

In the beginning of the period, the Slavic tribes started to expand aggressively into Central and Southeastern Europe, including former Byzantine possessions in the Balkans. The first attested Slavic polity was the so-called Samo's Empire, followed by Great Moravia, Duchy of Bohemia, Duchy of Croatia and Serbia, also emerging under the aegis of the Frankish Empire in the early 9th century. Great Moravia was ultimately overrun by the Magyars, who invaded the Pannonian Basin around 896.

After the Christianization of the First Bulgarian Empire (c. 864) and with key support from Byzantine scholars, the early Cyrillic alphabet, purpose-built for Slavic phonology, was developed there. An increasing rivalry between the Greek East and Latin West was then expressed in an intense missionary competition through the 9th and 10th centuries, in which Cyrillic played an important role. While Moravia (c. 863), Bohemia (c. 884) Croatia (by 900), and Poland (966) were drawn into the Latin West, the Serbs (c. 870) and Kievan Rus' (988) embraced Cyrillic and instead linked themselves with the Greek East. In those areas, the Byzantine Empire influenced almost every aspect of cultural and political development, including the preeminence of Caesaropapism and the spread of Eastern Christianity.

Magyar tribes

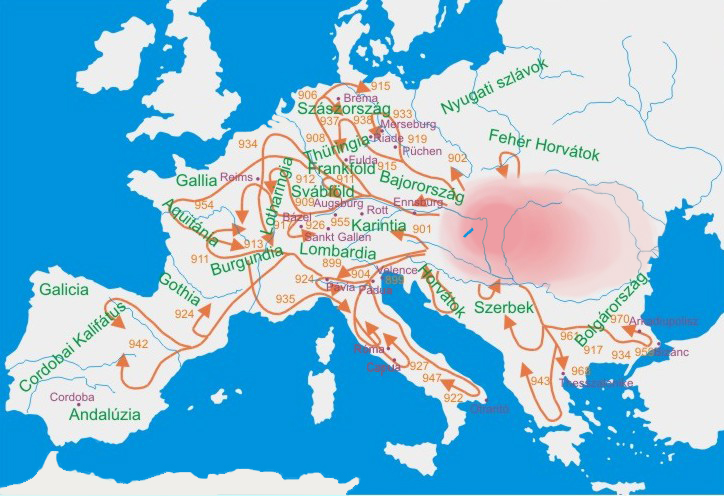
Magyar campaigns in the 10th century

Magyar region

Turkic and Iranian invaders from Central Asia pressured the agricultural populations both in the Byzantine Balkans and in Central Europe creating a number of successor states in the Pontic steppes. After the dissolution of the Hunnic Empire, the Western Turkic and Avar Khaganates dominated territories from Pannonia to the Caspian Sea before being replaced by the short lived Old Great Bulgaria and the more successful Khazar Khaganate north of the Black Sea and the Magyars in Central Europe.

The Khazars were a nomadic Turkic people who managed to develop a multiethnic commercial state which owed its success to the control of much of the waterway trade between Europe and Central Asia. The Khazars also exacted tribute from the Alani, Magyars, various Slavic tribes, the Crimean Goths, and the Greeks of Crimea. Through a network of Jewish itinerant merchants, or Radhanites, they were in contact with the trade emporia of India and Spain.

Once they found themselves confronted by Arab expansionism, the Khazars pragmatically allied themselves with Constantinople and clashed with the Caliphate. Despite initial setbacks, they managed to recover Derbent and eventually penetrated as far south as Caucasian Iberia, Caucasian Albania and Armenia. In doing so, they effectively blocked the northward expansion of Islam into Eastern Europe even before khan Tervel achieved the same at the Second Arab Siege of Constantinople and several decades before the Battle of Tours in Western Europe. Islam eventually penetrated into Eastern Europe in the 920s when Volga Bulgaria exploited the decline of Khazar power in the region to adopt Islam from the Baghdad missionaries. The state religion of Khazaria, Judaism, disappeared as a political force with the fall of Khazaria, while Islam of Volga Bulgaria has survived in the region up to the present.

==== Bulgaria ====
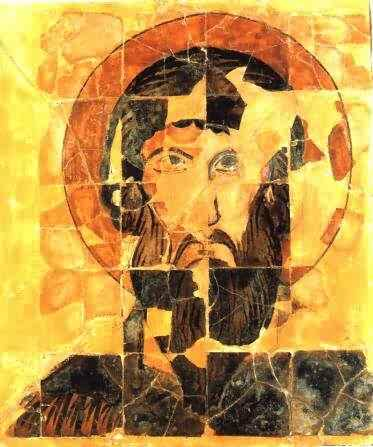
Ceramic icon of St Theodore from around 900, found in Preslav, Bulgarian capital from 893 to 972

In 632 the Bulgars established the khanate of Old Great Bulgaria under the leadership of Kubrat. The Khazars managed to oust the Bulgars from Southern Ukraine into lands along middle Volga (Volga Bulgaria) and along lower Danube (Danube Bulgaria).

In 681 the Bulgars founded a powerful and ethnically diverse state that played a defining role in the history of early medieval Southeastern Europe. Bulgaria withstood the pressure from Pontic steppe tribes like the Pechenegs, Khazars, and Cumans, and in 806 destroyed the Avar Khanate. The Danube Bulgars were quickly slavicized and, despite constant campaigning against Constantinople, accepted Christianity from the Byzantine Empire. Through the efforts of missionaries Cyril and Methodius, mainly their disciples like Clement of Ohrid and Naum, the spread, initially of the Glagolitic, and later of the Cyrillic alphabet, developed in the capital Preslav. The local vernacular dialect, now known as Old Bulgarian or Old Church Slavonic, was established as the language of books and liturgy among Orthodox Christian Slavs.

After the adoption of Christianity in 864, Bulgaria became a cultural and spiritual hub of the Eastern Orthodox Slavic world. The Cyrillic script was developed around 885–886, and was afterwards also introduced with books to Serbia and Kievan Rus'. Literature, art, and architecture were thriving with the establishment of the Preslav and Ohrid Literary Schools along with the distinct Preslav Ceramics School. In 927 the Bulgarian Orthodox Church was the first European national Church to gain independence with its own Patriarch while conducting services in the vernacular Old Church Slavonic.

Under Simeon I (893–927), the state was the largest and one of the most powerful political entities of Europe, and it consistently threatened the existence of the Byzantine empire. From the middle of the 10th century Bulgaria was in decline as it entered a social and spiritual turmoil. It was in part due to Simeon's devastating wars, but was also exacerbated by a series of successful Byzantine military campaigns. Bulgaria was conquered after a long resistance in 1018.

==== Kievan Rus' ====
Led by a Varangian dynasty, the Kievan Rus' controlled the routes connecting Northern Europe to Byzantium and to the Orient (for example: the Volga trade route). The Kievan state began with the rule (882–912) of Prince Oleg, who extended his control from Novgorod southwards along the Dnieper river valley in order to protect trade from Khazar incursions from the east and moved his capital to the more strategic Kiev. Sviatoslav I (died 972) achieved the first major expansion of Kievan Rus' territorial control, fighting a war of conquest against the Khazar Empire and inflicting a serious blow on Bulgaria. A Rus' attack (967 or 968), instigated by the Byzantines, led to the collapse of the Bulgarian state and the occupation of the east of the country by the Rus'. An ensuing direct military confrontation between the Rus' and Byzantium (970–971) ended with a Byzantine victory (971). The Rus' withdrew and the Byzantine Empire incorporated eastern Bulgaria. Both before and after their conversion to Christianity (conventionally dated 988 under Vladimir I of Kiev—known as Vladimir the Great), the Rus' also embarked on predatory military campaigns against the Byzantine Empire, some of which resulted in trade treaties. The importance of Russo-Byzantine relations to Constantinople was highlighted by the fact that Vladimir I of Kiev, son of Svyatoslav I, became the only foreigner to marry (989) a Byzantine princess of the Macedonian dynasty (which ruled the Eastern Roman Empire from 867 to 1056), a singular honour sought in vain by many other rulers.

== Transmission of learning ==
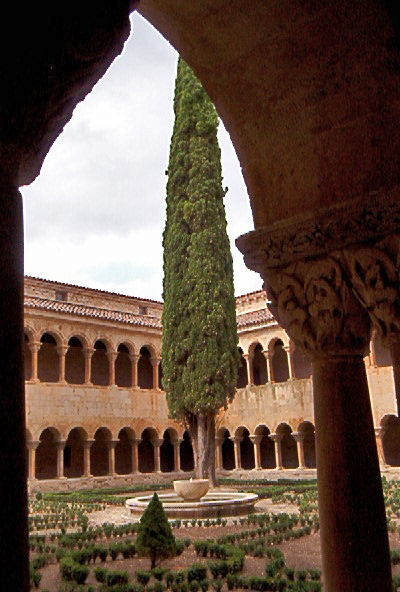
Abbey of Santo Domingo de Silos. In the Early Middle Ages, cultural life was concentrated at monasteries.

With the fall of the Western Roman Empire and with urban centres in decline, literacy and learning decreased in the West. De-urbanization reduced the scope of education, and by the 6th century teaching and learning moved to monastic and cathedral schools, with the study of biblical texts at the centre of education. The education of the laity continued with little interruption in Italy, Spain, and the southern part of Gaul, where Roman influences lasted longer. In the 7th century, however, learning expanded in Ireland and the Celtic lands, where Latin was a foreign language and Latin texts were eagerly studied and taught. The Carolingian Renaissance of classical education appeared in the Carolingian Empire in the 8th century.

In the Eastern Roman Empire (Byzantium), learning (in the sense of formal education involving literature) was maintained at a higher level than in the West. The classical education system, which would persist for hundreds of years, emphasized grammar, Latin, Greek, and rhetoric. Pupils read and reread classic works and wrote essays imitating their style. By the 4th century, this education system was Christianized. In De Doctrina Christiana (started 396, completed 426), Augustine explained how classical education fits into the Christian worldview: Christianity is a religion of the book, so Christians must be literate. Tertullian was more skeptical of the value of classical learning, asking "What indeed has Athens to do with Jerusalem?"

=== Natural philosophy ===
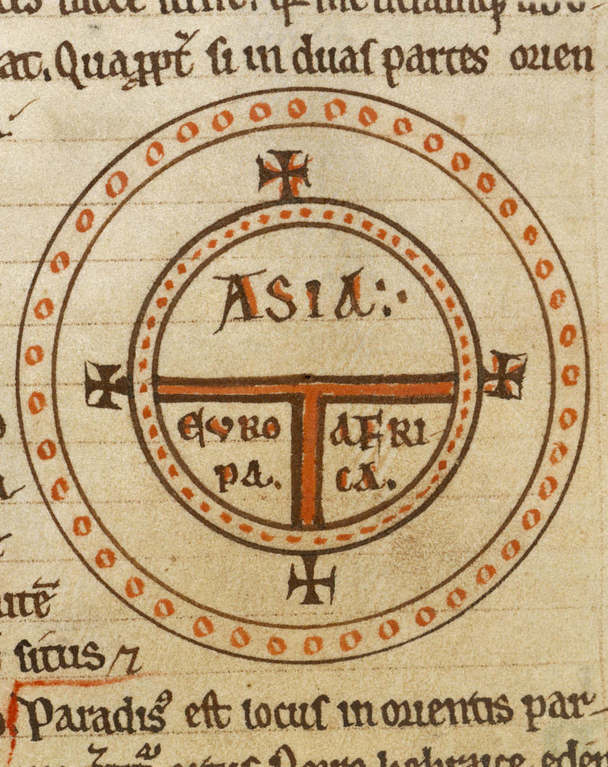
This "T and O map", from Isidore of Seville's Etymologiae (c. 625) identifies the world's continents (Asia, Europe and Africa).

In the ancient world, Greek was the primary language of natural philosophy. Organized research and teaching about the natural world was mainly carried on in the Hellenistic side of the Roman empire, and in Greek. Late Roman attempts to translate Greek writings into Latin had limited success. As the import of papyrus ceased and knowledge of Greek declined, the Latin West found itself cut off from Greek learning. The period between the 4th and the 8th centuries was the era of the "Latin Encyclopedists". The most popular and notable of their works was Etymologiae, a vast compendium of human knowledge at the time, including mathematics, geometry, astronomy, medicine, animals, the physical world, geography, metals and rocks compiled by Bishop Isidore of Seville (c. 560-636).

The study of nature was pursued more for practical reasons than as an abstract inquiry: the need to care for the sick led to the study of medicine and of ancient texts on drugs; the need for monks to determine the proper time to pray led them to study the motion of the stars; and the need to compute the date of Easter led them to study and teach mathematics and the motions of the Sun and Moon.

=== Carolingian Renaissance ===
In the late 8th century, there was renewed interest in Classical Antiquity as part of the Carolingian Renaissance. Charlemagne carried out a reform in education. The English monk Alcuin of York elaborated a project of scholarly development aimed at resuscitating classical knowledge by establishing programs of study based upon the seven liberal arts: the trivium, or literary education (grammar, rhetoric, and dialectic), and the quadrivium, or scientific education (arithmetic, geometry, astronomy, and music). From 787 on, decrees began to circulate recommending the restoration of old schools and the founding of new ones across the empire.

Institutionally, these new schools were either under the responsibility of a monastery (monastic schools), a cathedral, or a noble court. The teaching of dialectic (a discipline that corresponds to today's logic) was responsible for the increase in the interest in speculative inquiry; from this interest would follow the rise of the Scholastic tradition of Christian philosophy. In the 12th and 13th centuries, many of those schools founded under the auspices of Charlemagne, especially cathedral schools, would become universities.

=== Byzantium's golden age ===
Macedonian Byzantium

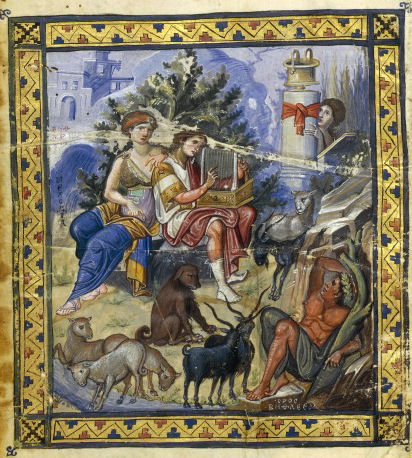
Miniature from the Paris Psalter

Byzantium in the 10th century experienced a wide-scale cultural revival.

Byzantium's great intellectual achievement was the Corpus Juris Civilis ("Body of Civil Law"), a massive compilation of Roman law made under Justinian (r. 528–565). The work includes a section called the Digesta which abstracts the principles of Roman law in such a way that they can be applied to any situation. The level of literacy was considerably higher in the Byzantine Empire than in the Latin West. Elementary education was much more widely available, sometimes even in the countryside. Secondary schools still taught the Iliad and other classics.

As for higher education, the Neoplatonic Academy in Athens was closed in 526. There was also a school in Alexandria which remained open until the Arab conquest (640). The University of Constantinople, founded by Emperor Theodosius II (425), seems to have dissolved around this time. It was refounded by Emperor Michael III in 849. Higher education in this period focused on rhetoric, although Aristotle's logic was covered in simple outline. Under the Macedonian dynasty (867–1056), Byzantium enjoyed a golden age and a revival of classical learning. There was little original research, but many lexicons, anthologies, encyclopedias, and commentaries.

=== Islamic learning ===
In the course of the 11th century, Islam's scientific knowledge began to reach Western Europe, via Islamic Spain. The works of Euclid and Archimedes, lost in the West, were translated from Arabic to Latin in Spain. The modern Hindu–Arabic numeral system, including a notation for zero, was developed by Hindu mathematicians in the 5th and 6th centuries. Muslim mathematicians learned of it in the 7th century and added a notation for decimal fractions in the 9th and 10th centuries. Around 1000, Gerbert of Aurillac (later Pope Sylvester II) made an abacus with counters engraved with Arabic numerals. A treatise by Al-Khwārizmī on how to perform calculations with these numerals was translated into Latin in Spain in the 12th century.

=== Monasteries ===
Monasteries were targeted in the eighth and ninth centuries by Vikings who invaded the coasts of northern Europe. They were targeted not only because they stored books but also precious objects that were looted by invaders. In the earliest monasteries, there were no special rooms set aside as a library, but from the sixth century onwards libraries became an essential aspect of monastic life in Western Europe. The Benedictines placed books in the care of a librarian who supervised their use. In some monastic reading rooms, valuable books would be chained to shelves, but there were also lending sections as well. Copying was also another important aspect of monastic libraries, this was undertaken by resident or visiting monks and took place in the scriptorium. In the Byzantine world, religious houses rarely maintained their own copying centres. Instead they acquired donations from wealthy donors. In the tenth century, the largest collection in the Byzantine world was found in the monasteries of Mount Athos (modern-day Greece), which accumulated over 10,000 books. Scholars travelled from one monastery to another in search of the texts they wished to study. Travelling monks were often given funds to buy books, and certain monasteries which held a reputation for intellectual activities welcomed travelling monks who came to copy manuscripts for their own libraries. One of these was the monastery of Bobbio in Italy, which was founded by the Irish abbot Columbanus in 614, and by the ninth century boasted a catalogue of 666 manuscripts, including religious works, classical texts, histories and mathematical treatises.

== Christianity West and East ==
Medieval Christians

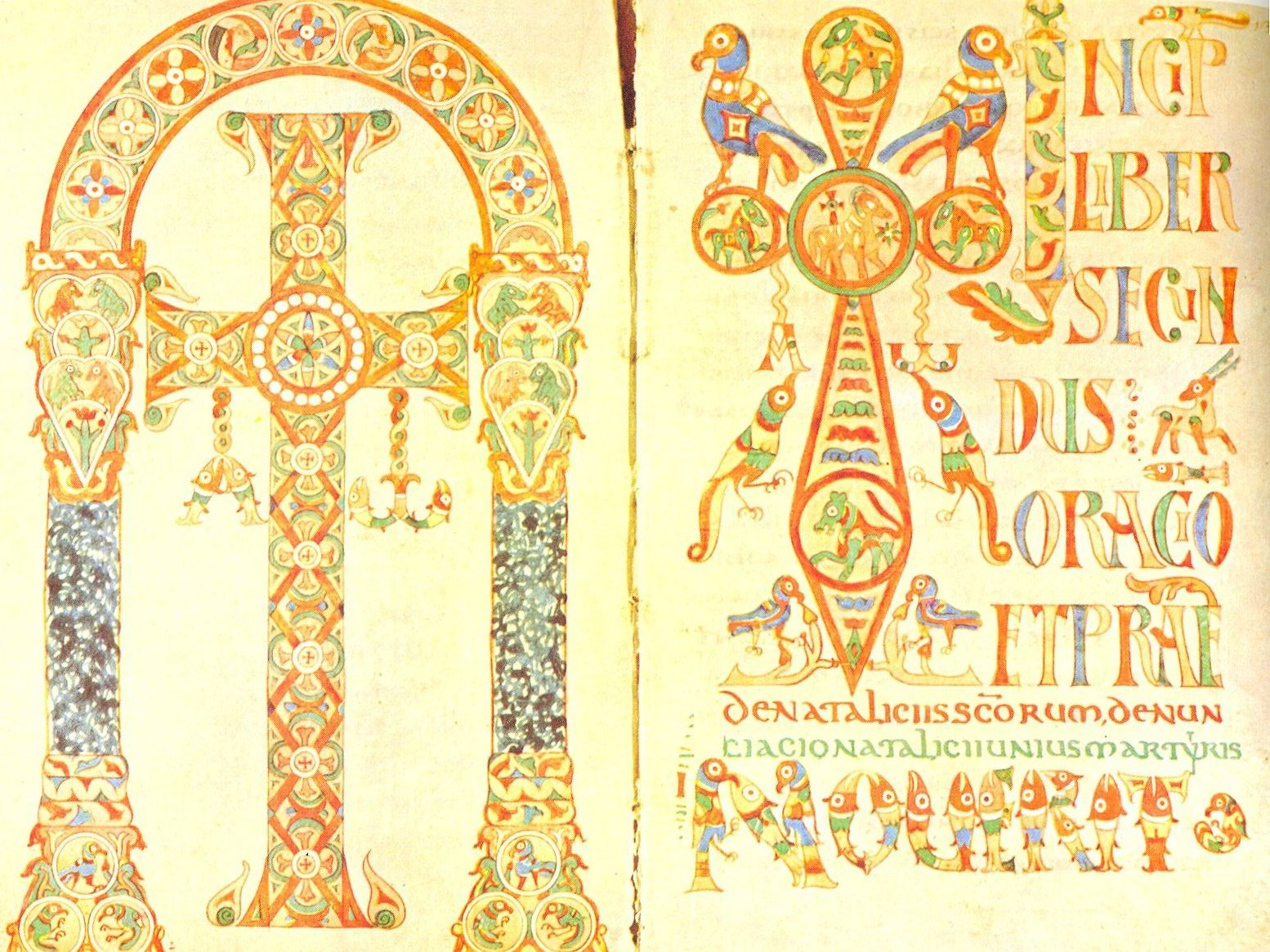
Sacramentarium Gelasianum.

Frontispiece of Incipit from the Vatican manuscript

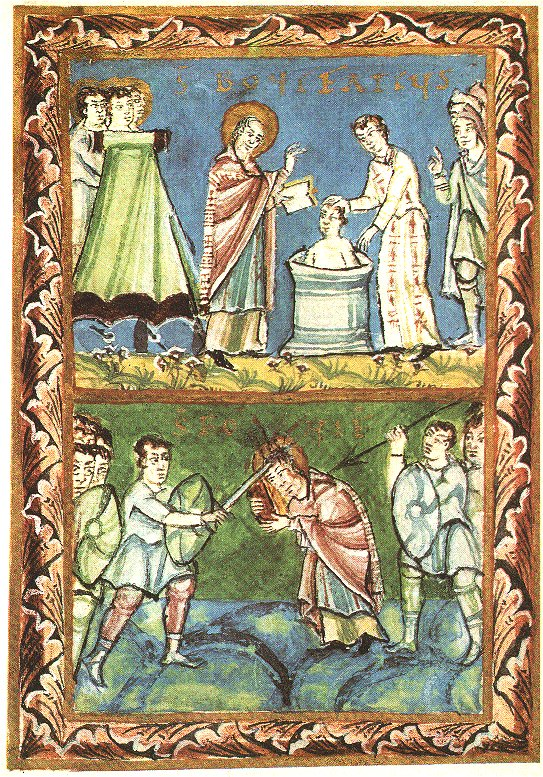
St Boniface – Baptism and Martyrdom.

From the early Christians, early medieval Christians inherited a church united by major creeds, a stable Biblical canon, and a well-developed philosophical tradition. The history of medieval Christianity traces Christianity during the Middle Ages—the period after the fall of the Western Roman Empire until the Protestant Reformation. The institutional structure of Christianity in the west during this period is different from what it would become later in the Middle Ages. As opposed to the later church, the church of the Early Middle Ages consisted primarily of the monasteries. The practice of simony has caused the ecclesiastical offices to become the property of local princes, and as such the monasteries constituted the only church institution independent of the local princes. In addition, the papacy was relatively weak, and its power was mostly confined to central Italy. Individualized religious practice was uncommon, as it typically required membership in a religious order, such as the Order of Saint Benedict. Religious orders would not proliferate until the high Middle Ages. For the typical Christian at this time, religious participation was largely confined to occasionally receiving mass from wandering monks. Few would receive this as often as once a month. By the end of this period, individual practice of religion was becoming more common, as monasteries started to transform into something approximating modern churches, where some monks might even give occasional sermons.

During the period of the Byzantine Papacy (537–752), the bishops of Rome required Byzantine approval of their elevation, and many bishops were selected from among the apocrisiarii, ambassadors to the Byzantine court in Constantinople. Before becoming the Bishop of Rome, Pope Gregory I (r. 590–604) - known later as "St. Gregory the Great" and as one of the four Great Latin Church Fathers - first served as an ambassador to Constantinople for 7 years. After his elevation, however, Gregory used his office as a temporal power, expanded Rome's missionary efforts to the British Isles, and laid the foundations for the expansion of monastic orders. Boniface III (r. 607) became the first bishop of Rome to use the title Pope and Pope Theodore I (r. 642-649) the first to formally assume the title of Patriarch of the West. Roman church traditions and practices gradually replaced local variants, including Celtic Christianity in the British Isles. Various barbarian tribes went from raiding and pillaging the island to invading and settling. In the East, the conquests of Islam reduced the power of the Greek-speaking patriarchates.

=== Christianization of the West ===
The Roman Church, the only centralized institution to survive the fall of the Western Roman Empire intact, was the sole unifying cultural influence in the West, preserving Latin learning, maintaining the art of writing, and preserving a centralized administration through its network of bishops ordained in succession. In Europe, a formalized institution of marriage was established. The proscribed degree of consanguinity varied, but the custom made marriages annullable by application to the Pope. The Early Middle Ages are characterized by the urban control of bishops and the territorial control exercised by dukes and counts. The rise of urban communes marked the beginning of the High Middle Ages.

The Christianization of Germanic tribes began in the 4th century with the Goths and continued throughout the Early Middle Ages, led in the 6th to 7th centuries by the Hiberno-Scottish mission and replaced in the 8th to 9th centuries by the Anglo-Saxon mission, with Anglo-Saxons like Alcuin playing an important role in the Carolingian Renaissance. Boniface, the Apostle of the Germans, propagated Christianity in the Frankish Empire during the 8th century. He helped shape Western Christianity, and many of the dioceses he proposed remain until today. After his martyrdom, he was quickly hailed as a saint. By 1000, even Iceland had become Christian, leaving only more remote parts of Europe (Scandinavia, the Baltic, and Finnic lands) to be Christianized during the High Middle Ages.

== Europe in 1000 ==
While the assumption that Europeans feared the world would end in the year 1000 is popular today, such beliefs were largely confined to a few select monasteries in France. Ordinary clerks used regnal years, e.g. the 4th year of the reign of Robert II (the Pious) of France. The use of the modern "anno domini" system of dating was largely confined to chroniclers of universal history, such as the Venerable Bede.

Western Europe remained less developed compared to the Islamic world, with its vast network of caravan trade, or China, at this time the world's most populous empire under the Song dynasty. Constantinople had a population of about 300,000, but Rome had a mere 35,000 and Paris 20,000. By contrast, Córdoba, in Islamic Spain, at this time the world's largest city contained 450,000 inhabitants. The Vikings had a trade network in northern Europe, including a route connecting the Baltic to Constantinople through Russia, as did the Radhanites.

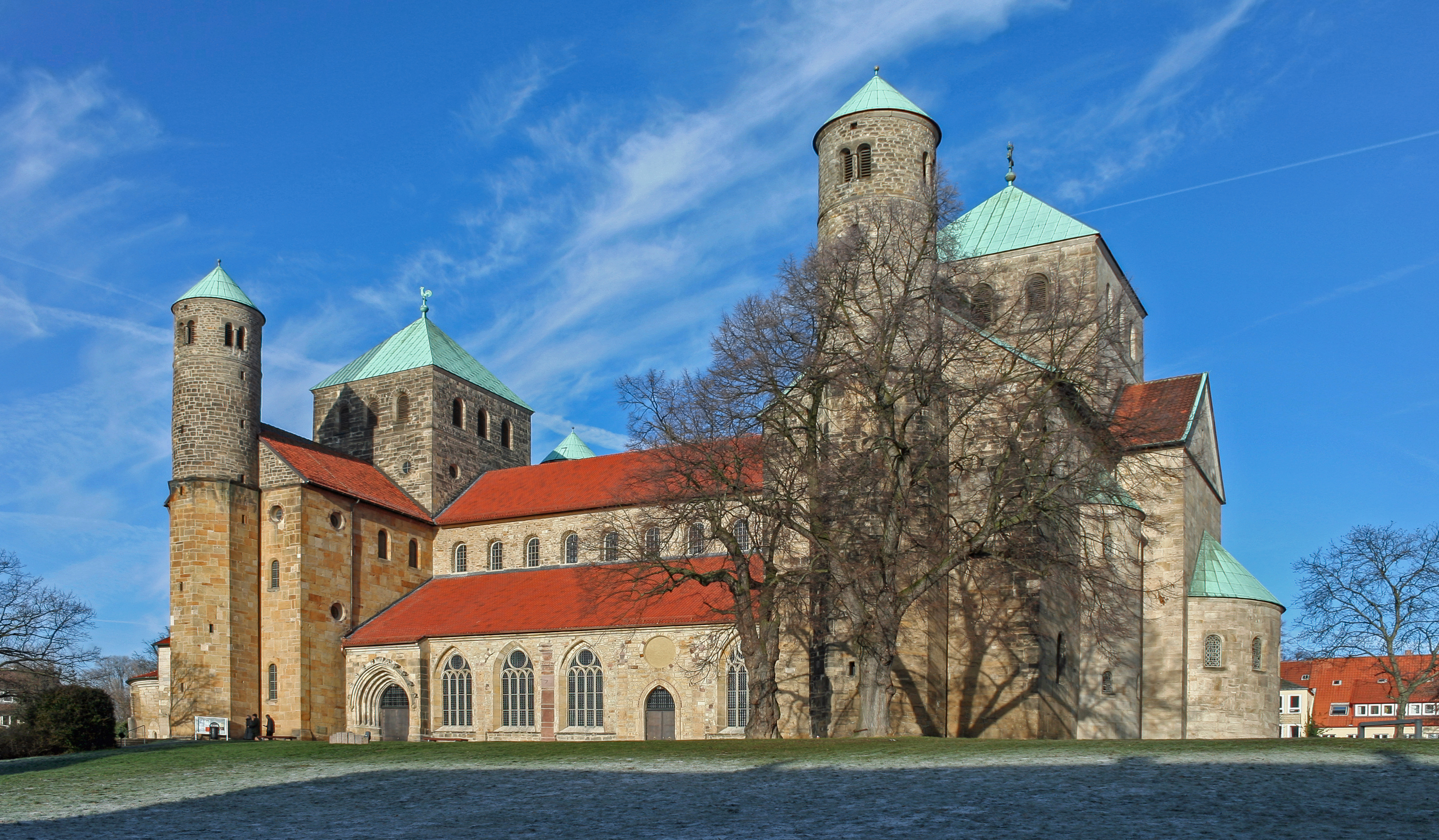
St. Michael's Church, Hildesheim, Germany, 1010s. Ottonian architecture draws its inspiration from Carolingian and Byzantine architecture.

With nearly the entire nation freshly ravaged by the Vikings, England was in a desperate state. The long-suffering English later responded with a massacre of Danish settlers in 1002, leading to a round of reprisals and finally to Danish rule (1013), though England regained independence shortly after. Christianization made rapid progress and proved itself the long-term solution to the problem of barbarian raiding. The territories of Scandinavia were soon to be fully Christianized Kingdoms: Denmark in the 10th century, Norway in the 11th, and Sweden, the country with the least raiding activity, in the 12th. Kievan Rus, recently converted to Orthodox Christianity, flourished as the largest state in Europe. Iceland, Greenland, and Hungary were all declared Christian about 1000.

North of Italy, where masonry construction was never extinguished, stone construction was replacing timber in important structures. Deforestation of the densely wooded continent was under way. The 10th century marked a return of urban life, with the Italian cities doubling in population. London, abandoned for many centuries, was again England's main economic centre by 1000. By 1000, Bruges and Ghent held regular trade fairs behind castle walls, a tentative return of economic life to western Europe.

In the culture of Europe, several features surfaced soon after 1000 that mark the end of the Early Middle Ages: the rise of the medieval communes, the reawakening of city life, and the appearance of the burgher class, the founding of the first universities, the rediscovery of Roman law, and the beginnings of vernacular literature.

In 1000, the papacy was firmly under the control of German Emperor Otto III, or "emperor of the world" as he styled himself. But later church reforms enhanced its independence and prestige: the Cluniac movement, the building of the first great Transalpine stone cathedrals and the collation of the mass of accumulated decretals into a formulated canon law. Meanwhile, a new Central European power was taking shape, and on Christmas Day of 1000, Stephen I was crowned as the first king of Hungary, stabilising the country, which had been ruled by grand princes. Like the Civitas Schinesghe, which was also consolidating at the time, the country was seen as a promising political and trading partner, and a federati (ally) by the emperor.

== Middle East ==
=== Rise of Islam ===
Consult particular article for details

Rise of Islam

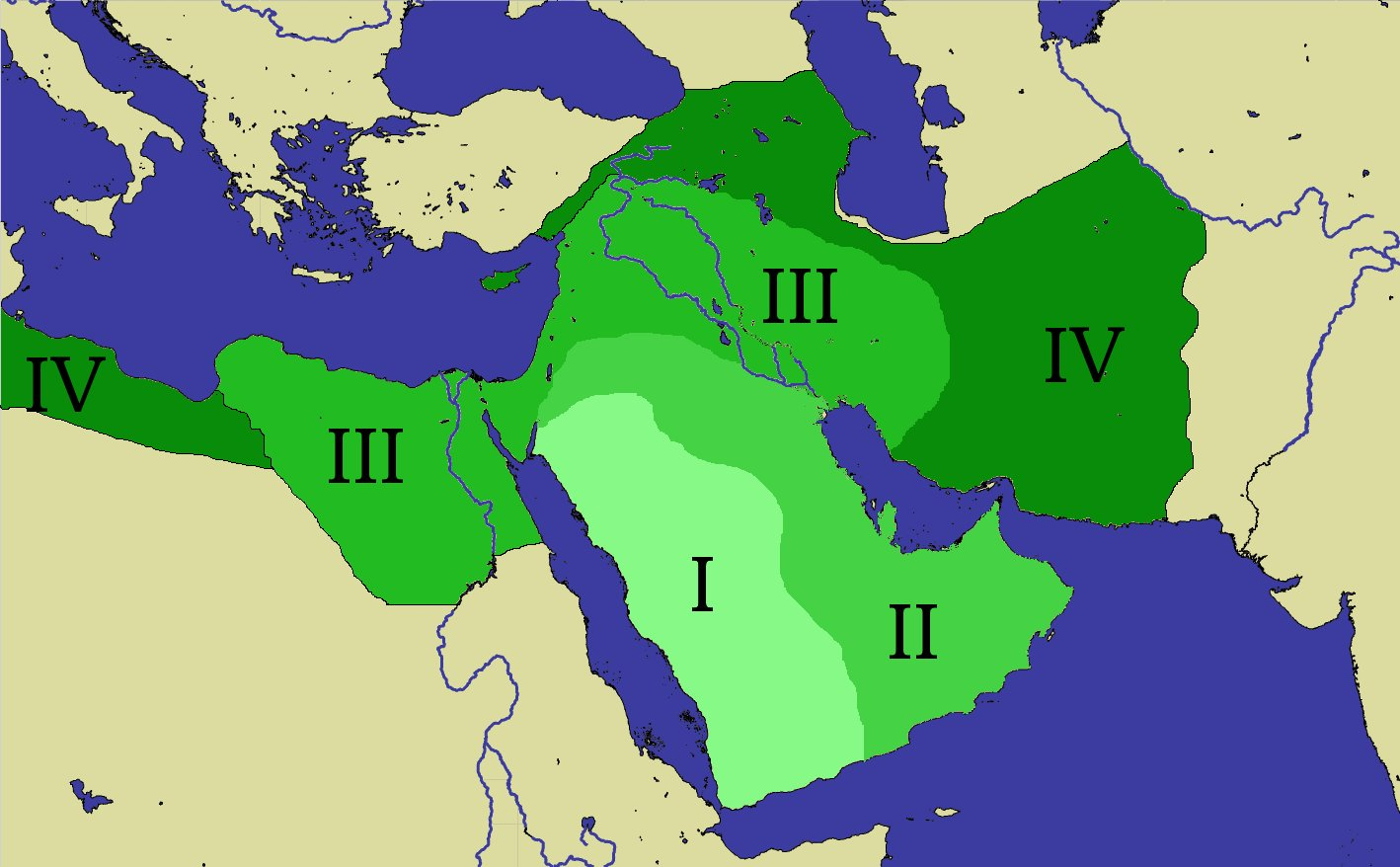
Arab expansion in the 7th century
- Area I : Muhammad
- Area II : Abu Bakr
- Area III : Omar
- Area IV : Uthman

The rise of Islam begins around the time Muhammad and his followers took flight, the Hijra, from Mecca to the city of Medina. Muhammad spent his last ten years in a series of battles to conquer the Arabian region. From 622 to 632, Muhammad as the leader of a Muslim community in Medina was engaged in a state of war with the Meccans. In the proceeding decades, the area of Basra was conquered by the Muslims. During the reign of Umar, the Muslim army found it a suitable place to construct a base. Later the area was settled and a mosque was erected. Madyan was conquered and settled by Muslims, but the environment was considered harsh and the settlers moved to Kufa. Umar defeated the rebellion of several Arab tribes in a successful campaign, unifying the entire Arabian peninsula and giving it stability. Under Uthman's leadership, the empire, through the Muslim conquest of Persia, expanded into Fars in 650, some areas of Khorasan in 651, and the conquest of Armenia was begun in the 640s. In this time, the Rashidun Caliphate extended over the whole Sassanid Persian Empire and to more than two-thirds of the Eastern Roman Empire. The First Fitna, or the First Islamic Civil War, lasted for the entirety of Ali ibn Abi Talib's reign. After the recorded peace treaty with Hassan ibn Ali and the suppression of early Kharijites' disturbances, Muawiyah I acceded to the position of Caliph.

During this era, Medieval Egypt underwent a profound transformation, moving from a Christian Byzantine province to an independent, sovereign Islamic state and a major founding center of the Islamic world. This era permanently reshaped the region's religion, language, culture, and political governance.

=== Islamic expansion ===
Muslim Expansions in 7th & 8th Centuries

The Islamic expansion of the 7th and 8th centuries
- Muhammad's conquests, 622–632
- Rashidun Caliphate, 632–661
- Umayyad Caliphate, 661–750

The Muslim conquests of the Eastern Roman Empire and Arab wars occurred between 634 and 750. Starting in 633, Muslims conquered Iraq. The Muslim conquest of Syria would begin in 634 and would be complete by 638. The Muslim conquest of Egypt started in 639. Before the Muslim invasion of Egypt began, the Eastern Roman Empire had already lost the Levant and its Arab ally, the Ghassanid Kingdom, to the Muslims. The Muslims would bring Alexandria under control and the fall of Egypt would be complete by 642. Between 647 and 709, Muslims swept across North Africa and established their authority over that region.

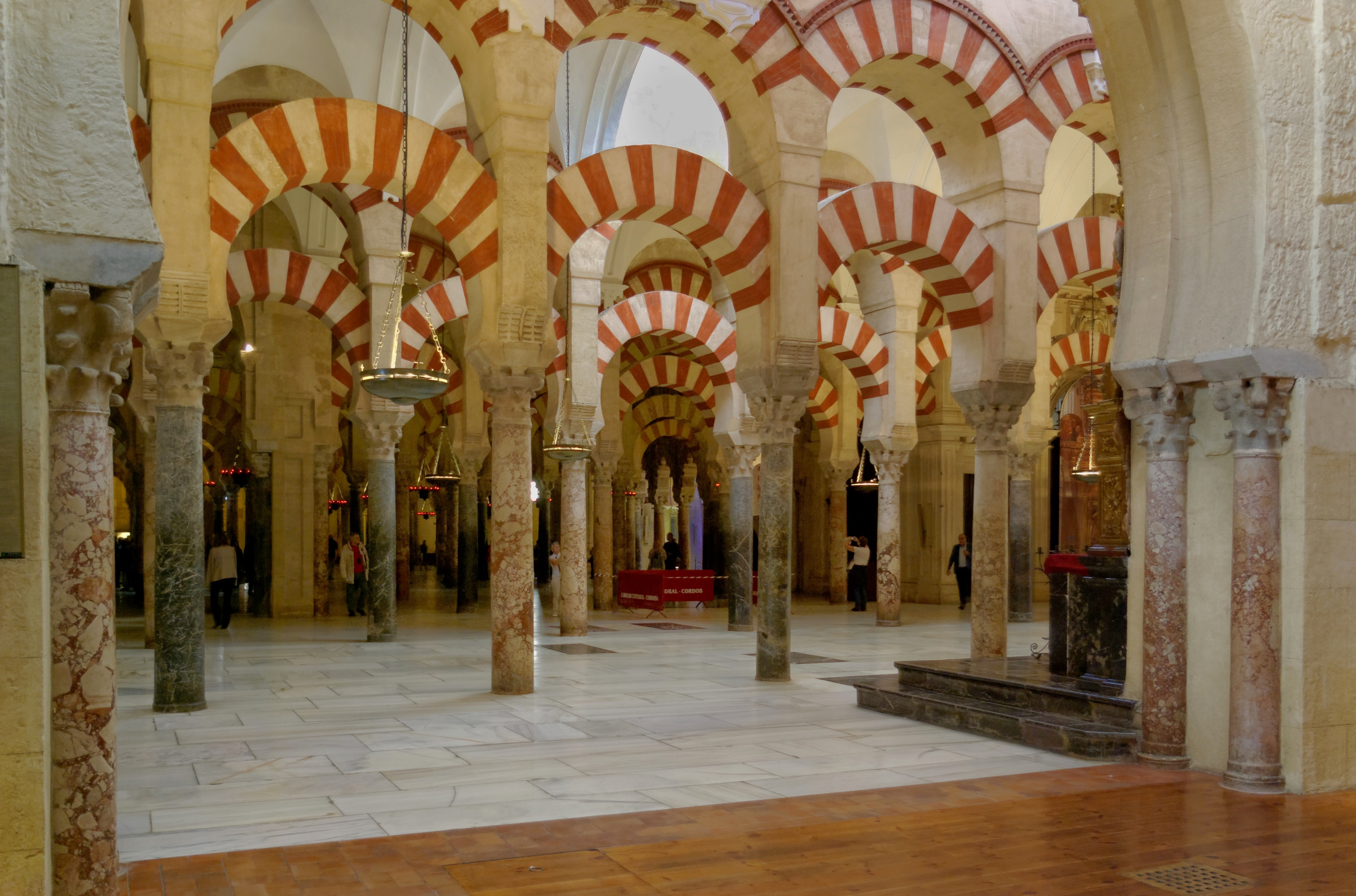
The 10th-century Grand Mosque of Cordoba, Córdoba, Spain

The site of the Grand Mosque was originally a pagan temple, then a Visigothic Christian church, before the Umayyad Moors at first converted the building into a mosque and then built a new mosque on the site.

The Transoxiana region was conquered by Qutayba ibn Muslim between 706 and 715 and loosely held by the Umayyads from 715 to 738. This conquest was consolidated by Nasr ibn Sayyar between 738 and 740. It was under the Umayyads from 740 to 748 and under the Abbasids after 748. Sindh, attacked in 664, would be subjugated by 712. Sindh became the easternmost province of the Umayyad. The Umayyad conquest of Hispania (Visigothic Spain) would begin in 711 and end by 718. The Moors, under Al-Samh ibn Malik, swept up the Iberian peninsula and by 719 overran Septimania; the area would fall under their full control in 720. With the Islamic conquest of Persia, the Muslim subjugation of the Caucasus would take place between 711 and 750. The end of the sudden Islamic Caliphate expansion ended around this time. The final Islamic dominion eroded the areas of the Iron Age Roman Empire in the Middle East and controlled strategic areas of the Mediterranean.

At the end of the 8th century, the former Western Roman Empire was decentralized and overwhelmingly rural. The Islamic conquest and rule of Sicily and Malta was a process which started in the 9th century. Islamic rule over Sicily was effective from 902, and the complete rule of the island lasted from 965 until 1061. The Islamic presence on the Italian Peninsula was ephemeral and limited mostly to semi-permanent soldier camps.

=== Caliphs and empire ===
The Abbasid Caliphate, ruled by the Abbasid dynasty of caliphs, was the third of the Islamic caliphates. Under the Abbasids, the Islamic Golden Age philosophers, scientists, and engineers of the Islamic world contributed enormously to technology, both by preserving earlier traditions and by adding their own inventions and innovations. Scientific and intellectual achievements blossomed in the period.

The Abbasids built their capital in Baghdad after replacing the Umayyad caliphs from all but the Iberian peninsula. The influence held by Muslim merchants over African-Arabian and Arabian-Asian trade routes was tremendous. As a result, Islamic civilization grew and expanded on the basis of its merchant economy, in contrast to their Christian, Indian, and Chinese peers who built societies from an agricultural landholding nobility.

The Abbasids flourished for two centuries but slowly went into decline with the rise to power of the Turkish army they had created, the Mamluks. Within 150 years of gaining control of Persia, the caliphs were forced to cede power to local dynastic emirs who only nominally acknowledged their authority. After the Abbasids lost their military dominance, the Iranian Samanids (or Samanid Empire) rose up in Central Asia.

== Timeline ==
=== Beginning years ===
Dates

- 410: Visigoths under Alaric I sack Rome
- 430: Death of Saint Augustine
- 476: Odoacer deposes Romulus Augustus
- 496: Battle of Tolbiac, Clovis I converts to Chalcedonianism
- 507: Battle of Vouillé
- 527–565: Justinian I
- 535–552: Gothic Wars
- 541–542: Plague of Justinian in Constantinople
- 547: death of Benedict of Nursia
- c. 570: birth of Muhammad
- 590–604 Pope Gregory I
- 597: death of Columba
- 602–629: Last great Roman–Persian War
- 615: death of Columbanus
- 626: Joint Persian-Avar-Slav Siege of Constantinople
- 632: death of Muhammad
- 636: death of Isidore of Seville
- 674–678: First Arab siege of Constantinople
- 681: First Bulgarian Empire established

=== Ending years ===
Dates

- 7th century: Khazar empire established
- 711–718: Umayyad conquest of Hispania
- 717: Second Arab siege of Constantinople
- 721: death of Ardo, last king of the Visigoths
- 718-722: Battle of Covadonga, establishment of the Kingdom of Asturias
- 726–737: Orso Ipato, Doge of Venice
- 730: First Iconoclastic Controversy
- 732: Battle of Tours/Poitiers
- 735: death of Bede, British historian
- 746: Blood court at Cannstatt
- 751: Pepin the Short founds the Carolingian dynasty
- 754: death of Saint Boniface
- 768–814: Charlemagne
- 778: Battle of Roncevaux Pass
- 782: Bloody Verdict of Verden
- 793: Viking raid on Lindisfarne; Viking Age begins
- 796–804: Alcuin initiates the Carolingian Renaissance
- 800: Coronation of Charlemagne as "emperor of the Romans"
- 815: Byzantine Iconoclasm
- 843: Treaty of Verdun
- 862: Rurikid Dynasty established
- 871–899: Alfred the Great
- 872–930: Harald I of Norway
- 874-930: Settlement of Iceland
- 882: Kievan Rus' established
- 911: Treaty of Saint-Clair-sur-Epte (Normandy)
- 955: Battle of Lechfeld
- 962: Otto I crowned Holy Roman Emperor
- 969: Kievan Rus' subjugates Khazars
- 987–996: Hugh Capet
- 988: Christianization of Kievan Rus'
- 991: Battle of Maldon

== See also ==
- Early Christian Ireland
- Early medieval European dress
- Early medieval literature
- English medieval clothing
- Human history
- Indo-Sassanid
- Late antiquity
- Medieval demography
- Medieval History of Africa
- Turkic expansion
