= Santi Gervasio e Protasio, Pavia =

Church building in Pavia, Italy

Santi Gervasio e Protasio
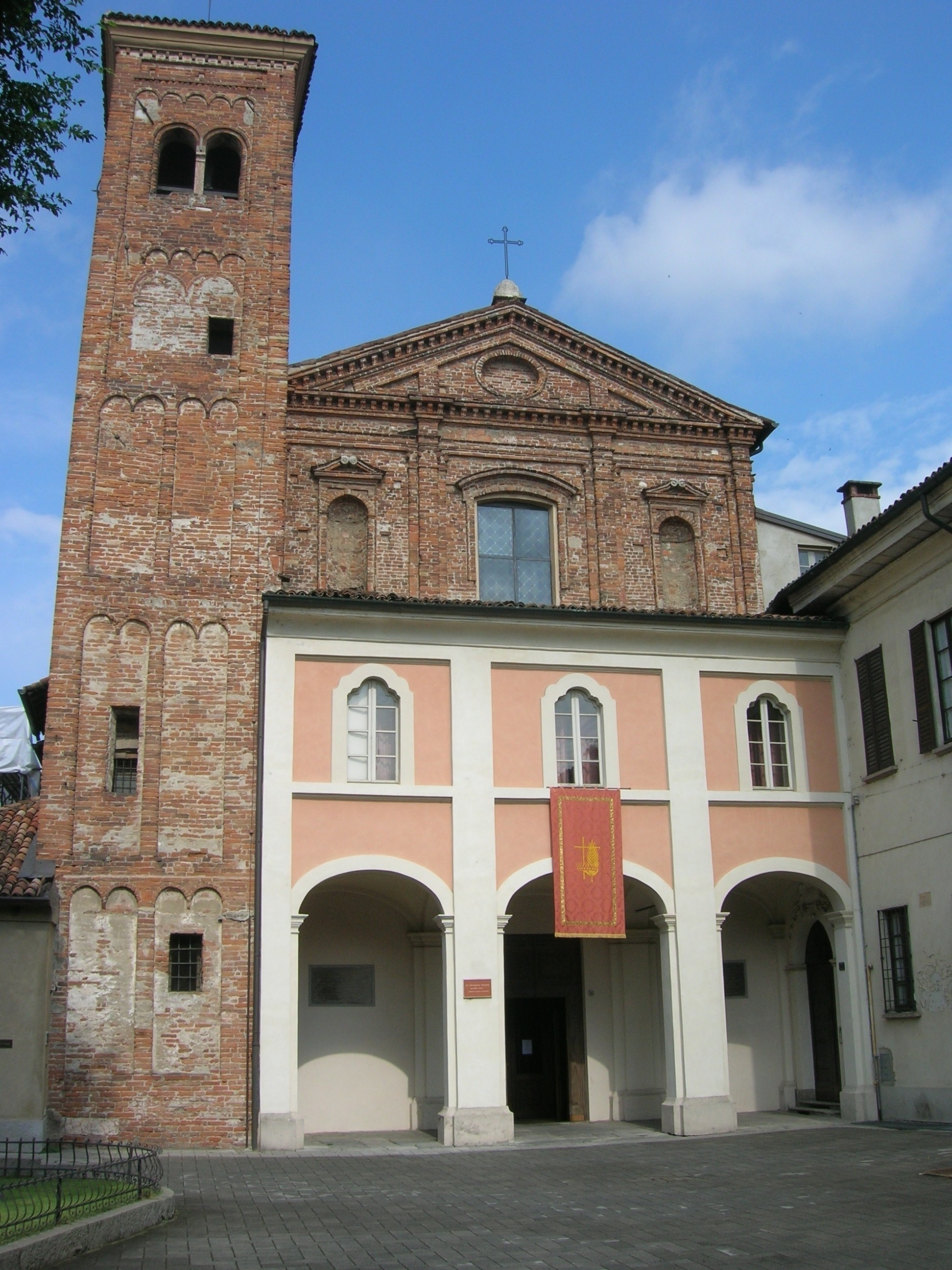

Religion
- Affiliation: Catholic
- Province: Pavia
- Year consecrated: IV century
- Status: Active

Location
- Location: Pavia, Italy
- Interactive map of Santi Gervasio e Protasio
- Coordinates: 45°11′04.56″N 9°9′34.27″E

Architecture
- Type: Church
- Completed: 18th Century

The Church of Santi Gervasio e Protasio is a church in Pavia, in Lombardy.

== History ==
According to tradition, the church of Santi Gervasio and Protasio is considered the oldest in Pavia and was certainly built in the early Christian age in a suburban necropolis of the Roman age. The church was dedicated to the two Milanese martyr saints Gervasius and Protasius, whose relics were found in 386 by Bishop Ambrose of Milan, and a part of which was brought to Pavia by Bishop Juventius of Pavia. In 1949 archaeological investigations carried out in the square in front of the church brought to light some structures of the early Christian basilica dating back to the decades between the fifth and sixth centuries, and in particular some portions of the apse. The first bishop of Pavia, Saint Syrus (later transferred to the cathedral), and the second, Saint Pompeus (lived 4th century) were also buried in the original building. The Lombard kings Cleph and Authari were buried in the church. In 1085 the church was entrusted to the Benedictines. In 1534 a part of the monastery's structures was handed over to Gerolamo Emiliani, who assigned them to the assistance of orphans, while a few years later, in 1542, the church passed to the Franciscans. Between 1712 and 1718, they subjected the building to radical interventions, the most important of which was the overturning of the building's entrance, with the consequent demolition of the Romanesque façade, which was replaced by the new apse, while, instead of the original, the new facade was built. In 1751 the parish had 1000 people. The convent was suppressed in 1782 by decree of Emperor Joseph II and the church was transformed into a parish.

== Architecture ==
Of the original Early Christian building, almost nothing remains on the surface except some walls of the bell tower, while of the Romanesque church, in addition to the bell tower (dating back to the 11th century), also portions of the wall remain, crowned by hanging arches along the sides of the building.

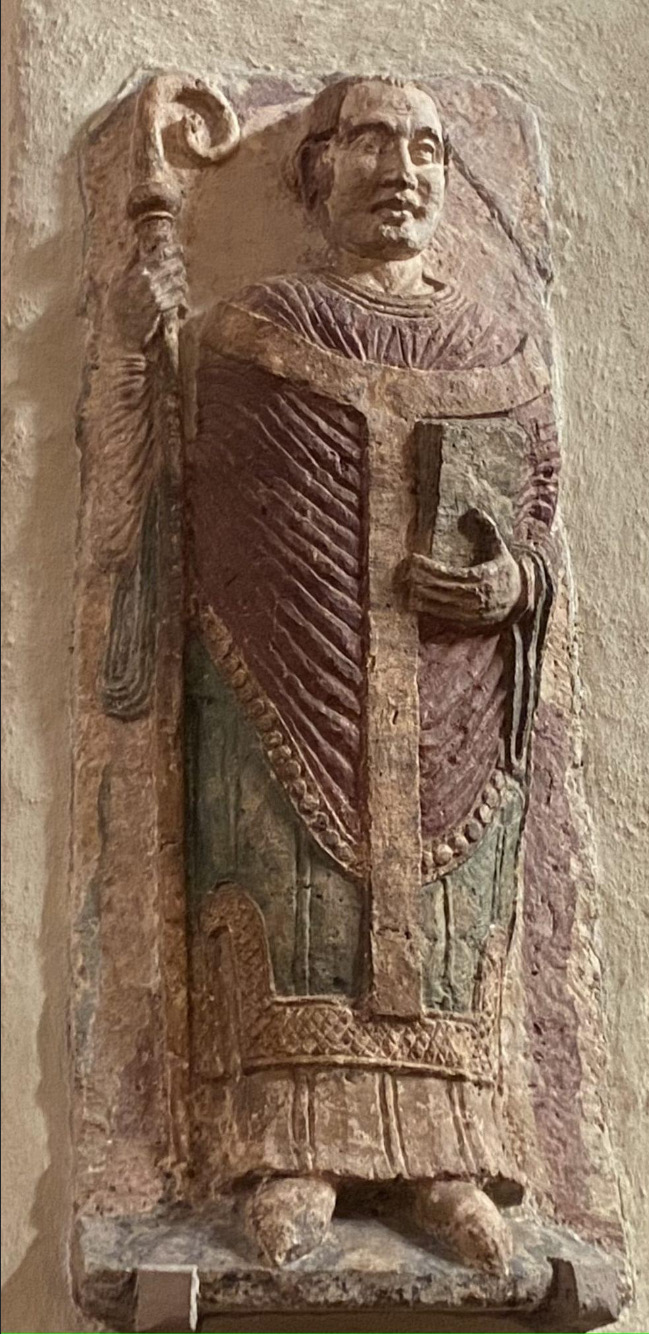
Bas-relief depicting Saint Syrus, 12th century.

Above the atrium of the portico, three windows overlook the internal space of the counter-façade which houses the organ.The eighteenth-century facade, not completed, is very simple and has a small portico with three lights and ends with an unplastered tympanum, tripartite by pilasters.The interior, according to the dictates of the Council of Trent, has a single hall covered by a barrel vault with six side chapels, three on each side.

The first chapel on the left is dedicated to the crucified Saints Ten thousand martyrs. Under the altar in 2002 the relic of San Gunifortus (originally from Scotland and martyred in Milan at the time of Emperor Maximian) was placed, a relic that had already been present in the church since 1790 when it was transported from the church Santa Maria Gualtieri. Due to the modalities of his martyrdom, through numerous arrows the saint was highly revered in the past as a protector against the plague.

The second chapel on the left (chapel of saint Syrus) houses the baptistery. During some archaeological investigations carried out inside the chapel in 1875, the original granite sarcophagus was found in which the body of Saint Syrus was placed in the 4th century. In the chapel there is a 12th-century bas-relief depicting the saint.

The third chapel on the left was dedicated to Saint Anthony of Padua and belonged to the noble Botta Adorno family. The chapel houses the tomb of the high Habsburg official Antoniotto Botta Adorno.
