= Rule of the Dukes =

574/5–584/5 interregnum in Italy

The Rule of the Dukes was an interregnum in the Lombard Kingdom of Italy (574/5–584/5) during which part of Italy was ruled by the Lombard dukes of the old Roman provinces and urban centres. The interregnum is said to have lasted a decade according to Paul the Deacon, but all other sources—the Fredegarii Chronicon, the Origo Gentis Langobardorum, the Chronicon Gothanum, and the Copenhagen continuator of Prosper Tiro—accord it twelve years.

== Description by Paul the Deacon ==
Here is how Paul describes the dukes' rule:

After his death the Langobards had no king for ten years but were under dukes, and each one of the dukes held possession of his own city, Zaban of Ticinum, Wallari of Bergamus, Alichis of Brexia, Euin of Tridentum, Gisulf of Forum Julii. But there were thirty other dukes besides these in their own cities. In these days many of the noble Romans were killed from love of gain, and the remainder were divided among their "guests" and made tributaries, that they should pay the third part of their products to the Langobards. By these dukes of the Langobards in the seventh year from the coming of Alboin and of his whole people, the churches were despoiled, the priests killed, the cities overthrown, the people who had grown up like crops annihilated, and besides those regions which Alboin had taken, the greater part of Italy was seized and subjugated by the Langobards.

== Origo Gentis Langobardorum ==
The Origo gives a shorter version of the same events:

The rest of the Langobards set over themselves a king named, Cleph, of the stock of Beleos, and Cleph reigned two years and died. And the dukes of the Langobards administered justice for twelve years and after these things they set up over themselves a king named Autari the son of Cleph. And Autari took as his wife Theudelenda, a daughter of Garipald and of Walderada from Bavaria.

== Political context ==
The Lombards had entered the Italian Peninsula in 568 under Alboin. Under Alboin's successor, Cleph, they continued to expand at the expense of the Byzantines. Cleph's reign was short and his rule hard. Upon his death, the Lombards did not elect another leader-king, leaving the territorial dukes the highest authorities in Lombard territories. According to Fredegar, they were forced to pay tribute to the Franks, and this lasted until the accession of Adaloald.

The dukes were unable to organise themselves under a single leader capable of continuing their successes against the Byzantines. When they invaded Frankish Provence (584/5), the Frankish kings Guntram and Childebert II counter-invaded northern Italy, took Trent, and opened negotiations with the emperor Tiberius II, sovereign of the hard-pressed exarchate of Ravenna. Finally, tired of disunion, fearing a pincer action from a Byzantine–Frankish alliance, and lacking the leadership necessary to withstand combined military forces, the dukes elected Authari as king. They ceded to him the old capital of Pavia and half of their ducal demesnes, though the fidelity to their oath with which this last promise was carried out is suspect. With the election of a king and the payment of tribute, the last Frankish troops still in Italy left.

== List of dukes ==
Among the known reigning dukes of the times were:

- Zotto, duke of Benevento
- Vallari, duke of Bergamo
- Alagis I, duke of Brescia
- Gisulf I, duke of Friuli
- Zaban, duke of Pavia
- Faroald I, duke of Spoleto
- Euin, duke of Trent
- Aimone, duke of Turin

== Sources ==
- Everett, Nicholas. Literacy in Lombard Italy, c. 568–774. Cambridge: Cambridge University Press, 2003.
- Oman, Charles. The Dark Ages, 476–918. London: Rivingtons, 1914.
- Paul the Deacon; Foulke, William Dudley, ed. Historia Langobardorum. Philadelphia: University of Pennsylvania, 1907.

| Preceded by Cleph | Rule of the Lombards; 574 – 584 | Succeeded by Authari |
