= Cleph =

King of the Lombards from 572 to 574

- King of the Lombards
- Reign: 572–574
- Predecessor: Alboin
- Successor: Authari (after 10 years of regency)
- Died: 574
- Issue: Authari two daughters

Cleph (also spelled Clef, Clepho, or Kleph) was king of the Lombards from 572 to 574.

== Biography ==
He succeeded Alboin, though he was not related to him by blood. Cleph was regarded as a violent and fearsome figure by the Romans and Byzantines, who were still attempting to maintain their hold on the Italian Peninsula. During his brief reign, he completed the Lombard conquest of Tuscany and brought their dominion to the gates of Ravenna, thereby extending Lombard control over nearly all of Northern Italy.

Cleph was assassinated after eighteen months in power by a young guard—a slave whom he had mistreated. His death marked the beginning of a ten-year interregnum, known as the Rule of the Dukes, during which authority was held by the territorial dukes. His son, Authari, ascended the throne in 585.

He was buried in the Church of Santi Gervasio e Protasio in Pavia.

== Notes ==
Regnal titles
Preceded by Alboin	King of the Lombards; 572–574	Vacant Rule of the Dukes Title next held by Authari
