= Shami Ghosh =

Indian-born historian

- Born: India

Academic background
- Education: King's College London; University of Toronto

Academic work
- Discipline: History
- Sub-discipline: Medieval studies
- Institutions: University of Toronto
- Main interests: Germanic-speaking Europe; Marxist history
- Notable works: Writing The Barbarian Past (2015)

Shami Ghosh is an Indian-born historian who is Associate Professor at the Centre for Medieval Studies and Department of History at the University of Toronto. He researches Marxist history and the history of Germanic-speaking Europe.

== Biography ==
Shami Ghosh was born in India. He received his BA (2003) in German at King's College London in 2003, his MA (2005) and PhD (2010) in Medieval Studies from the University of Toronto, and his LMS (2016) from the Pontifical Institute of Mediaeval Studies. Since 2016, Ghosh is Associate Professor at the Centre for Medieval Studies and Department of History at the University of Toronto.

== Theories ==
The research of Ghosh centers on Marxist history and the history of Germanic-speaking Europe. He has published the monographs Kings' Sagas and Norwegian History (2011) and Writing The Barbarian Past (2015). In the latter monograph, Ghosh argues that the only thing early Germanic peoples had in common was speaking Germanic languages, but that these linguistic similarities are insignificant. He denies that early Germanic peoples shared a common culture or identity, and believes that they only shared cultural similarities because mutual intelligibility facilitated cultural exchanges between them. Ghosh advocates replacing the term "Germanic" with the term "barbarian".

== Selected works ==
- Kings’ Sagas and Norwegian History, 2011
- Writing the Barbarian Past: Studies in Early Medieval Historical Narrative, Brill’s Series on the Early Middle Ages, 24 (Leiden: Brill, 2016)

== Sources ==
- Cronan, Dennis (2017). "Shami Ghosh, Writing the Barbarian Past". Speculum. 92 (3). University of Chicago Press: 825–826. doi:10.1086/692443.
- Neidorf, Leonard (2018). "Writing the Barbarian Past: Studies in Early Medieval Historical Narrative, by Shami Ghosh". ANQ. 30 (4). University of Kentucky: 275–276. doi:10.1080/0895769X.2017.1314213. S2CID 164263378.
