= Lombards =

Historical ethnic group of the Italian Peninsula of Germanic origin

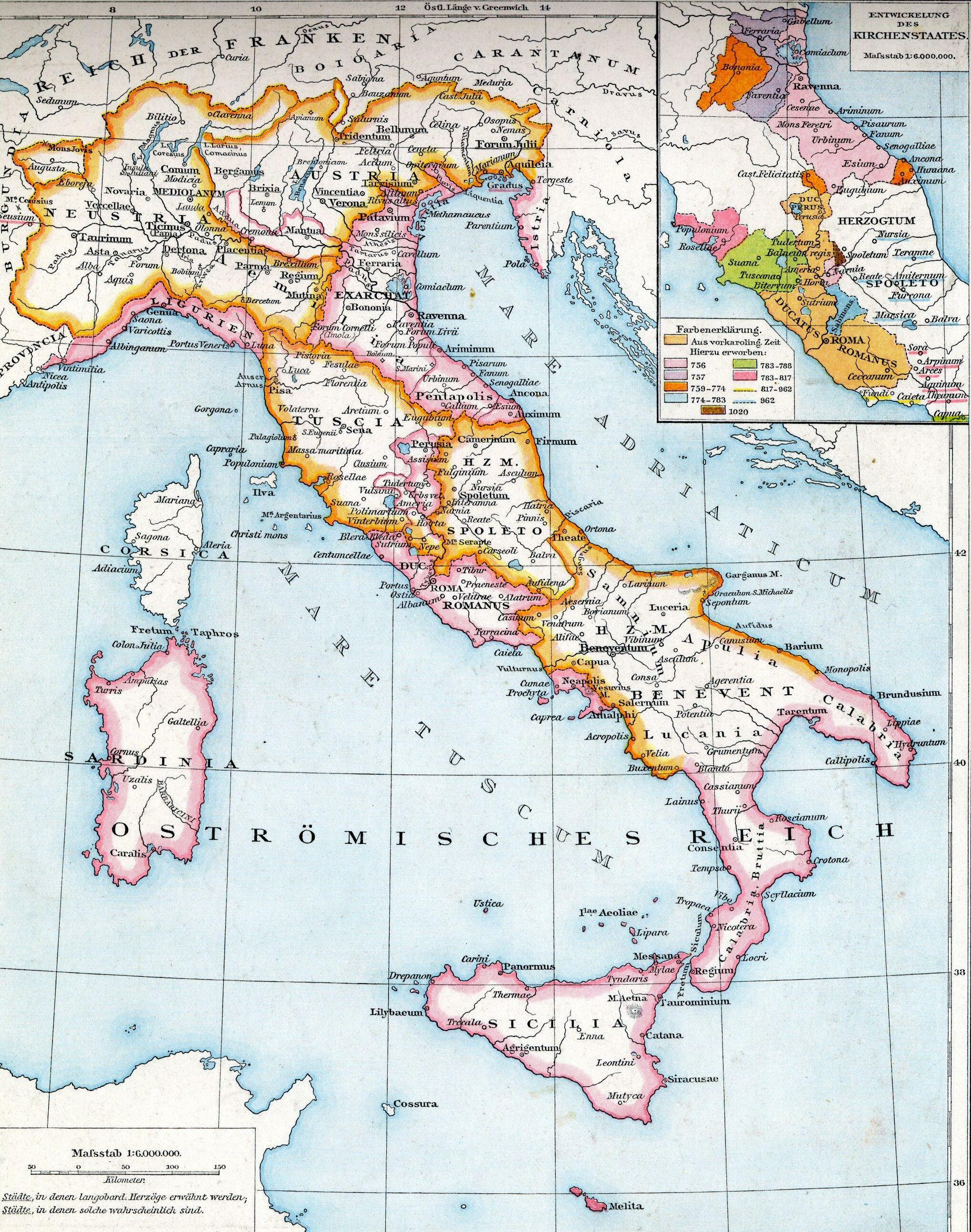
Lombard possessions in Italy: the Lombard Kingdom (Neustria, Austria and Tuscia) and the Lombard Duchies of Spoleto and Benevento

The Lombards, Longobards or Langobards (Latin: Langobardi) were a Germanic people who conquered most of the Italian Peninsula between 568 and 774 AD. They had previously settled in the Middle Danube in the 5th century, near what is now Austria, Slovenia and Hungary. Still earlier they lived further north, near present day Hamburg. Roman-era historians in the 1st and 2nd centuries AD mention the Lombards as one of the Suebian peoples, and report them living on the Lower Elbe in the early 1st century. Their legacy is apparent in Lombardy, northern Italy, the region deriving its name from them.

Apart from a single mention in the Cosmographia of Julius Honorius, there are no contemporary accounts of the Lombards in the 3rd or 4th century. They reappear in historical records living near the Danube river in the late 5th century. Legendary accounts of the Lombard migration are found in several early medieval texts, the oldest being the Origo Gentis Langobardorum (Origin of the Lombard People). There are two other notable later adaptions, the Chronicon Gothanum and the more scholarly History of the Lombards by Paul the Deacon, written between 787 and 796 AD, which contain more information. All three describe the Lombards as a people who moved to the Danube from somewhere near the North Sea. The details, however, differ until they enter "Rugiland" soon after Odoacer's defeat in 487/488 AD of the Rugii, who had a kingdom near what is now Vienna.

In the Danube region, the Lombards came into conflict with other barbarian kingdoms, starting with the Heruls, neighbours of the Rugii, and culminating with their defeat of the Gepids. The Lombard king Audoin settled his people further south in Pannonia, in modern-day Hungary, and defeated the Gepid leader Thurisind in 551 or 552 AD. Audoin's successor Alboin eventually destroyed the Gepid kingdom in 567 AD. Near Szólád, archaeologists have unearthed burial sites of Lombard men and women being buried together as families, unusual among Germanic peoples at the time.

Following Alboin's victory over the Gepids, he led his people into northeastern Italy, which had become severely depopulated and devastated by the long Gothic War (535–554) between the Byzantine Empire and the Ostrogothic Kingdom. The Lombards were joined by numerous Saxons, Suebi, Sarmatians, Heruls, Gepids, Bulgars, Thuringians and Ostrogoths, and their invasion of Italy was almost unopposed. By late 569 AD, they had conquered all of northern Italy and the principal cities north of the Po River except Pavia, which fell in 572 AD. At the same time, they occupied areas in central and southern Italy. They established a Lombard Kingdom in north and central Italy, which reached its zenith under the 8th century ruler Liutprand. In 774 AD, the kingdom was conquered by the Frankish king Charlemagne and integrated into the Frankish Empire. Lombard nobles, however, continued to rule the southern parts of the Italian Peninsula well into the 11th century, when they were conquered by the Normans and came under the County of Sicily.

== Name ==
The classical Latin and Greek forms of the name (Latin: Langobardi and Ancient Greek: Λαγκόβαρδοι) were first recorded by Strabo and Velleius Paterculus.

The standard explanation derives the name from Proto-Germanic: *lang- "long" and *bard- "beard," meaning "the Long-beards". Isidore of Seville stated in the 7th century that it was commonly said that the Langobards got their name because they never cut their beards. The three surviving origin stories agree about the basic meaning. The Origo and the History of Paul the Deacon connect it to a trick played by the ancestors of the Langobards, when their women pretended to be men with beards. The Chronicon Gothanum, on the other hand, skips this episode and says the name of the Langobards simply arose "by the voice of the common people" (ad vulgorum vocem), because of their long and uncut beards. Scholars generally accept this "long-beard" interpretation as linguistically and semantically sound.

Other explanations exist, but have had less support, including deriving -bard- from a weapon (barta "axe") or treating it as a synonym for "fighters" parallel to the alternate ethnonym Winnili ("the fighters"). It is possible that Winnili was the name the tribe used internally, while Langobardi began as a name used by outsiders.

Later sources sometimes also used a rare shortened form Bardi. Place-names like Bardengau and Bardowick in northern Germany, near the first known homeland of the Langobardi, possibly preserve this same element. On the other hand, scholars have also noted that this type of Bard placename is common throughout northern Germany, and apparently associated with wet or muddy areas.

A modern theory suggests that the name "Langobard" comes from Langbarðr, a name of Odin. Priester states that when the Winnili changed their name to "Lombards", they also changed their old agricultural fertility cult to a cult of Odin, thus creating a conscious tribal tradition. Fröhlich inverts the order of events in Priester and states that with the Odin cult, the Lombards grew their beards in resemblance of the Odin of tradition and their new name reflected this.

== Legendary origins ==
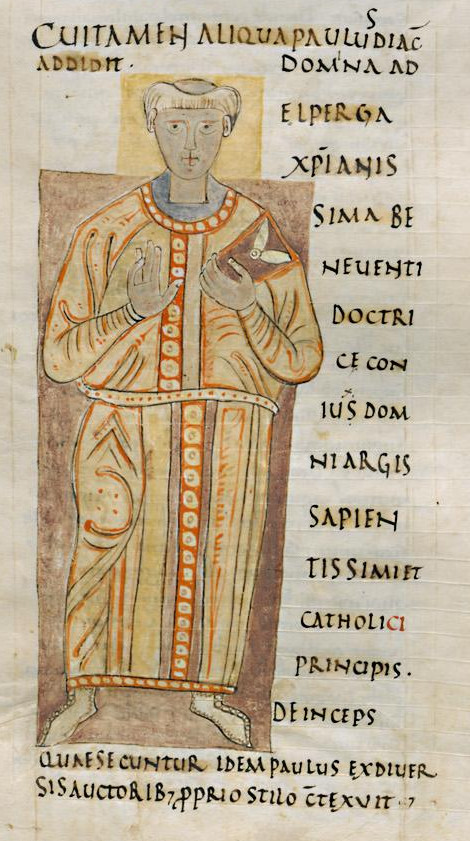
Paul the Deacon, historian of the Lombards, circa 720–799

All three of the legendary accounts state that the Langobards were originally called Winnili, and they begin with the Winnili being ruled by two brothers, Ibor and Aio (or Agio), whose mother and advisor is named Gambara. In 1970, Ernesto Sestan proposed that the Winnili might be the Vinoviloth, one of the tribes in Scandza (Scandinavia) mentioned by Jordanes in De origine actibusque Getarum in the 6th century CE.

The Origo and the History of Paul the Deacon have them first living on an island in the far north which the various manuscripts of these works spell in different ways: Scadan, Scandanan, Scadanan, or Scadinavia. Paul specifically mentions that he equated the island to "Scatinavia" mentioned by the Roman author Pliny the Elder. The Codex Gothanus, in contrast, says that the Lombards set out from a river called Vindilicus at the far edge of Gaul, then moved to "Scatenauga", which was a place on the lower Elbe, consistent with the location of the first century Langobardi described by Roman authors. The 7th-century writer Fredegar similarly says that the Langobardi came from Scathanavia, but only says this is "between the Danube and the Ocean" without calling it an island.

The account in Paul and the Origo appears to be an imitation of the 6th-century origin of the Goths written by Jordanes. The Codex Gothanus was written later than the other two records, but it appears to preserve some older material. The Vindilicus however appears to come from a mistaken reading of the earlier collection of etymologies by Isidore of Seville, who says it was a river where the Vandals originated, in a sentence which comes immediately after a comment about the etymology of the name of the Langobards. The Codex therefore apparently combined two distinct entries of Isidore.

The oldest of the three versions, the Origo, reports a war between the Winnili and the Vandals, who were attempting to force other peoples to pay tribute. In this version, the Winnili did not move from their home island until after they won this war, and after they changed their name to the Langobardi. The Origo gives no reason for leaving. A different sequence of events is given in Paul the Deacon's History, which says that a third of its inhabitants departed in search of new lands because of over-population and a low-lying coast. In this version the war with the Vandals happened in the new homeland called Scoringa, which is not mentioned in the other two sources. It was here that they also changed their tribal name according to Paul, but afterwards they decided to move again, this time because of famine. Scoringa was perhaps a coastal shoreline region.

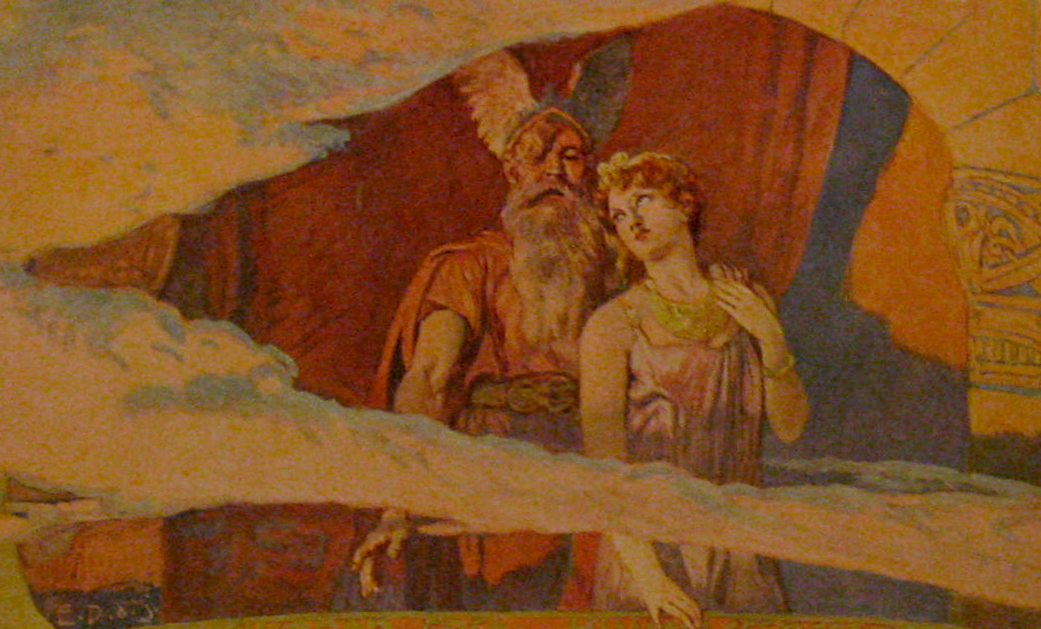
Wodan (Godan) and Frigg (Frea) looking out of a window in the heavens...

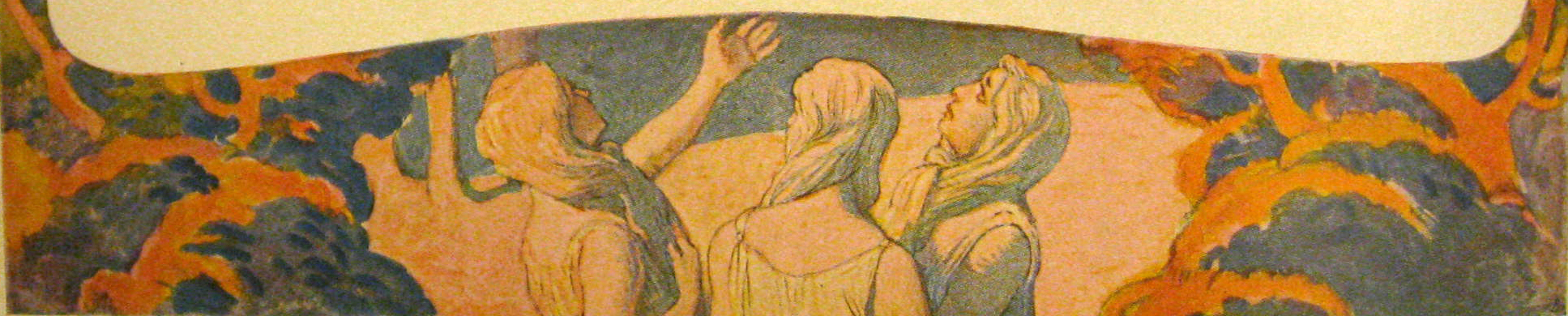
...and spotting the Lombard women with their long hair tied as to appear as beards

In the Vandal war reported by the Origo and History, the Winnili were young and brave and refused to pay tribute, saying that it "is better to maintain liberty by arms than to stain it by the payment of tribute". The Vandals prepared for war and consulted Godan (the god Odin), who answered that he would give victory to those whom he would see first at sunrise. The Winnili were fewer in number and Gambara sought help from Frea (the goddess Frigg), who advised that all Winnili women should tie their hair in front of their faces like beards and march in line with their husbands. At sunrise, Frea turned her husband's bed so that he was facing east, and woke him. So Godan spotted the Winnili first and asked, "Who are these long-beards?," and Frea replied, "My lord, thou hast given them the name, now give them also the victory." From that moment onwards, the Winnili were known as the Longbeards (Latinised as Langobardi, Italianised as Longobardi, and Anglicised as Langobards or Lombards).

When Paul the Deacon wrote the Historia between 787 and 796 he was a Catholic monk and devoted Christian. He thought the pagan stories of his people "silly" and "laughable". Paul explained that the name "Langobard" came from the length of their beards.

== History ==
=== First century: Lower Elbe ===
The first mention of the Lombards in a near contemporary record occurred between AD 9 and 16, by the Roman court historian Velleius Paterculus, who accompanied a Roman expedition as prefect of the cavalry. Paterculus says that under Tiberius the "power of the Langobardi was broken, a race (gens) surpassing even the Germans in savagery". Strabo, writing in about 20 AD, treats them as a branch of the Suebi, and indicates that they had previously lived west of the Elbe, but were now forced by Romans to stay on the eastern side.

Tacitus, writing in about 100 AD in his Germania, emphasised that the Langobardi were a distinctively small Suebian people, in terms of numbers, but surrounded by the most powerful peoples. They kept safe, according to him, "by daring the perils of war". Beyond the Langobardi were the Nerthus-worshipping tribes whose land of rivers and forest stretched to the sea and the remote parts of Germania.

In his Annals, Tacitus also noted the involvement of the Langobardi in the conflicts of the time. 9 AD when Arminius and his allies won the Battle of Teutoburg Forest, the Lombards and Semnones were part of the kingdom of Marobod, the King of the Marcomanni, who was allied with Rome. However, after the outbreak of war between Arminius and Marobod in 17 AD the Lombards and Semnones switched to the alliance of Arminius. They detested Marobod's title of king, and saw Arminius as a champion of freedom. In the battle the two sides eventually fought, Tacitus believed that the Cherusci and Langobardi were fighting for ancient renown or newly won freedom, while the other side for the increase of their dominion. Arminius died in 21 AD. In 47 AD, the Cherusci were assigned a new leader by Rome, Italicus, and this was controversial. Both his supporters and detractors appealed to neighbouring tribe. When he was eventually dethroned, the Langobardi restored him.

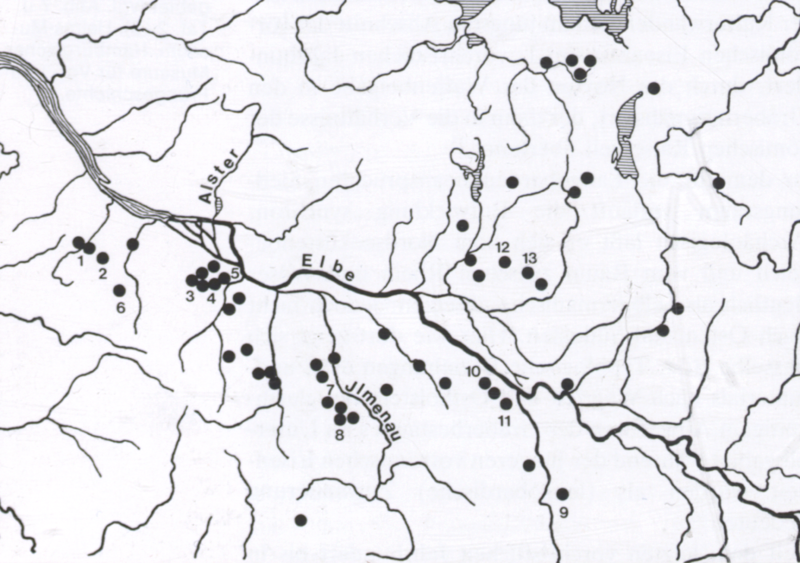
Distribution of Langobardic burial fields at the Lower Elbe Lands (according to W. Wegewitz)

In terms of archaeological evidence, the lands of the lower Elbe fall into the zone of the Jastorf Culture and became Elbe-Germanic, differing from the lands between Rhine, Weser, and the North Sea. Archaeologists have identified the probable core region of the Langobard settlements in zone south of Hamburg, separated from the coastal Chauci to the west by the moorlands of the Oste river, and to the south was the sparsely populated Lüneburg Heath. To the east their borders are hard to define, though they may have reached as far as the Ilmenau, or Drawehn, or even Höhbeck. On the north of the Elbe, cemeteries in the districts of Hagenow, Ludwigslust, and the fringe of the district of Schwerin up to Lake Schwerin are considered Langobardic. This whole area was continuously inhabited until the late early Roman period, when parts of the population began to shift. The burial sites are crematorial and are usually dated from the sixth century BC through the third century AD, so a settlement breakoff seems unlikely, although only a limited number of habitation sites have so far been investigated. The German archaeologist Willi Wegewitz observed a decline in archaeological finds during the first half of the 1st century BC, followed, from approximately 30 BC onwards, by the emergence of weapon burials. Wegewitz interprets these as evidence for the arrival of a new population, possibly the Lombards themselves. Archaeological finds show that the Lombards were an agricultural people.

=== Second century ===
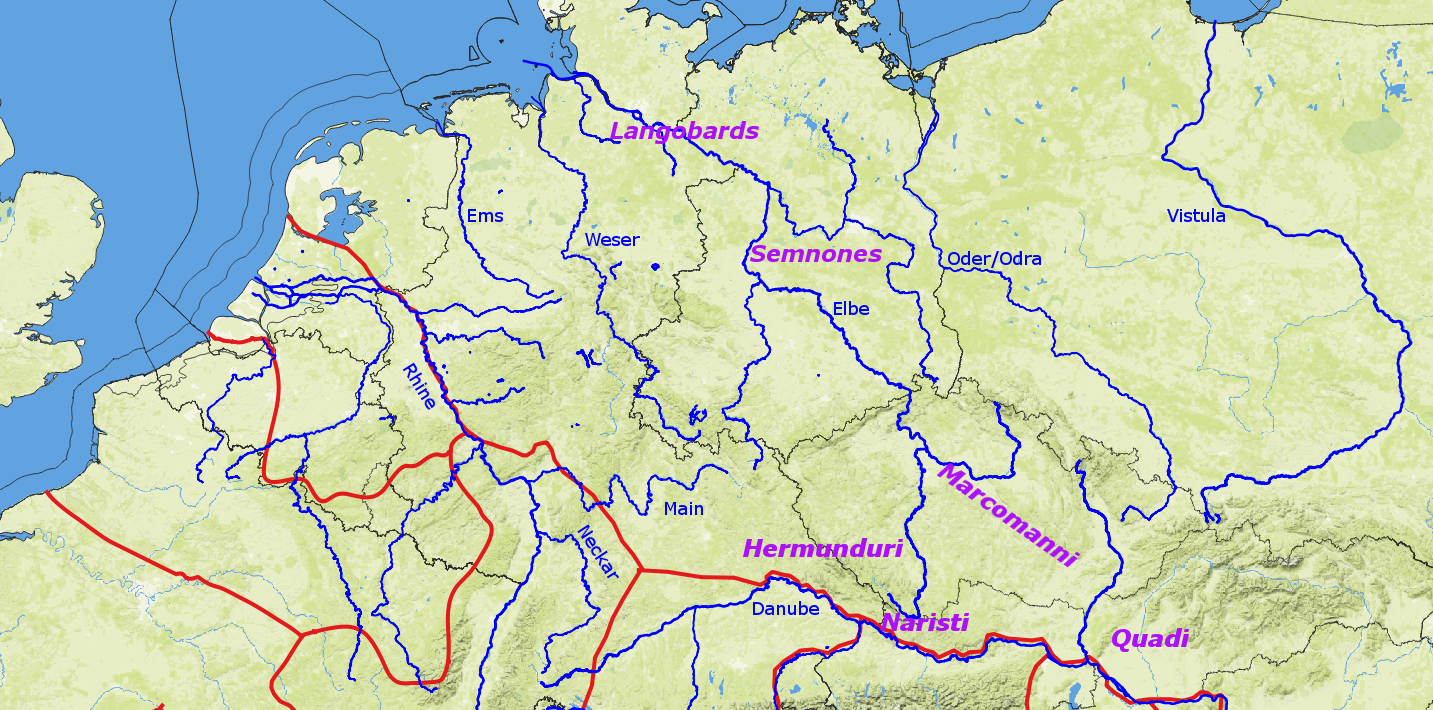
Approximate positions of some major Suebi peoples in the early 2nd century, in purple

In the mid-second century, surviving descriptions of Europe based on the work of geographer Claudius Ptolemy appears to describe the Langobardi in two distinct places, probably because the text is partly based upon several different earlier sources.

- Uniquely, the "Suebi Langobardi" (Σύηβοι οἱ Λαγγοβάρδοι); were described as living close to the Rhine: south of the Bructeri and Sugambri, north of the Tencteri. To their east stretching northwards to the central Elbe are the Suebi Angili. These locations for the Langobards and Angles are far to the west of any other classical reports. This has been interpreted as an editorial error by Gudmund Schütte, in his analysis of Ptolemy.
- The "Laccobardi" (Λακκοβάρδοι) were however placed between the Lower Weser and Lower Elbe, just inland of the Chauci on the coast, together with the Angrivarii and the Dulgubnii, all roughly in the locations where earlier Roman sources had placed them.

Difficult to evaluate, the Historia Langobardorum codicis Gothani mentions Patespruna in Saxony, probably Paderborn, as one of the places the early Langobardi lived.

Far to the south of the Lower Elbe, in 166 AD Cassius Dio reported that just before the Marcomannic Wars, 6,000 Lombards and Obii (sometimes thought to be Ubii) crossed the Danube and invaded Pannonia. The two tribes were defeated, but the non-Roman nations of the region were concerned about the possible Roman reaction. They sent Ballomar, King of the Marcomanni, as ambassador to Aelius Bassus, who was then administering Pannonia. Peace was made and the two tribes returned to their homes. However, this was seen as a foretaste of the great war which subsequently broke out.

From the second century onwards, many of the Germanic tribes recorded as active during the Principate started to unite into bigger tribal unions, such as the Franks, Alamanni, Bavarii, and Saxons. The Lombards are not mentioned at first, perhaps because they were not initially on the border of Rome, or perhaps because they were subjected to a larger tribal union, like the Saxons. It is, however, highly probable that, when the bulk of the Lombards migrated, a considerable part remained behind and afterwards became absorbed by the Saxon tribes in the Elbe region, while the emigrants alone retained the name of Lombards. However, the Historia Langobardorum codicis Gothani states that the Lombards were subjected by the Saxons around 300 but rose up against them under their first king, Agelmund, who ruled for 30 years. In the second half of the fourth century, the Lombards left their homes, probably due to bad harvests, and embarked on their migration.

=== Migration ===
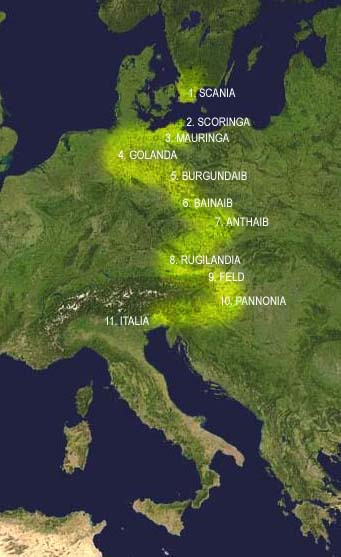
The legendary migration of the Lombards, according to Paul the Deacon—the early settlement areas, such as Scoringa or Mauringa, cannot be identified with certainty, despite numerous attempts.

The Cosmographia of Julius Honorius, is the only surviving source mentioning the Lombards between the 2nd and 6th century. This work cannot be used to give a precise location, but the cluster of names around it hints at the region between the Elbe, the Main, and the Upper Danube: Suebi gens | Langobardi gens | Iuthungi gens | Burgundiones gens | Armilausini gens | Marcomanni gens.

Apart from this, the only account of how the Langobards moved from the Lower Elbe to the Danube is found in semi-mythical accounts of the Origo Gentis Langobardorum, and the History of Paul the Deacon. The end of their journey was "Rugiland", where they arrived after 487 when Odoacer defeated the kingdom of the Rugii. They stopped in several places: Scoringa and Mauringa are only mentioned by Paul the Deacon; Golanda, Anthaib, Banthaib, and Vurgundaib (Burgundaib) are mentioned in both texts. According to the Ravenna Cosmography, Mauringa was the land east of the Elbe.

The crossing into Mauringa was very difficult. The Assipitti (possibly the Usipetes) denied them passage through their lands and a fight was arranged for the strongest man of each tribe. The Lombard was victorious, passage was granted, and the Lombards reached Mauringa.

The Lombards departed from Mauringa and reached Golanda. Scholar Ludwig Schmidt thinks this was further east, perhaps on the right bank of the Oder. Schmidt considers the name the equivalent of Gotland, meaning simply "good land". This theory is highly plausible; Paul the Deacon mentions the Lombards crossing a river, and they could have reached Rugiland from the Upper Oder area via the Moravian Gate.

Moving out of Golanda, the Lombards passed through Anthaib and Banthaib until they reached Vurgundaib, believed to be the old lands of the Burgundes. In Vurgundaib, the Lombards were stormed in camp by "Bulgars" (probably Huns) and were defeated; King Agelmund was killed and Laimicho was made king. He was in his youth and desired to avenge the slaughter of Agelmund. The Lombards themselves were probably made subjects of the Huns after the defeat but rose up and defeated them with great slaughter, gaining great booty and confidence as they "became bolder in undertaking the toils of war." The defeated Bulgars thus became subjects of the Lombards and later migrated to Italy together with their king, Alboin.

The Codex does not mention the places on the migration route described by Paul and the Origo (see below), but it surprisingly says that after living on the Elbe, the Langobardi lived in Saxony at Patespruna, which is probably intended to be Paderborn. The Codex says that the new tribal name was a result of the common people's voice (vulgorum vocem).

=== Middle Danube ===
When Odoacer defeated the Rugian kingdom which lay north of the Danube in Lower Austria in 488, according to Paul the Deacon and the Origo the Langobards moved under their king Claffo, the son of Gudeoc, and occupied the Rugian country, and they stayed there a number of years. After he was succeeded by his son Tato, the Langobards left and settled in a flat plain called "Feld" which modern scholars believe to be the Little Alföld region, now in Hungary, east of the Danube. Procopius reported that by the time Anastasius became emperor in 491 the Heruli under their king Rodulf had forced the Langobards and other surrounding peoples to pay tribute and no longer had anyone to attack in the area where they lived. According to him, only three years later, in 494, Rodulf was pressured by his followers to attack the Lombards, despite their treaties. According to Paul the Deacon one provocation was the murder of Rodulf's brother by a daughter of Tato. Rodulf died in the ensuing battle, and the Lombards conquered the kingdom of the Heruls in southern Moravia and Lower Austria. Modern date estimates for the destruction of the kingdom range from 493 to 511.

According to Paul the Deacon and the Origo, Tato was killed by his nephew Waccho. However, Tato’s rightful heir, Hildigis, managed to escape and, in 535, took refuge among the Slavs along with 3,000 members of his Lombard retinue, later becoming the commander of their cavalry. His men first attacked the Lombards, and then, around the 540s, rushed into Roman Thrace, thoroughly plundering the region and routing the Byzantine army in several engagements. According to the Origo, the Gepids already made war against the Langobards in response to this, and at this time Waccho also conquered a Suebian kingdom in the region. He married three times: Ranicunda, daughter of the king of the Thuringians; Austrigusa, daughter of the king of the Gepids, whose two daughters were married to Frankish kings; and Salinga the daughter of a Heruli king, possibly Rodulf, who was the mother of his successor Waltar. Waccho was also an ally of the Byzantine emperor Justinian, and the Italian Gothic king Vitiges (reigned 536 to 540) was unable to buy him over as an ally. Waltar or Waldar reigned seven years according to Paul and the Origo. Procopius described him as a king who died very young, after a short period in which Audoin, who subsequently took control of the kingdom, had actually administered the kingdom. According to the Origo Waltar was the last of his line, the Lethings. The Codex says Audouin was of the race of Gausus (Audoin ex genere fuit Gausus), and says his mother, named Menia, had been the wife of King Pissa.

Between 546 and 547, Audouin led the Langobards into Roman Pannonia, south and west of the Danube. In their new home, the Lombards were joined by Heruli, Suebi, and Goths, an integration that the Lombard king encouraged. They were able to make this resettlement because Emperor Justinian granted them a city in Noricum, strongholds in Pannonia, as well as other territory, and a large amount of money. According to Procopius, their new position was closer to the Gepids. In this period Justinian also allowed Heruli to settle near Belgrade (Singidunum) south of the Longobards within Roman Moesia Prima, and Procopius complained that these barbarian peoples raided Roman citizens, and that Langobards even forced Romans to move to their territory like slaves. The Gepids under their king Thurisind on their part had taken control of Sirmium, also in Pannonia, and south of the Danube, and between the Langobards and Heruli.

In 549 the Langobards and Gepids almost started a war, but they first went to Justinian, each arguing that their opponents were worse allies to Rome. The Langobards accused the Gepids of enslaving Romans, and of boasting that they controlled Roman Dacia. Justinian decided to take the Langobard side, while the Heruli joined the Gepids, despite another Heruli force having previously been recruited into the Roman military. After a Roman force moved to help the Langobards, and engaged with the pro-Gepid Heruli, the Gepids quickly made peace with the Langobards.

Probably one of the disputes between the two peoples was that they were protecting claimants to each other's kingdoms. The rightful heir to the Gepid kingdom was named Ustrigothus, and he had fled as a child to the Langobards after his father died. The Langobards had apparently continued to protect him. At the same time, the rightful heir of Tato named Hildigis had moved from exile among the Sclaveni to be with the Gepids during this conflict, in hopes of being restored to his kingdom. The Langobards now requested that he be surrendered to them. The Gepids refused, but asked him to find refuge elsewhere, and so he returned to the Sclaveni with his followers and some Gepids. Hildigis then went to join Totila and the Ostrogoths, bringing with him an army of no fewer than six thousand men. Upon his arrival in Venetia, he encountered some Romans commanded by Lazarus. He routed their forces and killed many of them. Hilgidis did not, however, join the Goths, but instead crossed back over the Danube River and retreated once more into the land of the Sclaveni. Later, with a force of 7,000 Slavs, Lombards and Gepids, he attacked and plundered Moesia, where they defeated the soldiers of the Byzantine Empire and advanced as far as Constantinople.

The following year, in 550, the fighting almost began again. Audouin and Thurisind gather large armies and confronted each other, but both armies panicked and fled the field, without realising that the other side had. The two sides agreed to a two-year truce.

With tensions unresolved, Thurisind soon made an alliance with the Kutrigurs who arrived with a large force before the Gepids were ready to fight. The Gepids therefore helped them cross into the empire and they devastated Moesia. Later the Thurisind made an agreement with the Sclavini, to be paid large amounts to ferry them across the Danube into Roman territory, but they then made a more comprehensive agreement of offence and defence with the Romans, hoping that this would protect them from Roman involvement in a war against the Langobards. However, Justinian already had another agreement with the Langobards, and when they called upon the Romans soon afterwards, the Romans sent forces.

In 552 the Langobards with a small amount of Roman support defeated the Gepids in a major battle. In the battle, Audoin's son, Alboin killed Thurisind's son, Turismod. According to Paul the Deacon, Alboin then asked to be adopted "in arms" by king Thurisind, thus ending the conflict between the two peoples for the time being.

Also in 552, the Byzantines, aided by a large contingent of Foederati, notably Lombards, Heruls and Bulgars, defeated the last Ostrogoths led by Teia in the Battle of Taginae. Unlike other foreign contingents, the Lombards were considered undisciplined and difficult to control, so they were quickly sent back home because “they kept setting fire to whatever buildings they chanced upon and violating by force the women who had taken refuge in the sanctuaries.”

In the meantime, Hildigis the heir of the Langobards had been welcomed in Byzantium by Justinian, and become the leader of a palace guard made up of Langobards, and living in Thrace. Aubouin requested his delivery but Justinian refused. Dissatisfied with his conditions however, Hildigis conspired to steal imperial horses and flee with his followers. He succeeded in reaching the Gepids, where Aubouin once again requested his delivery. The Gepid nobles were disgusted by the idea but Thurisind contacted Aubouin suggesting that they should both commit equal sins by delivering Ustrigothus. Realising that neither people wished to do so openly, an arrangement was found by which both Hildigis and Usitrgothis were killed secretly.

In approximately 560, Audoin was succeeded by his son Alboin, a young and energetic leader who defeated the neighbouring Gepidae and made them his subjects; in 566, he married Rosamund, daughter of the Gepid king Cunimund. In the same year, he made a pact with Khagan Bayan. Next year the Lombards and the Avars destroyed the Gepid kingdom in the Lombard–Gepid War, the allies halved the prize of war and the nomads settled in Transylvania. As a result of these victories, the Lombards came to dominate an ethnically diverse population in the Pannonian Basin, which included local Suebi, the remnants of the Hunnic-Alan population, and other East Germanic peoples. Further Elbe Germanic tribal groups from Bohemia, Moravia, and Lower Austria, joined the Lombards in their migration, thereby increasing their military strength.

=== Kingdom of the Lombards in Italy, 568–774 ===
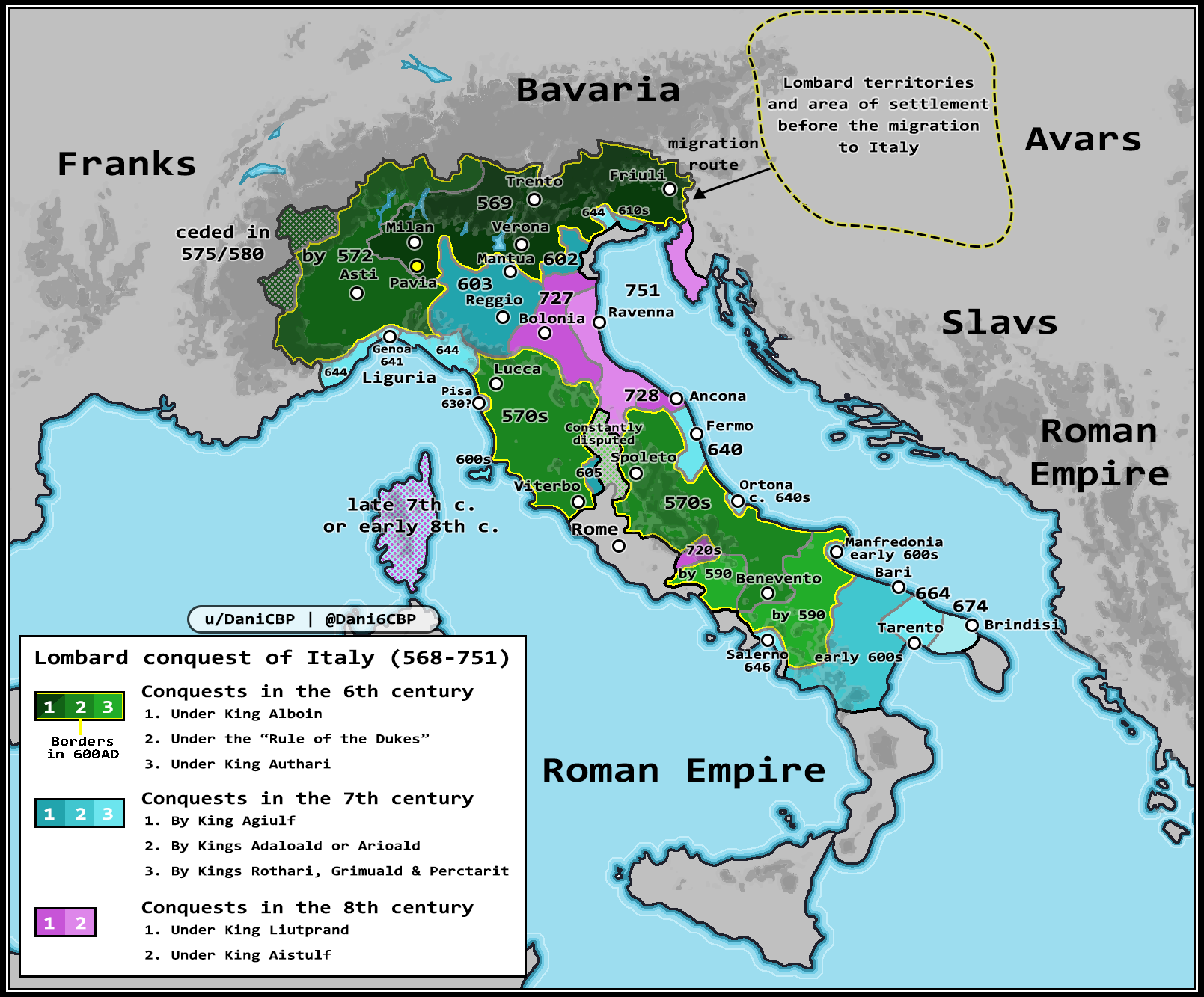
Phases of the conquest of Italy

In the spring of 568, Alboin, now fearing both the aggressive Avars and the relative poverty of the Carpathian Basin, led the migration of the Lombards into Italy in search of more profitable ventures, an undertaking he had planned for years. According to the History of the Lombards, "Then the Langobards, having left Pannonia, hastened to take possession of Italy with their wives and children and all their goods." The Avars agreed to shelter them, should they wish to return.

Various other peoples who either voluntarily joined or were subjects of King Alboin were also part of the migration.

Whence, even until today, we call the villages in which they dwell Gepidan, Bulgarian, Sarmatian, Pannonian, Suabian, Norican, or by other names of this kind."

At least 20,000 Saxon warriors, old allies of the Lombards, and their families joined them in their new migration. The territory left behind by the Lombards in Pannonia was subsequently settled by Slavs (with the help of their Avar overlords) in the last decades of the 6th century. It is possible that some of these Pannonian Slavs accompanied the Lombards to Italy in 568, although their participation cannot be established with certainty. Their presence in the southwestern part of the Carpathian Basin is archaeologically confirmed for the first half of the 6th century, a period during which the Lombards controlled the region.

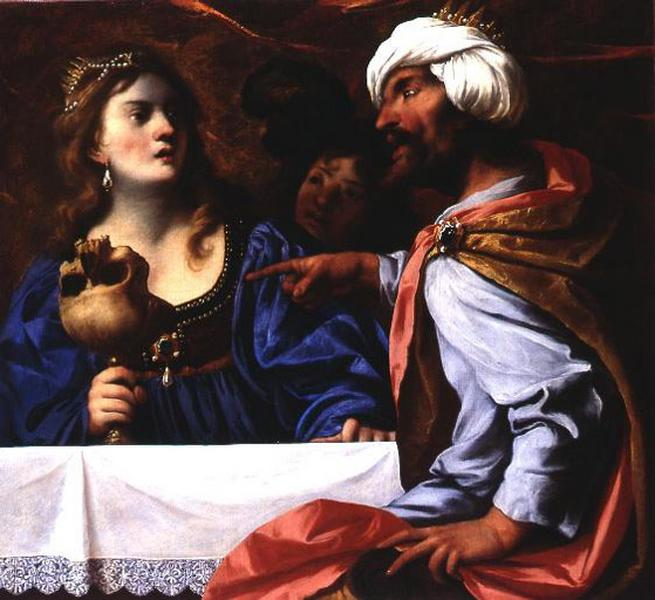
Rosamund forced to drink from the skull of her father by Pietro della Vecchia. According to Samu Szádeczky-Kardoss, the cup could be a gift from Bayan, as it was a nomad habit to make cups from the enemy's skulls.

The first important city to fall was Forum Iulii (Cividale del Friuli) in northeastern Italy, in 569. There, Alboin created the first Lombard duchy, which he entrusted to his nephew Gisulf. Soon Vicenza, Verona and Brescia fell into Germanic hands. In the summer of 569, the Lombards conquered the main Roman centre of northern Italy, Milan. The area was then recovering from the terrible Gothic Wars, and the small Byzantine army left for its defence could do almost nothing. Longinus, the Exarch sent to Italy by Emperor Justin II, could only defend coastal cities that could be supplied by the powerful Byzantine fleet. Pavia fell after a siege of three years, in 572, becoming the first capital city of the new Lombard kingdom of Italy.

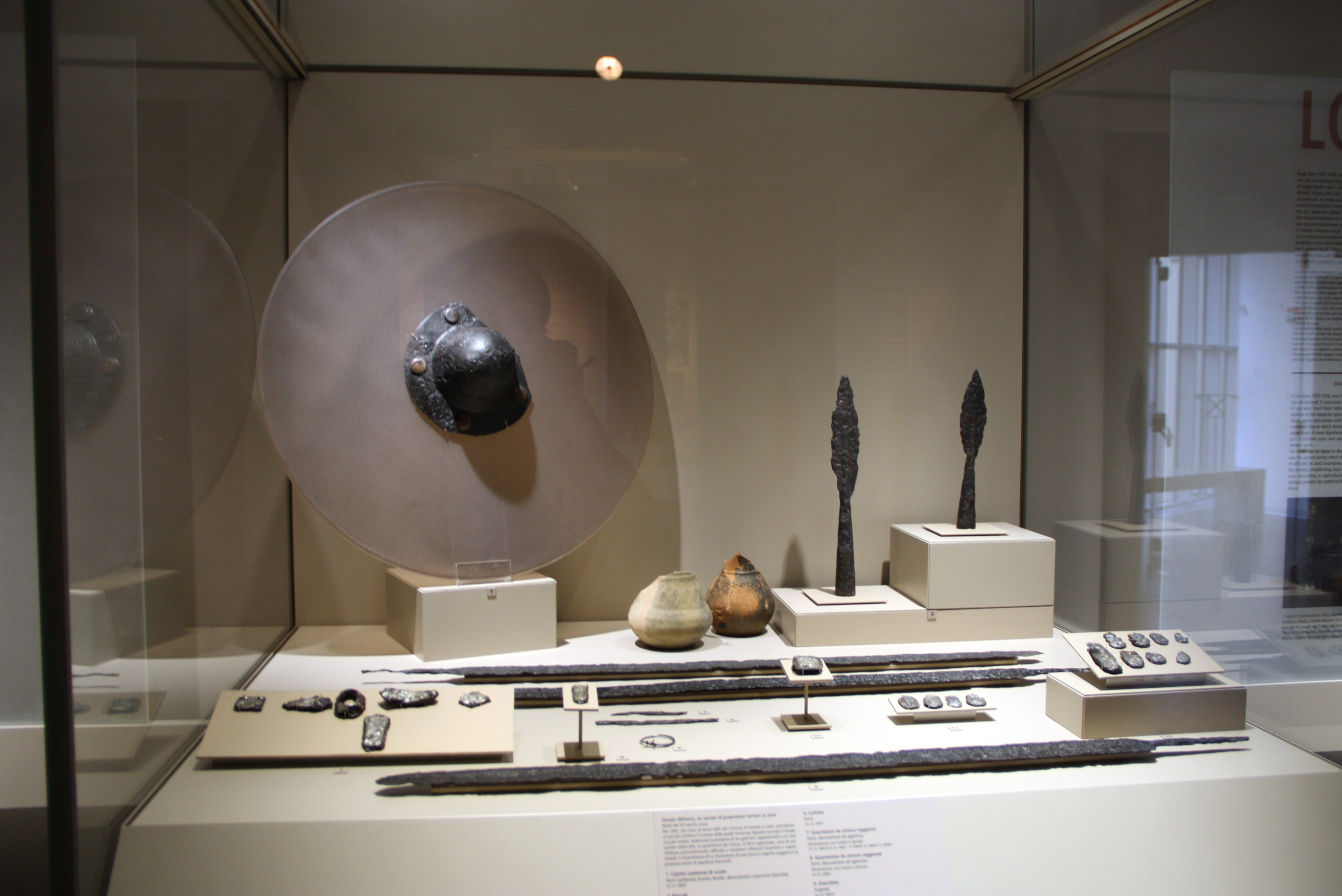
Lombard grave goods (sixth to seventh century), Milan, Lombardy

In the following years, the Lombards penetrated further south, conquering Tuscany and establishing two duchies, Spoleto and Benevento under Zotto, which soon became semi-independent and even outlasted the northern kingdom, surviving well into the twelfth century. Wherever they went, they were joined by the Ostrogothic population, which was allowed to live peacefully in Italy with their Rugian allies under Roman sovereignty. The Byzantines managed to retain control of the area of Ravenna and Rome, linked by a thin corridor running through Perugia.

When they entered Italy, some Lombards retained their native form of paganism, while some were Arian Christians. Hence they did not enjoy good relations with the Early Christian Church. Gradually, they adopted Roman or Romanised titles, names, and traditions, and partially converted to orthodoxy (in the seventh century), though not without a long series of religious and ethnic conflicts. By the time Paul the Deacon was writing, the Lombard language, dress and even hairstyles had nearly all disappeared in toto.

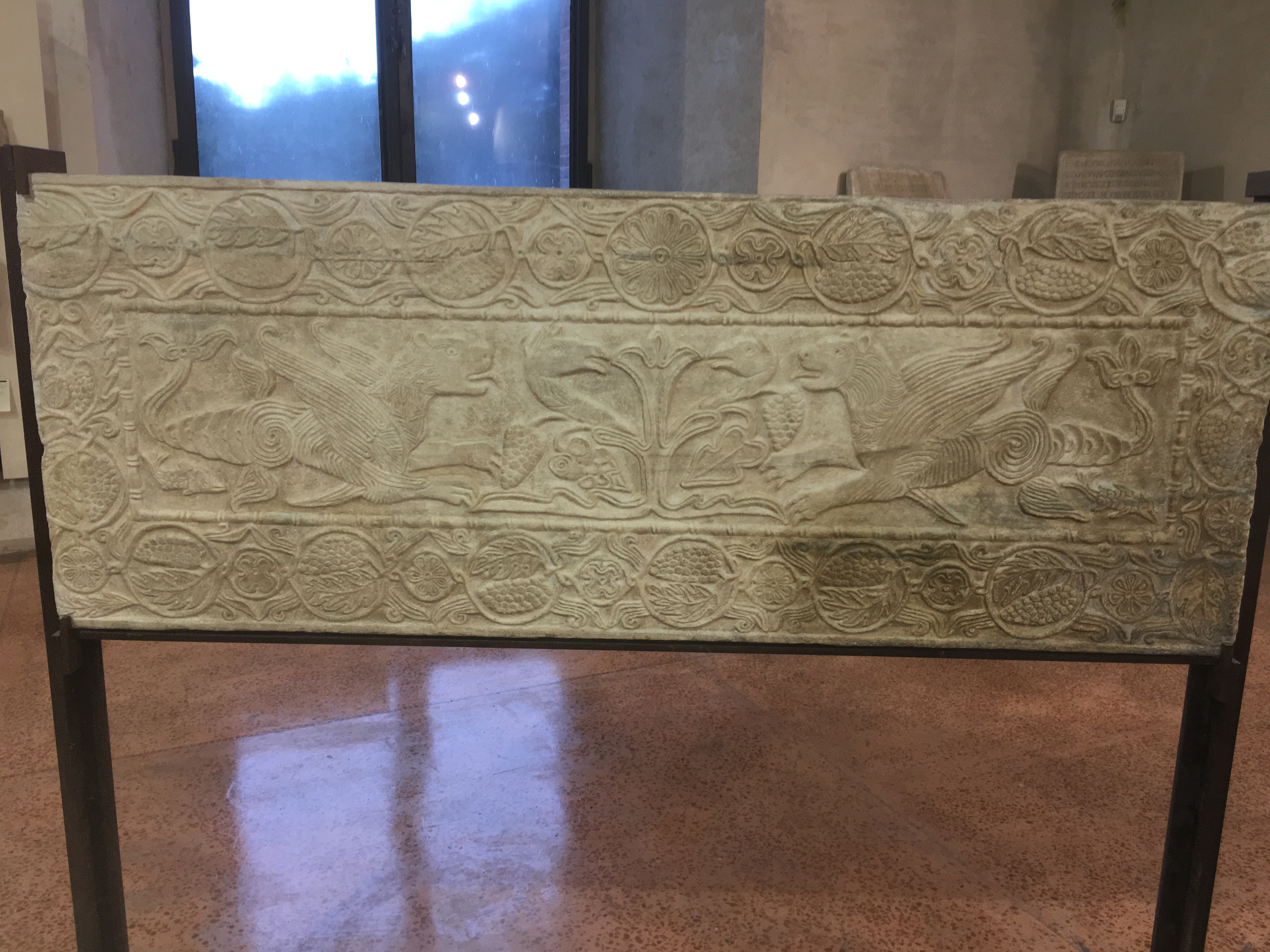
Plutei of Theodota, mid-eighth century, Civic Museums of Pavia.

The whole Lombard territory was divided into 36 duchies, whose leaders settled in the main cities. The king ruled over them and administered the land through emissaries called gastaldi. This subdivision, however, together with the independent indocility of the duchies, deprived the kingdom of unity, making it weak even when compared to the Byzantines, especially since these had begun to recover from the initial invasion. This weakness became even more evident when the Lombards had to face the increasing power of the Franks. In response, the kings tried to centralise power over time, but they definitively lost control over Spoleto and Benevento in the attempt.

==== Langobardia major ====
- Duchy of Friuli
- Duchy of Tridentum
- Duchy of Persiceta
- Duchy of Pavia
- Duchy of Tuscia

==== Langobardia minor ====
- Duchy of Spoleto and Duke of Spoleto
- Duchy of Benevento and List of dukes and princes of Benevento

==== Arian monarchy ====
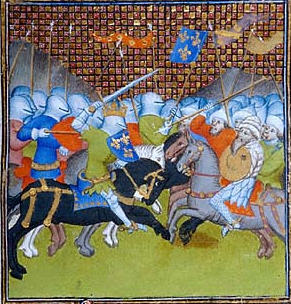
The Frankish Merovingian King Chlothar II in combat with the Lombards

In 572, Alboin was murdered in Verona in a plot led by his wife, Rosamund, who later fled to Ravenna. His successor, Cleph, was also assassinated, after a ruthless reign of 18 months. His death began an interregnum of years (the "Rule of the Dukes") during which the dukes did not elect any king, a period regarded as a time of violence and disorder. In 584, threatened by a Frankish invasion, the dukes elected Cleph's son, Authari, as king. In 589, he married Theodelinda, daughter of Garibald I of Bavaria, the Duke of Bavaria. The Catholic Theodelinda corresponded with Pope Gregory I and encouraged the conversion of the Lombards. In the meantime, Authari embarked on a policy of internal reconciliation and tried to reorganise royal administration. The dukes yielded half their estates for the maintenance of the king and his court in Pavia. In foreign affairs, Authari blocked an alliance between the Byzantines and the Franks.

Authari died in 590 and was succeeded by Agilulf, the duke of Turin, who also married Theodelinda in the same year. Agilulf fought successfully against the rebellious dukes of northern Italy, conquering Padua in 601, as well as Cremona and Mantua in 603 (with the aid of Slavic contingents sent by the Khagan of the Avars) and exacting a payment from the Exarch of Ravenna. Agilulf died in 616; Theodelinda reigned alone until 628 when she was succeeded by Adaloald. Arioald, the head of the Arian opposition who had married Theodelinda's daughter Gundeperga, later deposed Adaloald.

Arioald was succeeded by Rothari, who reigned from 636 to 652. He extended his dominions, conquering Liguria in 643 and the remaining part of the Byzantine territories of inner Veneto, including the Roman city of Opitergium (Oderzo). Rothari also issued the edict bearing his name, the Edictum Rothari, which established the laws and the customs of his people in Latin: the edict did not apply to the tributaries of the Lombards, who could retain their own laws. Rothari's son Rodoald succeeded him in 652, still very young, and was killed by his opponents.

At the death of King Aripert I in 661, the kingdom was split between his children Perctarit, who set his capital in Milan, and Godepert, who reigned from Pavia (Ticinum). Perctarit was overthrown by Grimoald, son of Gisulf, duke of Friuli and Benevento since 647. Perctarit fled to the Avars and then to the Franks. Grimoald regained control over the duchies, repelled the attempt of the Byzantine emperor Constans II to conquer southern Italy, and defeated the Franks. At Grimoald's death in 671 Perctarit returned and promoted tolerance between Arians and Catholics, but he could not subdue the rebel Alahis, duke of Trento, who was overcome only by his son, the philo-Catholic Cunincpert.

When the Slavs, together with the Avars, first invaded the Duchy of Friuli in 610, the region was heavily garrisoned by Lombard strongholds, linked to ancient Roman road crossings. The Lombards engaged in fierce battles with Slavs and Avars during these years: around 610–611, an Avar invasion devastated Friuli and resulted in the death of Duke Gisulf II and the capture of Cividale. Between 623 and 626, the Lombards attacked the Carantanians, and in 631 they won an important battle against the Alpine Slavs. Around 664, at the request of the Lombard king Grimoald, the Avars attacked Friuli and defeated and killed the rebellious duke Lupus of Friuli. The Slavs, meanwhile, made incursions into the Vipava Valley and Friuli, notably during the years 663–664.

==== Catholic monarchy ====
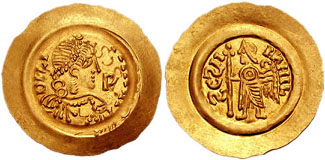
King Liutprand (712–744) "was a zealous Catholic, generous and a great founder of monasteries".

Religious strife and the Slavic raids remained a source of struggle in the following years. In 705, the Slavs inflicted a catastrophic defeat upon the Lombards of Friuli, thereby conquering the Gorizia Hills and Venetian Slovenia. A new ethnic boundary was established that has lasted for over 1200 years, up to the present day.

The Lombard reign began to recover only with Liutprand the Lombard (king from 712), son of Ansprand and successor of the brutal Aripert II. He managed to regain a certain control over Spoleto and Benevento, and, taking advantage of the disagreements between the Pope and Byzantium concerning the reverence of icons, he annexed the Exarchate of Ravenna and the duchy of Rome. He also helped the Frankish marshal Charles Martel drive back the Arabs. In 720, Duke Pemmo of Friuli defeated "an immense multitude of Slavs" in the Battle of Lauriana, when they tried to conquer the Friulian Plain. In 737, Ratchis, then Duke of Friuli and later King of the Lombards, led a military expedition into Carniola, described as the Sclavorum patria (homeland of the Slavs), killing many Slavs and plundering the region. Liutprand's successor Aistulf conquered Ravenna for the Lombards for the first time but had to relinquish it when he was subsequently defeated by the king of the Franks, Pippin III, who was called by the Pope.

After the death of Aistulf, Ratchis attempted to become king of Lombardy, but he was deposed by Desiderius, duke of Tuscany, the last Lombard to rule as king. King Desiderius managed to take Ravenna definitively, ending the Byzantine presence in northern Italy. He decided to reopen struggles against the Pope, who was supporting the dukes of Spoleto and Benevento against him, and entered Rome in 772, the first Lombard king to do so. But when Pope Hadrian I called for help from the powerful Frankish king Charlemagne, Desiderius was defeated at Susa and besieged in Pavia, while his son Adelchis was forced to open the gates of Verona to Frankish troops. Desiderius surrendered in 774, and Charlemagne, in an utterly novel decision, took the title "King of the Lombards". Before then the Germanic kingdoms had frequently conquered each other, but none had adopted the title of King of another people. Charlemagne took part of the Lombard territory to create the Papal States.

The Lombardy region in Italy, which includes the cities of Brescia, Bergamo, Milan, and the old capital Pavia, is a reminder of the presence of the Lombards.

=== Later history ===
==== Falling to the Franks and the Duchy of Benevento, 774–849 ====
Lombard Duchy of Benevento in the eighth century

Though the kingdom centred on Pavia in the north fell to Charlemagne and the Franks in 774, the Lombard-controlled territory to the south of the Papal States was never subjugated by Charlemagne or his descendants. In 774, Duke Arechis II of Benevento, whose duchy had only nominally been under royal authority, though certain kings had been effective at making their power known in the south, claimed that Benevento was the successor state of the kingdom. He tried to turn Benevento into a secundum Ticinum: a second Pavia. He tried to claim the kingship, but with no support and no chance of a coronation in Pavia.

Charlemagne came down with an army, and his son Louis the Pious sent men, to force the Beneventan duke to submit, but his submission and promises were never kept and Arechis and his successors were de facto independent. The Beneventan dukes took the title prínceps (prince) instead of that of king.

The Lombards of southern Italy were thereafter in the anomalous position of holding land claimed by two empires: the Carolingian Empire to the north and west and the Byzantine Empire to the east. They typically made pledges and promises of tribute to the Carolingians, but effectively remained outside Frankish control. Benevento meanwhile grew to its greatest extent yet when it imposed a tribute on the Duchy of Naples, which was tenuously loyal to Byzantium and even conquered the Neapolitan city of Amalfi in 838. At one point in the reign of Sicard, Lombard control covered most of southern Italy save the very south of Apulia and Calabria and Naples, with its nominally attached cities. It was during the ninth century that a strong Lombard presence became entrenched in formerly Greek Apulia. However, Sicard had opened up the south to the invasive actions of the Saracens in his war with Andrew II of Naples and when he was assassinated in 839, Amalfi declared independence and two factions fought for power in Benevento, crippling the principality and making it susceptible to external enemies.

The civil war lasted ten years and ended with a peace treaty imposed in 849 by Emperor Louis II, the only Frankish king to exercise actual sovereignty over the Lombard states. The treaty divided the kingdom into two states: the Principality of Benevento and the Principality of Salerno, with its capital at Salerno on the Tyrrhenian Sea.

==== Southern Italy and the Arabs, 836–915 ====
Andrew II of Naples hired Islamic mercenaries and formed a Muslim-Christian alliance for his war with Sicard of Benevento in 836; Sicard responded with other Muslim mercenaries. The Saracens initially concentrated their attacks on Sicily and Byzantine Italy, but soon Radelchis I of Benevento called in more mercenaries, who destroyed Capua in 841. Landulf the Old founded the present-day Capua, "New Capua", on a nearby hill. In general, the Lombard princes were less inclined to ally with the Saracens than with their Greek neighbours of Amalfi, Gaeta, Naples, and Sorrento. Guaifer of Salerno, however, briefly put himself under Muslim suzerainty.

In 847 a large Muslim force seized Bari, until then a Lombard gastaldate under the control of Pandenulf. Saracen incursions proceeded northwards until Adelchis of Benevento sought the help of his suzerain, Louis II, who allied with the Byzantine emperor Basil I to expel the Arabs from Bari in 869. An Arab landing force was defeated by the emperor in 871. Adelchis and Louis remained at war until the death of Louis in 875. Adelchis regarded himself as the true successor of the Lombard kings, and in that capacity he amended the Edictum Rothari, the last Lombard ruler to do so.

After the death of Louis, Landulf II of Capua briefly flirted with a Saracen alliance, but Pope John VIII convinced him to break it off. Guaimar I of Salerno fought the Saracens with Byzantine troops. Throughout this period the Lombard princes swung in allegiance from one party to another. Finally, towards 915, Pope John X managed to unite the Christian princes of southern Italy against the Saracen establishments on the Garigliano river. The Saracens were ousted from Italy in the Battle of the Garigliano in 915.

==== Lombard principalities in the tenth century ====
Italy around the turn of the millennium, showing the Lombard states in the south on the eve of the arrival of the Normans

The independent state of Salerno inspired the gastalds of Capua to move towards independence, and by the end of the century they were styling themselves "princes" and as a third Lombard state. The Capuan and Beneventan states were united by Atenulf I of Capua in 900. He subsequently declared them to be in perpetual union, and they were separated only in 982, on the death of Pandulf Ironhead. With all of the Lombard south under his control, except Salerno, Atenulf felt safe to use the title Princeps Gentis Langobardorum ("prince of the Lombard people"), which Arechis II had begun using in 774. Among Atenulf's successors the principality was ruled jointly by fathers, sons, brothers, cousins, and uncles for the greater part of the century.

Meanwhile, the prince Gisulf I of Salerno began using the title Langobardorum Gentis Princeps around mid-century, but the ideal of a united Lombard principality was realised only in December 977, when Gisulf died and his domains were inherited by Pandulf Ironhead, who temporarily held almost all Italy south of Rome and brought the Lombards into an alliance with the Holy Roman Empire. His territories were divided upon his death.

The Principate of Salerno under Guaimar IV (1027-1052) controlled all southern continental Italy (includind Naples as a "vassal" duchy)

Landulf the Red of Benevento and Capua tried to conquer the principality of Salerno with the help of John III of Naples, but with the aid of Mastalus I of Amalfi, Gisulf repulsed him. The rulers of Benevento and Capua made several attempts on Byzantine Apulia at this time, but late in the century, the Byzantines, under the stiff rule of Basil II, gained ground on the Lombards.

According to the Catalogum Principum Salerni, the Prince of "langobard Salerno" Guaimar IV ruled for 34 years and 17 days. He conquered and was: Duke of Amalfi (1039–1052), Duke of Gaeta (1040–1041), and Prince of Capua (1038–1047) in Southern Italy over the period from 1027 to 1052. He was an important figure in the final phase of Byzantine authority in the Mezzogiorno and the commencement of Norman power. Guaimar's legacy includes his dominion, either by conquest or otherwise, over Salerno, Amalfi, Gaeta, Naples, Sorrento, Apulia, Calabria, and Capua at one time or another. He was the last great Lombard prince of the south, but perhaps he is best known for his character, which the Lord Norwich sums up this way: "...without once breaking a promise or betraying a trust. Up to the day he died his honour and good faith had never once been called in question.". Salerno in these decades was the main and more rich city (called "Opulenta Salernum") in southern Italy, even because of the "Schola Medica Salernitana" (the first "university" of medicine in Europe).

After the assassination of Guaimar IV the Principality of Salerno started to be dominated more and more by the Normans: in 1077 ended the history of the Langobards in Italy when this Principality was conquered by the Norman Robert Guiscard.

The principal source for the history of the Lombard principalities in this period is the Chronicon Salernitanum, composed late in the tenth century at Salerno.

==== Norman conquest, 1017–1078 ====
The diminished Beneventan principality soon lost its independence to the papacy and declined in importance until it fell in the Norman conquest of southern Italy. The Normans, first called in by the Lombards to fight the Byzantines for control of Apulia and Calabria (under the likes of Melus of Bari and Arduin, among others), had become rivals for hegemony in the south. The Salernitan principality experienced a golden age under Guaimar III and Guaimar IV, but under Gisulf II, the principality shrank to insignificance and fell in 1078 to Robert Guiscard, who had married Gisulf's sister Sichelgaita. The Capua principality was hotly contested during the reign of the hated Pandulf IV, the Wolf of the Abruzzi, and, under his son, it fell, almost without contest, to the Norman Richard Drengot (1058). The Capuans revolted against Norman rule in 1091, expelling Richard's grandson Richard II and setting up one Lando IV.

Capua was again put under Norman rule after the Siege of Capua of 1098 and the city quickly declined in importance under a series of ineffective Norman rulers. The independent status of these Lombard states is in general attested by the ability of their rulers to switch suzerains at will. Often the legal vassal of the pope or the emperor (either Byzantine or Holy Roman), they were the real power-brokers in the south until their erstwhile allies the Normans rose to preeminence.

== Genetics ==
A genetic study published in Nature Communications in September 2018 found strong genetic similarities between Lombards of Italy and earlier Lombards of Central Europe. Lombard males were primarily carriers of subclades of haplogroup R1b and I2a2a1, both of which are common among Germanic peoples. Lombard males were found to be more genetically homogeneous than Lombard females. The evidence suggested that the Lombards originated in Central/Northern Europe, and were a patriarchal people who settled Central Europe and then later Italy through a migration from the north.

A genetic study published in Science Advances in September 2018 examined the remains of a Lombard male buried at an Alemannic graveyard. He was found to be a carrier of the paternal haplogroup R1b1a2a1a1c2b2b and the maternal haplogroup H65a. The graveyard also included the remains of a Frankish and a Byzantine male, both of whom were also carriers of subclades of the paternal haplogroup R1b1a2a1a1. The Lombard, Frankish and Byzantine males were all found to be closely related, and displayed close genetic links to Northern Europe, particularly Lithuania and Iceland.

A genetic study published in the European Journal of Human Genetics in January 2019 examined the mtDNA of a large number of early-medieval Lombard remains from Central Europe and Italy. These individuals were found to be closely related and displayed strong genetic links to Central Europe. The evidence suggested that the Lombard settlement of Italy was the result of a migration from the north involving both males and females.

== Culture ==
=== Language ===
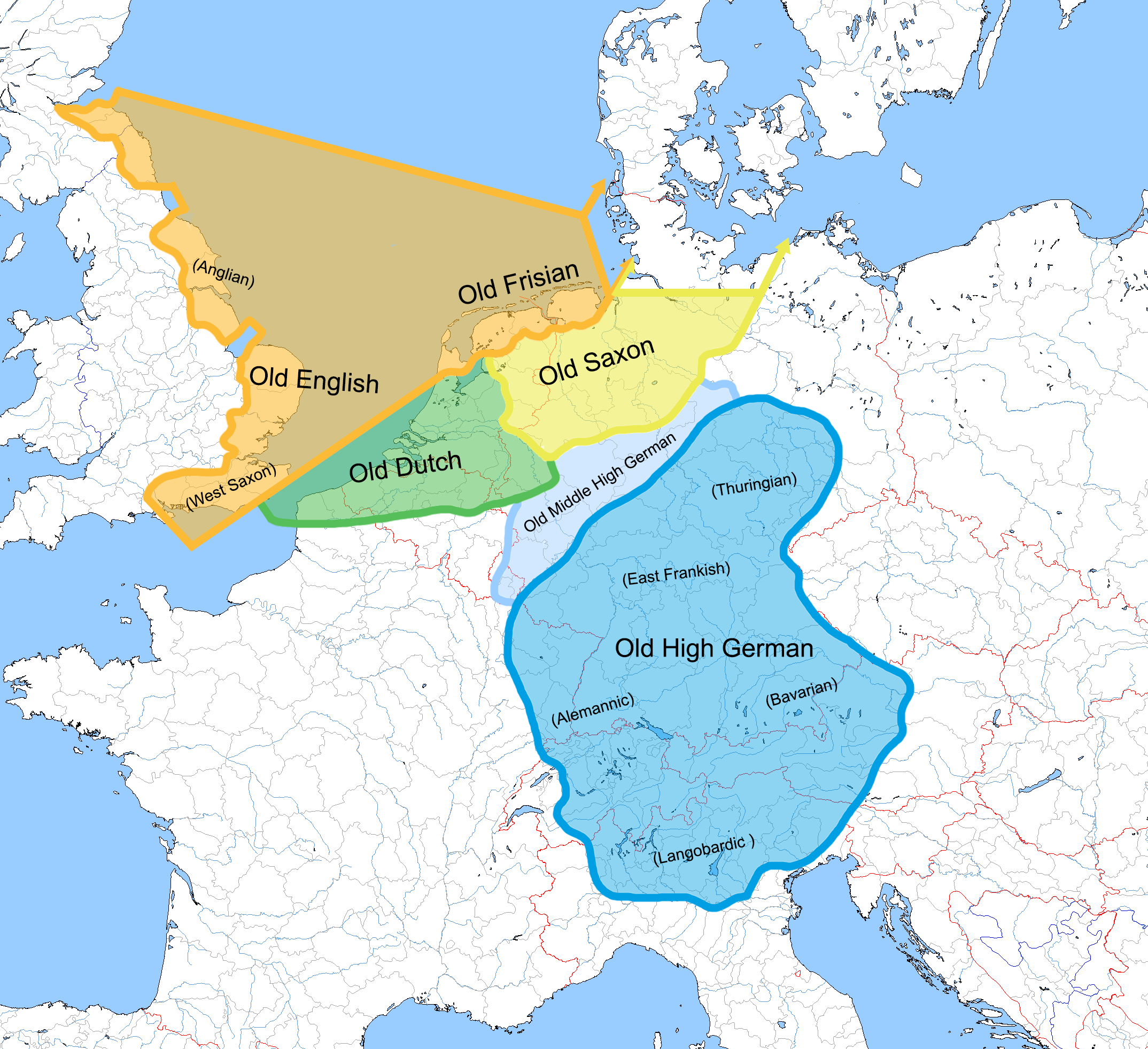
The West-Germanic languages around the sixth century CE

Unless Cimbrian and Mòcheno represent surviving dialects, the Lombardic language is extinct. It declined beginning in the seventh century, but may have been in scattered use until as late as about the year 1000. Only fragments of the language have survived, the main evidence being individual words quoted in Latin texts. In the absence of Lombardic texts, it is not possible to draw any conclusions about the language's morphology and syntax. The genetic classification of the language depends entirely on phonology. Since there is evidence that Lombardic participated in, and indeed shows some of the earliest evidence for, the High German consonant shift, it is usually classified as an Upper German dialect descended from Elbe Germanic.

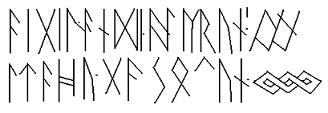
The runic inscription from the Pforzen buckle may be the earliest written example of Lombardic language

Lombardic fragments are preserved in runic inscriptions. Primary source texts include short inscriptions in the Elder Futhark, among them the "bronze capsule of Schretzheim" (c. 600) and the silver belt buckle found in Pforzen, Ostallgäu (Schwaben). A number of Latin texts include Lombardic names, and Lombardic legal texts contain terms taken from the legal vocabulary of the vernacular. In 2005, Emilia Denčeva argued that the inscription of the Pernik sword may be Lombardic.

Paul the Deacon, writing about 790 AD, mentioned that in his time the Bavarians and Saxons, and "other peoples of the same language lingua", were still singing songs about King Alboin (died 572 AD). This indicates that at least for the use of such songs, there was still a shared language connecting at least the Saxons and Bavarians, and possibly also the Langobardi.

The Italian language preserves a large number of Lombardic words, although it is not always easy to distinguish them from other Germanic borrowings such as those from Gothic or from Frankish. They often bear some resemblance to English words, as Lombardic was akin to Old Saxon. For instance, guardia from wardan (warden), guerra from werra (war), ricco from rikki (rich), and guadare from wadjan (to wade).

The Codice diplomatico longobardo, a collection of legal documents, makes reference to many terms of Germanic origin, some of them still in use in the Italian language:

marchio (mark), maniscalco (blacksmith), braida (suburban meadow), borgo (burg, village), fara (fundamental unity of Lombard social and military organisation, presently used as toponym), sala (hall, room, also used as toponym), staffa (stirrup), stalla (stable), sculdascio, faida (feud), manigoldo (scoundrel), sgherro (henchman); fanone (baleen), stamberga (hovel); anca (hip), guancia (cheek), nocca (knuckle), schiena (back); gazza (magpie), martora (marten); gualdo (wood, presently used as toponym); verbs like bussare (to knock), russare (to snore).

=== Social structure ===
==== Migration Period society ====
During their stay at the mouth of the Elbe, the Lombards came into contact with other western Germanic populations, such as the Saxons and the Frisians. From these populations, which had long been in contact with the Celts (especially the Saxons), they adopted a rigid social organisation into castes, rarely present in other Germanic peoples.

The Lombard kings can be traced back as early as c. 380 and thus to the beginning of the Great Migration. Kingship developed among the Germanic peoples when the unity of a single military command was found necessary. Schmidt believed that the Germanic tribes were divided into cantons and that the earliest government was a general assembly that selected canton chiefs and war leaders in times of conflict. All such figures were probably selected from a caste of nobility. As a result of the wars of their wanderings, royal power developed such that the king became the representative of the people, but the influence of the people on the government did not fully disappear. Paul the Deacon gives an account of the Lombard tribal structure during the migration:

... in order that they might increase the number of their warriors, [the Lombards] confer liberty upon many whom they deliver from the yoke of bondage, and that the freedom of these may be regarded as established, they confirm it in their accustomed way by an arrow, uttering certain words of their country in confirmation of the fact.

Complete emancipation appears to have been granted only among the Franks and the Lombards.

==== Society of the Catholic kingdom ====
Lombard society was divided into classes comparable to those found in the other Germanic successor states of Rome, Frankish Gaul and Spain under the Visigoths. There was a noble class, a class of free persons beneath them, a class of unfree non-slaves (serfs), and finally slaves. The aristocracy itself was poorer, more urbanised, and less landed than elsewhere. Aside from the richest and most powerful of the dukes and the king himself, Lombard noblemen tended to live in cities (unlike their Frankish counterparts) and hold little more than twice as much in land as the merchant class (a far cry from provincial Frankish aristocrats who held vast swathes of land, hundreds of times larger than those beneath his status). The aristocracy by the eighth century was highly dependent on the king for means of income related especially to judicial duties: many Lombard nobles are referred to in contemporary documents as iudices (judges) even when their offices had important military and legislative functions as well.

The freemen of the Lombard kingdom were far more numerous than in Frankish lands, especially in the eighth century, when they are almost invisible in surviving documentary evidence. Smallholders, owner-cultivators, and rentiers are the most numerous types of person in surviving diplomata for the Lombard kingdom. They may have owned more than half of the land in Lombard Italy. The freemen were exercitales and viri devoti, that is, soldiers and "devoted men" (a military term like "retainers"); they formed the levy of the Lombard army, and they were sometimes, if infrequently, called to serve, though this seems not to have been their preference. The small landed class, however, lacked the political influence necessary with the king (and the dukes) to control the politics and legislation of the kingdom. The aristocracy was more thoroughly powerful politically if not economically in Italy than in contemporary Gaul and Spain.

Lombard warrior, bronze statue, eighth century, Pavia Civic Museums

The urbanisation of Lombard Italy was characterised by the città ad isole (or "city as islands"). It appears from archaeology that the great cities of Lombard Italy (Pavia, Lucca, Siena, Arezzo, Milan) were themselves formed of small urban cores within the old Roman city walls. The cities of the Roman Empire had been partially destroyed in the series of wars of the fifth and sixth centuries. Many sectors were left in ruins and ancient monuments became fields of grass used as pastures for animals, thus the Roman Forum became the Campo Vaccino, the field of cows. The portions of the cities that remained intact were small, modest, contained a cathedral or major church (often sumptuously decorated), and a few public buildings and townhouses of the aristocracy. Few buildings of importance were stone, most were wood. In the end, the inhabited parts of the cities were separated from one another by stretches of pasture even within the city walls.

==== Lombard states ====
- Lombard state on the Carpathians (sixth century)
- Lombard state in Pannonia (sixth century)
- Kingdom of Italy and List of kings of the Lombards
- Principality of Benevento and List of dukes and princes of Benevento
- Principality of Salerno and List of princes of Salerno
- Principality of Capua and List of princes of Capua

=== Religious history ===
The legend from Origo may hint that initially, before the passage from Scandinavia to the southern coast of the Baltic Sea, the Lombards worshiped the Vanir. Later, in contact with other Germanic populations, they adopted the worship of the Æsir: an evolution that marked the passage from the adoration of deities related to fertility and the earth to the cult of warlike gods.

In chapter 40 of his Germania, Roman historian Tacitus, discussing the Suebian tribes of Germania, writes that the Lombards were one of the Suebian tribes united in worship of the deity Nerthus, who is often identified with the Norse goddess Freyja. The other tribes were the Reudigni, Aviones, Anglii, Varini, Eudoses, Suarines and Nuitones.

St. Barbatus of Benevento observed many pagan rituals and traditions among the Lombards authorised by the Duke Romuald, son of King Grimoald:

They expressed a religious veneration to a golden viper, and prostrated themselves before it: they paid also a superstitious honour to a tree, on which they hung the skin of a wild beast, and these ceremonies were closed by public games, in which the skin served for a mark at which bowmen shot arrows over their shoulder.

==== Christianisation ====
The Lombards first adopted Christianity while still in Pannonia, but their conversion and Christianisation was largely nominal and far from complete. During the reign of Wacho, they were Orthodox Catholics allied with the Byzantine Empire, but Alboin converted to Arianism as an ally of the Ostrogoths and invaded Italy. All these Christian conversions primarily affected the aristocracy, while the common people remained pagan.

In Italy, the Lombards were intensively Christianised, and the pressure to convert to Orthodox Catholicism was great. With the Bavarian queen Theodelinda, an Orthodox Catholic, the monarchy was brought under heavy Catholic influence. After initial support for the anti-Rome party in the Schism of the Three Chapters, Theodelinda remained a close contact and supporter of Pope Gregory I. In 603, Adaloald, the heir to the throne, received Orthodox Catholic baptism. However, the lack of spiritual involvement of most of the Lombards in religious disputes remained constant, so much so that the opposition between Orthodox Catholics, on the one hand, and pagans, Arians and schismatics, on the other, soon took on political significance. The supporters of Roman orthodoxy, led by the Bavarian dynasty, were politically the proponents of greater integration with the Romans, accompanied by a strategy of preserving the status quo with the Byzantines. Arians, pagans and schismatics, rooted above all in the northeastern regions of the kingdom (Austria), were instead interpreters of the preservation of the warlike and aggressive spirit of the people. Thus, to the "pro-Catholic" phase of Agilulf, Theodolinda and Adaloald followed, from 626 (Arioald's accession to the throne) to 690 (definitive defeat of the rebel Alahis), a long phase of the revival of Arianism, embodied by militarily aggressive kings like Rothari and Grimoald. However, tolerance towards Orthodox Catholics was never questioned by the various kings, also safeguarded by the influential contribution of the respective queens (largely chosen, for reasons of dynastic legitimacy, among the Orthodox Catholic princesses of the Bavarian dynasty).

In the seventh century, the nominally Christian aristocracy of Benevento was still practising pagan rituals such as sacrifices in "sacred" woods. By the end of the reign of Cunincpert, however, the Lombards were more or less completely Catholicised. Under Liutprand Orthodox Catholicism became tangible as the king sought to justify his title rex totius Italiae by uniting the south of the peninsula with the north, thereby bringing together his Italo-Roman and Germanic subjects into one Catholic State.

==== Beneventan Christianity ====
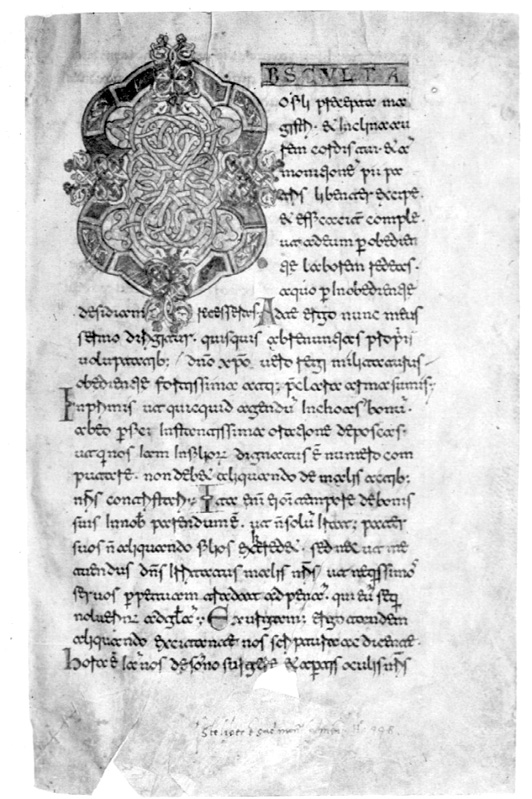
The Rule of Saint Benedict in Beneventan (i.e. Lombard) script

The Duchy and eventually Principality of Benevento in southern Italy developed a unique Christian rite in the seventh and eighth centuries. The Beneventan rite is more closely related to the liturgy of the Ambrosian rite than to the Roman rite. The Beneventan rite has not survived in its complete form, although most of the principal feasts and several feasts of local significance are extant. The Beneventan rite appears to have been less complete, less systematic, and more liturgically flexible than the Roman rite.

Characteristic of this rite was the Beneventan chant, a Lombard-influenced chant that bore similarities to the Ambrosian chant of Milan. The Beneventan chant is largely defined by its role in the liturgy of the Beneventan rite; many Beneventan chants were assigned multiple roles when inserted into Gregorian chantbooks, appearing variously as antiphons, offertories, and communions, for example. It was eventually supplanted by the Gregorian chant in the eleventh century.

The chief centre of the Beneventan chant was Montecassino, one of the first and greatest abbeys of Western monasticism. Gisulf II of Benevento had donated a large swathe of land to Montecassino in 744, and that became the basis for an important state, the Terra Sancti Benedicti, which was a subject only to Rome. The Cassinese influence on Christianity in southern Italy was immense. Montecassino was also the starting point for another characteristic of Beneventan monasticism, the use of the distinct Beneventan script, a clear, angular script derived from the Roman cursive as used by the Lombards.

=== Art ===
During their nomadic phase, the Lombards primarily created art that was easily carried with them, like arms and jewellery. Though relatively little of this has survived, it bears resemblance to the similar endeavours of other Germanic tribes of central Europe from the same era.

The first major modifications to the Germanic style of the Lombards came in Pannonia and especially in Italy, under the influence of local, Byzantine, and Christian styles. The conversions from nomadism and paganism to settlement and Christianity also opened up new arenas of artistic expressions, such as architecture (especially churches) and its accompanying decorative arts (such as frescoes).

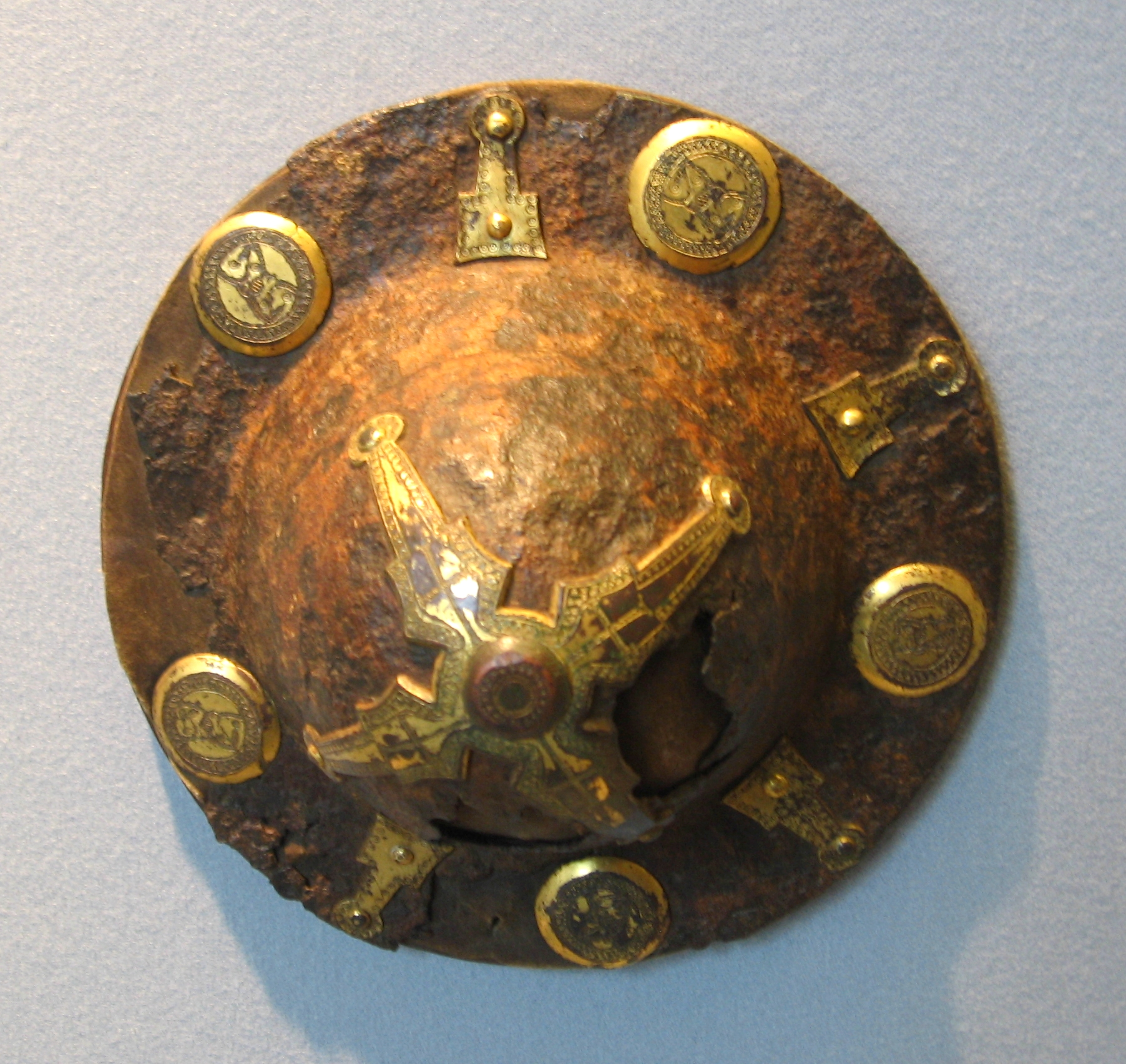
Lombard shield boss
northern Italy, seventh century, Metropolitan Museum of Art

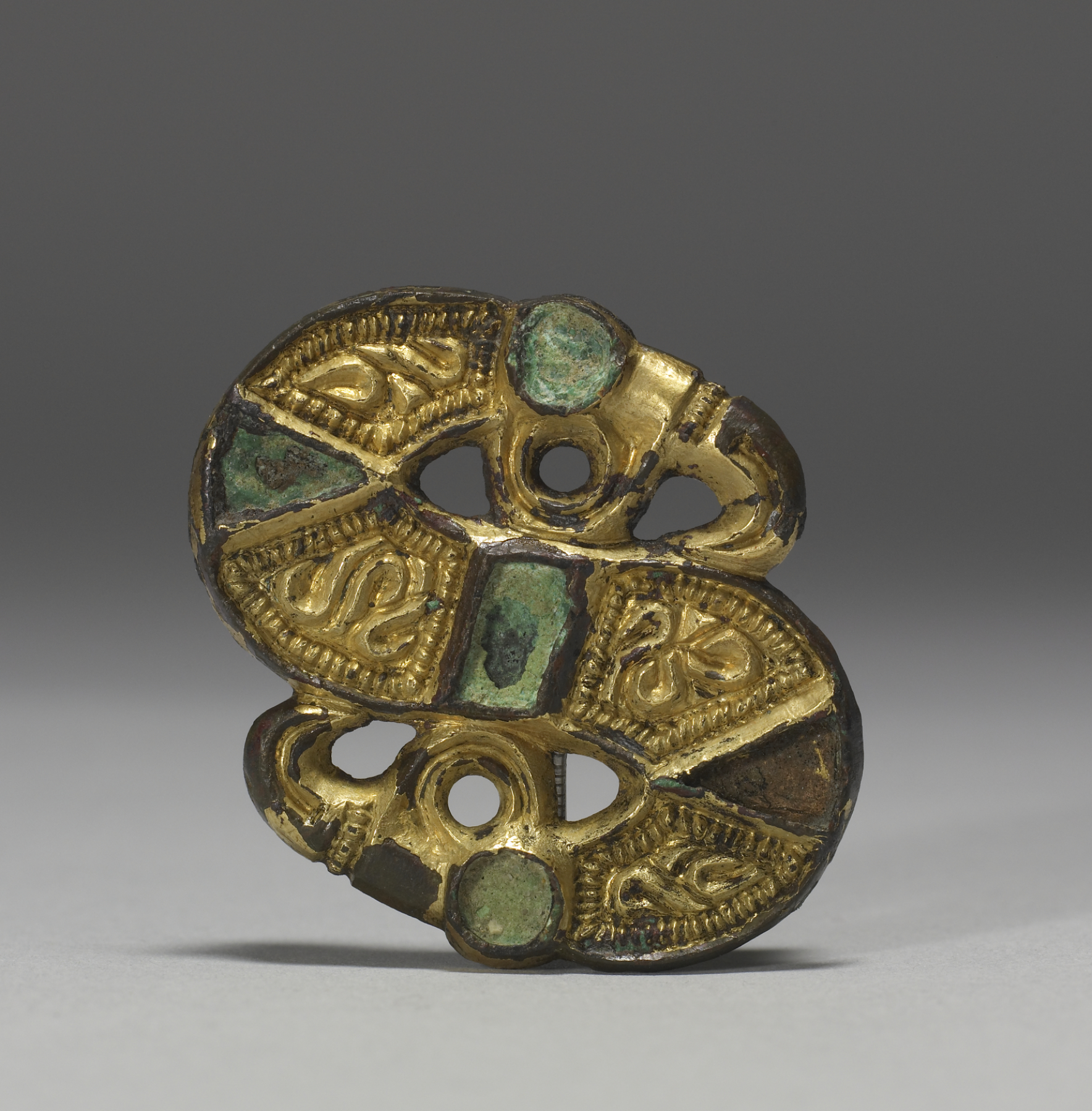
Lombard S-shaped fibula

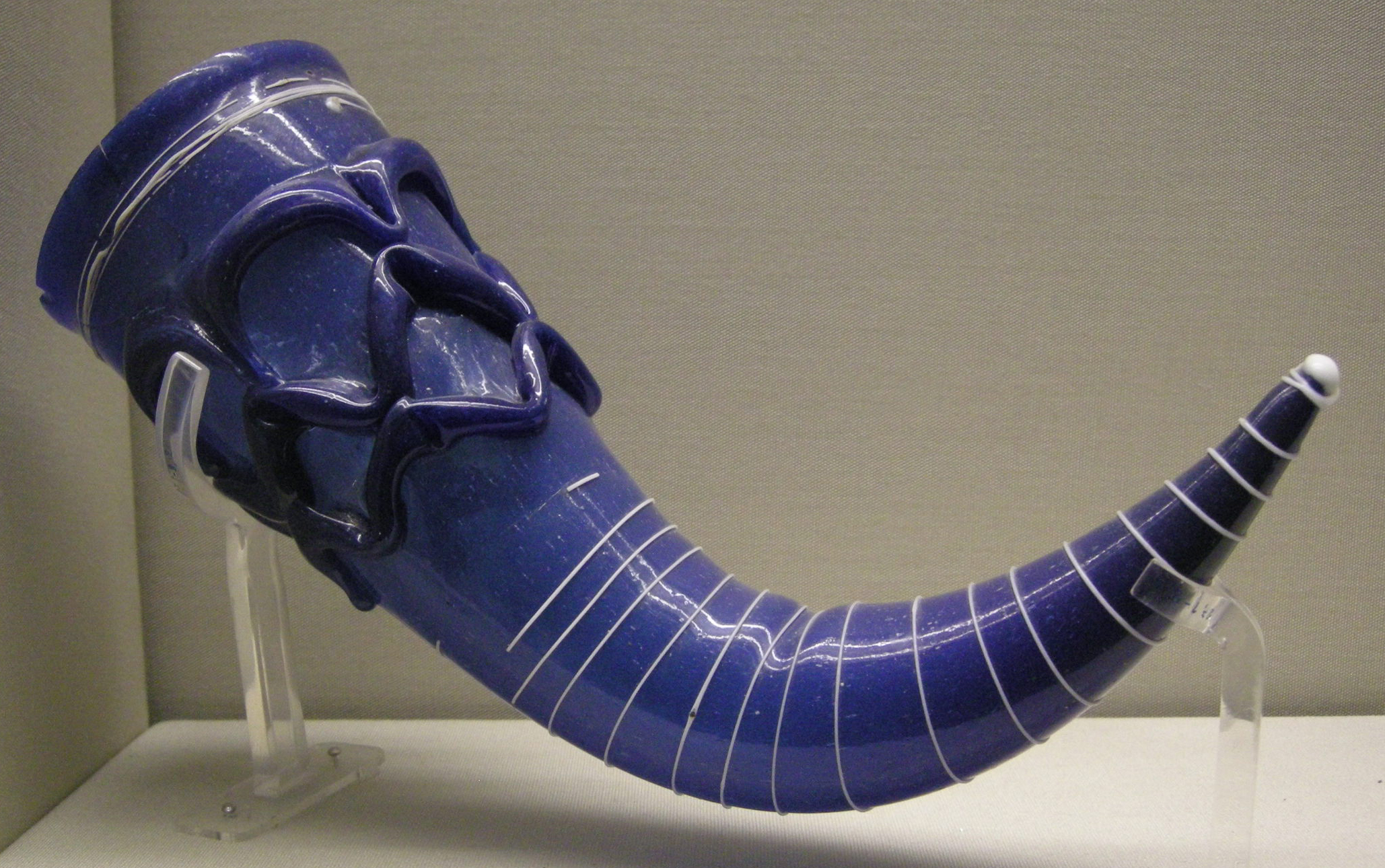
A glass drinking horn from Castel Trosino

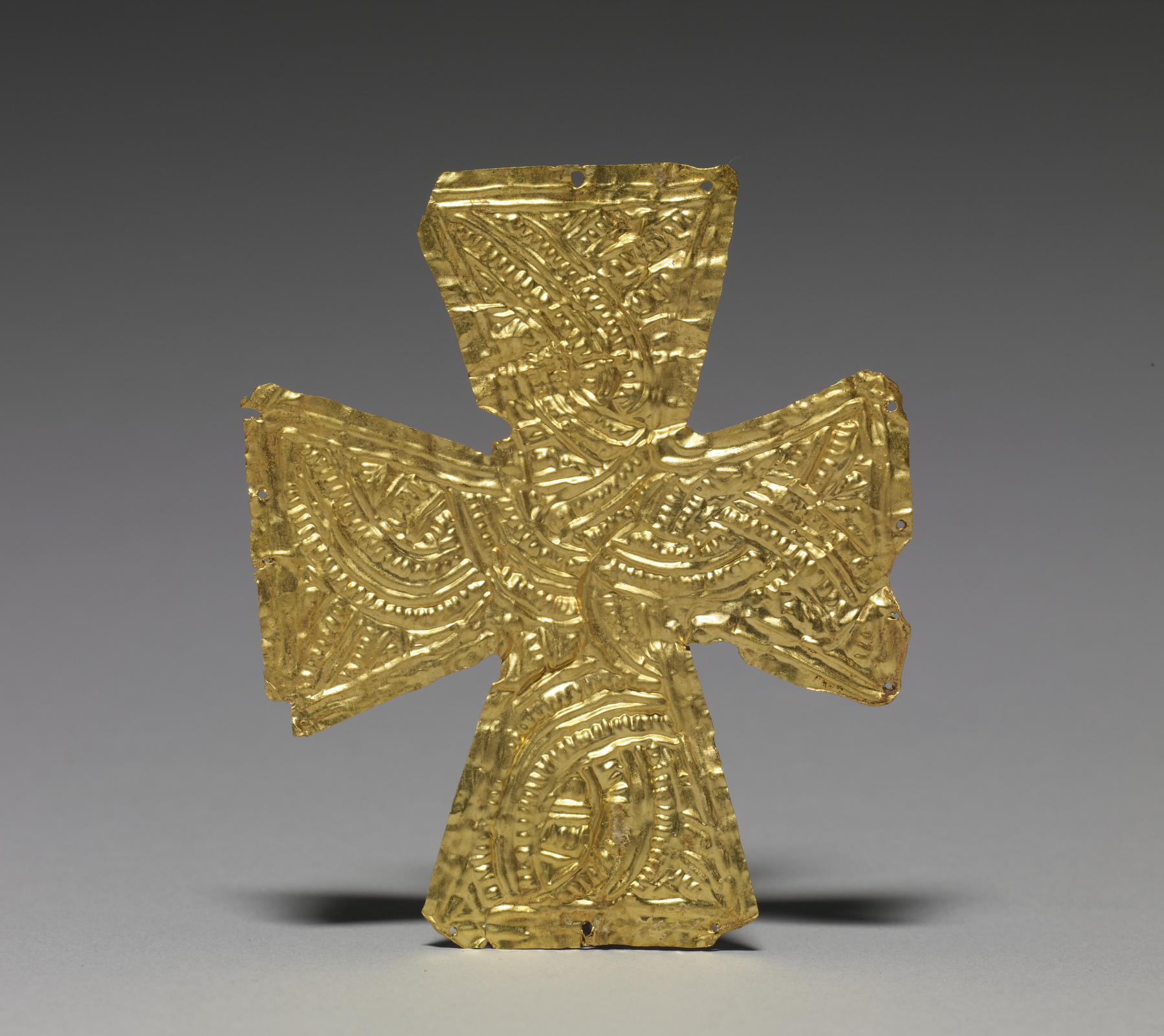
Lombard Goldblattkreuz

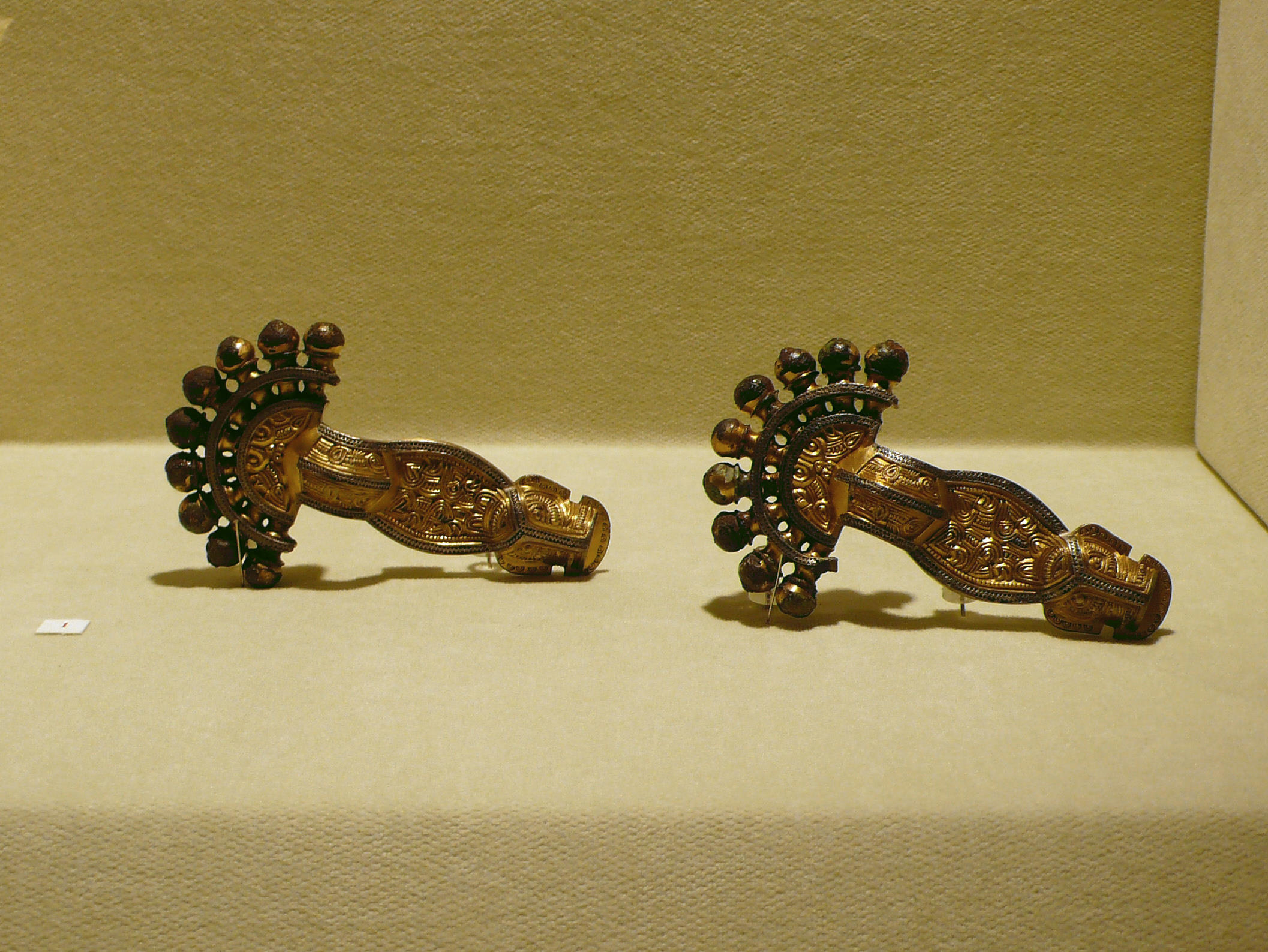
Lombard fibulae

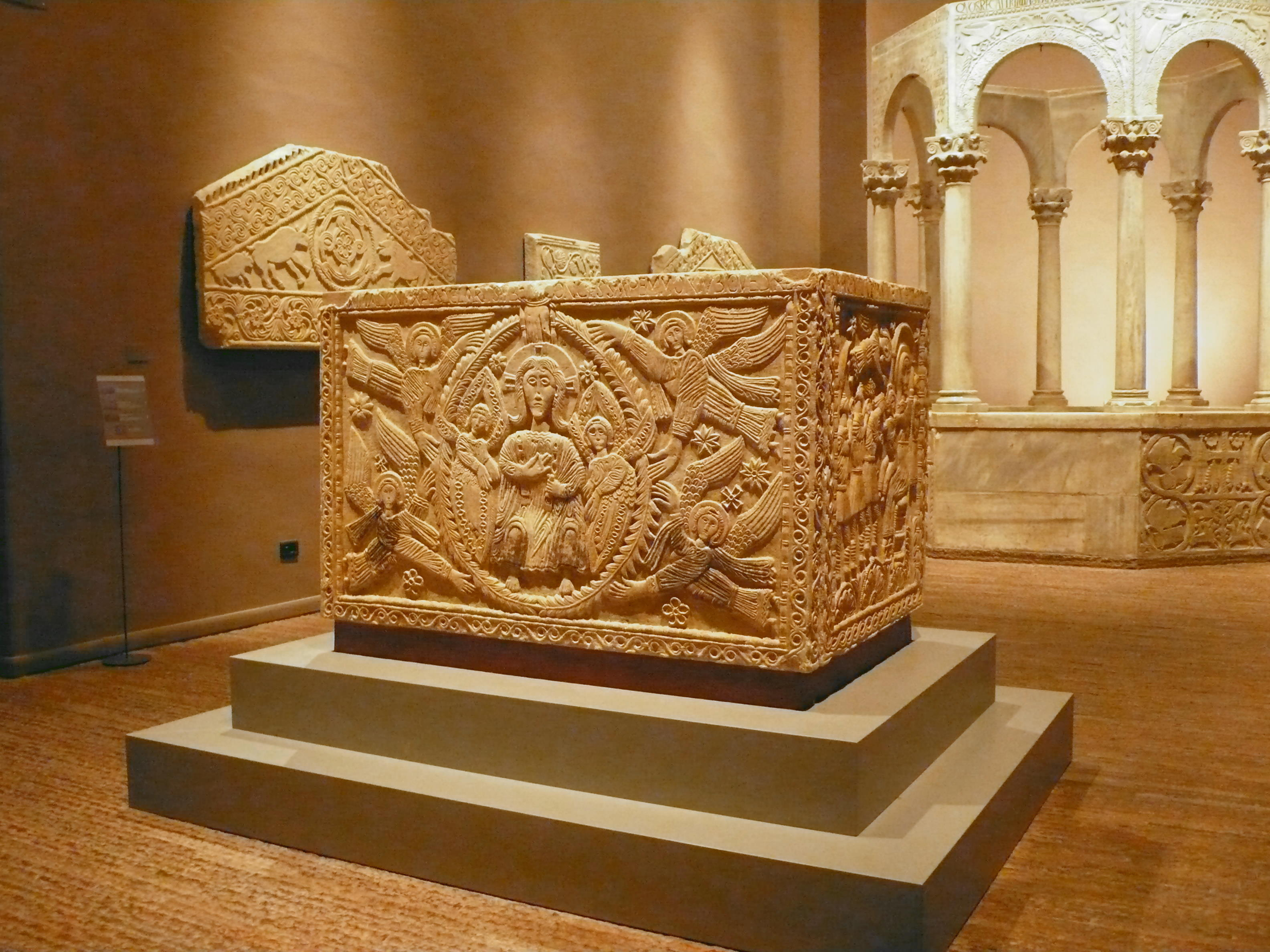
Altar of Ratchis

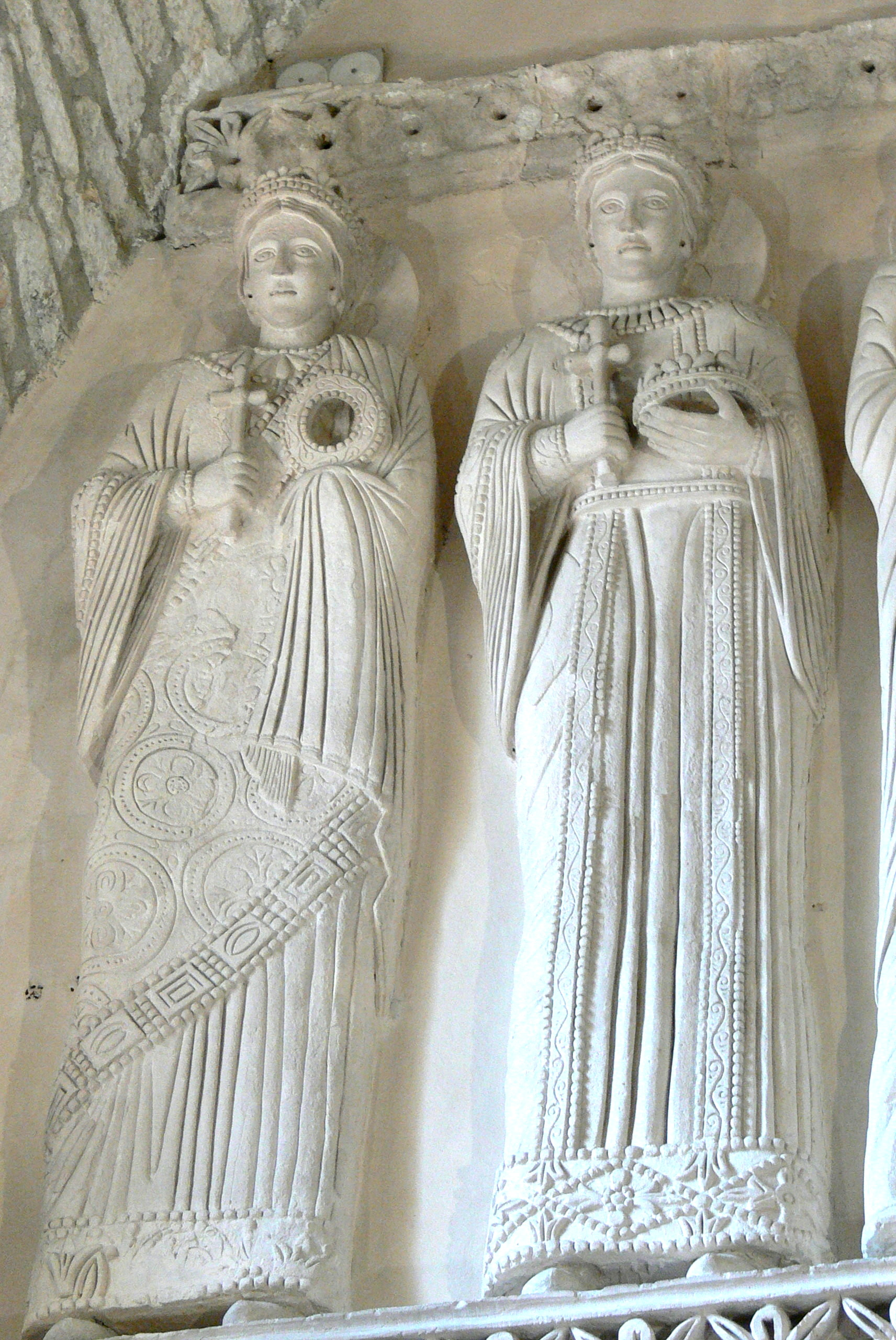
Eighth-century Lombard sculpture depicting female martyrs, based on a Byzantine model. Tempietto Longobardo, Cividale del Friuli

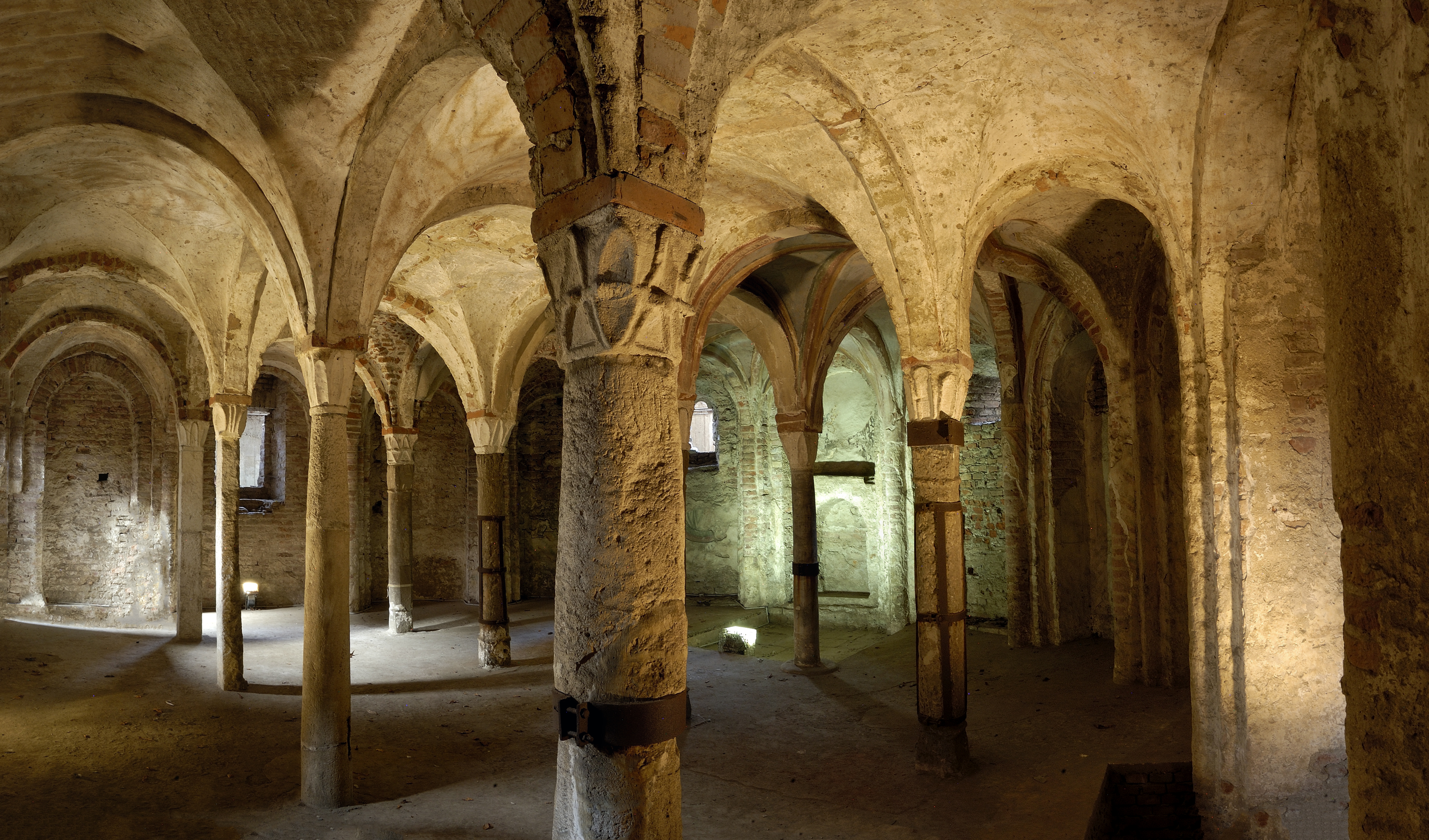
Crypt of Sant'Eusebio, Pavia.

==== Architecture ====
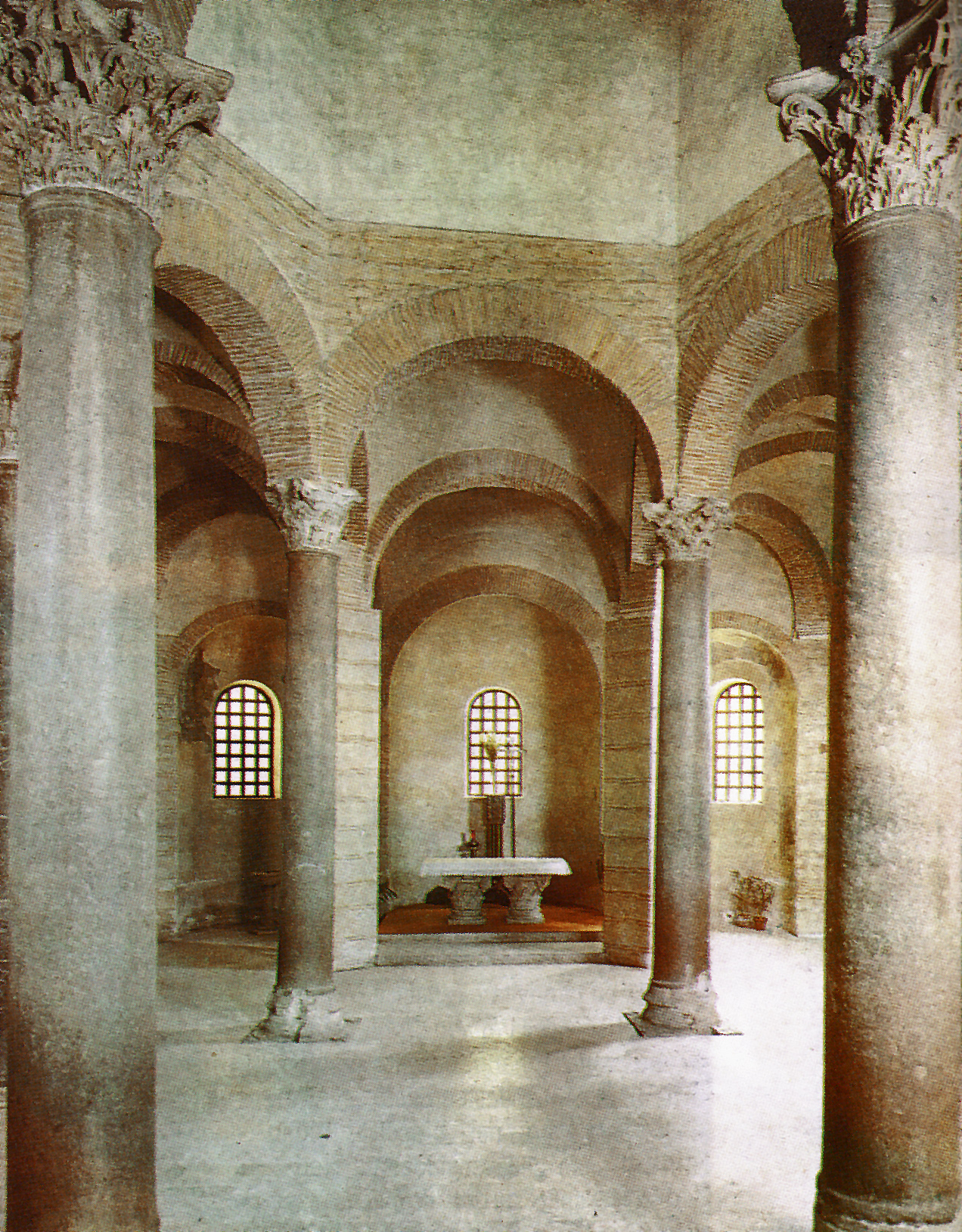
Church of Santa Sofia, Benevento

Few Lombard buildings have survived. Most have been lost, rebuilt, or renovated at some point, so they preserve little of their original Lombard structure. Lombard architecture was well-studied in the twentieth century, and the four-volume Lombard Architecture (1919) by Arthur Kingsley Porter is a "monument of illustrated history".

The small Oratorio di Santa Maria in Valle in Cividale del Friuli is probably one of the oldest preserved examples of Lombard architecture, as Cividale was the first Lombard city in Italy. Parts of Lombard constructions have been preserved in Pavia (San Pietro in Ciel d'Oro, crypts of Sant'Eusebio and San Giovanni Domnarum) and Monza (cathedral). The Basilic autariana in Fara Gera d'Adda near Bergamo and the church of San Salvatore in Brescia also have Lombard elements. All these buildings are in northern Italy (Langobardia major), but by far the best-preserved Lombard structure is in southern Italy (Langobardia minor). The Church of Santa Sofia in Benevento was erected in 760 by Duke Arechis II, and it preserves Lombard frescoes on the walls and even Lombard capitals on the columns.

Lombard architecture flourished under the impulse provided by the Catholic monarchs like Theodelinda, Liutprand, and Desiderius to the foundation of monasteries to further their political control. Bobbio Abbey was founded during this time.

Some of the late Lombard structures of the ninth and tenth centuries have been found to contain elements of style associated with Romanesque architecture and so have been dubbed "first Romanesque". These edifices are considered, along with some similar buildings in southern France and Catalonia, to mark a transitory phase between the Pre-Romanesque and full-fledged Romanesque.

== Notes and sources ==
=== Sources ===
- Cardini, Franco (2019). Storia medievale (in Italian). Florence: Le Monnier Università. ISBN 978-88-00-74815-5.
- Amorim, Carlos Eduardo G. (11 September 2018). "Understanding 6th-century barbarian social organization and migration through paleogenomics". Nature Communications. 9 (3547) 3547. Nature Research. Bibcode:2018NatCo...9.3547A. bioRxiv 10.1101/268250. doi:10.1038/s41467-018-06024-4. PMC 6134036. PMID 30206220.
- Bluhme, Friedrich (1868). Die Gens Langobardorum und ihre Herkunft, ...und ihre Sprache [The Gens Langobardorum and their origin, ...and their language] (in German). Bonn: A.Marcus.
- Brown, Thomas S. (2005). "Lombards". In Kazhdan, Alexander P. (ed.). The Oxford Dictionary of Byzantium. Oxford University Press. ISBN 978-0-19-518792-2.
- Bruckner, Wilhelm (1895). "Die Sprache der Langobarden" [The language of the Lombards]. Quellen und Forschungen zur Sprach- und Culturgeschichte der germanischen Völker (in German). 75. Strassburg: Karl J. Trübner.
- Chadwick Oman, Charles William (2016). The Dark Ages 476–918. Palala Press. ISBN 978-1-358-37856-0.
- Christie, Neil (2018a). "Lombards". In Nicholson, Oliver (ed.). The Oxford Dictionary of Late Antiquity. Oxford University Press. pp. 920–922. doi:10.1093/acref/9780198662778.001.0001. ISBN 978-0-19-174445-7.
- Christie, Neil (2018b). "Lombard Invasion Of Italy". In Nicholson, Oliver (ed.). The Oxford Dictionary of Late Antiquity. Oxford University Press. pp. 919–920. doi:10.1093/acref/9780198662778.001.0001. ISBN 978-0-19-174445-7.
- Christie, Neil (1995). The Lombards. Wiley. ISBN 0-631-18238-1.
- Christensen, Arne Søby (2002). Cassiodorus, Jordanes and the History of the Goths. Museum Tusculanum Press. ISBN 978-87-7289-710-3.
- Daim, Falko (2019). "The Longobards in Pannonia". Prima e dopo Alboino: sulle tracce dei Longobardi [Before and after Alboino: on the trail of the Lombards] (in Italian). Napoli: Guida. pp. 221–241.
- Darvill, Timothy (2009). "Lombards". The Concise Oxford Dictionary of Archaeology (3 ed.). Oxford University Press. doi:10.1093/acref/9780199534043.001.0001. ISBN 978-0-19-172713-9.
- Eger, Christoph (2001). "III. Archäologisches §10-§11". In Beck, Heinrich; Geuenich, Dieter; Steuer, Heiko (eds.). Reallexikon der Germanischen Altertumskunde. Vol. 18 (2 ed.). De Gruyter. pp. 69–77. ISBN 978-3-11-016950-8.
- Everett, Nicholas (2003). Literacy in Lombard Italy, c. 568–774. Cambridge: Cambridge University Press. ISBN 978-0-521-81905-3.
- The Lombard Laws. Translated by Fischer Drew, Katherine. Philadelphia: University of Pennsylvania Press. 1973. ISBN 0-8122-1055-7.
- Fock, Gustav (1884). Älteste Geschichte der Langobarden. Ein Beitrag zur Geschichte der Völkerwanderung (in German). Leipzig: Universität.
- Fröhlich, Hermann (1980). Studien zur langobardischen Thronfolge [Studies on the Longobard succession] (in German). In two volumes. Diss. Eberhard-Karls-Universität zu Tübingen.
- Fröhlich, Hermann (1976). "Zur Herkunft der Langobarden" [On the origin of the Lombards]. Quellen und Forschungen aus italienischen Archiven und Bibliotheken (QFIAB) 55/56 [Sources and Research from Italian Archives and Libraries (QFIAB) 55/56] (in German). Tübingen: Max Niemeyer. pp. 1–21.
- Giess, Hildegard (September 1959). "The Sculpture of the Cloister of Santa Sofia in Benevento". The Art Bulletin. 41 (3): 249–256. doi:10.1080/00043079.1959.11407988. JSTOR 3047841.
- Grimm, Jacob (2003). Deutsche Mythologie (in German). Marix. ISBN 3-932412-24-9.
- Hallenbeck, Jan T. (1982). "Pavia and Rome: The Lombard Monarchy and the Papacy in the Eighth Century". Transactions of the American Philosophical Society. New Series. 74 (4). Philadelphia: American Philosophical Society.
- Hartmann, Ludwig Moritz (2011). Geschichte Italiens Im Mittelalter (in German). Nabu Press. ISBN 978-1-247-55184-5.
- Hutterer, Claus Jürgen (1999). "Langobardisch" [Lombardish]. Die Germanischen Sprachen [The Germanic Languages] (in German). Wiesbaden: Albus. pp. 336–341. ISBN 3-928127-57-8.
- Heath, Christopher (2025). The Lombards in Italy. York: Arc Humanities Press. ISBN 9781802702699.
- Hodgkin, Thomas (2012). Italy and her invaders. Ulan Press.
- Jarnut, Jörg (2002). Storia dei Longobardi. Turin: Einaudi. ISBN 88-06-16182-2.
- Kazanski, Michel (2020). "Archaeology of the Slavic Migrations" (PDF). Encyclopedia of Slavic Languages and Linguistics Online. BRILL.
- Kazanski, Michel (2023). "Первые контакты дунайских славян и авар: свидетельства византийских авторов и археологии" [First contacts of the Danubian Slavs and Avars: the evidences from the Byzantine writers and archaeology]. Antichnaya Drevnost's I Srednie Veka. 23. Ural University Press. doi:10.15826/adsv.2023.51.004.
- Leonardi, Michela (6 September 2018). "Storia dei Longobardi". American Journal of Physical Anthropology. 167 (3). Wiley: 497–506. bioRxiv 10.1101/268250. doi:10.1002/ajpa.23679. PMID 30187463. S2CID 52161000.
- Liccardo, Salvatore (2024). Old names, new peoples: listing ethnonyms in late antiquity. Leiden Boston: Brill. ISBN 9789004685895.
- Menghin, Wilifred (1985). Die Langobarden / Geschichte und Archäologie (in German). Stuttgart: Theiss. ISBN 3-926642-23-8.
- Nedoma, Robert (2001). "Langobarden I. Philologisches § 1. Ethnonym". In Beck, Heinrich; Geuenich, Dieter; Steuer, Heiko (eds.). Reallexikon der Germanischen Altertumskunde. Vol. 18 (2 ed.). De Gruyter. pp. 50–52. ISBN 978-3-11-016950-8.
- O'Sullivan, Niall (9 September 2018). "Ancient genome-wide analyses infer kinship structure in an Early Medieval Alemannic graveyard". Science Advances. 4 (9) eaao1262. American Association for the Advancement of Science. Bibcode:2018SciA....4.1262O. doi:10.1126/sciadv.aao1262. PMC 6124919. PMID 30191172.
- Paul the Deacon (1907). History of the Langobards. Translated by Foulke, William Dudley. Philadelphia: University of Pennsylvania.
- Pavlovič, Daša (2015). "The beginning of Slavic settlement in north-eastern Slovenia and the relation between "Slavic" and "Lombard" settlement based on new interpretations of the archaeological material and radiocarbon dating". Fundberichte aus Österreich. Tagungsbände. 1.
- Peters, Edward (2003). History of the Lombards: Translated by William Dudley Foulke. University of Pennsylvania Press.
- Pleterski, Andrej (2015). "Ранние славяне в Восточных Альпах и на соседних землях" [The Early Slavs in the Eastern Alps and Their Periphery]. Stratum Plus (in Russian) (5).
- Pohl, Walter (2024). Die Langobarden Herrschaft und Identität (in German). Wien: Verlag der Österreichischen Akademie der Wissenschaften. ISBN 978-3-7001-3400-8.
- Priester, Karin (2004). Die Geschichte der Langobarden: Gesellschaft – Kultur – Alltagsleben. Stuttgart: Theiss. ISBN 3-8062-1848-X.
- Reichert, Hermann (2004). "Scoringa". In Beck, Heinrich; Geuenich, Dieter; Steuer, Heiko (eds.). Reallexikon der Germanischen Altertumskunde. Vol. 27 (2 ed.). De Gruyter. ISBN 978-3-11-018116-6.
- Rovagnati, Sergio (2003). I Longobardi. Milan: Xenia. ISBN 88-7273-484-3.
- Santosuosso, Antonio (2004). Barbarians, Marauders, and Infidels: The Ways of Medieval Warfare. Basic Books. ISBN 0-8133-9153-9.
- Scardigli, Piergiuseppe (2001), "Langobarden I. Philologisches § 2-", in Beck, Heinrich; Geuenich, Dieter; Steuer, Heiko (eds.), Reallexikon der Germanischen Altertumskunde, vol. 18 (2 ed.), De Gruyter, pp. 50–57, ISBN 978-3-11-016950-8
- Schmidt, Ludwig (2018). Zur Geschichte der Langobarden (in German). Leipzig: Forgotten Books. ISBN 978-0-267-05957-7.
- Taviani-Carozzi, Huguette (2005). "Lombards". In Vauchez, André (ed.). Encyclopedia of the Middle Ages. James Clarke & Co. doi:10.1093/acref/9780227679319.001.0001. ISBN 978-0-19-518817-2.
- Todd, Malcolm (2004). The Early Germans. Wiley. ISBN 978-1-4051-1714-2.
- Troya, Carlo (2010). Codice Diplomatico Longobardo Dal DLXVIII Al DCCLXXIV: Con Note Storiche, Volume 1. Nabu Press. ISBN 978-1-144-25627-0.
- Udolph, Jürgen (2001). "Langobarden I. Philologisches § 5. Bardowick". In Beck, Heinrich; Geuenich, Dieter; Steuer, Heiko (eds.). Reallexikon der Germanischen Altertumskunde. Vol. 18 (2 ed.). De Gruyter. pp. 629–632. ISBN 978-3-11-016950-8.
- Vai, Stefania (19 January 2019). "A genetic perspective on Longobard-Era migrations". European Journal of Human Genetics. 27 (4). Nature Research: 647–656. doi:10.1038/s41431-018-0319-8. PMC 6460631. PMID 30651584.
- Von Hammerstein-Loxten, Wilhelm C (1869). Der Bardengau: e. histor. Unters. über dessen Verhältnisse u. über d. Güterbesitz d. Billunger (in German). Hannover: Hahn.
- Wegwitz, Willie (1972). Das langobardische Brandgräberfeld von Putensen (in German). Harburg: Hildesheim.
- Whitby, L. Michael (2012). "Lombards". In Hornblower, Simon; Spawforth, Antony; Eidinow, Esther (eds.). The Oxford Classical Dictionary (4th ed.). Oxford University Press. p. 857. doi:10.1093/acref/9780199545568.001.0001. ISBN 978-0-19-173525-7.
- Whitney, J.P. (1913). The Cambridge Medieval History: Volume II – The Rise of the Saracens and the Foundations of the Western Empire. Cambridge University Press.
- Wickham, Christopher (1998). "Aristocratic Power in Eighth-Century Lombard Italy". In Goffart, Walter A.; Murray, Alexander C. (eds.). After Rome's Fall: Narrators and Sources of Early Medieval History, Essays presented to Walter Goffart. Toronto: University of Toronto Press. pp. 153–170. ISBN 0-8020-0779-1..
- Wiese, Robert (1877). Die älteste Geschichte der Langobarden bis zum Untergange des Reiches der Heruler (in German). Ratz, Jena.
- Zeuss, Johann Kaspar (2012). Deutschen und die Nachbarstämme (in German). Nabu Press. ISBN 978-1-278-74705-7.

== Primary sources ==
- Cosmographer of Ravenna
- Historia Langobardorum codicis Gothani
- Historia Langobardorum
- Origo Gentis Langobardorum
- Tacitus. Annals
- Tacitus. Germania
