= Crypt of Sant'Eusebio =

Church crypt in Pavia, Italy

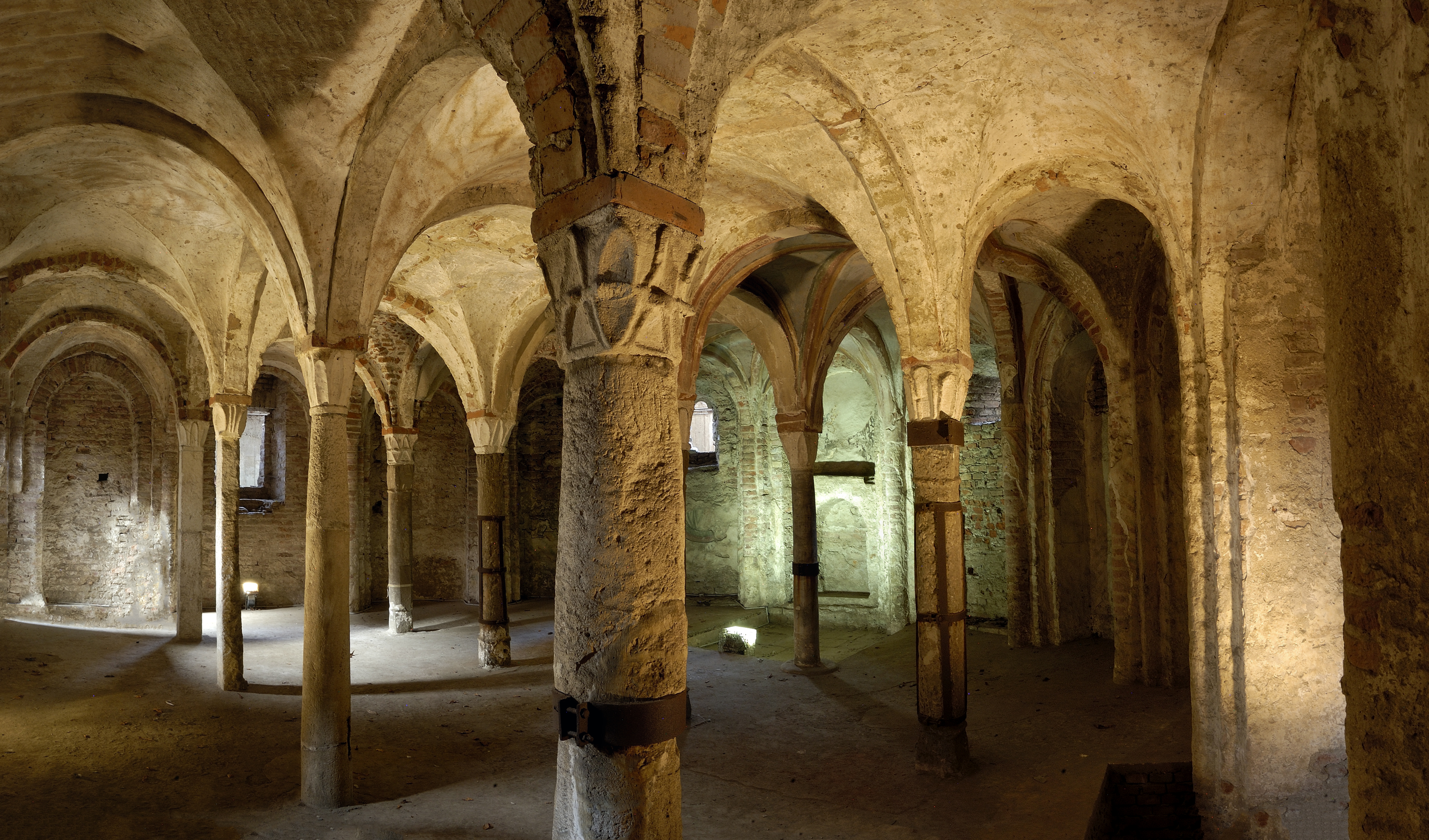
- Interior

Religion
- Affiliation: Catholic
- Province: Pavia
- Year consecrated: 7th century
- Status: Active

Location
- Location: Pavia, Italy
- Interactive map of Crypt of Sant'Eusebio
- Coordinates: 45°11′10.57″N 9°9′27.27″E

Architecture
- Type: Church
- Completed: 11th century

Sant'Eusebio was a church of Pavia, of which today only the crypt remains. The church was probably built by the Lombard king Rothari (636–652) as the city's Arian cathedral. It later became the fulcrum of the conversion to Catholicism of the Lombards initiated by Theodolinda and the monks of San Colombano and which later received, precisely in Pavia, a great impulse from King Aripert I (653–661) and from Bishop Anastasius.

== History and architecture ==
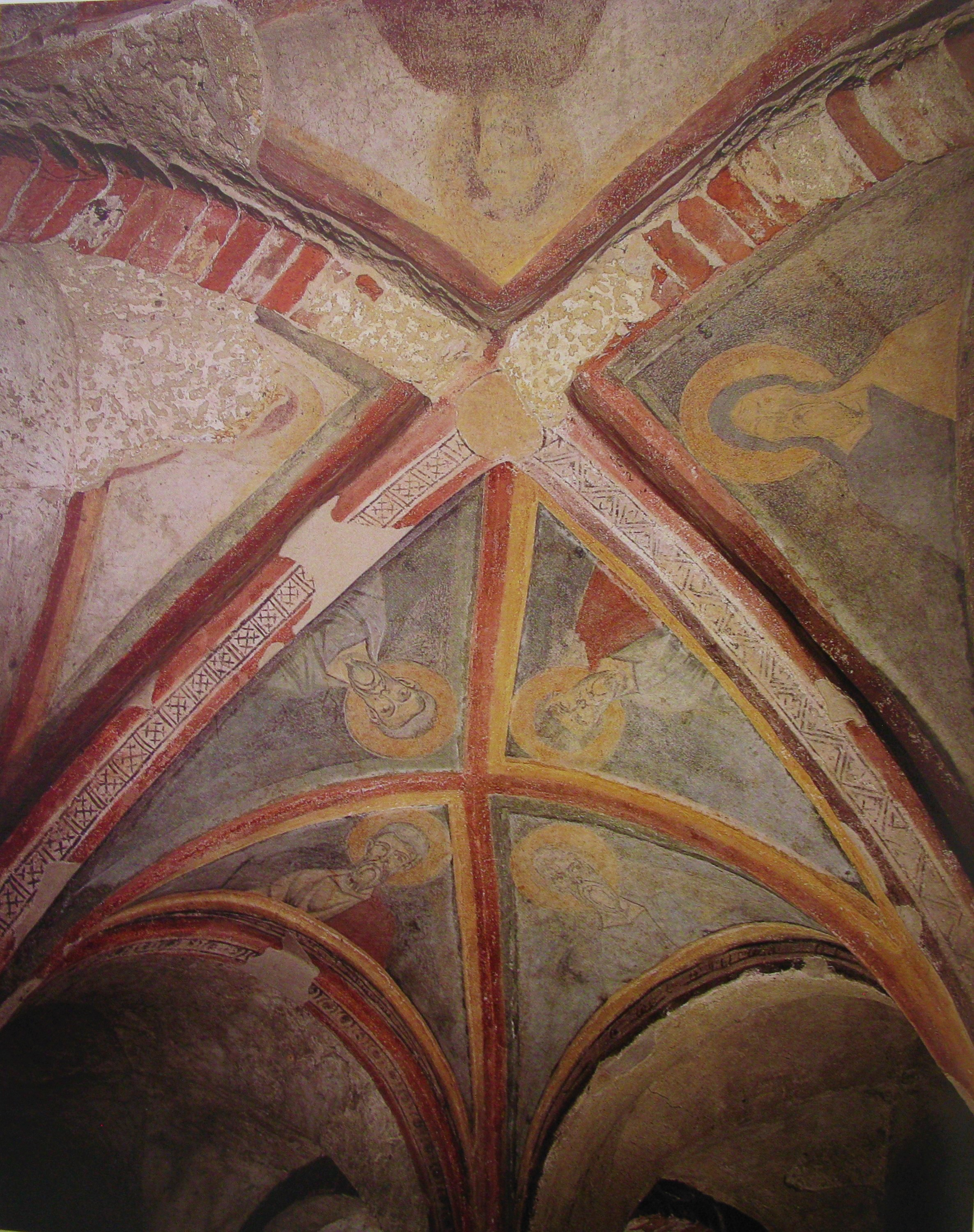
Frescoes in the crypt, 12th century

The Church of Sant'Eusebio is mentioned in Paul the Deacon's Historia Langobardorum. The seventh century apse perimeter remains today. The crypt dates back to the 11th century reconstruction interventions that involved the church, which underwent extensive reconstructions in 1512 and during the 17th century, only to be destroyed and rebuilt again in the 18th century. In 1923, it was decided to definitively demolish it as part of an urban "reorganization" of the area, from which the current Piazza Leonardo da Vinci and the evocative as well as anti-historical isolation of the towers emerged. The crypt, although remodeled in the Romanesque period, still retains some capitals from the Lombard period that show a departure from classical art through original forms inspired by jewellery. It was thought that they were originally covered with glass paste or large colored stones, which would have given a more majestic and graceful aspect to the whole; one is divided into triangular closed fields, reminiscent of the contemporary alveolate fibulae, while a second has longitudinal ovals, similar to large water leaves, which seem to derive from the "cicada" fibulae used in all barbarian jewellery from oriental models. The vaults of the latter preserve frescoes, of Byzantine style, depicting busts of saints dating back to the second half of the 12th century. Visiting the crypt requires contacting the Civic Museums.

== Bibliography ==
- Musei Civici di Pavia. Pavia longobarda e capitale di regno. Secoli VI- X, a cura di S. Lomartire, D. Tolomelli, Skira, Milano, 2017.
- Piero Majocchi, Pavia città regia. Storia e memoria di una capitale altomedievale, Roma, Viella, 2008.
