= Julius Honorius =

Julius Honorius, also known as Julius Orator, was a teacher of geography during Late Antiquity.

He is known only by a single work, Cosmographia, which is a set of notes he had written down by one of his students while he lectured about a world map (sphaera), and by references to this work by later writers such as Cassiodorus. The importance of the Cosmographia is that it is one of very few geographical works of this period in which any reliance can be placed. A number of variant manuscripts exist, which have been studied by Nicolet & Gautier Dalché. The only (relatively) modern print version was as one of a collection of fragmentary texts published by Riese.

Nothing else is known of his life, and even the date of the Cosmographia is not known with certainty. The reference by Cassiodorus puts it prior to the mid 6th century. Modéran, suggests a late 4th century date. Liccardo argues that "the inclusion of the name Constantina (§ 44) for the city otherwise known as Cirta offers 313 CE as the terminus post quem. In that year, the town was renamed after Constantine I, who had just defeated Maxentius and gained control over Roman Africa".

An attempt to reconstruct the sphaera was made by Kubitschek and by Konrad Miller.

== Bibliography ==
- Liccardo, Salvatore (2023), Old Names, New Peoples: Listing Ethnonyms in Late Antiquity, Brill, doi:10.1163/9789004686601
- Monda, S., "La Cosmographia di Giulio Onorio. Un exceptum scolastico tardo-antico", Roma 2008.
- Nicolet, C. & Gautier Dalché, P. "Les quatre sages de Jules César et la mesure du monde selon Julius Honorius", Journal des Savants Oct.-Dec. 1986, 157–218.
- Riese, A. 1878. Geographi latini minores collegit, recensuit, prolegomenis instruxit. Henninger Bros, Heilbronn.
