= Kingdom of Italy (Holy Roman Empire) =

Constituent kingdom of the Holy Roman Empire (962–1801)

Kingdom of Italy Regnum Italiae (Latin) Regno d'Italia (Italian) Königreich Italien (German)
- 962–1801
- Top: Banner (c. 1430–1806); Bottom: Ghibelline flag (12th–13th centuries) Coat of arms

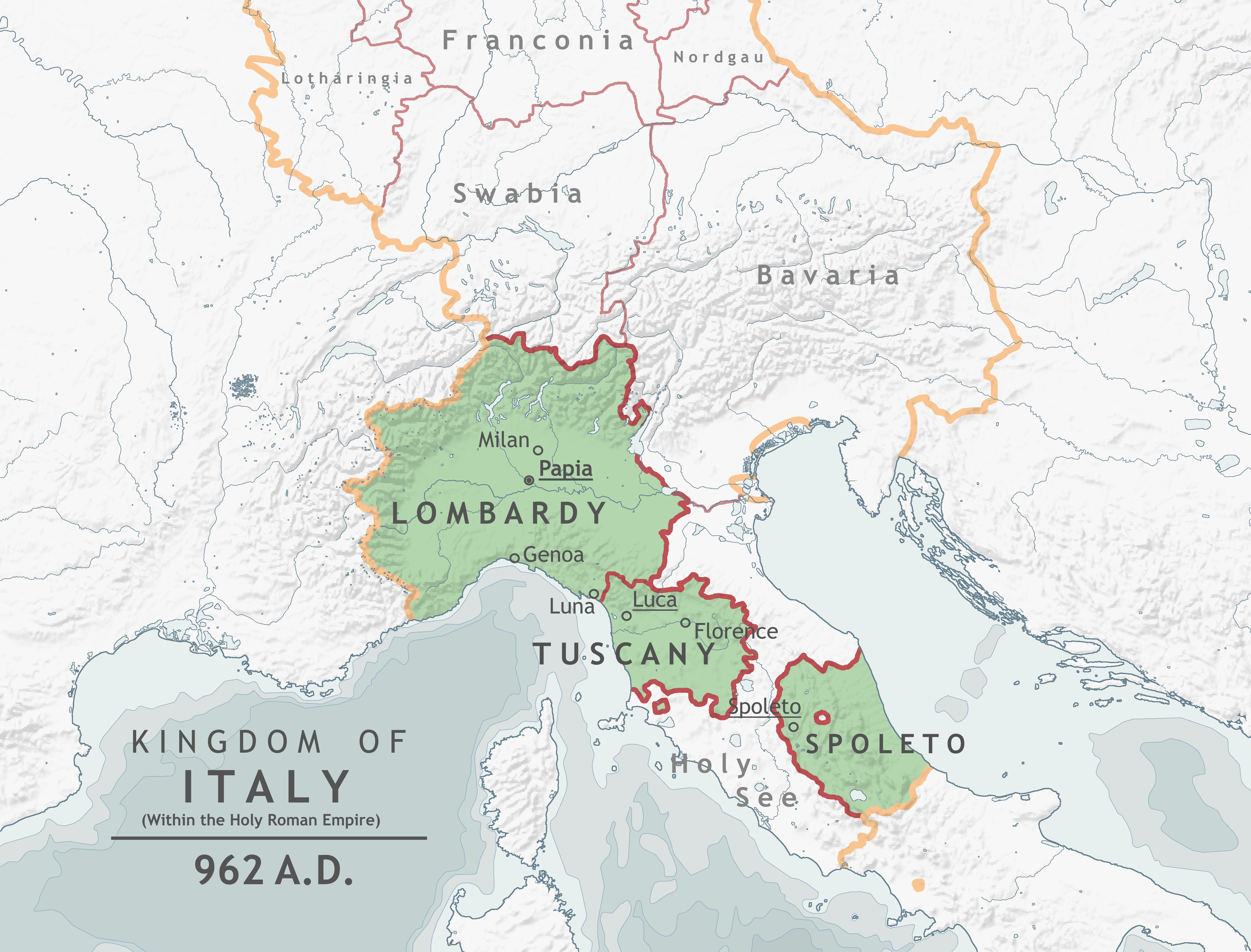
- The Kingdom of Italy within the Holy Roman Empire in 962
- Capital: Pavia (962-1024)
- Government: Non-sovereign elective monarchy
- King
  - 962–973: Otto I
  - 1519–1556: Charles V^{1}
  - 1792–1801: Francis II
- Arch-Chancellor^{2}
  - 962–965 (first): Bruno of Lotharingia
  - 1784–1801 (last): Maximilian Francis of Austria
- Historical era: Middle Ages; Early modern period
  - Treaty of Prüm (Kingdom partitioned from Middle Francia): 19 September 855
  - Imperial Coronation of Otto the Great: 2 February 962
  - Investiture Controversy: 1075–1122
  - Diet of Roncaglia: 1158
  - Guelph–Ghibelline wars: 1216–1392
  - Italian Wars: 1494–1559
  - Treaty of Lunéville: 9 February 1801
Preceded by	Succeeded by
Middle Francia	Italian Republic; Kingdom of Etruria
- Today part of: Italy
- 1. Charles V was the last emperor to be crowned king of Italy, with subsequent emperors removing it from their titles; however, they continued to claim the crown of Italy until 1801.; 2. The archbishop of Cologne was the Arch-Chancellor of Italy, one of the highest dignitaries of the empire.

The Kingdom of Italy, also called Imperial Italy, (Note: (Italian: Italia Imperiale; German: Reichsitalien)) was one of the constituent kingdoms of the Holy Roman Empire, along with the kingdoms of Germany, Bohemia, and Burgundy. It originally comprised large parts of northern and central Italy. Its original capital was Pavia until the 11th century.

Following the fall of the Western Roman Empire in 476 and the brief rule of Odoacer, Italy was ruled by the Ostrogoths and later the Lombards. In 773, Charlemagne, the king of the Franks, crossed the Alps and invaded the Lombard kingdom, which encompassed all of Italy except the Duchy of Rome, the Republic of Venice and the Byzantine possessions in the south. In June 774, the kingdom collapsed and the Franks became masters of northern Italy. The southern areas remained under Lombard control, as the Duchy of Benevento was changed into the independent Principality of Benevento. Charlemagne called himself king of the Lombards and in 800 was crowned emperor in Rome. Members of the Carolingian dynasty continued to rule Italy until the deposition of Charles the Fat in 887, after which they once briefly regained the throne in 894–896.

In 951, King Otto I of Germany, already married to Queen Adelaide of Italy, invaded the kingdom and proclaimed himself king. Otto defeated the previous king and conquered Pavia in 961, and then continued on to Rome, where he had himself crowned emperor in 962. The union of the crowns of Italy and Germany with that of the so-called "Empire of the Romans" proved stable. Burgundy was added to this union in 1032, and by the twelfth century the term "Holy Roman Empire" had come into use to describe it. The emperor was usually also king of Italy and Germany, although emperors sometimes appointed their heirs to rule in Italy and occasionally the Italian bishops and noblemen elected a king of their own in opposition to that of Germany. The absenteeism of the Italian monarch led to the rapid disappearance of a central government in the High Middle Ages, but the idea that Italy was a kingdom within the Empire remained and emperors frequently sought to impose their will on the evolving Italian city-states. The resulting wars between Guelphs and Ghibellines, the anti-imperialist and imperialist factions, respectively, were characteristic of Italian politics in the 12th–14th centuries. The Lombard League was the most famous example of this situation; though not a declared separatist movement, it openly challenged the emperor's claim to power.

The century between the Humiliation of Canossa (1077) and the Treaty of Venice of 1177 resulted in the formation of city states independent of the Germanic emperor. A series of wars in Lombardy from 1423 to 1454 reduced the number of competing states. The next forty years were relatively peaceful in Italy, but in 1494 the peninsula was invaded by France.

After the Imperial Reform of 1495–1512, the Italian kingdom corresponded to the unencircled territories south of the Alps. Juridically the emperor maintained an interest in them as nominal king and overlord, but the "government" of the kingdom consisted of little more than the plenipotentiaries the emperor appointed to represent him and those governors he appointed to rule his own Italian states. The 250 to 300 lesser feudal lords of the Reichsitalien nonetheless frequently appealed to the imperial courts and jurisdiction to settle conflicts with the prominent princes.

The Habsburg rule in several parts of Italy continued in various forms but came to an end with the campaigns of the French Revolutionaries in 1792–1797, when a series of sister republics were set up with local support by Napoleon and then united into the Italian Republic under his presidency. In 1805 the Italian Republic became the Kingdom of Italy with Napoleon as the new king. This state was disbanded with the collapse of Napoleonic rule in 1814.

The modern Italian region of Trentino-Alto Adige/Südtirol and part of Friuli-Venezia Giulia were also located in the Empire, but were not part of the Kingdom of Italy.

== Lombard Kingdom ==
After the Battle of Taginae, in which the Ostrogoth king Totila was killed, the Byzantine general Narses captured Rome and besieged Cumae. Teia, the new Ostrogothic king, gathered the remnants of the Ostrogothic army and marched to relieve the siege, but in October 552 Narses ambushed him at Mons Lactarius (modern Monti Lattari) in Campania, near Mount Vesuvius and Nuceria Alfaterna. The battle lasted two days and Teia was killed in the fighting. Ostrogothic power in Italy was eliminated, but according to Roman historian Procopius of Caesarea, Narses allowed the Ostrogothic population and their Rugian allies to live peacefully in Italy under Roman sovereignty. The absence of any real authority in Italy immediately after the battle led to an invasion by the Franks and Alemanni, but they too were defeated in the Battle of the Volturnus and the peninsula was, for a short time, reintegrated into the empire.

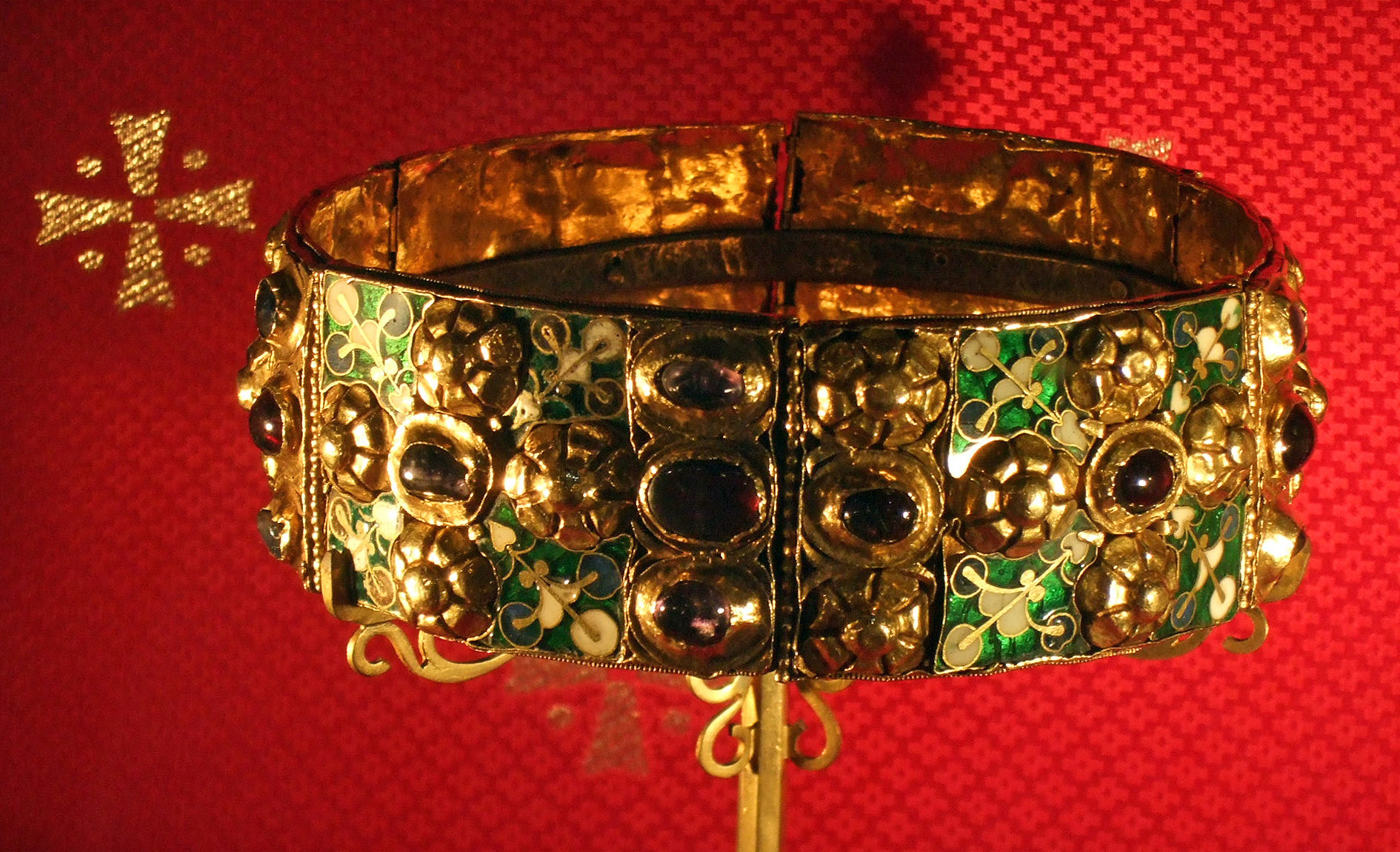
The so-called Iron Crown of Lombardy, a votive crown from the Monza Cathedral said to contain a nail of the Passion, became a symbol of Lombard rule over Italy during the Late Middle Ages and Early Modern period. It was for centuries a symbol of the Kings of Italy

The Kings of the Lombards (Latin: reges Langobardorum, singular rex Langobardorum) ruled those Germanic people from their invasion of Italy in 567–68 until the Lombardic identity became lost in the ninth and tenth centuries. After 568, the Lombard kings sometimes styled themselves Kings of Italy (Latin: rex totius Italiæ).

The actual control of the sovereigns of both the major areas that constitute the kingdom – Langobardia Major in the centre-north (in turn divided into a western, or Neustria, and one eastern, or Austria and Tuskia) and Langobardia Minor in the centre-south, was not constant during the two centuries of life of the kingdom. An initial phase of strong autonomy of the many constituent duchies developed over time with growing regal authority, even if the dukes' desires for autonomy were never fully achieved.

The Lombard kingdom proved to be more stable than its Ostrogothic predecessor, but in 774, on the pretext of defending the Papacy, it was conquered by the Franks under Charlemagne.

== Carolingian Kingdom of Italy ==
Division of the Carolingian Empire after the Treaty of Prüm in 855, with the Italian realm colored in pink

After the conquest of Lombard Kingdom in 774, Charlemagne was crowned as Lombard king, thus establishing a distinctive polity in his Italian possessions, within the wider Carolingian Empire. Already in 781, his young son Pepin was also crowned as Lombard king and designated to rule the Italian realm. King Pepin died in 810, and his son Bernard became the new Lombard king, governing the Italian realm until 817, when he was deposed by his uncle, emperor Louis the Pious. The Italian realm passed to Louis′ son Lothair I, who was also the co-emperor and emperor (817-855). Under the Treaty of Verdun (843), Carolingian Italy became part of the Middle Frankish Kingdom, ruled by emperor Lothair I.

The death of the Emperor Lothair I in 855 led to his realm of Middle Francia being split among his three sons, under the Treaty of Prüm. The eldest, Louis II, inherited the imperial crown, and rule over the Carolingian Italy. His realm included all of Carolingian possessions in northern and central Italy, as far south as Rome and Spoleto, but the rest of Italy to the south was under the rule of the Lombard Principality of Benevento, or the Byzantine Empire.

Following Louis II's death without male heirs (875), both the imperial crown and rule over the Italian realm was disputed among the Carolingian rulers of West Francia (France) and East Francia (Germany), with first the western king (Charles the Bald) and then the eastern claimants (Carloman of Bavaria and Charles the Fat) attaining the prize.

== Post-Carolingian Kingdom of Italy ==
Post-Carolingian Kingdom of Italy and its regions in the middle of the 10th century

Following the deposition and death of emperor Charles the Fat (888), local nobles such as Berengar of Friuli, and his opponents Guy of Spoleto and Lambert of Spoleto, disputed over the Lombard crown and rule in the Italian realm, and outside intervention did not cease, with Arnulf of Eastern Francia and later Louis of Provence both claiming the Imperial throne and rule over Italy, while other contestants for the Lombard crown and consequent rulers of the Italian realm also were Rudolph II of Burgundy (922), Hugh of Arles (926) and his son Lothair II (947), and their opponent Berengar II (950).

During that period, Italy was also beset by Arab raiding parties from Sicily and North Africa, while central royal authority was frequently challenged. Order was finally imposed from outside, when the German king Otto I invaded Italy and seized both the Italian and Imperial thrones for himself in 961-962.

== Imperial Italy ==
In 951, King Otto I of Germany married Adelaide of Burgundy, the widow of late King Lothair II of Italy. Otto was proclaimed king of Italy at Pavia despite his rival Margrave Berengar of Ivrea. In 952, the March of Verona was annexed by the Duchy of Bavaria and remained part of the Kingdom of Germany until its disintegration. When in 960 Berengar attacked the Papal States, King Otto, summoned by Pope John XII, conquered the Italian kingdom and on 2 February 962 had himself crowned Holy Roman Emperor at Rome. From that time on, the Kings of Italy were always also Kings of Germany, and Italy thus became a constituent kingdom of the Holy Roman Empire, along with the Kingdom of Germany (regnum Teutonicorum) and – from 1032 – Burgundy. The German king (Rex Romanorum) would theoretically be crowned in Pavia as a prelude to the visit to Rome to be crowned Emperor by the Pope.

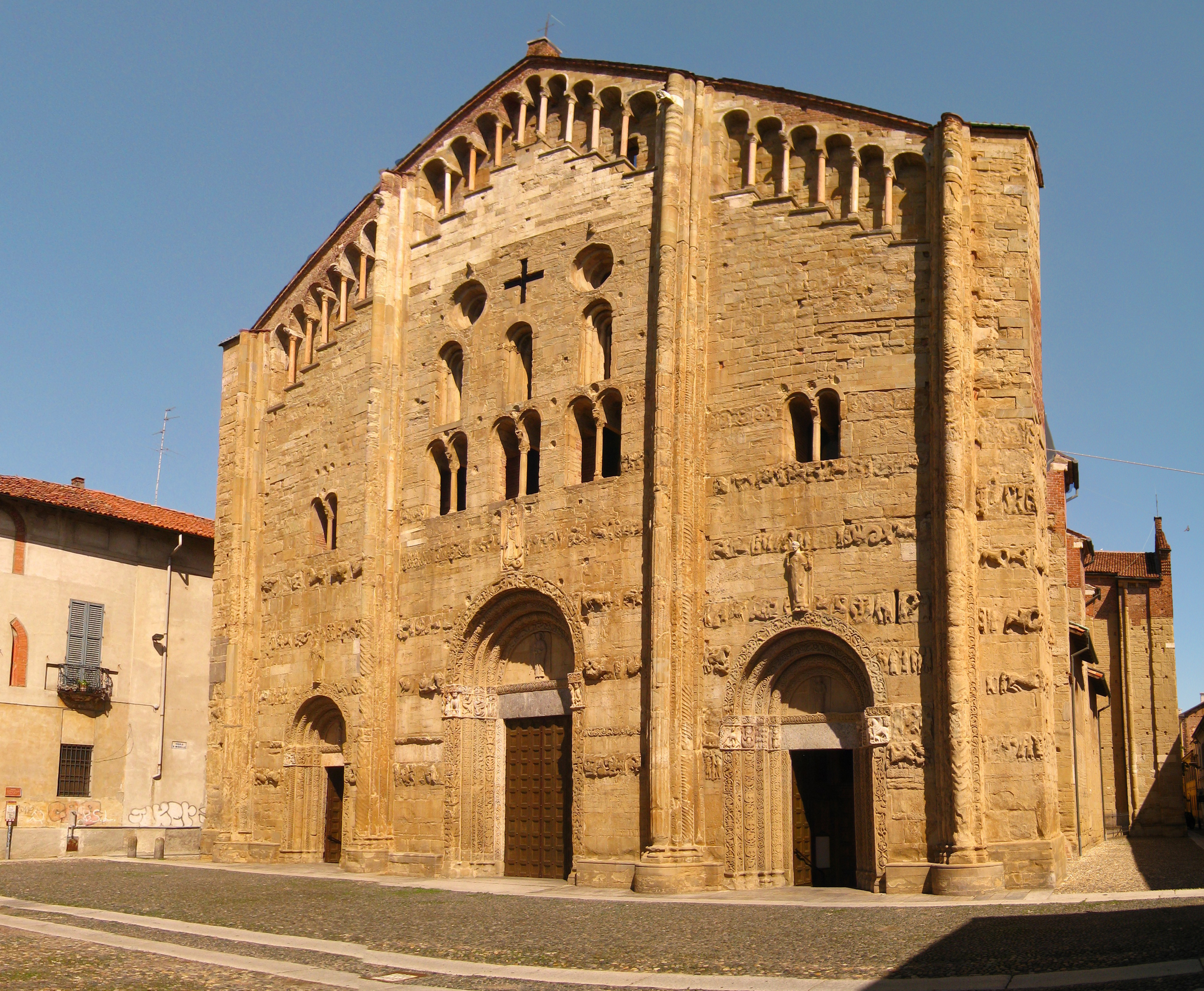
San Michele Maggiore, Pavia, where almost all the kings of Italy were crowned up to Frederick Barbarossa

In general, the monarch was an absentee, spending most of his time in Germany and leaving the Kingdom of Italy with little central authority. There was also a lack of powerful landed magnates – the only notable one being the Margraviate of Tuscany, which had wide lands in Tuscany, Lombardy, and the Emilia, but which failed due to lack of heirs after the death of Matilda of Canossa in 1115. This left a power vacuum – increasingly filled by the Papacy and by the bishops, as well as by the increasingly wealthy Italian cities, which gradually came to dominate the surrounding countryside. Upon the death of Emperor Otto III in 1002, one of late Berengar's successors, Margrave Arduin of Ivrea, even succeeded in assuming the Italian crown and in defeating the Imperial forces under Duke Otto I of Carinthia. Not until 1004 could the new German King Henry II of Germany, by the aid of Bishop Leo of Vercelli, move into Italy to have himself crowned rex Italiae. Arduin ranks as the last domestic "King of Italy" before the accession of Victor Emmanuel II in 1861.

Henry's Salian successor Conrad II tried to confirm his dominion against Archbishop Aribert of Milan and other Italian aristocrats (seniores). While besieging Milan in 1037, he issued the Constitutio de feudis in order to secure the support of the vasvassores petty gentry, whose fiefs he declared hereditary. While Conrad stabilised his rule, however, the Imperial supremacy in Italy remained contested.

=== Staufer ===
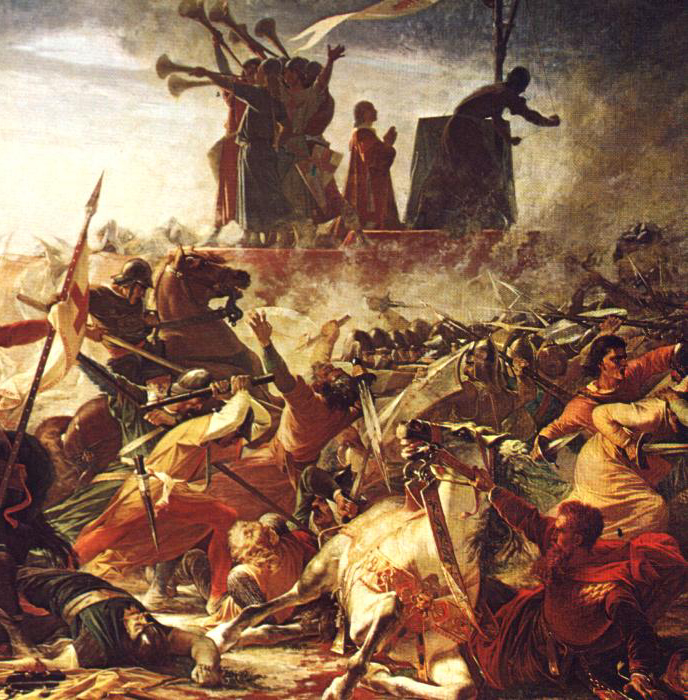
The defense of the Carroccio during the battle of Legnano by Amos Cassioli (1832–1891)

The cities first demonstrated their increasing power during the reign of the Hohenstaufen Emperor Frederick Barbarossa (1152–1190), whose attempts to restore imperial authority in the peninsula led to wars with the Lombard League, a league of northern Italian cities, most of the times headed by Milan, and ultimately to a decisive victory for the League at the Battle of Legnano in 1176, that had as its leader the Milanese Guido da Landriano, which forced Frederick to make administrative, political, and judicial concessions to the municipalities, officially ending his attempt to dominate Northern Italy. From then, Italy became a patchwork of autonomous duchies and city-states only nominally tied to the Holy Roman Empire.

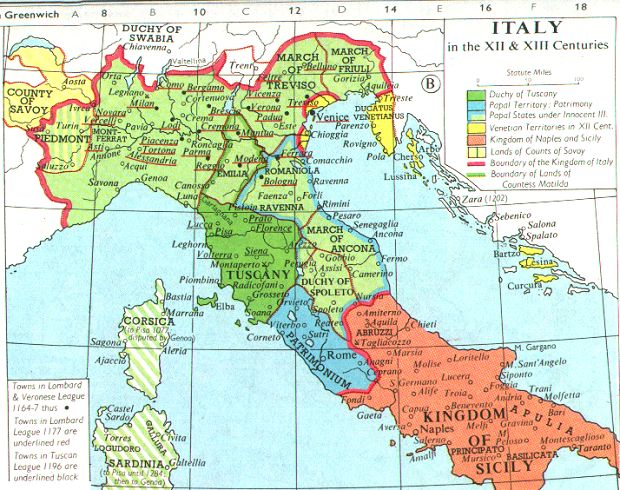
Imperial Italy (outlined in red) in the 12th century

The scene was similar to that which had occurred between Pope Gregory VII and Henry IV, Holy Roman Emperor at Canossa a century earlier. The conflict was the same as that resolved in the Concordat of Worms. Did the Holy Roman Emperor have the power to name the pope and bishops? The Investiture controversy from previous centuries had been brought to a tendentious peace with the Concordat of Worms and affirmed in the First Council of the Lateran. Now it had recurred, in a slightly different form. Frederick had to humble himself before Pope Alexander III at Venice. The emperor acknowledged the pope's sovereignty over the Papal States, and in return Alexander acknowledged the emperor's overlordship of the Imperial Church. Also in the Treaty of Venice, a truce was made with the Lombard cities, which took effect in August 1178. The grounds for a permanent peace were not established until 1183 in the Peace of Constance, when Frederick conceded their right freely to elect town magistrates. By this move, Frederick recovered his nominal domination over Italy, which became his chief means of applying pressure on the papacy.

Frederick's son Henry VI managed to extend Hohenstaufen authority in Italy by his conquest of the Norman Kingdom of Sicily, which comprised Sicily and all of Southern Italy. Henry's son, Frederick II, Holy Roman Emperor – one of the greatest monarchs of the Middle Ages and the first emperor since the 10th century to actually base himself in Italy – attempted to return to his father's task of restoring imperial authority in the northern Italian Kingdom. This incurred fierce opposition from a reformed Lombard League and from the Popes, who had become increasingly jealous of their temporal realm in central Italy (theoretically a part of the Empire), and concerned about the hegemonic ambitions of the Hohenstaufen emperors.

Frederick II was one of the most powerful figures of the Middle Ages and ruled a vast area, beginning with the kingdom of Sicily in the south and stretching through Italy all the way north to Germany. Given the appellation Stupor mundi ('Wonder of the World') by contemporaries, he seemed to view himself as a direct successor to the Roman emperors of antiquity. Frederick would prove the architect of an administratively unified Italian state until the mid-19th century. In the Kingdom of Sicily he built upon the work of his Norman predecessors and forged an early absolutist state bound together by an efficient secular bureaucracy. Frederick's firm grip on his kingdom would survive invasion, conspiracy, excommunications, and wars in Lombardy and the Papacy.

Basing himself in the Regno, the emperor could call also on a powerful source of wealth and manpower unprecedented among his predecessors to press his ambitions in northern Italy. In 1237, Frederick II won a crushing victory over the Lombard League at the Battle of Cortenuova and imperial power in Lombardy appeared more powerful than ever. Despite his perennial conflict with the papacy and a few remaining stubborn Lombard cities, Frederick remained in a commanding overall position. From 1240, in an edict issued at Foggia, Frederick II was determined to push through far-reaching reforms to establish the Sicilian kingdom and Imperial Italy as a unified state bound by a centralized administration. He had already appointed his son Enzo of Sardinia as Legate General for all of Italy in the previous year and he now appointed several imperial vicars and captains-general to govern the provinces. The function of the imperial vicars as military commanders and regional governors chosen for their loyalty and competence has been compared to Napoleonic marshals, and Frederick proactively supervised his cadre of officials.

Frederick also placed loyal Sicilian barons as podestàs over the subject cities of northern and central Italy. The unified administration was taken over directly by the emperor and his highly trained Sicilian officials whose jurisdiction now ranged across all of Italy. Henceforth, the new High Court of Justice would be supreme in both the Kingdom of Sicily and Imperial Italy. A central exchequer was established at Melfi to oversee financial management. Frederick also made efforts towards regulating education, commerce, and even medicine, similar to his earlier reforms in Sicily. For the rest of his reign, there was a continuous movement toward the extension and perfection of this new unified administrative system, with the Emperor himself as the driving force.

Despite his mighty efforts however, Frederick's newly unified Italian state ultimately proved ephemeral. When he died in December 1250, in spite of setbacks at the Battle of Parma and the Battle of Fossalta during the previous two years, imperial power throughout Italy remained considerable and strong, and the emperor was in the ascendant against his enemies once again. Frederick's unified imperial Italo-Sicilian regime broadly controlled the regions of Tuscany, Ancona, Spoleto, Piedmont, the Romagna, and most of Lombardy, as well as all of southern Italy. The remaining pro-Guelph cities in the north proved difficult to assault behind networks of defensive works, however, and resistance to imperial rule persisted. Even with imperial successes and the broad recovery of areas lost to the Guelphs in the previous two years, the conflict was locked in stalemate. Yet, so long as the great emperor lived, his legendary status and pre-eminence in Europe seemed like it could sustain the imperial cause.

The collapse of the Hohenstaufen came after the emperor's death. Robbed of his genius for state-building in its formative years, and struck by crises in the reigns of his successors, Frederick's work did not long survive him and Italian unification stalled until the 19th century. Nevertheless, the vicars and captains-general provided the prototype for the great Signori who dominated Italy in later generations and centuries. Each, such as Charles of Anjou, the Neapolitan kings Robert, Ladislaus, and Ferrante of Naples, or the Visconti in Milan, were in many ways aspiring Italian hegemons in Frederick's image, claiming for themselves a measure of his awesome prestige and might—some even continued to claim the title of imperial vicar. Not until the eras of Emperor Charles V and, later, Napoleon would a single ruler so dominate all of Italy.

=== Decline ===
Imperial Italy within the Holy Roman Empire in 1356

The Italian campaigns of the Holy Roman emperors decreased, but the kingdom did not become wholly meaningless. In 1310 the Luxembourg King Henry VII of Germany with 5,000 men again crossed the Alps, moved into Milan and had himself crowned king of Italy (with a mock-up of the Iron Crown), sparking a Guelph rebellion under Lord Guido della Torre. Henry restored the rule of Matteo I Visconti and proceeded to Rome, where he was crowned emperor by three cardinals in place of Pope Clement V in 1312. His further plans to restore the Imperial rule in northern Italy and to expand the empire, invading the Kingdom of Naples, were aborted by his sudden death the next year.

Successive emperors in the 14th and 15th centuries were bound in the struggle between the rivaling Luxembourg, Habsburg and Wittelsbach dynasties. In the conflict with Frederick the Fair, King Louis IV (reigned until 1347) had himself crowned emperor in Rome by Antipope Nicholas V in 1328. His successor Charles IV also returned to Rome to be crowned in 1355. None of the emperors forgot their theoretical claims to dominion as kings of Italy. Nor did the Italians themselves forget the claims of the emperors to universal dominion: writers like Dante Alighieri (died 1321) and Marsilius of Padua (c. 1275 – c. 1342) expressed their commitment both to the principle of universal monarchy, and to the actual pretensions of Emperors Henry VII and Louis IV, respectively.

The Imperial claims to dominion in Italy mostly manifested themselves, however, in the granting of titles to the various strongmen who had begun to establish their control over the formerly republican cities. Most notably, the emperors gave their backing to the Visconti of Milan, and King Wenceslaus made Gian Galeazzo Visconti the duke of Milan in 1395. Other families to receive new titles from the emperors were the Gonzaga of Mantua, and the Este of Modena and Reggio.

=== Imperial fiefs in the modern period ===
By the beginning of the early modern period, the Kingdom of Italy still formally existed but had de facto splintered into completely independent and self-governing Italian city-states. Its territory had been significantly limited – the conquests of the Republic of Venice in the "domini di Terraferma" and those of the Papal States had taken most of northeastern and central Italy outside the jurisdiction of the Empire.

In many aspects, the Imperial claims to feudal overlordship over the Italian territories had become practically meaningless: the effective political authority, as well as the power to raise taxes and spend resources, was in the hands of the Italian princes and dukes. However, the presence of the Imperial feudal network in Italy continued to play a role in the history of the peninsula. It gave to Emperors Sigismund and Maximilian I the pretext to intervene in Italian affairs. Furthermore, the Imperial rights were notably asserted during the Italian Wars by Charles V (also king of Spain, Naples and archduke of Austria). He drove the French from Milan after the Battle of Pavia, and prevented an attempt by the Italian princes, with French aid, to reassert their independence in the League of Cognac. His mutinous troops sacked Rome and, coming to terms with the Medici Pope Clement VII, conquered Florence where he reinstalled the Medici as dukes of Florence after a siege. Charles V was crowned king of Italy with the Iron Crown in medieval fashion and, upon the extinction of the Sforza line of Milan in 1535, claimed direct possession of that territory as an Imperial fief. After Charles divided his possession between a Spanish and Austrian branch, Milan became a possession of the Spanish Empire of Charles's son Philip II of Spain, whereas the title of Holy Roman Emperor and the rights connected to Imperial Italy were transferred to Charles's brother, Ferdinand I. Milan continued to be a state of the Holy Roman Empire so that, in his position as duke of Milan, Philip II was, at least formally, a vassal of Emperor Ferdinand. However, following the reign of Charles V, no Holy Roman Emperor of the Austrian Habsburgs was crowned king of Italy and the title effectively ceased to be used for two centuries and a half.

In 1559, the Kingdom of France ended its ambitions over the Imperial fiefs in Italy, abandoning its claims to Savoy and Milan and withdrawing from Tuscany and Genoese Corsica by the terms of the Treaty of Cateau-Cambrésis. The major imperial fiefs in Italy were known as "Feuda latina", whereas the smaller ones were known as "Feuda Minora". Italian princes did not send representatives to the Imperial Diet, but their forces also joined the Imperial Army, as in the case of the Hungarian campaign of Maximilian II against Suleiman the Magnificent in 1566.

While they were excluded from the Reichstag, the Italian states were still considered vassals of the emperor, like other states of the empire, and thus subject to certain obligations and jurisdiction. A special Italian section of the Aulic Council (one of the two supreme courts of the Empire) was created in 1559. It handled 1,500 cases from Imperial Italy between 1559 and 1806 (out of 140,000 total), with most of those cases coming from later dates. Italian states provided significant support in all of the Empire's wars in this time, either under their own princes or as part of the Habsburg territories (such as the Imperial Free City of Trieste, the County of Gorizia and Gradisca, the Duchy of Milan, and later the Grand Duchy of Tuscany). Unlike most of the German states, the Imperial Italian contributions bypassed the Reichstag and other institutions and went directly to the Imperial army and treasury. The Italian states were in large part autonomous, but their lack of representation gave the emperor greater ability to act more autonomously with the Italian principalities than the German ones, such as when he decided to simply add the Grand Duchy of Tuscany (officially an imperial fief) to his family's lands after the extinction of the Medici ruling line in 1737. Aside from the Prince-Bishopric of Trent, Piedmont-Savoy was the only independent Italian state represented in the Reichstag and also the only one to be part of the circle system (being within the Upper Rhenish Circle; the Habsburg possessions of Trieste and Gorizia-Gradisca were within the Austrian Circle, as was Trent). Thus despite being opposed to the Habsburg family, it still emphasized its imperial privileges to establish itself as suzerain over smaller surrounding lordships. In 1713 the dukes of Savoy also became kings through their holdings outside the Empire (first gaining the Kingdom of Sicily in 1713, swapped in 1720 for the Kingdom of Sardinia).

Imperial authority was used by the Austrian Habsburgs to intervene in Italy during the War of Mantuan Succession phase of the Thirty Years' War and to take control of vacant Italian imperial fiefs during the European Wars of Succession of the 18th century: following the extinction of the Spanish Habsburgs in 1700, the emperor proclaimed Milan a vacant Imperial fief and added it to his direct Austrian dominions in 1707 (confirmed by the Treaty of Rastatt at the end of the War of the Spanish Succession); the Gonzaga of Mantua were deposed by the Imperial Diet in 1708 on charges of felony towards the Holy Roman Emperor; following the extinction of the Florentine House of Medici in 1737, Francis of Lorraine was invested with the Grand Duchy of Tuscany by Imperial diploma; a similar use of Imperial rights allowed the Habsburgs to assert sovereignty over the Duchy of Parma between 1735 and 1748, although this caused a dispute with the Papacy, which claimed it as a Papal fief.

Emperor Leopold I increasingly asserted his rights over the imperial fiefdoms of Italy from the 1660s with the decline of Spanish power and more overt intervention of the French. In 1687, a new plenipotentiary of Italy was appointed, a position that had been left vacant for over a century prior (the powers of the office had instead been exercised haphazardly by the Aulic Council). In 1690, Prince Eugene of Savoy tried to levy an imperial tax over Italy to pay for war expenses, the first time such a thing had been done. Then, in 1696, Leopold issued an edict mandating all of his Italian vassals to renew their oaths of allegiance within a year and a day on pain of forfeit. The renewal of fiefdoms incensed the papacy, some of whose own vassals now dug out ancient documents ostensibly proving them to be vassals of the Emperor. Smaller states of Italy saw the Emperor as their protector against larger territories like Savoy and the papacy. Imperial authority strengthened throughout the 18th century, with the duchies of Milan and Mantua passing to the Habsburg family as vacant imperial fiefs during the War of the Spanish Succession, the end of the War of the Quadruple Alliance reconfirming the statuses of Tuscany, Modena-Reggio, and Parma-Piacenza as imperial fiefs, and the Habsburgs continuing to rule the Italian territories of their hereditary lands (roughly the modern provinces of Trentino-Alto Adige and the Austrian Littoral). Piedmont-Savoy, on the other hand, mostly remained defiant of Habsburg authority despite the duke receiving the title of "Royal Highness" from the Emperor in 1693, but still recognized the Empire as a valid institution and officially participated in the diet.

=== Dissolution ===
Kingdom of Italy in 1789

The status of Imperial Italy was more or less stable up to 1789. There was even a serious push by the Savoyards (backed by Prussia) to raise Savoy to electorate status in 1788, which would make it only the second non-German state to become so (after Bohemia, which was after the crushing of Bohemian estates in 1620 dominated by German-speaking aristocrats). This came to nothing as the French Revolution of 1789 would quickly shatter the old order.

During the French Revolutionary Wars, the Austrians were driven from Italy by Napoleon Bonaparte, who set up republics throughout northern Italy, and by the Treaty of Campo Formio of 1797, Emperor Francis II relinquished any claims over the territories that made up the Kingdom of Italy. The imperial reorganization carried out in 1799–1803 left no room for Imperial claims to Italy – even the Archbishop of Cologne was gone, secularized along with the other ecclesiastical princes.

Napoleon's victory in the War of the Second Coalition saw this reconfirmed in the Treaty of Lunéville. In 1805, while the Holy Roman Empire was still in existence, Napoleon, by now Emperor of the French as Napoleon I, claimed the crown of the new Kingdom of Italy for himself, putting the Iron Crown on his head at Milan on 26 May 1805. He also directly annexed most of the former Imperial Italy (including Piedmont-Savoy, Genoa and Tuscany) into France. The Empire itself was abolished the next year on 6 August 1806. The Congress of Vienna following Napoleon's defeat did not bring back the Holy Roman Empire nor the Kingdom of Italy, and the restored Italian kingdoms and duchies now either became fully sovereign in their own right or became a part of the newly-declared Austrian Empire (which also annexed the former Venetian Republic).

=== Demographics ===
Italian states by population, 1600; Imperial Italian states in italics
State	Population
Kingdom of Naples (Spanish)	3,000,000
Republic of Venice	1,870,000
Papal States	1,704,500
Duchy of Milan (Spanish)	1,328,000
Kingdom of Sicily (Spanish)	1,100,000
Piedmont-Savoy	900,000
Grand Duchy of Tuscany	766,000
Republic of Genoa	500,000
Duchy of Ferrara	432,000
Duchy of Mantua	367,000
Duchy of Parma-Piacenza	350,000
County of Gorizia and Gradisca (Austrian)	130,000
Republic of Lucca	100,000
Total	c. 13,000,000
Total Imperial	c. 5,000,000 (38%)

== See also ==
- King of Italy
- Holy Roman Empire
- Italy in the Middle Ages

== Sources ==
- Anonymous, Panegyricus Berengarii imperatoris (10th century) [Mon.Germ.Hist., Script., V, p. 196].
- Anonymous, Widonis regis electio [Mon.Germ.Hist., Script., III, p. 554].
- Anonymous, Gesta Berengarii imperatoris [ed. Dumueler, Halle 1871].
- Balzaretti, Ross (2016). "Narratives of success and narratives of failure: Representations of the career of King Hugh of Italy (c. 885–948)". Early Medieval Europe. 24 (2): 185–208.
- Houghton, Robert (2020). "Hugh, Lothar and Berengar: The balance of power in Italy 945–50". Journal of Medieval History. 46 (1): 50–76.
- Kantorowicz, Ernst (1937). Frederick the Second, 1194–1250. New York: Frederick Ungar.
- Kreutz, Barbara M. (1996). Before the Normans: Southern Italy in the Ninth and Tenth Centuries. Philadelphia: University of Pennsylvania Press.
- Le Goff, J. (2000). Medieval Civilization, 400–1500. New York: Barnes and Noble.
- Liutprand, Antapodoseos sive rerum per Europam gestarum libri VI.
- Liutprand, Liber de rebus gestis Ottonis imperatoris.
- MacLean, Simon (2003). Kingship and Politics in the Late Ninth Century: Charles the Fat and the end of the Carolingian Empire. New York: Cambridge University Press.
- MacLean, Simon (2010). "Legislation and Politics in Late Carolingian Italy: The Ravenna Constitutions". Early Medieval Europe. 18 (4): 394–416.
- McKitterick, Rosamond (1983). The Frankish Kingdoms Under the Carolingians, 751-987. Harlow: Longman.
- Riché, Pierre (1993). The Carolingians: A Family Who Forged Europe. Philadelphia: University of Pennsylvania Press.
- Rosenwein, Barbara H. (1996). "The Family Politics of Berengar I, King of Italy (888–924)". Speculum. 71 (2): 247–289.
- Van Cleve, T. C. (1972). The Emperor Frederick II of Hohenstaufen: Immutator Mundi. Oxford. ISBN 0-198-22513-X.
- Wickham, Chris (1981). Early Medieval Italy: Central Power and Local Society, 400-1000. Totowa, NJ: Barnes & Noble.
- Wilson, Peter (2016). Heart of Europe: A History of the Holy Roman Empire. Cambridge: Harvard University Press.
