= Cesina (surname) =

Origin
- Languages: Late Latin and Lombardic
- Meaning: Silva caesa (Latin) or Silva caedua (Latin); Selva tagliata (Italian) or Bosco ceduo (Italian); Woodland cutted (English) or Coppice (English)
- Region of origin: Kingdom of the Lombards Duchy of Benevento Italy

Other names
- Variant forms: Cesi, Cesino, Cesini

Cesina is an Italian surname.

Cesina family has Roman-Lombard origins, members are present in some Italian regions in Campania, Lombardy, Emilia Romagna, Marche, Piedmont and Liguria.

Notable people with the surname include:

- Carlo Cesina (1936–2025), Italian rally co-driver. In 1974 he competed together with rally driver Antonio Codognelli in the 1974 Rallye Sanremo, #4 WRC rally on Lancia Fulvia 1.3 Coupé HF.

== See also ==
- Cesina, is a toponym of Langobard or late Latin origin, used in southern Italy
- Cesina Bermudes (1908–2001), a Portuguese obstetrician
