= Cesina =

Cesina is a toponym of Langobard origin that is used in southern Italy, especially in Campania. It derives from the Latin word caesi and the Latin verb caedere, to which the Langobard suffix -na is added.

== History ==
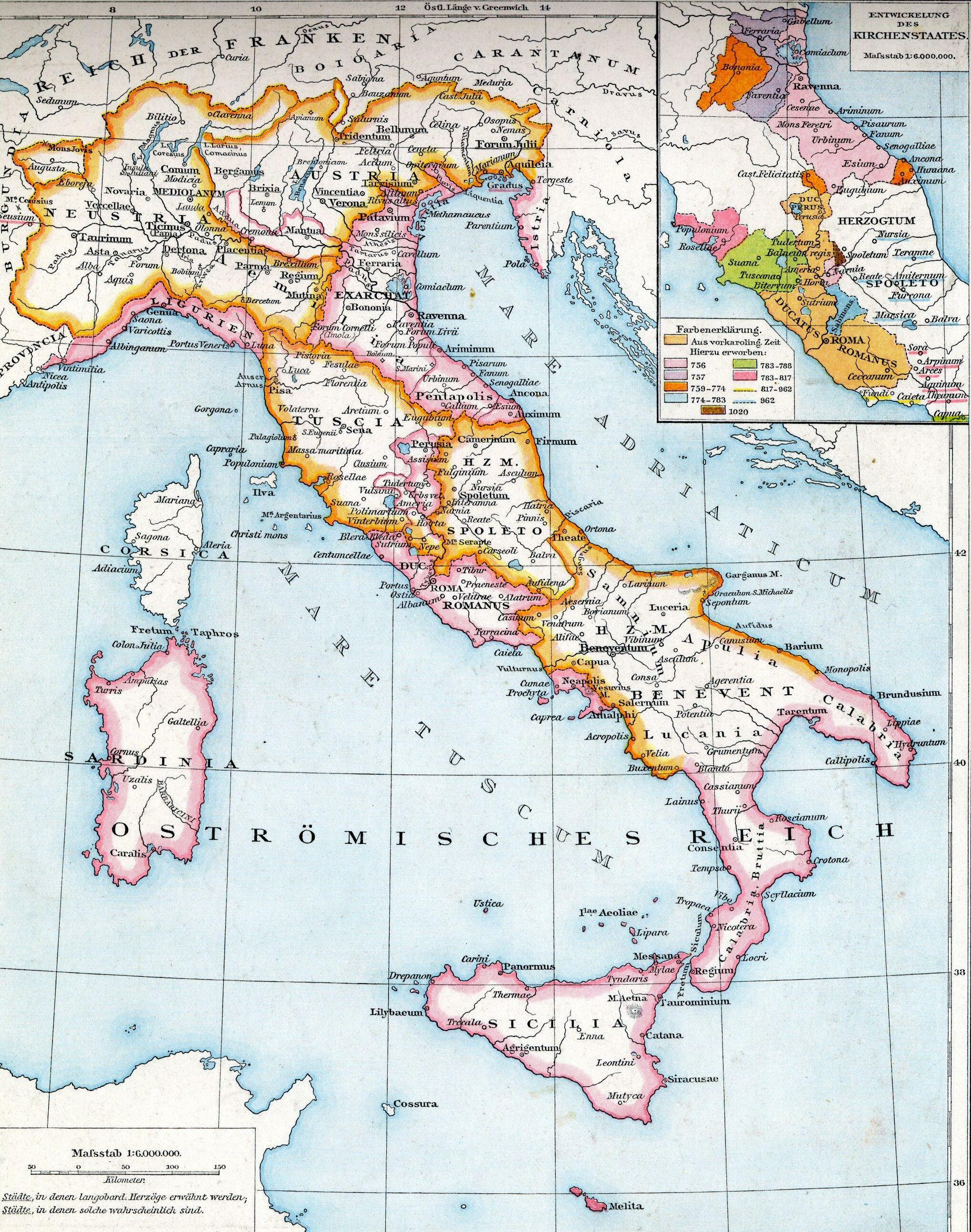
Lombard possessions in Italy: The Lombard Kingdom (Neustria, Austria and Tuscia) and the Lombard Duchies of Spoleto and Benevento

The concept was introduced with the creation of the Duchy of Benevento by the Lombards around 590 AD. It defined a wooded area designated for coppicing. These are precisely defined in the first tome of Antiquitates Italicae Medii Aevi, year 1005 AD, column 183 written by Ludovico Antonio Muratori in 1738–43. It was then further defined as Silva cædua (Latin) in the Du Cange, et al., Glossarium mediae et infimae Latinitatis, Niort: L. Favre, 1883–1887 (10 vol.). These wooded areas were often deforested to make room for urban settlements and cultivated countryside.

== Places called Cesina ==
Places called Cesina include:

- Cesina, ancient fiefdom owned by Di Sangro family.
- Cesina, Capri, Naples, Campania
- Contrada Cesina, Molinara, Benevento, Campania
- Contrada Cesina, Tufino, Naples, Campania
- Contrada Cesina Nuova, Avellino, Campania
- Contrada Cesina, Viggianello, Potenza, Basilicata
- Via Cesina, San Pietro, Montoro, Avellino, Campania
- Via Cesina, San Valentino Torio, Salerno, Campania
- Via Cesina Pugliano, San Valentino Torio, Salerno, Campania
- Via Cesina, Striano, Naples, Campania
- Via Cesina, San Marzano sul Sarno, Salerno, Campania
- Via Cesina, Marano di Napoli, Naples, Campania
- Via Cesina, Piano di Sorrento, Naples, Campania
- Via Belvedere Cesina, Capri, Naples, Campania
- Via Cesina, Capri, Naples, Campania
- Via Cesina, Capaccio Paestum, Salerno, Campania
- Strada della Cesina, Latina, Lazio
- I.C. San Rocco-San Marco-Cesina, Marano di Napoli, Naples, Campania

== Places with names derived from Cesina ==
Cesinali, Avellino, Campania, southern Italy is derived from the toponym.

The term Cesine is used to refer to it as a plural. Charles II of Spain had granted his doctor, Raimondo di Odiboni, the Cesine of Afragola as a fief for services rendered. The Cesine were once wooded land that were converted to farmland by cutting the trees and burning their trunks.

Places called Cesine include:

- Cesine, Benevento, Campania
- Cesine, Avellino, Campania
- Cesine, Potenza, Basilicata
- Via Cesine, Benevento, Campania
- Via Cesine, Avellino, Campania
- Via Cesine Prata di Principato Ultra, Avellino, Campania
- Via Cesine, Tocco Caudio, Benevento, Campania
- Via Cesine Di Sopra, Cerreto Sannita, Benevento, Campania
- Via cesine di sotto, Cerreto Sannita, Benevento, Campania
- Via Cesine, Castelvenere, Benevento, Campania
- Via Cesine, Marsicovetere, Potenza, Basilicata
- Via Cesine, Vallata, Avellino, Campania
- Le Cesine, Lecce, Apulia, southern Italy.

In central Italy the toponym contracts in Cesi, Terni, which gives origin to Cesi (surname).

Other derivatives from the toponym in Northern Italy include:

- Cesano Boscone, Milan, Lombardy
- Cesano Maderno, Monza Brianza, Lombardy
- Cesana Torinese, Turin, Piedmont
- Sauze di Cesana, Turin, Piedmont
- Cesana Brianza, Lecco, Lombardy

The Italian municipality of Cesa, Caserta, Campania originates from the toponym.

== Places with names not derived from Cesina ==
Cesena, an Italian municipality, does not derive from this toponym but from the Latin suffix -caes ('cut'), which refers to a river and not trees.

Cesino, a frazione of the city of Genoa, in the Pontedecimo district, derives from the Ligurian word çêxin, which in Italian means "small cherry tree."

== See also ==
- The dictionary definition of Cesina at Wiktionary
- Češina Strana, a village in Bosnia and Herzegovina
