= Austria (Lombard) =

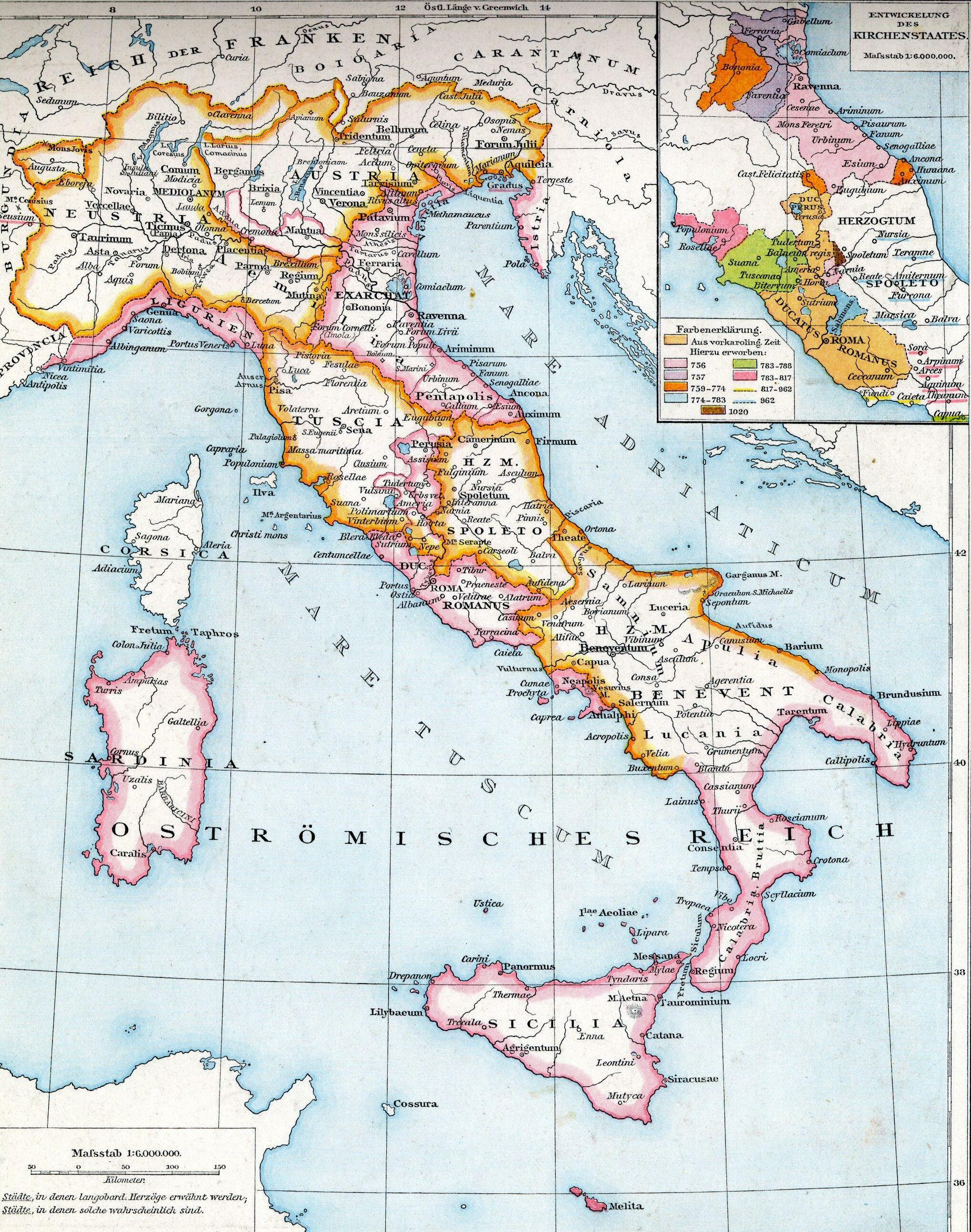
Lombard possessions in Italy: the Lombard Kingdom (Neustria, Austria and Tuscia) and the Lombard Duchies of Spoleto and Benevento

Austria was, according to the early medieval geographical classification, the eastern portion of Langobardia Major, the north-central part of the Lombard Kingdom, extended from the Adda to Friuli and opposite to Neustria. The partition had not only been territorial, but also implied significant cultural and political differences.

== Territory ==
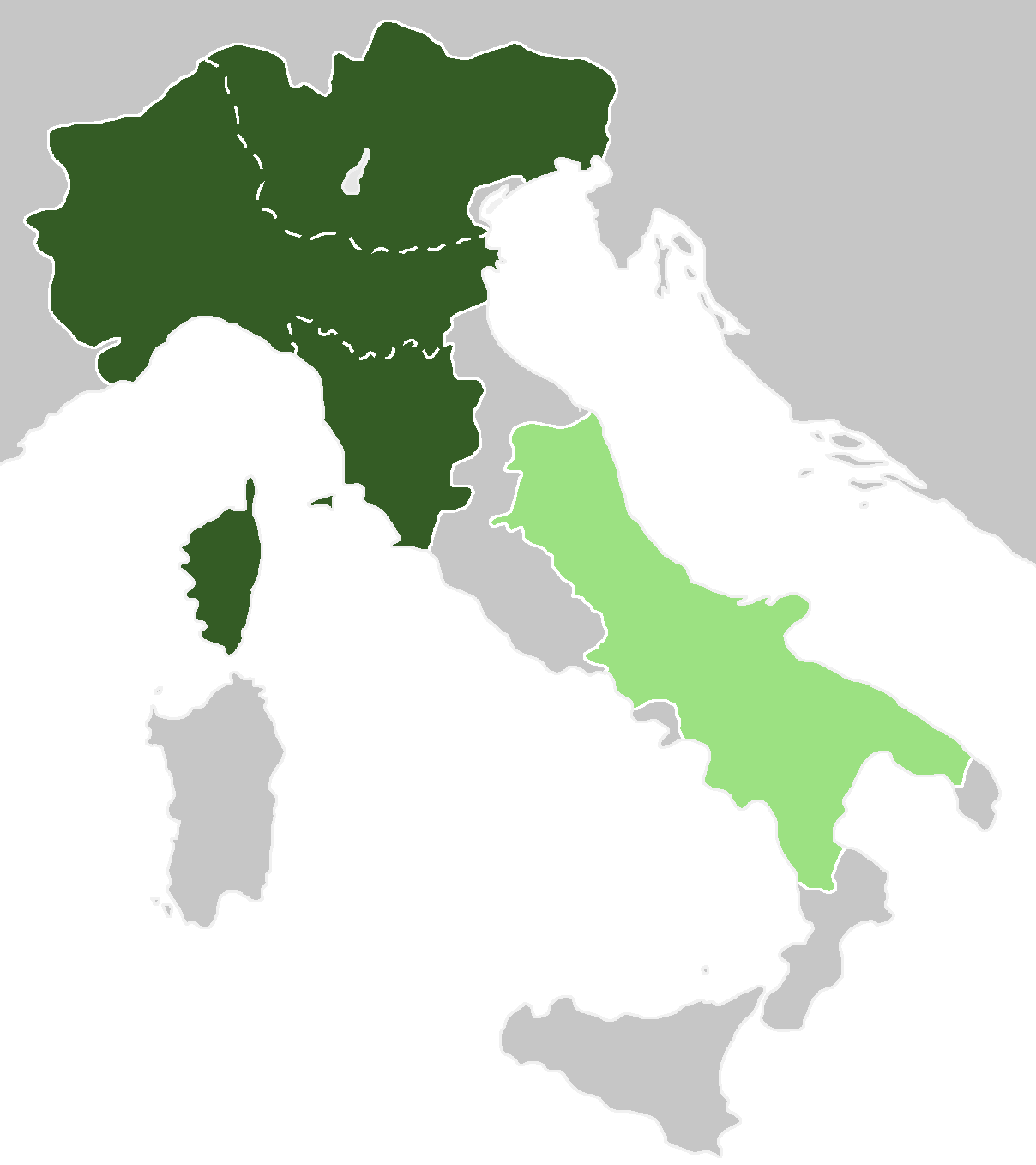
Austria was the eastern of the 3 northern Lombard areas.

Austria included the duchies of the north-eastern Lombard Kingdom. Among them a prominent role was played by:

- Duchy of Friuli
- Duchy of Verona
- Duchy of Trent
- Duchy of Brescia
- Duchy of Bergamo

== History ==
The duchies of Austria presented themselves as the defenders of the warrior and conqueror spirit of the Lombards. Here survived longer than in other places the old pagan cults and among the converts to Christianity, many were adherents of Arianism or adherents to the Schism of the Three Chapters. The Dukes of Austria pressed repeatedly on the king to take initiative, coming in several times to hatch conspiracies to overthrow the legitimate sovereign. This was the case in 662 of Grimoald (duke of Benevento, but a son of a Duke of Friuli), who managed to usurp the throne of Godepert and Perctarit despite the opposition of the Neustrians dukes of Asti and Turin; of Alahis, Duke of Trent, who in 688-689 was able to seize the throne of Pavia before being defeated by Cunipert; of Ansfrid of Friuli, who, having usurped the Duchy of Friuli, in turn attempted to seize the throne of Cunipert (who defeated and killed him in 698); of Rotarit, Duke of Bergamo, who after the death of Cunipert objected unsuccessfully to Raginpert first and then Aripert II (700-702). In the 8th century, however, the widespread conversion of the Lombards to Catholicism smoothed the opposition between Austria and Neustria, thanks to a revived expansion at the expense of the Byzantine Empire with the Catholic and Neustrian Liutprand (king from 712).

After the fall of the Lombard kingdom in 774, the Langobardia Maior fell entirely under the dominion of the Franks. Its political-administrative structure was not disrupted. However, Frankish and Lombard counts replaced the dukes of Austria.

== See also ==
- Langobardia Major
- Langobardia Minor
- Neustria (Lombard)
- Lombard Kingdom

== Bibliography ==
=== Primarie sources ===
- Origo gentis Langobardorum, ed. Georg Waitz in Monumenta Germaniae Historica SS rer. Lang.
- Paul Deacon, Historia Langobardorum (Storia dei Longobardi, cura e commento di Lidia Capo, Lorenzo Valla/Mondadori, Milan 1992).

=== Storiographic literature ===
- Lidia Capo. Comment to Paul Deacon (1992). Lidia Capo (ed.). Storia dei Longobardi (in Italian). Milan: Lorenzo Valla/Mondadori. ISBN 88-04-33010-4.
- Jarnut, Jörg (1995) [1982]. Storia dei Longobardi (in Italian). Translated by Guglielmotti, Paola. Torino: Einaudi. ISBN 88-06-13658-5.
- Rovagnati, Sergio (2003). I Longobardi (in Italian). Milano: Xenia. ISBN 88-7273-484-3.
