= Duchy of Tuscany =

Duchy of Tuscany may refer to the following central Italian territories:

- Tuscia, historical region in Central Italy
- Duchy of Tuscia (576–797), Lombard duchy
- March of Tuscany (812–1197), frontier march of the Holy Roman Empire
- Duchy of Florence (1532–1569)
- Grand Duchy of Tuscany (1569–1859)
