= Cesina family =

Italian family

House of Cesina Cesina
- Country: Principality of Benevento; Principality of Capua; Principality of Salerno; Kingdom of Sicily; Kingdom of Naples; Kingdom of the Two Sicilies; Kingdom of Italy
- Current region: Italy; European Union
- Origin: Kingdom of the Lombards; Duchy of Benevento
- Founded: 665; 1361 years ago
- Connected families: Frezza

The Cesina family is an Italian family of Roman-Lombard origin.

== Origins ==
The Cesina family takes its surname from the fiefdom, being vassals of the Lombard dukes of Duchy of Benevento.
Initially, the fiefdom was a wooded area designated for woodcutting and later converted into an agricultural field, formed in 664 as a reward to the vassal by the Lombard king Grimoald, King of Italy.

A map of Italy, showing the Principality of Capua, as it appeared in 1000

Political map of Southern Italy in 1112

Political map of Southern Italy in 1154

The fiefdom Cesina was originally included in the gastaldate of Aquino, which controlled the entire territory of Cassino, and it had considerable strategic importance in guarding the borders of the Duchy of Benevento. While later, in the 8th century, it was included in the gastaldate of Teano. The vassals preserved the fief for the dukes and then princes of Benevento, until 883, when the territory was devastated from the arrival of the Saracens, who came from Agropoli at the invitation of Docibilis I, Duke of Gaeta, who destroyed the Abbey of Monte Cassino. The survivors took refuge in Presenzano. After the Battle of Garigliano, in 915, the fiefdom was included to the Principality of Capua.

In 1019, the fiefdom was claimed by Abbot of Monte Cassino Atenulf who requested its restitution from his brother, the Lombard prince Pandulf IV of Capua.
With the end of the Lombard domains in Italy in 1077, conquered by the Normans, under the leadership of the famous Robert Guiscard, and added to their County of Sicily, the fiefdom entered the possession of the Di Sangro family, heirs of the Counts of Marsi.

A map of Italy in 1494

A map of Italy in 1796

A map of Italy in 1843

A map of Italy in 1870

== Notable members ==
- Giuseppe Cesina, Secretary of Kingdom of Sicily from 1678 to 1688, at service Viceroys of Sicily, under King Charles II of Spain.
- Giovanni Giacomo Cesina, born in Bosco, Principato Citra, Kingdom of Naples, Doctor of Law, 1724
- Eugenio Cesina, Assessor of Venice, Kingdom of Lombardy–Venetia in 1848, witness of the interrogation in prison of the Italian patriot Daniele Manin.

== Family tree ==
Cesina Family

Angelo Cesina (n/a)	unknown
Paolo Cesina (n/a)	unknown	Mario Cesina (1904–1996)	unknown	Giuseppe Cesina (1905–1999)	unknown	Erminia Cesina (n/a)	Claudia Cesina (n/a)	Rosa Cesina (n/a)
Aldo Cesina (1929–2019)	unknown
Angelo Cesina (1938–2017)	unknown

== See also ==
- Cesina
- Cesina (surname)
- Kingdom of the Lombards
- Duchy of Benevento
- Terra Sancti Benedicti
- Duchy of Rome
- Via Latina
- Principality of Capua
- Origo Gentis Langobardorum
- Edictum Rothari
- History of the Lombards
- Early Middle Ages
- History of Italy

== Bibliography ==
- Berardo Candida Gonzaga, Count, Memorie delle famiglie nobili delle province meridionali d'Italia, vol. 1 e 6, Bologna, Arnaldo Forni Editore, 1875.
