= Rotarit =

Rotarit (or Rotharit) (died Turin, 702) was a Lombard duke, the last Duke of Bergamo.

In 700, fighting broke out over the succession of the just disappeared king, Cunipert (to which he was faithful), Rotarit stood in favor of his son, Liutpert, who was still underage, and his tutor Ansprand. Opposing him was the Duke of Turin Raginpert, the son of Godepert and therefore an exponent of the ruling Bavarian dynasty. The fighting ended with a battle fought at Novara in early 701, during which Rotarit and his ally Ansprand succumbed. Raginpert, supported by the Lombards of Neustria (the Northwest region of the kingdom) ascended to the throne and immediately associated his son, the future Aripert II.

With the death of Raginpert, which occurred a few months after the battle of Novara, Rotarit and Ansprand imprisoned Aripert II and restored Liutpert to the throne. Aripert II, however, managed to escape and the following year (702) defeated the protectors of Liutpert at Pavia, deposed and imprisoned the young king, and crowned himself in his place. Rotarit, back in Bergamo, proclaimed himself king but was defeated after a bloody siege by Aripert. After forcing Rotarit to shave his beard and his head as a sign of great dishonor, Aripert moved him to Turin where he killed him in 702.

== See also ==
- Duchy of Bergamo
- Lombards
