= Giovanni Battista Benaschi =

Italian painter

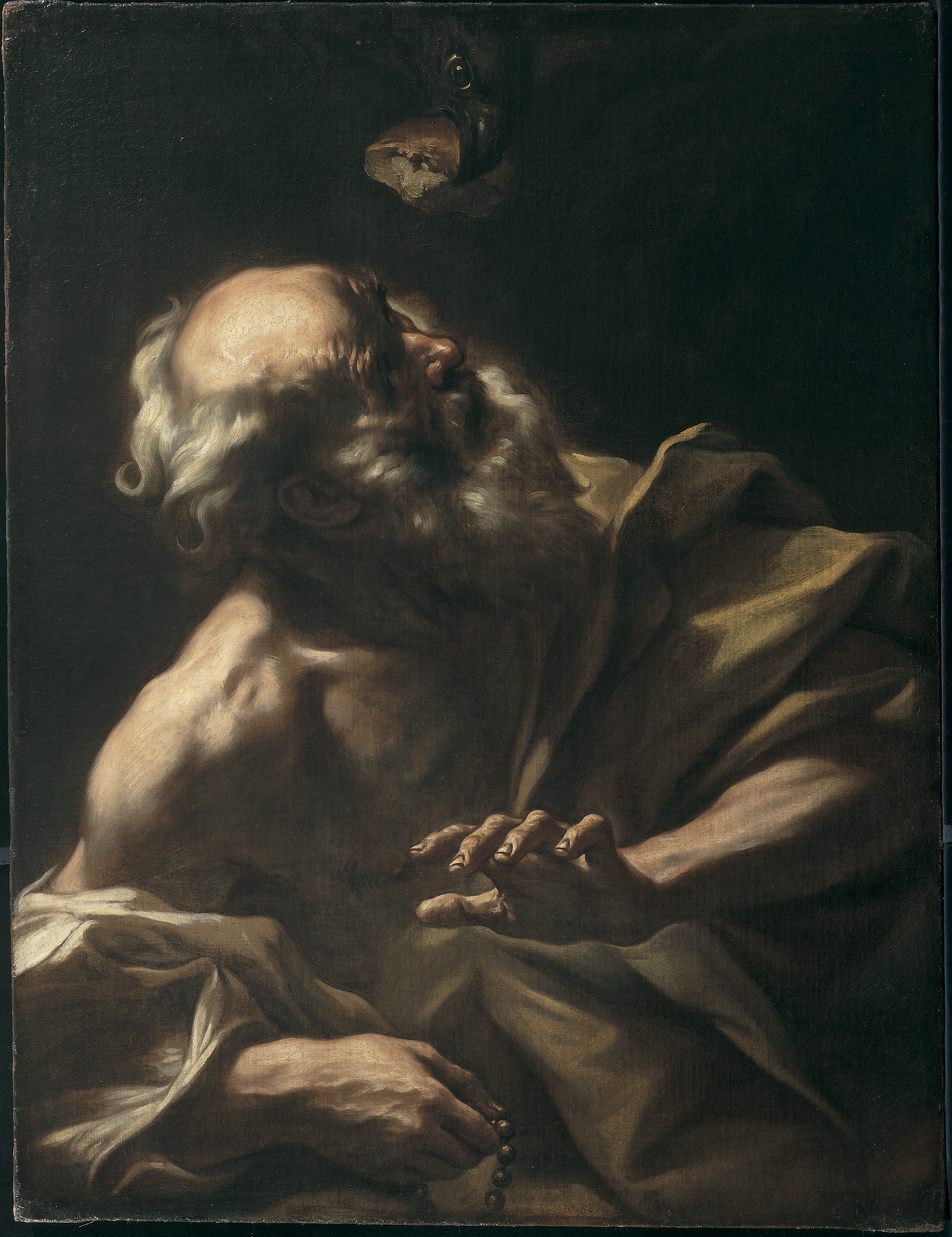
- Saint Paul the Hermit, oil on canvas, Hood Museum of Art, Dartmouth College
- Born: 1636; Turin, Duchy of Savoy
- Died: 28 September 1688 (aged 51–52); Naples, Kingdom of Naples
- Education: Pietro del Pò
- Known for: Painting
- Movement: Mannerism; Baroque

Giovanni Battista Benaschi, or Beinaschi, (1636 – September 28, 1688) was an Italian painter and engraver active in the Mannerist and Baroque style.

== Life ==
He was born in Turin. He first trained in the Piedmont, under a painter by the name of Spirito, then was the main pupil of Pietro del Pò in Rome.

Titi gave some details of his activity in Rome and he mentioned the following works: the Annunciation, the Crucifixion and the St. Michael who Defeats the Rebel Angels in San Bonaventura al Palatino; the frescoed Fortress in a vault of the left aisle of San Carlo al Corso; the two paintings depicting Daniel in the Lions' Den and the Resurrection of Lazarus, the frescoes with Eternal Father in Glory and the Assumption in the choir of Santa Maria del Suffragio (dating to shortly after 1662). Some other work performed for private individuals and today no longer traceable were mentioned in the Lives of Pascoli.

In the paintings mentioned above he showed a marked influence of Lanfranco's painting, although Benaschi could not have studied under the master, since Lanfranco died in 1647. The master's influence persisted and was enriched with new ideas during his stay in Naples, which began around 1664, the year in which he decorated, with a Life of San Nicola, the small, no longer extant, church of St. Nicola alla Dogana.

As did many other aspiring artists, Benaschi drew inspiration from the Carracci frescoes from the Farnese Gallery, from the statues in the Belvedere at the Vatican Palace, paintings from San Carlo de' Catinari and the works of Lanfranco from the church of Sant Andrea della Valle. Among his patrons were Giovanni Battista Cesalassi and the Jurist Alberetti. In Naples, he painted several ceilings and frescoes, for example at the Chiesa di Santa Maria in Portico, and the cupula of Santi Apostoli. He completed an etching of a Holy Family, after Giovanni Domenico Cerrini, who was his intimate friend.

Relative to Lanfranco's style, Benaschi lightened the tints and attenuated the graphic prominence of the contours of the figures in order to achieve greater chromatic fusion and a more rough pictorialism. This style manifested in the frescoes of the chapel of Santa Maria La Nova (Death of Saint Anne, St Paul Preaching, St Louis of Toulouse Shows the Bull of Indulgences to the People), in the paintings of the chapel of St Michael in the church of the Santi Apostoli, then in the fresco executed in the dome of this same church (1680, with the collaboration of Orazio Frezza), and then in the Saints on the front arches of the chapel of the church of the Gerolamini (1681).

Being ill he retired to live in the convent of Santa Maria delle Grazie in Caponapoli where he decorated the church with a vast cycle of frescoes executed with the help of Orazio Frezza and Giuseppe Castellano and depicting episodes from the Life of Christ and Virgin. During a hospitalization in that monastery, he died on the 28th of September 1688.

He had a daughter, Angela, born in Turin in 1666 and died in Rome in 1746, also a painter who was appreciated by her contemporaries - and especially by Pascoli - as a portraitist: at the moment, however, no work of hers is known. Among his pupils was Orazio Frezza.

== Gallery ==
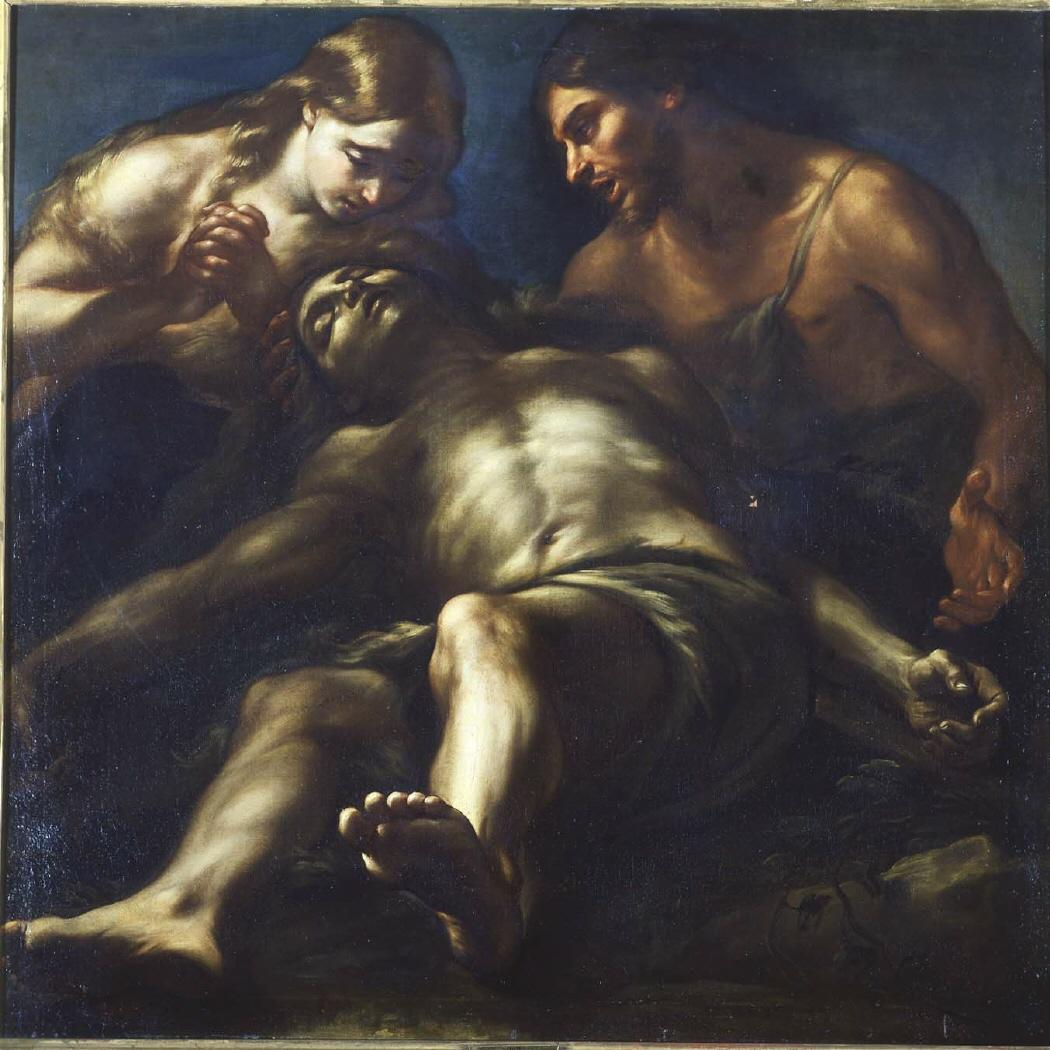
The Deploration of Abel, Real Academia de Bellas Artes de San Fernando, Madrid

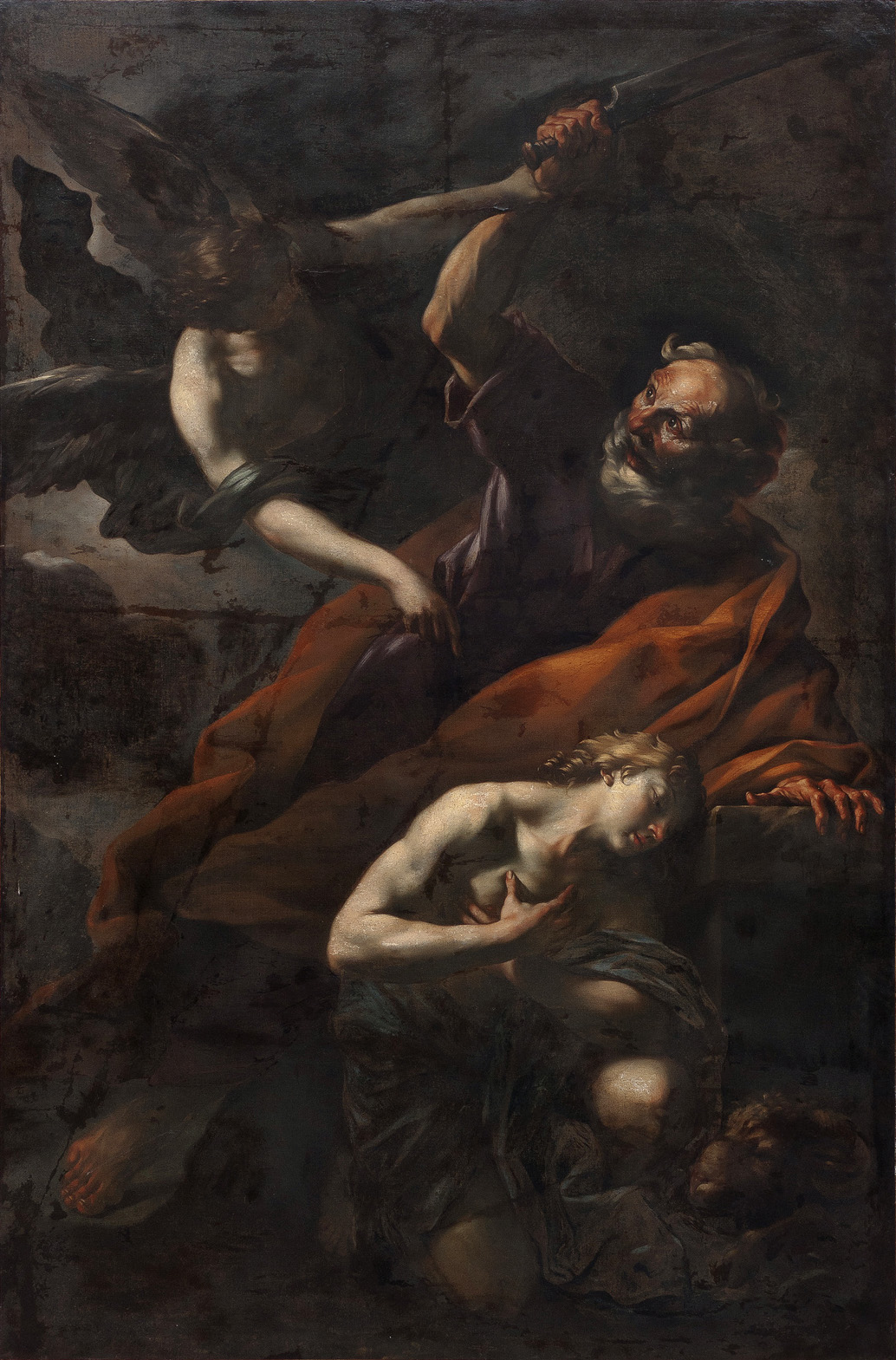
The Sacrifice of Isaac, Musée des Beaux-Arts de Brest

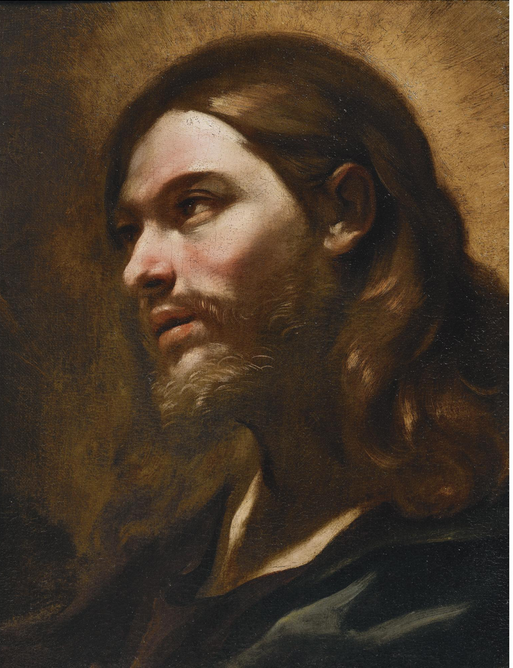
Head of Christ, priv. col.

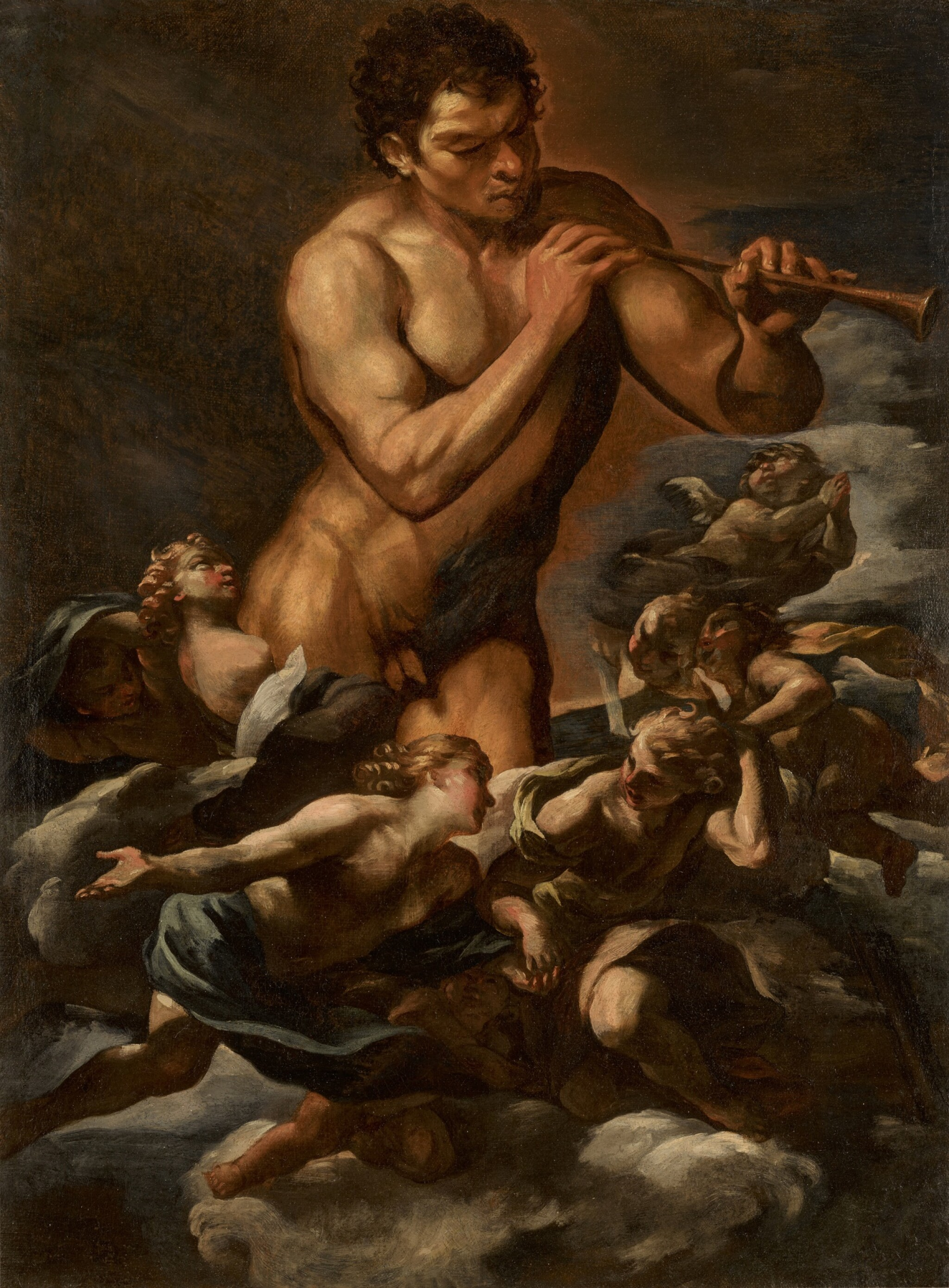
Mythological scene, oil on canvas, priv. col.

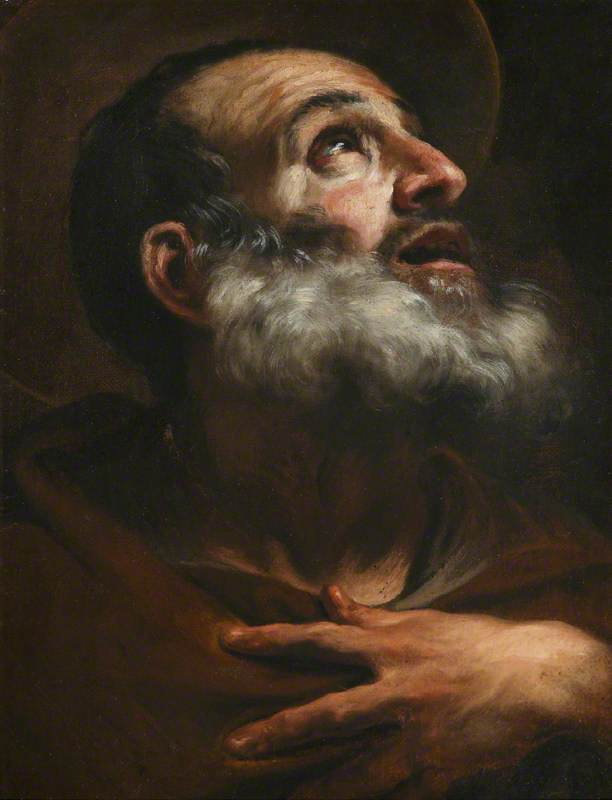
Head of an Apostle, National Trust

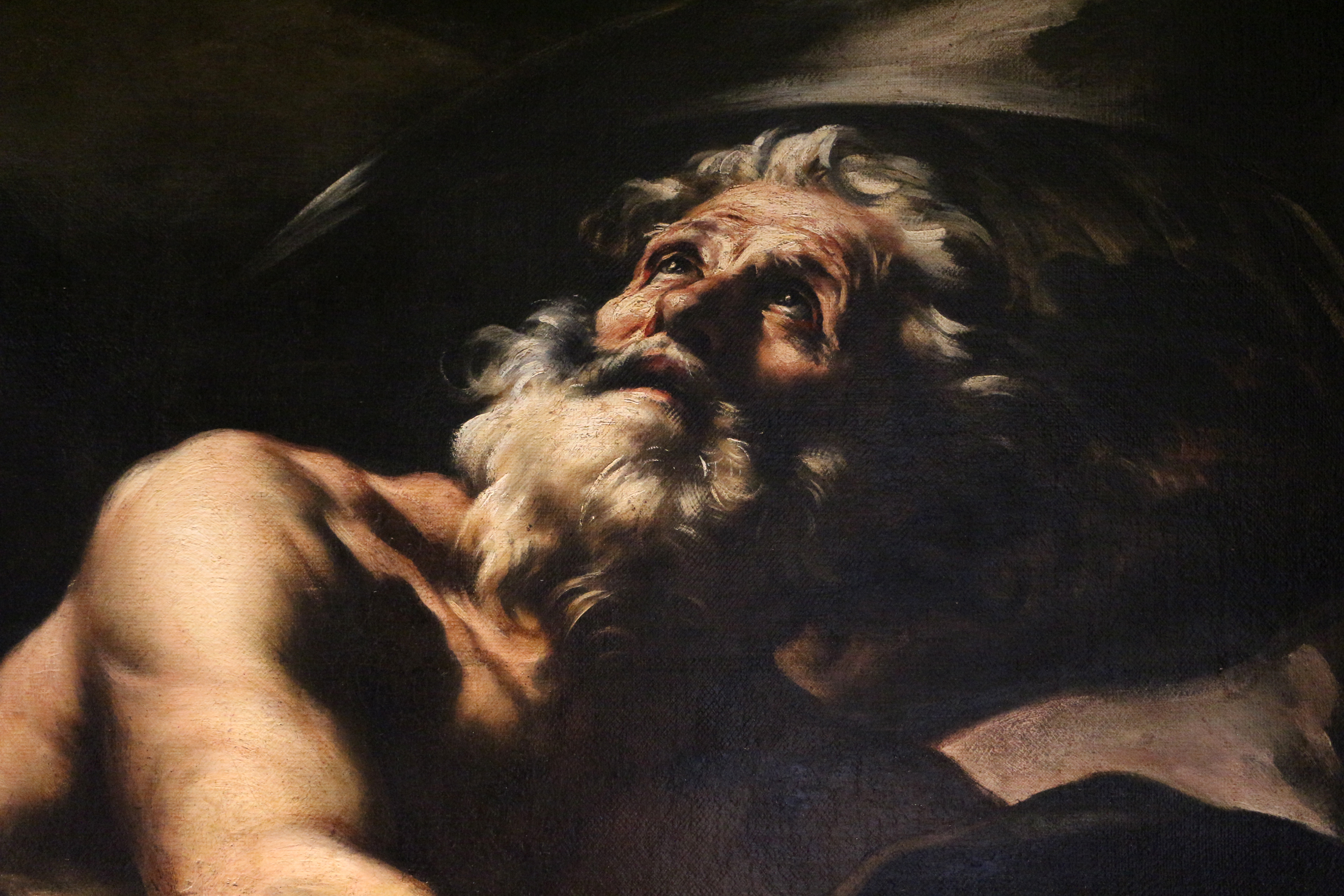
Allegory of Time (Detail), Palazzo Buonaccorsi, Macerata
