= Frezza =

Frezza is an Italian surname. Notable people with the surname include:

- Alberto Frezza (born 1989), Italian–American actor
- Fortunato Frezza (born 1942), Italian Roman Catholic priest
- Giammarco Frezza (born 1975), Italian footballer
- Giovanni Frezza (born 1972), Italian actor
- Giovanni Girolamo Frezza (1659–1730), Italian engraver
- Orazio Frezza (fl. 17th c.), Italian Baroque painter
