= San Bonaventura al Palatino =

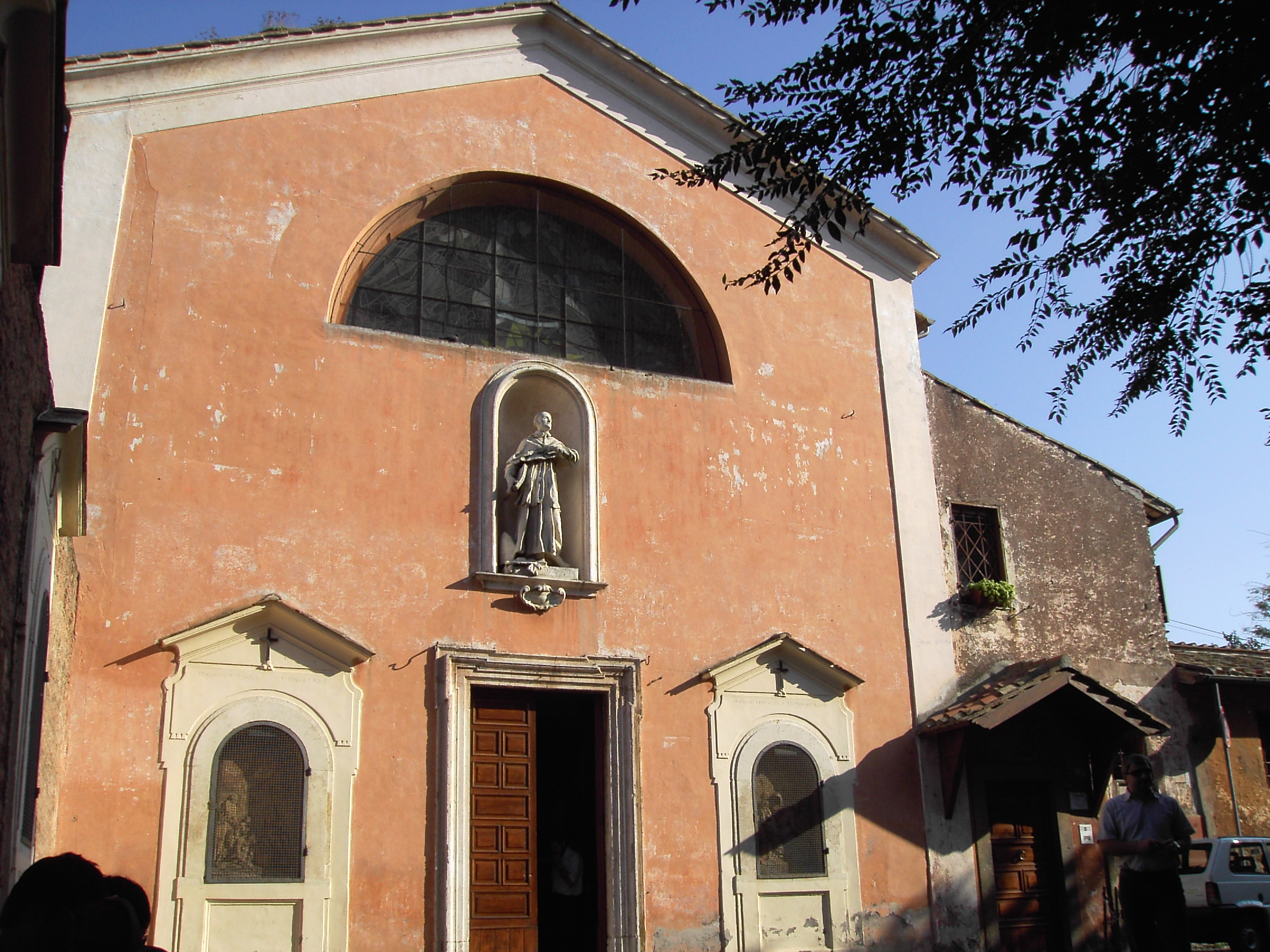
- Facade
- Click on the map for a fullscreen view
- 41°53′20″N 12°29′18″E
- Location: Via Marco Colidio, Rome
- Country: Italy
- Denomination: Roman Catholic

Architecture
- Completed: 1689

The Church of San Bonaventura al Palatino is a small 17th century church building in Rome built on Via Marco Colidio on the Palatine Hill. It is a Franciscan monastery church built by Francesco Barberini on the request of the Blessed Bonaventura Gran and was completed in 1689.

== History ==
The friary was founded in 1625. The church is dedicated to Saint Bonaventure. At the request of Blessed Bonaventure Gran, the construction was donated by Cardinal Barberini. The land on which the church stands was owned by the Barberini family and had been used for wine growing until then. It was built over an ancient tank of the aqueduct of emperor Claudius (41-54). Construction work began in 1675 and was completed in 1689, but Bonaventura did not live to see it, having died five years earlier. A small convent was annexed and given to the Spanish Discalced Franciscans. It was known as “alla Polveriera” for in the vicinity in the sixteenth century was a gunpowder factory.

Archaeological excavations on the Palatine carried out in the mid-nineteenth century partially demolished the convent, so in the years 1839-40 the opportunity was taken to restore the entire complex, from the convent itself to the facade and inside the church, thanks to funding from Carlo and Alessandro Torlonia.

== Architecture ==
The present façade dates only from the beginning of the 19th century. Only three niches and a semicircular window give some structure. The two lower niches next to the portal contain the last two stations of a Stations of the Cross leading to the monastery and the church. Above the portal, the niche contains a Baroque statue of Saint Bonaventure. The semicircular window above it, like the entire upper façade above the statue, was only created when the church was vaulted in 1839. The stained glass window inside is a modern work.

== Interior ==
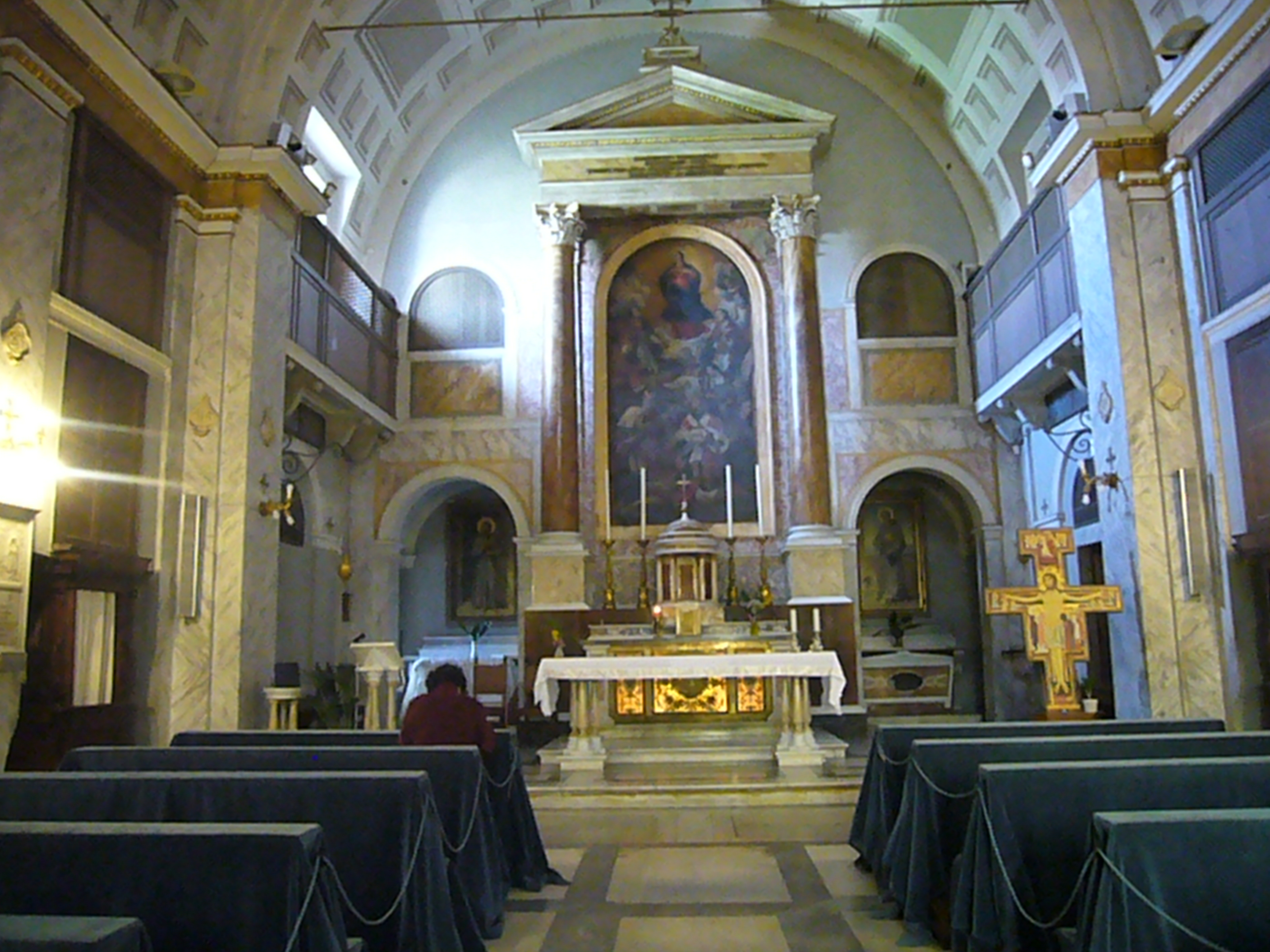
interior

The church is a single-nave building, and on the sides of the main altar are two small chapels in slight wall recesses, with smaller altars along the walls. The building is covered by a barrel vault built in 1839; previously the church had only a flat ceiling. The coffered vaulting is merely painted. The structural pilasters of the walls and the triumphal arch to the choir follow the Tuscan order. On either side of the high altar are entrances to small side chapels, above which are oratories.

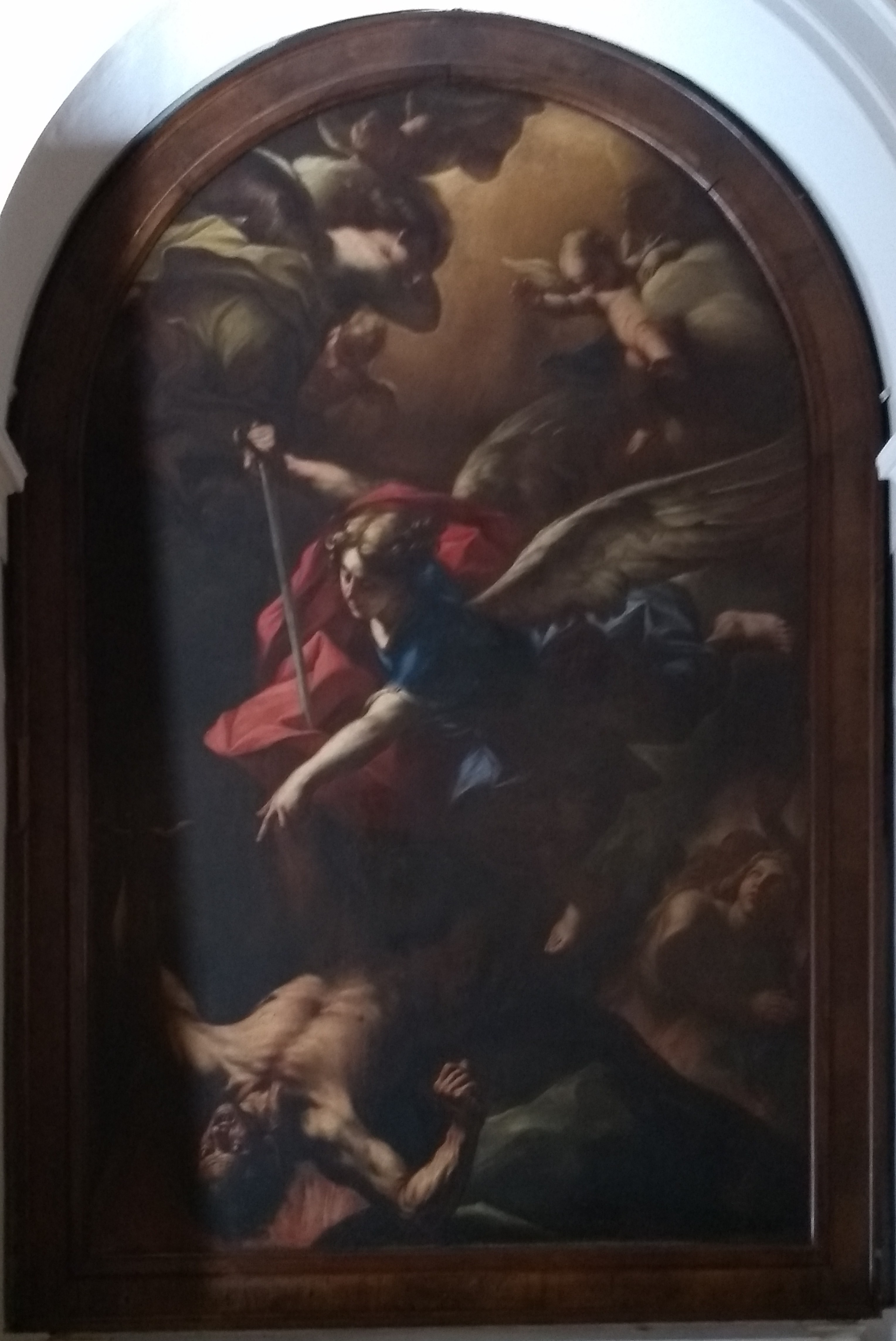
Archangel Michael

Above the high altar is a painting of the Immaculata with other saints. The painting is the work of Filippo Micheli da Camerino. It is framed by an aedicule, the columns follow the composite order. The high altar contains the relics of St. Leonardo da Porto Maurizio. A crucifix which he used on his missions is preserved here, to the left of the sanctuary. St. Leonard's cell has been turned into a museum.

The left side altar contains the relics of St Flavianus, a martyr. The altarpiece shows St. Francis of Assisi. The right side altar contains relics of St. Colomba, and the altarpiece depicts St. Anthony of Padua.

Above the front altar on the right side wall is a crucifixion scene by Giovanni Battista Benaschi from the 17th century, above the rear altar on the right is the depiction of Saints Paschalis, Diego and Salvatore d'Orta, a work by Giacinto Calandrucci. On the centre wall are the relics of Blessed John Baptist of Burgundy.

On the left side wall at the front is an altar with a representation of the Archangel Michael, also by Benaschi. The rear altar on the left contains an altarpiece showing the Annunciation of the Lord, again by Benaschi.

Painter Francesco Mancini (1679–1758) is buried in the church; as is Cardinal Silvio Valenti Gonzaga (†1756).
