= Bonaventura Gran =

Blessed Blessed Bonaventura Gran OFM
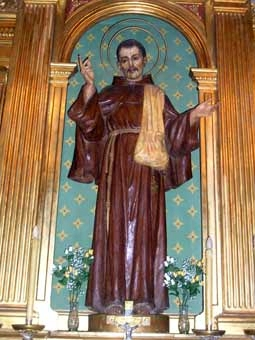
- Born: 24 November 1620; Riudoms
- Died: 11 September 1684 (aged 63); Rome
- Venerated in: Riudoms
- Beatified: 1906, Rome by Saint Pius X

Miguel Baptista Gran Peris, OFM (24 November 1620 - 11 September 1684), known as Blessed Bonaventura Gran or Fra Bonaventura of Barcelona, was a Catalonian Franciscan friar. He was beatified by Pope Pius X in 1906.

== Biography ==
He was born in Riudoms, Catalonia, on 24 November 1620 in a modest house in the street known as a Pocket Street (Carrer de la Butxaca in Catalan) and now has his name. After marrying at the age of 18 as his father wished, he was widowed in a few months. He entered the Franciscan convent of Sant Miquel d'Escornalbou and made religious profession on 14 July 1641, changing his name to Bonaventura. In the following years, he was sent to Mora d'Ebre, Figueres, la Bisbal d'Empordà and Terrassa, where another street has been named for him.

In 1658 he was sent to Rome where he founded Santo Retiro are four monasteries in the province of Rome, including San Bonaventura al Palatino. He was an adviser to four popes: Alexander VII, Clement IX, Clement X and Innocent XI. In Rome in 1662 he founded the Riformella, a reform movement within the Reformed Order of Friars Minor of the Strict Observance, so the monks and Franciscan priests who dedicated themselves to the apostolate could gather in meditation and spiritual retreat, living the founding spirit of the Franciscan order.

In 1679, he sent from Rome the relics of Saint Boniface, Saint Julian and Saint Vincent. Since then, the second Sunday of May is celebrated in Riudoms as the Feast of the Holy Relics.

He died in Rome on 11 September 1684.

== Veneration ==
Bonatura was declared venerable in 1775. On 14 June 1906 he was beatified by Pope Pius X, after the verification of two miraculous healings. The first one in 1790 when a woman was in a serious condition after falling from the horse and was inexplicably cured after have invoked him. The other, in 1818 in which another woman remained unconscious for three days after childbirth and cured instantaneously after applying him a relic of Bonaventura. The cause for his sainthood was opened on 9 December 1909.

In Riudoms, his remains have been preserved since 1972, when they were moved from Rome. They are currently in the tabernacle chapel in the church of Saint James the Apostle. In Riudoms there is a great devotion to Blessed Bonaventura and a feast in his honour is celebrated every 24 November, where his remains are taken in procession through the village.

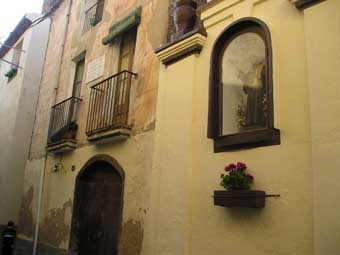
Birth house of Bonaventura Gran. Annexed there is a little chapel with his image.

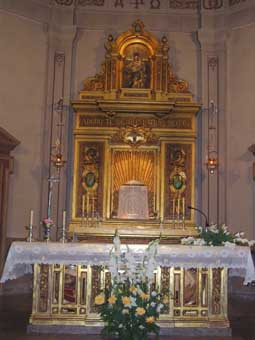
Tabernacle chappel in the church of Riudoms, where his remains are preserved

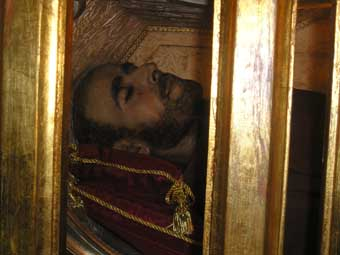
Image of the urn where his remains are preserved
