= Langobardia Major =

Name used for an area of modern Italy in the middle ages

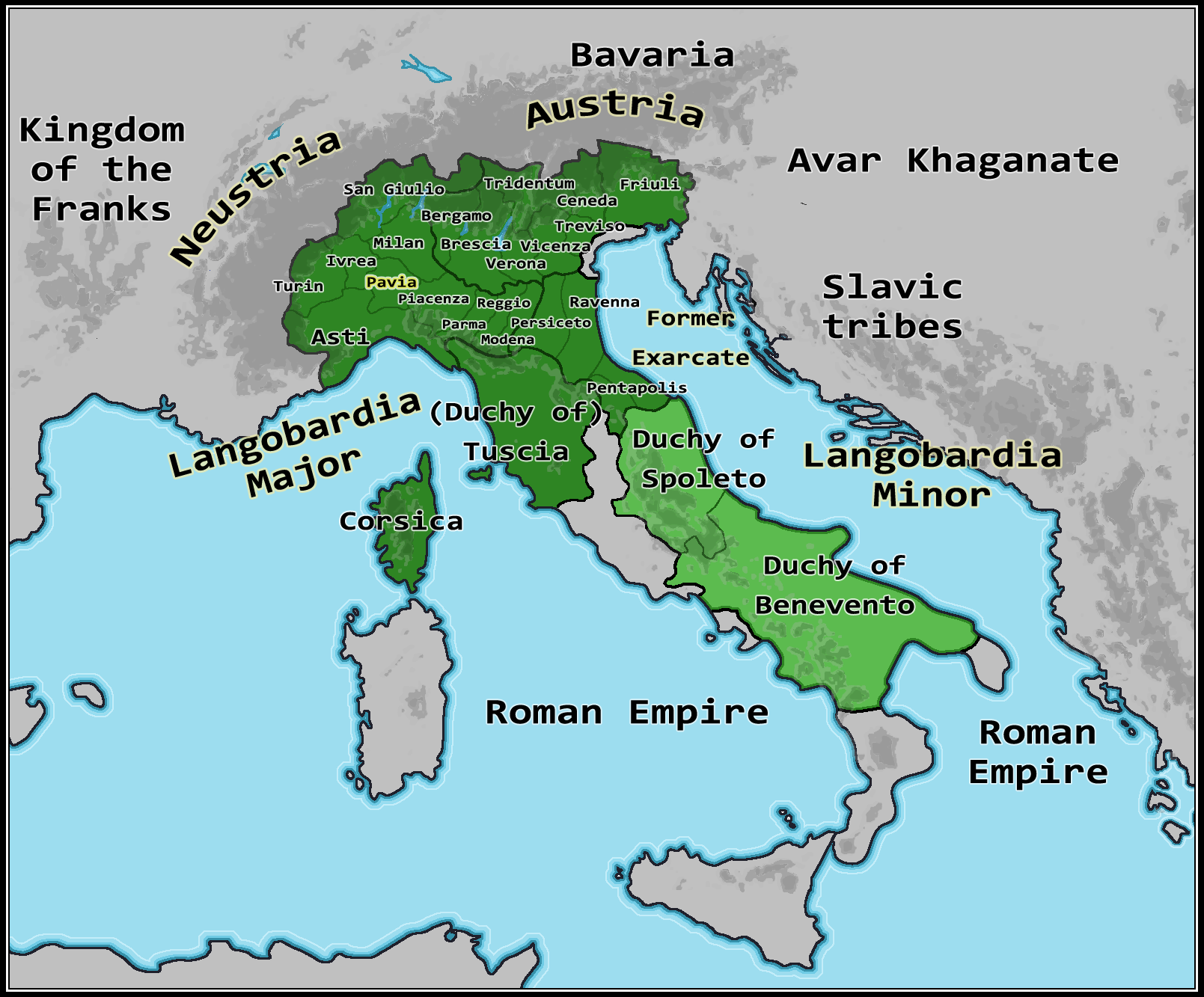
Langobardia Maior in dark green in the Lombard domains (740)

Langobardia Major was the name that, in the Early Middle Ages, was given to the domains of the Lombard Kingdom in Northern Italy. It comprised Lombardy proper with its capital Pavia, the Duchies of Friuli and Trent as well as the Tuscany region. In the south, it was bordered by the Patrimonium Sancti Petri, which would become the Papal States following the 754 Donation of Pepin, stretching from the Tyrrhenian to the Adriatic Sea. The Lombard territories further to the south were called Langobardia Minor, consisting of the Duchies of Spoleto and Benevento.

Langobardia Major was internally divided into eastern Austria, western Neustria and Tuscia. After the domains had been conquered by Charlemagne at the 774 Siege of Pavia, they became part of the Carolingian Empire.
