= Neustria (Italy) =

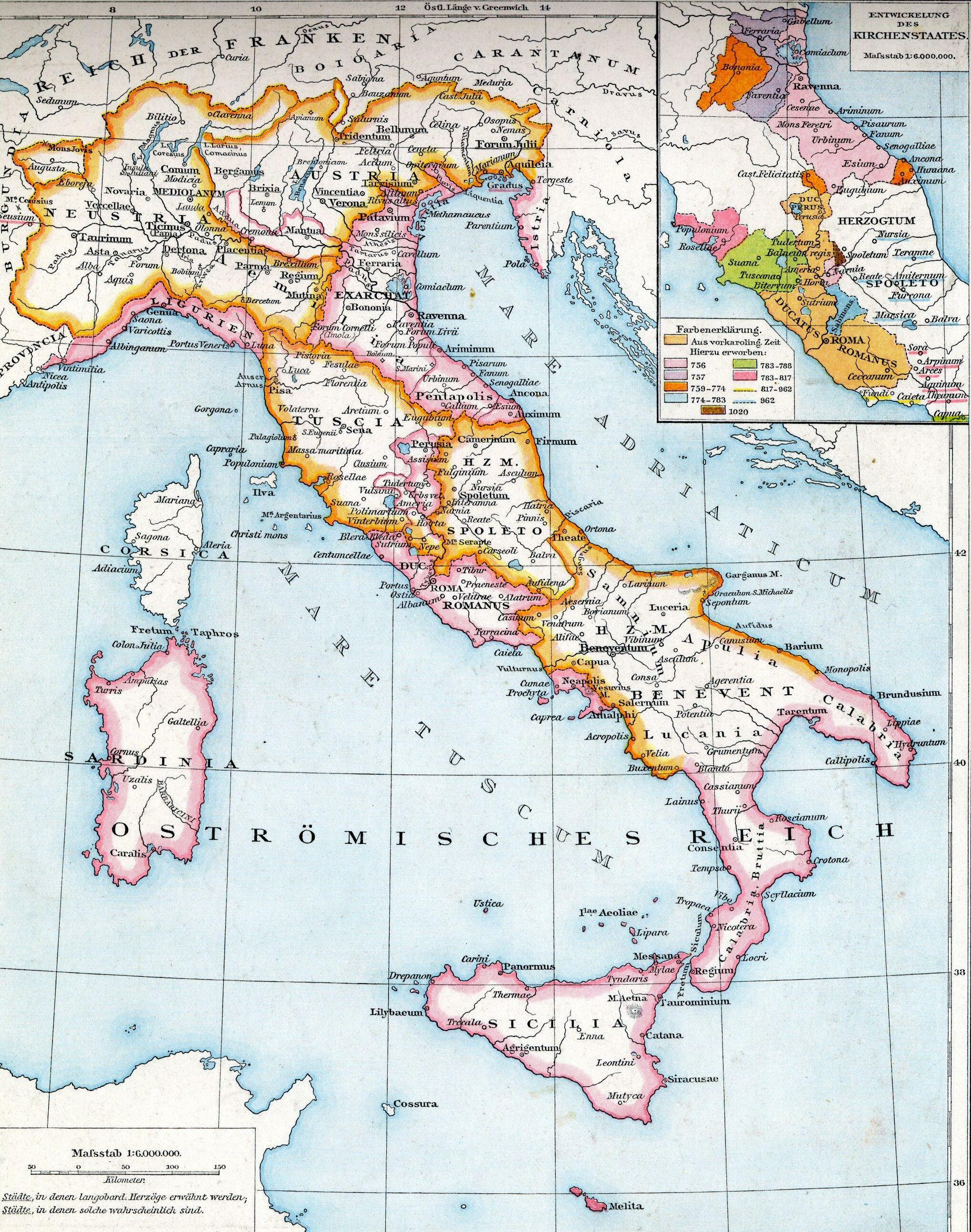
Lombard possessions in Italy: the Lombard Kingdom (Neustria, Austria and Tuscia) and the Lombard Duchies of Spoleto and Benevento

Neustria was, according to the early medieval geographical classification, the western portion of Langobardia Major, the north-central part of the Lombard Kingdom, extended from the Adda (river) to the Western Alps and opposite to Austria. The partition had not only been territorial, but also implied significant cultural and political differences.

== Territory ==
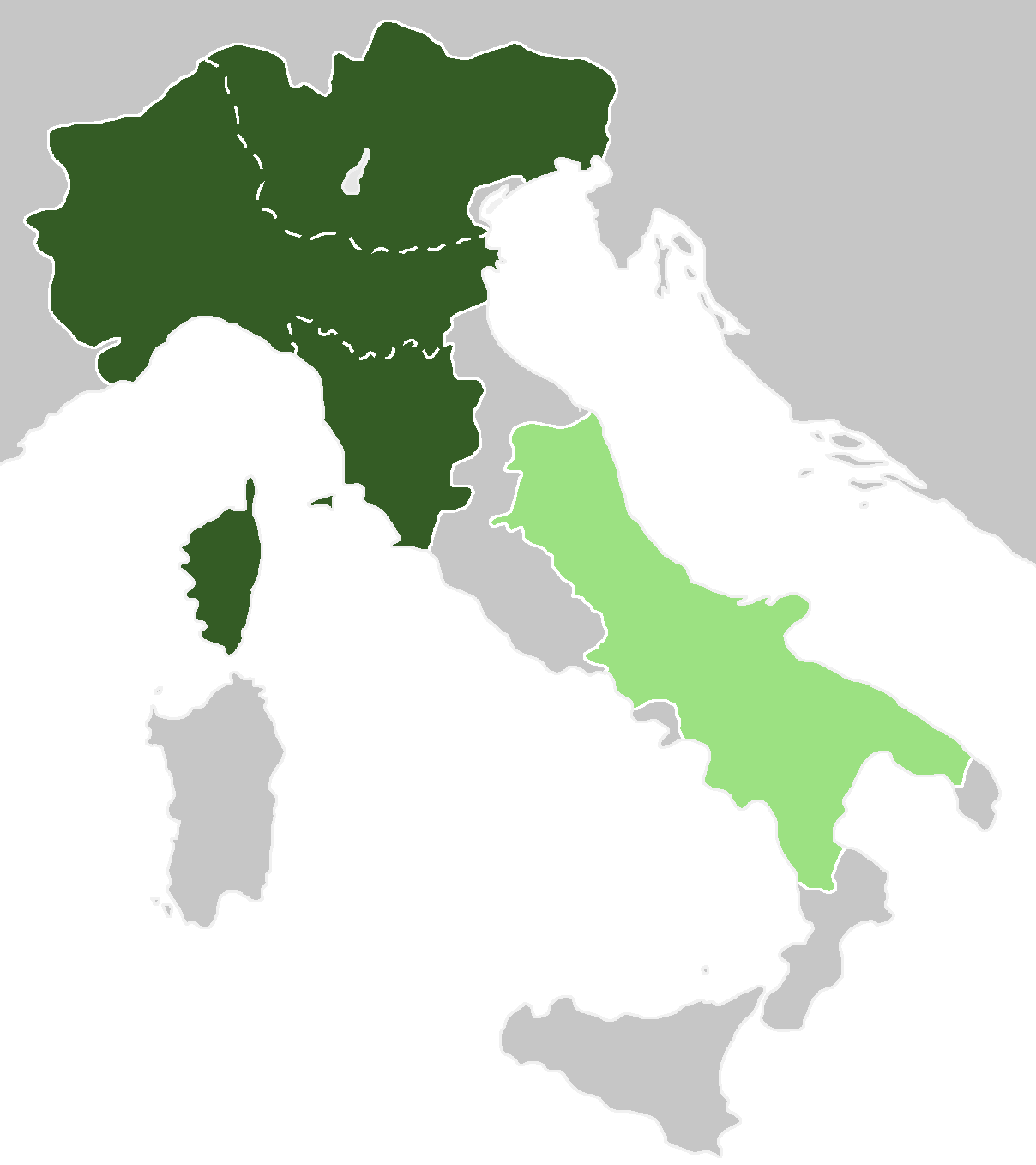
Neustria was the western of the 3 northern Lombard areas.

Neustria included the duchies of the north-western Lombard Kingdom. Among them a prominent role was played by:

- Duchy of Pavia (home of the Lombard royal court)
- Duchy of Asti
- Duchy of Turin

== History ==
The duchies of Neustria were long the most loyal to the Bavarian dynasty, accepting both the pro-Catholic inspiration and the consequent policy of appeasement of Italy, without further attempts to expand against the Byzantines and the pope. In the 8th century, however, the widespread conversion of the Lombards to Catholicism smoothed the opposition between Austria and Neustria, thanks to a revived expansion at the expense of the Byzantine Empire with the Catholic and Neustrian Liutprand (king from 712).

After the fall of the Lombard kingdom in 774, the Langobardia Maior fell entirely under the dominion of the Franks. Its political-administrative structure was not disrupted, however, instead of the dukes, Frank but also Lombard counts were settled.

== Bibliography ==
=== Primary sources ===
- Origo gentis Langobardorum, ed. Georg Waitz in Monumenta Germaniae Historica SS rer. Lang.
- Paul Deacon, Historia Langobardorum (Storia dei Longobardi, cura e commento di Lidia Capo, Lorenzo Valla/Mondadori, Milan 1992).

=== Historiographic literature ===
- Lidia Capo. Comment to Deacon, Paul (1992). Storia dei Longobardi (in Italian). curator: Lidia Capo. Milan: Lorenzo Valla/Mondadori. ISBN 88-04-33010-4.
- Jarnut, Jörg (1995) [1982]. Storia dei Longobardi (in Italian). Translated by Guglielmotti, Paola. Torino: Einaudi. ISBN 88-06-13658-5.
- Rovagnati, Sergio (2003). I Longobardi (in Italian). Milano: Xenia. ISBN 88-7273-484-3.

== See also ==
- Langobardia Major
- Langobardia Minor
- Austria (Lombard)
- Lombard Kingdom
