= Orazio Frezza =

Italian painter

Orazio Frezza was an Italian painter of the Baroque period, born and active in Naples,

He was instructed by Giovanni Battista Benaschi. He afterwards studied the works of Giovanni Lanfranco and Domenichino, whom he imitated with some success. He painted for a church in Naples, a Calvary now exhibited in Castel Capuano.
