= Cesini (surname) =

Cesini is an Italian surname.

Notable people with the surname include:

- Davide Cesini (born 1988), Italian water polo player
- Gianni Cesini (born 1948), Italian physicist
- Luciano Cesini (born 1948), Italian football coach and player
- Riccardo Cesini, Italian water polo player, brother of Davide Cesini
