= Cesi (surname) =

Cesi is an Italian surname.

It may refer to the House of Cesi, a noble family of Umbrian origin.

To this belong:

- Federico Cesi (1500–65), Italian Cardinal
- Federico Cesi (1585–1630), Italian scientist
- Paolo Emilio Cesi (1481–1537), Italian Cardinal
- Pier Donato Cesi (1521–1586), Italian Cardinal
- Pier Donato Cesi (1583–1656), Italian Cardinal

Further notable people with the surname include:

- Bartolomeo Cesi (1556–1629) Italian baroque era painter
- Bartolomeo Cesi (bishop) (–1537), Italian Roman Catholic bishop
- Bartolomeo Cesi (cardinal) (1566–1621), Italian Roman Catholic cardinal
- Beniamino Cesi (1845–1907), Italian concert pianist
- Carlo Cesi (1622–82), Italian painter and engraver
