= Duchy of Tuscia =

Lombard duchy in Medieval central Italy, 576–797

Duchy of Tuscia Ducatus Tusciae (Latin)
- 576–797
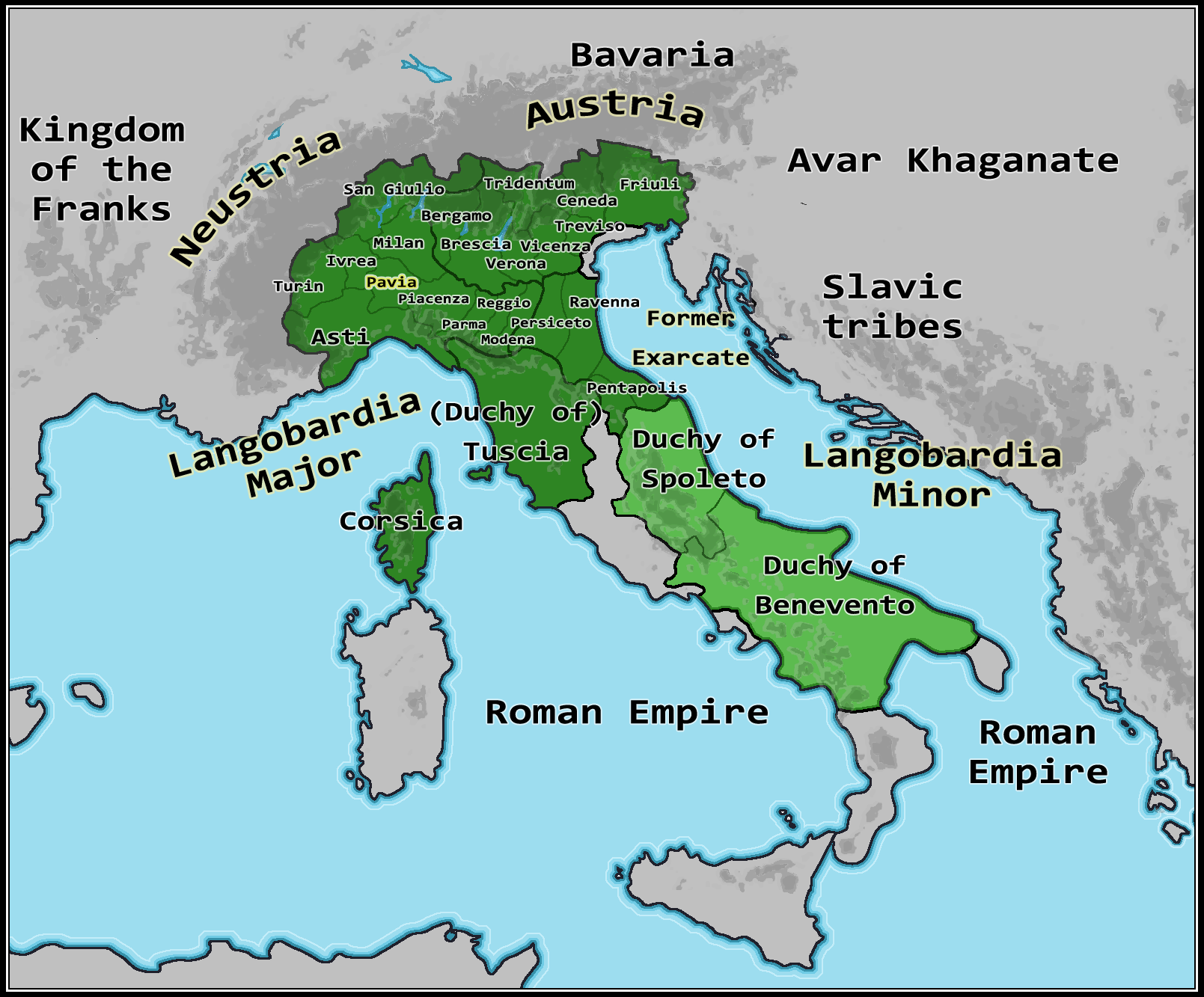
- The Duchy of Tuscia in Central Italy within the Kingdom of the Lombards
- Status: Duchy of the Lombards; (576-774); Duchy of Francia; (774-797)
- Capital: Lucca
- Common languages: Lombard; Latin
- Religion: Chalcedonian Christianity
- Duke of Tuscia
  - 576–585: Gummarito
  - 774–797: Allone
- Historical era: Early Middle Ages
  - Established: 576
  - Frankish conquest of the Lombard Kingdom: 774
  - Disestablished: 797
Preceded by	Succeeded by
Byzantine Empire under the Justinian dynasty	Frankish Italy
- Today part of: Tuscany

The Duchy of Tuscia (/ˈtʌsiə, ˈtʌʃ(i)ə/ TUSS-ee-ə, TUSH-(ee-)ə; Modern Italian: Ducato di Tuscia [duˈkaːto di ˈtuʃʃa]; Latin: Ducatus Tusciae), initially known as the Duchy of Lucca (Modern Italian: Ducato di Lucca; Latin: Ducatus Lucaniae), was a Lombard duchy in Central Italy, which included much of today's Tuscany. After the occupation of the territories belonging to the Byzantines, the Lombards founded this flourishing duchy which, among other centres, also included Florence. The capital of the duchy was Lucca, which was located along the Via Francigena, being also the city where the dukes resided.

== Territory ==
At the time of its establishment it bordered to the west with the Tyrrhenian Sea and for the rest with the Byzantine territories of the Exarchate of Ravenna. Initially the province of Viterbo (northern Lazio) was also part of the Duchy, and was known in that period as "Roman Tuscia", being a border zone between the Lombard Tuscia and the Byzantine Duchy of Rome. The Pisan region would fall into Lombard hands only half a century later.

== History ==
According to the most recent historiography, Lucca and Spoleto were the first Lombard duchies formed after the death of King Alboin, during the period of ducal anarchy (about 574), in the central part of Tuscia. The duchies were made up of Lombard armies that escaped royal control. The then named "Duchy of Lucca" came to preside over the final route of the Via Aurelia.

From the outset the duchy had to deal with the flooding of the Auserculus (the river Serchio) which surrounded Lucca. Tradition attributes the land reclamation to Fridianus, bishop of Lucca, who had the Serchio flow directly into the sea with the opening of a new mouth.

At the end of the 6th century the Longobard penetration of Tuscia resumed incessantly, with the conquest of various castra, Byzantine fortifications prepared to contain the Longobard occupation.

In 593 King Agilulf, entering the passes of the central Apennines, with his own army reached the border of the Duchy of Rome, occupying Balneus Regis (Bagnoregio) and Urbs Vetus (Orvieto). In 644 King Rothari conquered Luni, the extreme northern castrum of Tuscia. Rotari's last enterprise marked the end of Lombard expansion in Tuscia Langobardorum, bordering on the south with the territories owned by the Byzantines, but dominated by the growing Papal authority.

The borders between the Duchy and the Byzantine Exarchate, negotiated in the peace treaty of 680 between King Perctarit and the Eastern Emperor Constantine IV, remained definitively stable. There arose monastic foundations from the abbey of Bobbio which resumed trade with the plain, creating the basis for the development of agriculture, with the spread of vineyards, chestnut groves, olive groves, mills and oil mills. New commercial routes were opened with the Po Valley through the future and various commercial and communication routes: oil, salt, timber, meat, etc.

In the last period of the Longobard occupation, Lucca managed to excel over almost all the neighboring Judiciaries. For a long time, the capital of Tuscia, it was the habitual seat of the Lombard kings, a privileged city for its past history, for road communications made even more convenient by the opening of the Via Francigena. After the conversion of the Longobards to Catholicism, the territory of the diocese and its ecclesiastical patrimony increased considerably: the southern territory of the city of Luni, between Massa and Montignoso, was included in the Archdiocese of Lucca.

In 713 the Longobards, with the bishop Balsari, built the church of San Miniato. Even the economic conditions of the duchy progressed notably both in agriculture and in commerce, especially in the maritime and river trade. The Negotiantes, naval entrepreneurs, carried out the transport of grain and salt on behalf of Duke Walperto.

In the last period of Lombard domination, King Aistulf, in view of an imminent clash with the Franks, sent Desiderius to Tuscia Langobardorum with the task of carrying out a vast military recruitment.

== The duchy after the end of the Lombard Kingdom ==
In 774, following the conquest of the Lombard kingdom, Charlemagne assumed the title of "Gratia Dei rex Francorum et Langobardorum atque patricius Romanorum" ("By the grace of God, king of the Franks and of the Lombards and Roman patrician"), realizing a personal union of the two kingdoms. Charlemagne chose to maintain the "Leges Langobardorum" even if following the revolt of 776, led by the duke of Friuli Hrodgaud, he replaced the Lombard dukes with counts, public officials, and redistributed the latter's assets among the Frankish aristocrats.

Therefore, also the Duchy of Tuscia was reorganized on a comital basis and in 781 it was placed together with the other ex-Lombard territories in the Regnum Italicorum, entrusted to Pepin under the tutelage of his father, Charlemagne. Later the governors of the region received the title of margraves.

== See also ==
- March of Tuscany

== Sources ==
- Paul the Deacon. Historia Langobardorum. Translated by William Dudley Foulke. University of Pennsylvania: 1907.
- Liber pontificalis, in Duchesne, Louis (1886–1892). Le Liber pontificalis. Texte, introduction et commentaire.
