= Langobardia Minor =

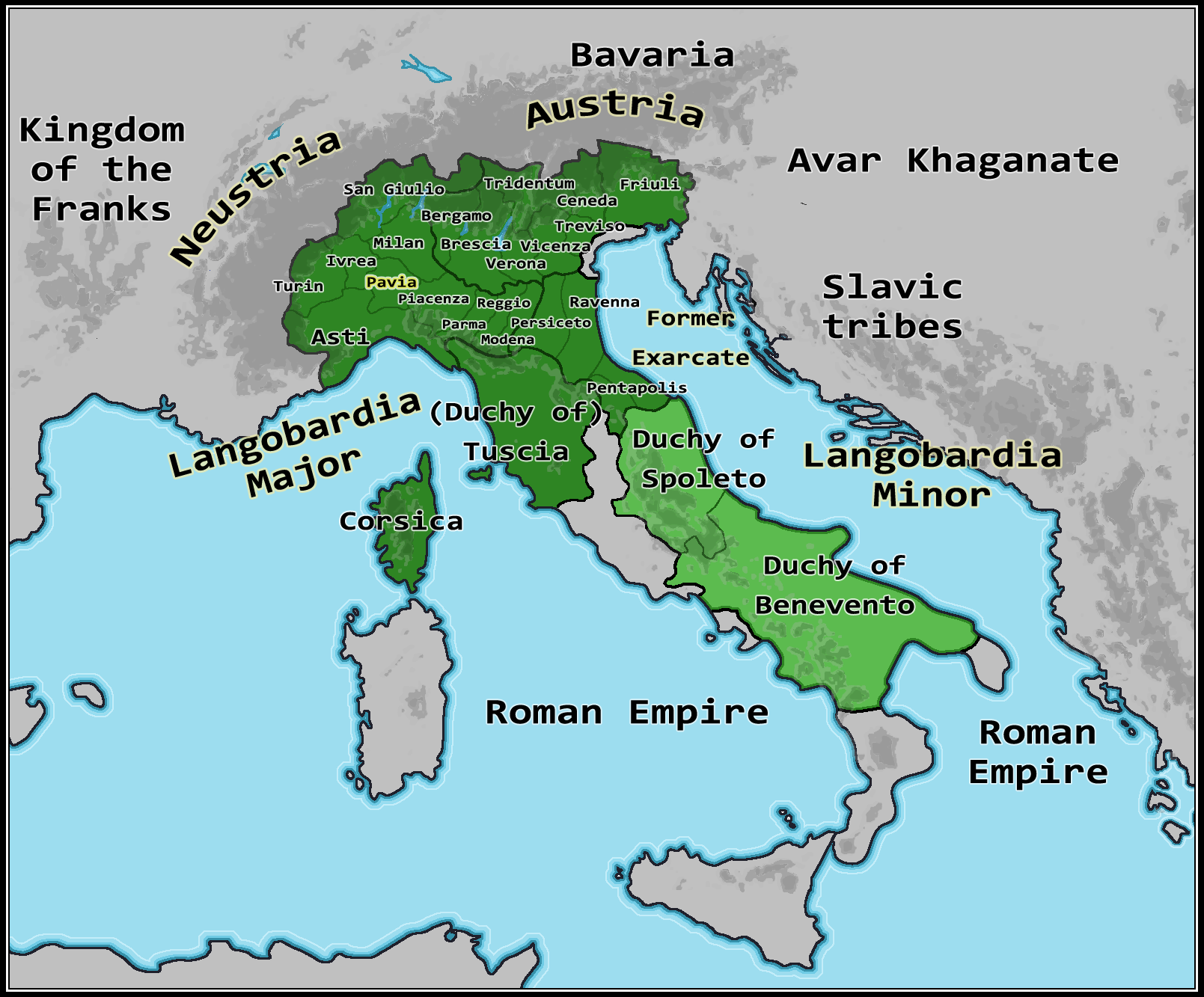
Lombard domains in 740: Langobardia Minor (in light green) and Langobardia Major (in dark green)

Langobardia Minor, also spelled as Longobardia Minor, was a historical name given to the Lombard domains in southern Italy during the Early Middle Ages, in order to distinguish those regions from the Langobardia Major in northern Italy. The scope of Langobardia Minor was corresponding to territories of southern Lombard duchies of Spoleto, Benevento, Salerno and their local dependencies. While the rule of Lombard kings over northern Langobardia Major was direct and effective, their control over southern Langobardia Minor and its dukes was mainly nominal. After the conquest of northern parts of the Lombard kingdom by Charlemagne in 774, its southern duchies in Langobardia Minor remained under control of local Lombard dukes, who preserved their autonomy, but occasionally sided or allied with the Carolingian or the Byzantine empires. After capturing some parts of Langobardia Minor, the Byzantines created a province (theme) called Langobardia. In the 11th century, during the Norman conquest of southern Italy, entire Langobardia Minor gradually came under the Norman rule, and the last Lombard Principality of Salerno fell in 1077, thus ending the Langobardia Minor.

== History ==
After reaching Italy via Friuli in 568, the Lombards conquered a large portion of territory south of the Alps from the Byzantines. These lands, which did not constitute, at least initially, a uniform and contiguous domain, were grouped into two main areas: Langobardia Major, from the Alps to today's Tuscany, and Langobardia Minor, which included the domains south of the Byzantine territories (which, in the late 6th century, stretched from Rome to Ravenna through modern-day Umbria and Marche). The Exarchate of Ravenna was connected to Rome through a Byzantine corridor that went through Orvieto, Chiusi and Perugia and separated Langobardia Minor from Langobardia Major.

While Langobardia Major fragmented into many duchies and city-states, Langobardia Minor maintained, for the duration of the Lombard kingdom (568–774), a remarkable institutional stability, remaining divided into the two duchies of Spoleto and Benevento. They were formed immediately after Lombard penetration, in the 570s, and the first dukes were Faroald in Spoleto and Zotto in Benevento. In the beginning, the two duchies only included the inland areas, leaving control of the coastal areas to the Byzantines; only later (particularly during the reign of Agilulf, 591–616) were Lombard possessions extended to the coasts as well. Consequently, the entire Adriatic coast between the Byzantine strongholds of Ancona in the north and Otranto in the south became subjected to the two duchies. The Ionian and Tyrrhenian Seas, however, only partially fell under the authority of the duke of Benevento, who was never able to permanently occupy the city of Naples, the tip of Salento, the part of Calabria south of Cosenza and Crotone, or the city of Rome and its suburbs.

== See also ==
- Kingdom of the Lombards
- Byzantine Italy
- Catapanate of Italy
- History of Islam in southern Italy

== Sources ==
- Cosentino, Salvatore, ed. (2021). A Companion to Byzantine Italy. Boston-Leiden: Brill.
- Kreutz, Barbara M. (1996). Before the Normans: Southern Italy in the Ninth and Tenth Centuries. Philadelphia: University of Pennsylvania Press.
- Loud, Graham A. (1999). "Southern Italy in the tenth century". New Cambridge Medieval History. Vol. 3. Cambridge: Cambridge University Press. pp. 624–645.
- Loud, Graham A. (2013) [2000]. The Age of Robert Guiscard: Southern Italy and the Norman Conquest. London and New York: Routledge.
- Peters, Edward; Foulke, William D., eds. (2003) [1907]. Paul the Deacon: History of the Lombards. Philadelphia: University of Pennsylvania Press.
- Wickham, Chris (1981). Early Medieval Italy: Central Power and Local Society, 400-1000. Totowa, NJ: Barnes & Noble.
