= Duke (Lombard) =

Military family commander

Among the Lombards, the duke or dux was the man who acted as political and military commander of a set of "military families" (the Fara), irrespective of any territorial appropriation.

== Etymology ==
The proper Lombardic language term for the figure of the duke is not known; the oldest Lombard historiographical sources (the anonymous Origo gentis Langobardorum and Historia Langobardorum of Paul the Deacon) were written in Latin. The Latin word dux was adopted to designate a political and military figure that had no exact equivalent in the classical world, thus redefining the concept of "duke" in a form that would continue to develop in later centuries.

== History ==
The figure of the Duke emerged between the 4th and 5th centuries, after the Germanic peoples settled between the Elbe and the current northern Bohemia. At that time the Lombards were nomads, forming homogeneous groups and compact families originating from the same noble clan, and able to organize themselves into quotas with military functions: the Fare. The Dukes were the leaders of the Fare. In that office, they were honored as warriors for the dynastic ties and their valor shown in war, and later rewarded by the king. The figure of the Lombard Duke encompassed a mixture of military, noble, sacral (invested by the king, attended his "charisma"), political, judicial, and administrative elements. In the assembly of the people in arms ("Gairethinx"), the dukes had a prominent role, and were decisive in the election of the king.

Once in Italy, the ducal institution gradually became linked with the territory, but always subordinate to the political-military status of the Duke. Since the first city conquered by Alboin in 568, Cividale, a duke was appointed in any militarily significant urban center, with a mandate to lead the Lombards warriors settled in nearby areas "in Fara" against any enemy threats. From that first settlement, however, the ducal institution had a dual character: on the one hand, the Duke was a commander of an army, on the other, he was the head of a fraction of the people ( "gens"), and therefore subject to the expectations and traditions (management of power, military activity, division of wealth) of the people themselves. The Duke was thus given a royal investiture and a political-military nature, but at the same time also carried a unique power as a guarantor of a particular social structure (that of the Fara). These coexisting but contradictory factors characterize the Lombard Kingdom, in constant tension between the centralizing impulses of sovereign power and aspirations for autonomy of the Dukes; over the centuries a transition was seen from greater ducal independence (so that for the ten years of the so-called Rule of the Dukes, 574 to 584, they ruled as absolute monarchs in their seats) to a growing assertion of central power, although their aspirations for autonomy were not completely settled.

The Lombard duchies, both in Langobardia Maior and Langobardia Minor, were not abolished with the fall in the realm in 774, and were later incorporated into the Carolingian Empire. The only exception, the Duchy of Benevento, was soon elevated to the rank of principality (though weakened by secessions), retaining its autonomy and indeed playing an important political role until the arrival of the Normans in the 11th century. With the defeat of the Lombard kingdom by the Franks of Charlemagne, the figure of the Lombard Duke was replaced by the Frankish count; however, the Duchy of Benevento remained outside the Carolingian Empire, and maintained a substantial degree of autonomy.

== List of Lombard duchies ==
- Duchy of Friuli
- Duchy of Ceneda
- Duchy of Treviso
- Duchy of Vicenza
- Duchy of Verona
- Duchy of Trent
- Duchy of Parma
- Duchy of Reggio
- Duchy of Piacenza
- Duchy of Brescia
- Duchy of Bergamo
- Duchy of San Giulio
- Duchy of Pavia
- Duchy of Turin
- Duchy of Asti
- Duchy of Tuscany
- Duchy of Spoleto
- Duchy of Benevento, after 774 the Principality of Benevento; later the Principalities of Salerno and Capua gained independence from it
- Duchy of Aosta
- Duchy of Milan
- Duchy of Ivrea
- Duchy of Persiceta

== See also ==
- Fara (Lombard)
- Lombards
- Lombard Kingdom

== Sources ==
- Paul Deacon, Historia Langobardorum (Storia dei Longobardi, Lorenzo Valla/Mondadori, Milan 1992)

== Bibliography ==
- Lidia Capo. Comment to Paul Deacon (1992). Lidia Capo (ed.). Storia dei Longobardi (in Italian). Milan: Lorenzo Valla/Mondadori. ISBN 88-04-33010-4.
- Jarnut, Jörg (1995) [1982]. Storia dei Longobardi (in Italian). Translated by Guglielmotti, Paola. Torino: Einaudi. ISBN 88-06-13658-5.
- Rovagnati, Sergio (2003). I Longobardi (in Italian). Milano: Xenia. ISBN 88-7273-484-3.
