= Notitia de actoribus regis =

The Notitia de actoribus regis ("Notice concerning royal administrators") is a series of six decrees (praecepta) promulgated by the Lombard king of Italy, Liutprand, around 733. Collectively they "detailed the duties and responsibilities of the men selected to administer royal curtes," the men referenced as actores in the title. Liutprand was a prolific legislator. Besides the Notitia, he added 152 titles to the Edictum Rothari of his predecessor. The Notitia is "essentially a forerunner of the Carolingian capitulary".

The Latin term curtis (plural curtes) originally denoted "a complex of landed property" and came during the Lombard period to refer to the house of a free man (liber homo) with its surrounding buildings and orchards before settling to mean the administrative centre of a lord's estates. Agricultural matters were overseen by a villicus and domestic ones by a ministerialis and both were usually of the servile class, aldii. A lord, such as the king, had many curtes, each with its dominicum (the demesne), the original estate directly administered by the lord's servants, and its massaricium, the manors (mansi) owned by the lord but farmed by free or servile peasants. A curtis could be contiguous but was more often a scattering of domains in several proximal villages; it was thus an administrative, not a geographical, unit.

The main purpose of the Notitia was to prevent the usurpation of public land by local officials. The first requirement of a potential actor was to swear on the Gospels that "if I should learn of anything that is against the regulations, I will make this known [facio notitiam] to the king, so that the matter will be resolved." The term notitia may indicate a written notice or report, since the written law is itself referred to as part of a notitia. The law further declares that the government was in possession of a "list of all the territories that pertained to those estates". Any purchase of royal property by one of the king's servants was to be confirmed by a royal charter and the prices were stipulated "in the edict".

== Editions ==
- Georg Pertz, ed. "Notitia de actoribus regis". Mon. Germ. Hist., Leges, IV: 180–82.

== Sources ==
- Everett, Nicholas. "Literacy and the Law in Lombard Government". Early Medieval Europe 2000 9(1): 93–127.
- Tabacco, Giovanni. The Struggle for Power in Medieval Italy: Structures of Political Rule. Cambridge: Cambridge University Press, 1989.
- Wickham, Christopher. Early Medieval Italy: Central Power and Local Society, 400–1000. London: Macmillan, 1981.
