= Lombardic language =

Extinct Germanic language

Lombardic
- Langobardic
- Region: Pannonia and Italy
- Extinct: Late 8th century
- Language family: Indo-European: Germanic; West Germanic; Upper German; Lombardic
- Writing system: Runic script, Latin script

Language codes
- ISO 639-3: lng
- Glottolog: None
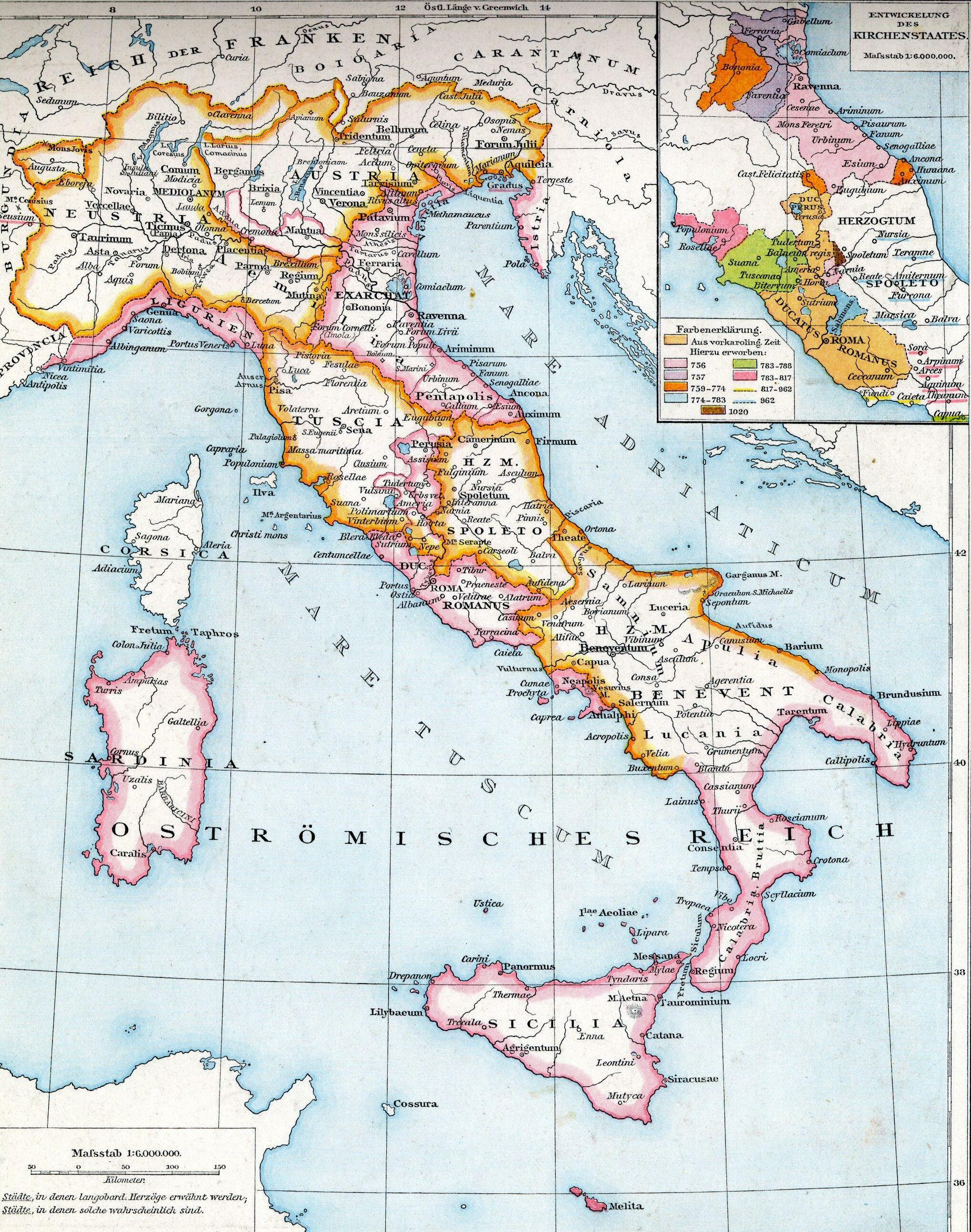
- Italy at the time of the Lombards

Lombardic, Langobardic or Langobardian (German: Langobardisch) is an extinct West Germanic language that was spoken by the Lombards (Langobardi), the Germanic people who settled in present-day Italy in the sixth century and established the Kingdom of the Lombards. It was already declining by the seventh century because the invaders quickly adopted the Vulgar Latin spoken by the local population. Many toponyms in modern Lombardy and Greater Lombardy (Northern Italy) and items of the Lombard language and broader Gallo-Italic vocabulary derive from Lombardic.

Lombardic is a Trümmersprache (literally, 'rubble-language'), that is, a language preserved only in fragmentary form: there are no texts in Lombardic, only individual words and personal names cited in Latin law codes, histories and charters. As a result, there are many aspects of the language about which nothing is known.

== Classification ==
Lombardic is classified as part of the Upper German group of West Germanic languages and most closely related to its geographical neighbours Alemannic and Bavarian. This is consistent with the accounts of classical historians, and indeed with the archaeological evidence of Langobardic settlement along the river Elbe.

In view of the lack of Lombardic texts and the narrow scope of the attested Lombardic vocabulary—almost entirely nouns in the nominative case and proper names—the classification rests entirely on phonology. Here the clear evidence of the Second Sound Shift and the conditioned monophthongization of *ai shows that the language falls within the range of Old High German varieties, rather than grouping with North Sea Germanic or East Germanic, as some earlier scholars proposed. However, due to the poor state of preservation, Langobardic is often excluded from Old High German.

== The Lombardic Corpus ==
The main evidence for Lombardic comes from contemporary documents written in Latin, where (a) individual Lombardic terms are cited and (b) people with Lombardic names are mentioned. There are also a small number of inscriptions, a handful of which use the runic alphabet. Additional information about the vocabulary of Lombardic comes from later-attested loan words into Italian and its dialects, as well as a large number of Italian place names of Lombardic origin (see below).

The documentary sources fall into three categories:

1. Lombardic law codes
2. Narrative histories
3. Administrative documents of the Lombard kingdom such as charters.

== Phonology ==
Establishing sound values for Lombardic is problematic for two reasons. Where words are attested in contemporary Lombardic documents, scribes trained in Latin could not be expected to record accurately, or even consistently, the sounds of Lombardic. In the case of loanwords, these are often attested much later, by which time their form will have been affected not only by the adaptation to the phonology of the various Gallo-Italic languages but also by subsequent sound changes in the development of Italian.

=== Vowels ===
Lombardic displays most of the vocalic developments found in early Old High German,, especially early Upper German (Bavarian and Alemannic).

- Umlaut is not attested in Langobardic names and vocabulary items until the 8th century. However, Langobardic loanwords found in Italian dialects indicate that Langobardic had undergone Umlaut of at least the vowels /*a/ and /*u/ to /*e/ and /*y/ respectively when preceded by unstressed /i/ and sometimes /j/: Pescia from Proto- Germanic *baki ("stream", cf. Old High German behhi) and micc(i)are from Proto-West Germanic *mukja- ("to espy", cf. modern Upper German mücken).
- The Germanic diphthongs /ai/ and /au/ are preserved in Lombardic, whereas they are raised to /ei/ and /ou/ respectively in other Old High German dialects: Examples: Lgb. schuldhais = OHG scultheizo ("mayor"); Lgb. Laubia = OHG louba ("arbor, gallery").
  - similarly to all other dialects, Lombardic monophthongizes /ai/ to /a:/ or /e:/ before /r/ and to /e:/ before /w/ in the 8th century. Examples: early Lgb. gaire- vs. later Lgb. Gari-bald (personal name), both from Germanic *gaiza- "spear".
  - unlike other Old High German dialects, attested Lombardic does not monophthongize /au/ to /ō/ before a dental. Example: Lgb. launegild = OHG lôngelt ("payment").
- Lombardic preserves Proto- Germanic /*ē²/ and /ō/ as monophthongs (mêta = OHG miata "price"; plôvum = OHG phluog ("plough").
- Lombardic words in Latin often appear to preserve Germanic /u i/ before /r l/, and /ī/ often appears as <e>, unlike other High German dialects (e.g. fulcfree); however, this may be a case of hypercorrection by Romance-speaking scribes writing in Latin rather than a genuine reflection of Lombardic pronunciation.

=== Consonants ===
Lombardic participated in and indeed shows some of the earliest evidence for the High German consonant shift. The shift causes the Germanic stop consonants /p t k/ to shift to /pf ts kx/, with simplification to /f(f) s(s) x/ in some positions. In Langobardic, the shift of /p/ to /f/ and /t/ to /ts/ is well attested, whereas the shift of /k/ to /kx/ is only attested within a word before a vowel:

- Lgb. gafand (= modern German Pfand "pledge" - Germanic /p/)
- Lgb. stolesaz "chamberlain" (second element cognate to English seat - Germanic /t/)
- Lgb. Facho (personal name - Germanic /k/)

A related shift, the Medienverschiebung (/b d g/ to /p t k/) is attested inconsistently. It is attested most frequently for /b/ to /p/ and inconsistently for /g/ to /k/:

- Lgb. baro "man" but also pans "command" (both Germanic /b/)
- Lgb. gathungi "size of a meadow" but also crapuuorf "throwing a corpse from a grave" (both Germanic /g/)

The shift of /p t k/ to /pf ts x/ is already found in the earliest Langobardic attestations in the 500s CE; the shift of /b d g/ to /p t k/ appears to have been in progress by the end of the 600s.

This sound change left two different sets of nouns in the Italian language: palco (< Lombardic palk, "beam") vs. balcone (< Lombardic balk, "wood platform"); panca (< Lombardic panka) vs. banca (Lombardic banka, "bench").

== Decline ==
It is not possible to say with certainty when the Lombardic language died out and there are divergent views on the issue. It seems certain that it was in decline even before the end of the Lombardic kingdom in 774, though it may have survived longer in Northern areas, with their denser Lombardic settlement. In any case, the Lombard host which had invaded Italy was not monolingual: in addition to a sizeable body of Saxons, there were also "Gepids, Bulgars, Sarmatians, Pannonians, Suevi, Noricans and so on" (Historia Langobardorum, II, 26).

In the areas of Italy settled by the Lombards, "there followed a rapid mixing of Roman and barbarian, especially among the population settled on the land." The Lombard conversion from Arianism to Roman Catholicism in the 7th century would have removed a major barrier to the integration of the two populations. By the 8th century speakers of Lombardic were bilingual, adopting the local Gallo-Italic language.

Even as use of the language declined, Lombardic personal names remained popular, though they gradually lost their connection to the source language, adopting Latin endings. The 8th century also saw the development of hybrid names with both Lombardic and Latin elements (e.g. Alipertulus = Lgb Alipert + Lat. -ulus). By this time occurrence of both Lombardic and Latin names within a single family "is so widespread that such cases make up the majority throughout Lombard Italy".

Explicit evidence of the death of Lombardic comes in the late 10th century: the Salerno Chronicle mentions the "German language which the Lombards previously spoke" (lingua todesca, quod olim Langobardi loquebantur, cap. 38). But some knowledge of Lombardic remained: the Salerno chronicler nonetheless knows that the Lombardic term stoleseyz includes an element which means "sitting" (sedendo). As late as 1003, a charter uses the Lombardic term scarnafol ("filthy fellow") as an insult.

While the Cimbrian language has sometimes been connected with Lombardic, this theory has been disproved by the chronological distance between the last mention of Lombardic speakers (1000 CE) and the first appearance of the Cimbrians (1200s), a time when Lombardy was already fully Romance-speaking.

== Influence on Italian and Lombard ==
=== Loan words ===
At least 280 Italian words have been identified as Lombardic loans, though there is wide local variation and some are found only in areas settled by the Lombards. One problem in detecting Lombardic loans is that they are not always readily distinguishable from Gothic, the language of the previous Germanic rulers of Italy. In many cases, it is only evidence of the Second Sound Shift, which did not affect Gothic, that guarantees a Lombardic source for a loanword. However, the Sound Shift is equally present in Alemannic and Bavarian, which are also potential sources of loans into Northern Italian varieties at this period.

The main areas of the Lombardic vocabulary surviving in Italian are: warfare and weapons, the law, government and society, housebuilding and the household, objects and activities from daily life. Of these, however, Lombardic government and legal terms were to a great extent superseded by the Gallo-Roman vocabulary of the Frankish conquest. The predominance of loans relating to daily life "would appear to be a sign that the Longobards fitted in and integrated with the locals at a grass-roots level."

Examples:

- anca, "hip" < lgb. hanka
- balcone, "balcony", and palco, "shelf" < lgb. balk
- bussare, "knock" < lgb bauʒʒan
- faida, "blood feud" <lgb. faihida
- graffa, "brace" < lgb. krāpfo "hook"
- guancia "cheek", < lgb wangja
- gufo, "owl" < lgb. gôfjan "cry out"
- lesto, "fast" < lgb. list "cleverness"
- melma, "mud" < lgb. melm
- nocca, "knuckle" < lgb. knohha
- panca, "bench" < lgb. banka, panka
- russare, "snore" < lgb. hrûʒʒan
- scaglia, "scale, skin" < lgb. skalja
- taccola, "jackdaw" < lgb tâhhala
- zazzera, "mop of hair" < lgb. zazza.

The Lombard language is a distinct Romance language spoken in Northern Italy and Switzerland. It, too, has loans from Lombardic. The following examples come from Bergamasque, an Eastern Lombard dialect.

- blösen, "chopped hay" < lgb. blôsem ("flower")
- breda, "cultivated field" < lgb. braida ("open plain")
- garb, "sour, unripe" < lgb. harwi
- margnöch, "stubborn" < lgb. mahr + knohha ("horse" + "bone/head")
- ròsta, "railing" < lgb. hrausta ("bundle of branches")
- scagna, it. scranna, "chair" < lgb. skranna ("bench")
- strobià:, "to clean the house" < lgb. straufinôn ("to rub away").

=== Place names ===
When the Lombards settled in Italy they had no previous acquaintance with Latin, with the result that the earliest Lombard settlements received Lombardic names. There are a number of distinct types of name.

Each Lombard duke was the lord of a group of military clans, who were settled in the area he ruled. The Lombardic term for such a clan was fara, and it has given its name (or the variant farra) to a number of Italian settlements, including:

- Fara Filiorum Petri, Chieti, Abruzzo
- Fara Gera d'Adda, Bergamo, Lombardy
- Fara San Martino, Chieti, Abruzzo
- Fara in Sabina, Rieti, Lazio
- Fara Novarese, Novara, Piedmont
- Fara Olivana con Sola, Bergamo, Lombardy
- Fara Vicentino, Vicenza, Veneto
- Farra d'Alpago, Belluno, Veneto
- Farra di Soligo, Treviso, Veneto
- Farra d'Isonzo, Gorizia, Friuli-Venezia Giulia

Many settlements took their names from Lombardic personal names. For example the Lombardic name Gairo ("spear") is the source of: Noci Garrioni (Cremona), Garin (Turin), Garini (Cuneo and Alessandria), Carengo (Novara), Ghiringhello (Verona), Gairilo (Brescia), Ghirla, (Verona), Garlasco (Pavia), Garleri (Porto Maurizio), and Garlazzolo (Pavia). Gamillscheg counts over 700 of these.

In many cases a Lombard personal name was appended to the Latin word for a natural feature. Thus Latin collis ("hill") appears coupled with, for example, lgb. Alibert in Colle-Alberti (Florence, Pisa), lgb. Gunzo in Collegonzi (Florence), and Raginwald in Collerinaldo (Aquila).

Finally, there are over 30 Lombardic common nouns which have formed the basis for Italian place names, including:

- Lgb. berga ("mountain") > Berghi (Trient), Berga (Vicenza), Valperga (Turin)
- Lgb. skuldhaizo ("mayor") > Scaldasole (Pavia), Casale di Scodosia (Padua)
- Lgb. stôdigard ("stud farm") > Stoerda (Novara) (cf. Stuttgart).

=== Personal names ===
A number of Lombardic personal names survive in modern Italy (for example, Aldo), but where they have it is mostly in the form of a surname: Ansaldo, Grimaldi, Garibaldi, Landolfi, Pandolfi, Siccardi are all of Lombardic origin.

== Sources ==
=== Latin ===
There are a number of Latin texts that include Lombardic names, and Lombardic legal texts contain terms taken from the legal vocabulary of the vernacular, including:

- Origo gentis Langobardorum (7th century)
- Paulus Diaconus, Historia Langobardorum c. 790 AD
- Historia Langobardorum codicis Gothani (9th century)
- Edictum Rothari (643 AD)

In 2006, Emilia Denčeva argued that the inscription of the Pernik sword may be Lombardic.

=== Runic ===
There are two short inscriptions in the Elder Futhark which are regarded as Lombardic.

The Schretzheim bronze capsule, from 540–590:

- On the lid: arogis d
- On the bottom: alaguþleuba dedun

Translation: "Arogis and Alaguth (and) Leuba made (it)"

The Futhark on the Breza half-column

The two fibulae from Bezenye, Hungary, from 510–590.

- Fibula A: godahid unj[a]
- Fibula B: (k?)arsiboda segun

Translation: "Godahi(l)d, (with) sympathy (I?) Arsiboda bless"

There is debate as to whether the inscription on the fifth-century Szabadbattyán belt buckle is Lombardic or Gothic, and the reading is uncertain. The futhark on the Breza half-column is regarded as either Lombardic or Alemannic.
