= Corpus language =

Preserved language with no living speakers

A corpus language is a language that has no living speakers but for which numerous records produced by its native speakers survive. Examples of corpus languages are Ancient Greek, Latin, the Egyptian language, Old English, Old Norse, Elamite, and Sanskrit. Some corpus languages, such as Ancient Greek and Latin, left very large corpora and therefore can be fully reconstructed, even though some details of pronunciation may be unclear. Such languages can be used even today, as is the case with Sanskrit and Latin.

Other languages have such limited corpora that some important words—e.g., some pronouns—are lacking in the corpora. Examples of these are Ugaritic and Gothic. Languages attested only by a few words, often names, and a few phrases, are called Trümmersprache (literally "rubble languages") in German linguistics. These can be reconstructed only in a very limited way, and often their genetic relationship to other languages remains unclear. Examples are Dalmatian, Etruscan, also known as Rasenna, Dadanitic, a Semitic language that may be close to classical Arabic, Lombardic, Burgundian, Vandalic, and Oscan, Umbrian, and Faliscan, all Italic languages that were related to Latin.

Corpus languages are studied using the methods of corpus linguistics, but corpus linguistics can also be used (and is commonly used) for the study of the writings and other records of living languages.

Not all extinct languages are corpus languages, since there are many extinct languages in which few or no writings or other records survive, as is the case with the vast majority of languages that have ever existed.

== See also ==
- Endangered language
- Language death
