= Lombard syllogae =

Many travellers in Lombard Italy during the sixth through eighth centuries wrote down inscriptions in syllogae (singular sylloge), providing an important record of what was left of ancient Rome during the Lombard period. Generally written by Anglo-Saxons, the syllogae demonstrate that inscriptions were plentiful along the via Flaminia and in the city of Rome.

The reasons for recording inscriptions varied. Some are interested solely in inscriptions on churches and Christian monuments. These, like Sylloge einsiedlensis from the time of Charlemagne and Pope Hadrian I, often include itineraries of "the places of the saints" (loca sanctorum), for the benefit of fellow pilgrims, and reports of the liturgical practices of the Patria sancti Petri. Others, like the Sylloge laureshamensis, contain classical and pagan inscriptions with references to emperors, important personages, titles and offices. The author of the Laureshamensis traversed the peninsula between Rome and Ivrea, passing through Milan, Pavia, Piacenza, Ravenna, Spoleto and Vercelli. He had a special interest in metrical inscriptions and his Piacentine collection he divided under the headings RITHM and METR, indicating rhythmic and hexametric metre, respectively.

The Sylloge centulensis, from an eighth- or ninth-century manuscript of the monastery of Corvey, compiled on a trip from Rome to Spoleto to Ravenna, records "what we might term Petrean poetry", a style lying between classical and medieval forms. The seventh-century Sylloge turonensis concentrates on the monuments of Rome. Later examples include the Sylloge parisina, the Sylloge virdunensis and the Sylloge wirceburgensis.

The surviving syllogae were first edited and studied by the archaeologist Giovanni Battista de Rossi, who published them in the first part of the second volume of his monumental Inscriptiones christianae urbis Romae septimo saeculo antiquiores (Rome: 1857, 1861–88).

== Sources ==
- Everett, Nicholas. Literacy in Lombard Italy, c. 568–774. Cambridge: Cambridge University Press, 2003.
