= Jörg Jarnut =

German historian (1942–2023)

Jörg Jaranut
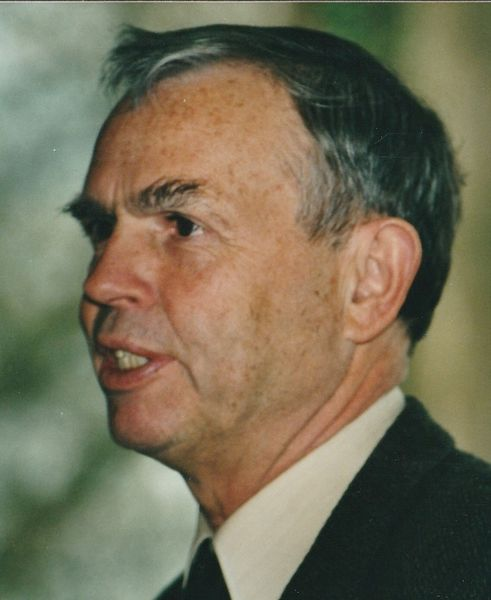
- Born: 1 March 1942; Weimar, Gau Thuringia, Germany
- Died: 6 March 2023 (aged 81); Lippstadt, North Rhine-Westphalia, Germany

Academic background
- Education: University of Bonn
- Academic advisor: Egen Ewig

Academic work
- Discipline: History
- Sub-discipline: Medieval studies
- Institutions: Paderborn University
- Main interests: Kingdom of the Lombards

Jörg Jarnut (1 March 1942 – 6 March 2023) was a German historian who was Chair of Medieval History at the University of Paderborn from 1983 to 2007.

== Biography ==
Jörg Jarnut was born in Weimar, Germany on 1 March 1942. He gained his PhD at the University of Bonn under the supervision of Eugen Ewig in 1970 with a dissertation on the prosopography of the Kingdom of the Lombards. He gained his habilitation under Ewig in 1977 with a thesis on the history of Bergamo. Since 1980, Jarnut was an associate professor at the University of Bonn. From 1983 to 2007, Jarnut was Chair of Medieval History at the Paderborn University. Jarnut specialized in the study of the history of the Early Middle and High Middle Ages.

== Works ==
- Prosopographische und sozialgeschichtliche Studien zum Langobardenreich in Italien (568–774). Bonn: Ludwig Röhrscheid Verlag. 1972. ISBN 3-7928-0312-7.
- Bergamo 568–1098: Verfassungs-, Sozial- und Wirtschaftsgeschichte einer lombardischen Stadt im Mittelalter. Wiesbaden: Franz Steiner Verlag. 1979. ISBN 3-515-02789-0.
- Geschichte der Langobarden. Stuttgart: Kohlhammer Verlag. 1982. ISBN 3-17-007515-2.
- Agilolfingerstudien. Untersuchungen zur Geschichte einer adligen Familie im 6. und 7. Jahrhundert. Stuttgart: Anton Hiersemann. 1986. ISBN 3-7772-8613-3.

== Sources ==
- "Herr Prof. Dr. Jörg Jarnut". University of Paderborn.
