= Pandolfi =

Pandolfi may refer to:

- Alberto Pandolfi, Peruvian politician
- Claudia Pandolfi, Italian actress
- Elio Pandolfi, Italian actor
- Emile Pandolfi, American pianist
- Fernando Pandolfi, Argentine footballer
- Filippo Maria Pandolfi, Italian politician
- Giovanni Antonio Pandolfi (c. 1540-c. 1581), Italian painter
- Giovanni Antonio Pandolfi [Mealli] (1624-1687), Italian composer
- Giovanni Giacomo Pandolfi (1567-1636), Italian painter
- Jono Pandolfi, American ceramicist
- Nicholas Pandolfi, English actor
- Pier Paolo Pandolfi, Italian-American research geneticist
