= Giulio Cesare Croce =

Italian writer and actor

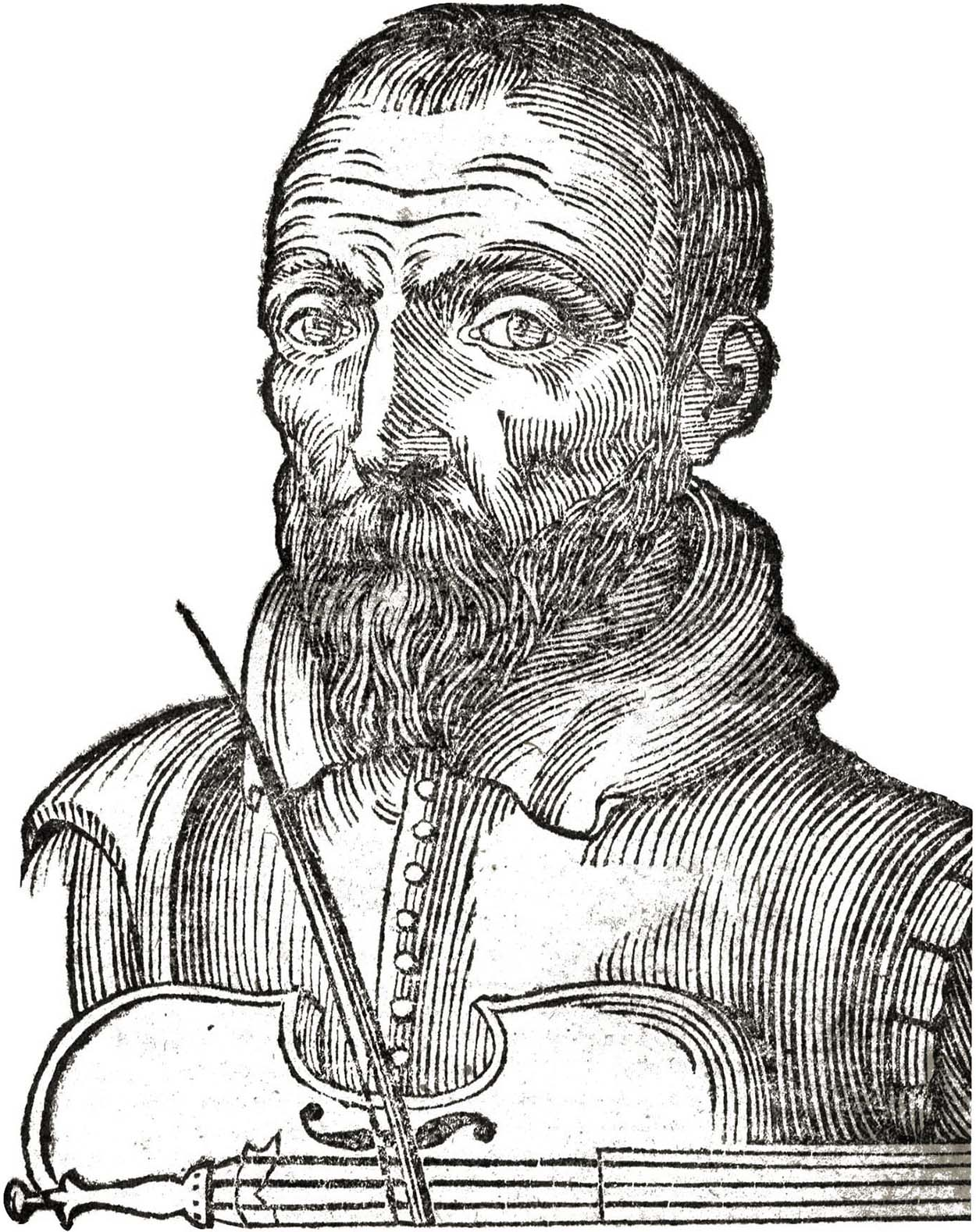
- Giulio Cesare Croce
- Born: 1550; San Giovanni in Persiceto near Bologna, Emilia Romagna, Italy
- Died: 1609 (aged 58–59); Bologna, Emilia Romagna
- Occupations: writer, actor/producer of cantastoria and enigma writer
- Movement: Late Renaissance

Giulio Cesare Croce (1550–1609) was an Italian writer, actor/producer of cantastoria and enigma writer.

The son of a blacksmith and a blacksmith himself, after the death of his father, his uncle continued his cultural education. He never had any particular patron but was still able to gradually leave the family business to pursue his passion: storytelling. He had an enormous success and was able to travel to fairs, markets, patrician houses, and the Italian courts. His presentations were complemented by a violin. His prolific literary production was contingent upon his own transcriptions of his shows.

He was married twice and had 14 children. He died in poverty.

== His life and choices ==
He had little formal training or teachers and can therefore be considered one of the most successful self-taught authors in Italian literature. Due to his choices, he was never fully part of the literary groups of his time.

To be a literary man in his period meant living at court, having patrons, or else being left to one's own devices for financial purposes. Croce was never a true literary man in the strictest sense of the word since he preferred laymen audiences to the court. In fact, he was principally a storyteller and a blacksmith and most likely wrote for his own personal satisfaction. As such, his stories and inspiration come from the lower class, from the audiences at the market, who, if able to read, bought his works. This is in stark opposition to many contemporary authors who were inspired by the whims of their patrons.

== Bertoldo ==
One of the few of his more than 400 published works to be translated into English, Bertoldo was a popular story among the people of his time. Bertoldo is a story that had various versions in the Middle Ages, taking place in the court of the king Alboin in either Verona or Pavia, depending on the version. In its most organic version, that of Croce (Le sottilissime astutie di Bertoldo, 1606), Bertoldo is from Roverè. Some of its raunchy language was softened, as was the edge of revenge against the powerful commoner in some of the other variations. One of his sources for the story was the Dialogus Salomonis et Marcolphi.

To his first Bertoldo, Croce wrote a sequel called Le piacevoli et ridicolose simplicità di Bertoldino, 1608, (about the son of Bertoldo, in the charge of his mother Marcolfa). Later (1620), the abbot Adriano Banchieri wrote another sequel called Novella di Cacasenno, figliuolo del semplice Bertoldino. Since then, the work of Croce is often published alongside under the title Bertoldo, Bertoldino e Cacasenno from which three films were inspired under the same title in 1936, 1954 and 1984 (the last by Mario Monicelli).

In Bertoldo, Croce may have shown his secret aspirations, the crude lout and the self-taught, the presence at court was his hope for his future, with which he hoped to solve his problems. The liberty of thought and action that Bertoldo had at court may show Croce's desire to live vicariously through his character by having a patron, like many of his counterparts, but without having to pay homage to them.

== Books and Comedies ==
He wrote more than 400 works in Italian and Bolognese dialect.

=== Books ===
- Le sottilissime astuzie di Bertoldo
- Le piacevoli e ridicolose simplicità di Bertoldino, figlio del già astuto Bertoldo
- Descrizione della vita del Croce (autobiography in verse)
- I banchetti di mal cibati (on the plague of 1590)
- La sollecita e studiosa Accademia de' Golosi
- L'eccellenza e il trionfo del porco
- Le ventisette mascherate piacevolissime (dedicated to the venetian Berenice Gozzadina Gozadini)

=== Comedies ===
- La Farinella
- Il tesoro
- Sandrone astuto
- Sandrone astuto
- Il tesoro
- Cavalcata di varij lenguazi
- Sogno del Zani
- Dispute fra Cola et Arlechino
- Dai Dialoghi curiosi
- Vanto ridicoloso del Trematerra
- La gran vittoria di Pedrolino contra il Dottor Gratiano Scatolone
- La canzone di Catarinon
- Vocabulario Gratianesco
- Conclusiones quinquaginta tres sustintà in Franculin dal macilent Signor Grazian Godga...
- Sbravate, razzate e arcibullate dell'arcibravo Smedolla uossi...
- Disputa fra Cola Sgariatore, ed Arlechino da Marcaria sopra le lor prodezze
- Utrom del Dottore Graziano Partesana da Francolino
