= Marco Salvador =

Italian writer and historian (1948–2022)

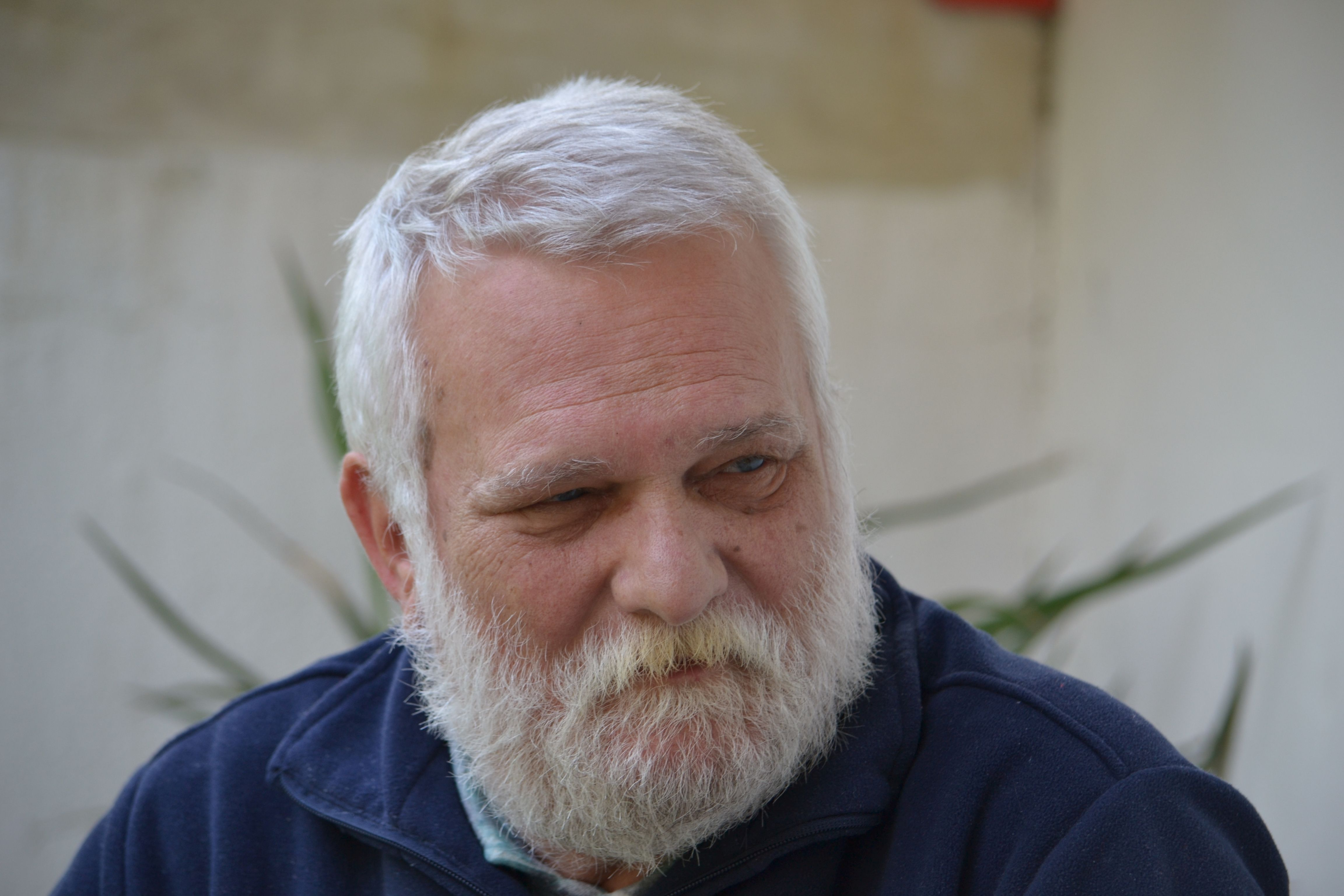
Marco Salvador

Marco Salvador (10 November 1948 – 16 February 2022) was an Italian writer and historian.

== Biography ==
Born in San Lorenzo di Arzene, Friuli, Salvador published several historical essays, especially about the Middle Ages. He also published six historical novels, starting with Il Longobardo (2004), which focuses on the story of the Lombard 7th-century king Rothari, and with which he won the "Città di Cuneo" award. This was followed by La vendetta del Longobardo (2005) and L'ultimo Longobardo, both set during the Lombard domination of Italy.

His last novel, La palude degli eroi (2009), is set in the 13th century, and tells the last years of the rule of the Ghibelline lord Ezzelino IV da Romano.

Salvador died on 16 February 2022, at the age of 73.

== Bibliography ==
- Il Longobardo (2004)
- La casa del quarto comandamento (2004)
- La vendetta del Longobardo (2005)
- L'ultimo longobardo (2006)
- Il maestro di giustizia (2007)
- La palude degli eroi (2009)
- L'educazione friulana (2010)
