= Gairethinx =

Lombard legal ceremony

The gairethinx ("spear assembly") was a Lombard ceremony in which edicts and laws were affirmed by the army. It may have involved the entire army banging their spears on their shields; or it may have been a much quieter event.

In 643, the Edict of Rothari was approved by the exercitus Langobardorum gathered in Pavia (the Lombard capital), and by a typical act: per gairethinx, meaning "in the assembly of the lances", or, more precisely, "by striking shields with lances".

It is etymologically related to the Thing of the Vikings and Anglo-Saxons and the Althing of Iceland.

== See also ==
- Kingdom of the Lombards
