= Aldii =

Aldii were semifree in Germanic law. Employees of a patron, they had a position intermediate between freedom and slavery but ended up sometimes being confused with the serfs. Deprived of political and military rights and related to the land that they cultivated, they could, however, marry and be defended in court, and they were entitled to wergild (but the amount is less than that of free men) and, within limits, to their property.
