= 610s =

Decade

The 610s decade ran from January 1, 610, to December 31, 619.

== Events ==
=== 610 ===
==== By place ====
====== Byzantine Empire ======
- October 4 – Heraclian revolt: Heraclius arrives with a fleet from Africa at Constantinople. Assisted by an uprising in the capital, he overthrows and personally beheads Emperor Phocas. Heraclius gains the throne with help from his father Heraclius the Elder. His first major act is to change the official language of the Eastern Roman Empire from Latin to Greek (already the language of the vast majority of the population). Because of this, after AD 610, the Empire is customarily referred to as the Byzantine Empire (the term Byzantine is a modern term invented by historians in the 18th century; the people of the Empire itself always referred to themselves as "Ρωμαῖος" — tr. Rōmaios, Roman).

====== Europe ======
- The Avars invade the Duchy of Friuli, an important buffer between the Kingdom of the Lombards in Italy and the Slavs. During the fighting Gisulf II dies and his duchy is overrun (approximate date).
- King Witteric is assassinated during a banquet at Toledo, by a faction of Catholic nobles. He is succeeded by Gundemar, duke of Narbonne, who becomes king of the Visigoths in Hispania.
- King Theuderic II loses Alsace, Champagne and Thurgau to his elder brother Theudebert II of Austrasia. His Burgundian army is defeated east of the Jura Mountains against the Alemanni.
- The Volga Bulgaria arises on the territory of modern Russia, being the first civilization in the region to arise from the Early Slavs (approximate date).

====== Britain ======
- Selyf ap Cynan succeeds his father Cynan Garwyn as king of Powys (Wales).

==== By topic ====
====== Arts and sciences ======
- Paper technology is imported into Japan from China by the Korean Buddhist priest, Dam Jing (approximate date).

====== Religion ======
- Muhammad, Islamic prophet, begins at 40 years old to preach a religion which will be called Islam. According to Islamic teachings, the angel Gabriel appears to him in a cave on Mount Hira near Mecca (Saudi Arabia) and calls him: "The Prophet of Allah". Muhammad gathers followers, reciting to them the first verses of Qur'an(Iqra), thus beginning the revelation of the Qur'an.
- Pope Boniface IV presides over a Council of Rome for the restoration of monastic discipline. Attendees include Mellitus, first bishop of London.
- Columbanus and Gallus begin their missionary work in Bregenz, near Lake Constance (Switzerland).
- John V (the Merciful) becomes patriarch of Alexandria (approximate date).

=== 611 ===
==== By place ====
====== Persian Empire ======
- Byzantine–Persian War: The Persian army under Shahrbaraz captures Antioch, and most of the remaining Byzantine fortresses in Syria and Mesopotamia. King Khosrau II is re-establishing a neo-Persian Empire, and intensifies his war effort. The Byzantine army, ruined by defeat and corruption, offers only half-hearted opposition.

====== Britain ======
- Cynegils becomes king of the West Saxons, or Wessex, after the death of his uncle Ceolwulf (according to the Anglo-Saxon Chronicle). He rules from 611 to 643 and shares power to some extent with his eldest son, Cwichelm, who may have been given Upper Wessex (approximate date).

==== By topic ====
====== Religion ======
- The Four Gates Pagoda, located in central Shandong Province (East China), is completed.

=== 612 ===
==== By place ====
====== Byzantine Empire ======
- August 13 – Empress Eudokia, wife of Heraclius, dies of epilepsy. She leaves two children, and is buried in the Church of the Holy Apostles in Constantinople.

====== Europe ======
- King Theudebert II is defeated by his brother Theuderic II at Toul (northeastern France). He is captured in battle and, after having his royal paraphernalia taken, is handed over to his grandmother Brunhilda. He is put in a monastery, and assassinated with his son Merovech. Theuderic, age 25, becomes sole ruler of Austrasia and Burgundy.
- Sisebut succeeds Gundemar as king of the Visigoths. He begins a campaign against the remains of Byzantine power in Spania.

====== Asia ======
- Goguryeo–Sui War: Emperor Yángdi invades Goguryeo (Korea) with an expeditionary force of over one million men, named the "24 Armies".
- Battle of Salsu: A Sui force of 305,000 men is defeated by the Korean general Ŭlchi Mundŏk at the Yalu River; only 2,700 troops survive.

====== Mesoamerica ======
- October 22 – Sak Kʼukʼ succeeds her father Ajen Yohl Mat, as queen of the Maya state of Palenque (modern Mexico).

==== By topic ====
====== Religion ======
- Columbanus moves to Italy and establishes the monastery of Bobbio (approximate date).
- The Holy Sponge is brought to Constantinople from Palestine.
- Arnulf, counselor of Theudebert II, becomes bishop of Metz.
- Gallus founds the monastery of St. Gallen (Switzerland).

=== 613 ===
==== By place ====
====== Byzantine Empire ======
- Emperor Heraclius marries his niece Martina; she becomes empress (Augusta) of the Byzantine Empire. This second marriage is considered to fall within the prohibited degree of kinship, and is approved by the Catholic Church in Constantinople.
- January 22 – Constantine is crowned co-emperor (Caesar) by his father Heraclius and shortly after betrothed to his cousin, Gregoria, daughter of Nicetas. Only 8 months old, Constantine has no real power and his dynastic title is purely ceremonial.
- Byzantine–Persian War: Heraclius appoints himself commander-in-chief, along with his brother Theodore (curopalates), to solidify command of the army.
- Battle of Antioch: Heraclius mobilises a Byzantine expeditionary force to Antioch (Syria), but is completely defeated outside the city by the Persians. Shahin Vahmanzadegan makes further inroads into Central and Western Anatolia. In Syria, Shahrbaraz captures the cities of Damascus, Apamea and Emesa.

====== Europe ======
- King Theuderic II dies of dysentery in the Austrasian capital of Metz, while preparing a campaign against his longtime enemy, Chlothar II. His grandmother Brunhilda attempts to establish a third regency for her illegitimate great-grandson Sigebert II.
- Chlothar II reunites the Frankish Kingdom by ordering the murder of Sigebert II. He accuses Brunhilda, age 70, of killing ten kings of the Franks (according to the Liber Historiae Francorum). She is dragged to death behind a wild horse at Abbeville.

====== Britain ======
- Battle of Chester: King Æthelfrith of Northumbria invades Gwynedd (northwest Wales), in order to route out his old enemy, Edwin of Deira. A united Brythonic force (Gwynedd, Powys, Pengwern and Dumnonian warriors) is defeated near Chester.

====== Asia ======
- Goguryeo–Sui War: Emperor Yángdi crosses the Liao River again, and puts Manchuria under siege. During the campaign Yang Xuangan, an official of the Sui dynasty, starts a rebellion near Luoyang. Fearing attacks from two fronts, Yáng is forced to retreat his army.
- Isanapura becomes the capital of the Cambodian kingdom of Chenla (approximate date).

==== By topic ====
====== Religion ======
- Islam: Muhammad begins preaching in public. He spreads the message of Islam and encourages a personal devotion to God. Quraysh leaders of Mecca oppose any change in the traditional tribal and religious customs.

=== 614 ===
==== By place ====
====== Byzantine Empire ======
- Byzantine–Sasanian War of 602–628:
  - The Levantine cities of Caesarea Maritima, Arsuf, and Tiberias surrender on terms to the Sasanians.
  - Sasanian conquest of Jerusalem: A Persian–Judaean army (26,000 men) commanded by Shahrbaraz captures and sacks Jerusalem, after a 20-day siege against the Byzantine Empire. Somewhere between 57,000 and 66,500 citizens are slain; another 35,000 are enslaved, including the Patriarch Zacharias. Many churches in the city (including the "Church of the Resurrection" or Holy Sepulchre) are burned, and numerous relics, including the True Cross, the Holy Lance, and the Holy Sponge, are carried off to the Persian capital Ctesiphon.
- The Persians destroy the Ghassanid Kingdom (Arabia), a vassal state of the Byzantine Empire (approximate date).

====== Europe ======
- October 18 – King Chlothar II promulgates the Edict of Paris (Edictum Chlotacharii), a sort of Frankish Magna Carta that defends the rights of the Frankish nobles and the church, and regulates the appointment of counts (secular officials in charge of law courts, collecting taxes, and assembling contingents for the army), while it excludes Jews from all civil employment in the Frankish Kingdom.
- The Palace of Diocletian in Split (Croatia) is damaged by the Avars, who sack the nearby city of Salona. The population flees to the walled palace, which is able to hold out.

====== Britain ======
- Battle of Bampton: King Cynegils of Wessex defeats the invading Britons in Dumnonia (modern Devon). They use the Roman road eastward from Exeter to Dorchester, and are intercepted by the West Saxons marching south.

==== By topic ====
====== Religion ======
- The Sudarium of Oviedo is taken from Palestine, after the invasion of the Sassanid Persians.

=== 615 ===
==== By place ====
====== Europe ======
- The Balkans are freely overrun by the Slavs, who settle in large numbers in what is now Bulgaria, Serbia, North Macedonia and parts of Greece. The western territories of modern-day Yugoslavia (Bosnia, Croatia and Dalmatia) suffer raids from the Avars, who settle in this region.
- The Slavs under Chatzon attack in longboats along the coasts of Thessaly, western Anatolia, and various Greek islands. They besiege the Byzantine city of Thessaloniki in a combined land and sea attack. The Slavs with their families encamp before the city walls.
- The city of Epidaurus (Dalmatia) is destroyed by the Avars and Slavic invaders. The Illyrian refugees flee to the nearby island Laus, where they found Dubrovnik (Ragusa). The islands of Rab, Krk and Cres become major food suppliers for the surviving cities of the mainland.
- Eleutherius succeeds John I as exarch of Ravenna. He persecutes those implicated in the murder of John and the judges of the State. After making a courtesy visit to Pope Adeodatus I, Eleutherius captures Naples and kills the rebel leader John of Conza.

====== Britain ======
- Bangor Massacre: The Anglo-Saxons, under King Æthelfrith of Northumbria, after defeating the Kingdom of Powys, finally reach the Irish Sea and massacre 1,200 Christian monks at their monastery, in Bangor (Wales).
- Edwin of Northumbria takes refuge in East Anglia; he marries Cwenburga, daughter of king Cearl of Mercia (according to the Historia ecclesiastica gentis Anglorum).

====== Mesoamerica ======
- July 29 – Queen Sak Kʼukʼ is succeeded by her son Pacal the Great, as ruler of the Maya city state Palenque (Mexico). He begins a building program at his capital, that produces some of Maya civilization's finest art and architecture.

==== By topic ====
====== Religion ======
- May 25 – Pope Boniface IV dies after a 7-year reign, in which he has converted the Pantheon into the Church of "Santa Maria Rotonda". He is succeeded by Adeodatus I (also known as Deusdedit) as the 68th pope of Rome.
- Several of Muhammad's followers begin to emigrate to the Aksumite Empire. They found a small colony there, under the protection of the Christian Ethiopian emperor Așhama ibn Abjar.

=== 616 ===
==== By place ====
====== Byzantine Empire ======
- Byzantine–Sassanid War of 602–628: The Jews of Jerusalem gain complete control over the city; much of Judea and Galilee becomes an autonomous Jewish province of the Persian Empire. The Jewish Temple is rebuilt by Nehemiah ben Hushiel (exilarch of Jerusalem), who establishes a High Priesthood.
- The Persian army under Shahin Vahmanzadegan destroys the city of Sardis, including its synagogue. Its importance is due to a highway, leading from the interior to the Aegean coast. Shahin marches through Anatolia, defeating the Byzantines numerous times.

====== Europe ======
- Adaloald, age 14, succeeds his father Agilulf as Lombard king of Italy. He reigns under his mother Theodelinda as regent. The Lombard Kingdom gradually begins to convert to Catholicism, and establishes peace with the Exarchate of the Byzantine Empire.
- King Sisebut orders in the Council of Toledo that Jews are to convert to Christianity. Children are taken from their parents and put in monasteries, where they learn the teaching of evangelism in the Visigothic Kingdom.

====== Britain ======
- King Rædwald of East Anglia conquers Northumbria (Northern England) at the Battle of the River Idle. King Æthelfrith is killed during the fighting and his children are forced to flee north. His heir, prince Eanfrith (age 26), seeks refuge with his mother's family, probably in Gododdin (modern Scotland), and moves further north into Pictland. Princes Oswald (age 12), Oswiu (age 4) and others escape to the court of King Eochaid Buide of Dál Riata, where they are converted to Christianity by the monks of Iona.
- Rædwald installs Edwin as king of Northumbria, effectively confirming him as bretwalda. He takes power in his native Deira and in Bernicia. His reign marks the domination of Northumbria as leading Anglo-Saxon state of the British Isles.
- February 24 – Æthelberht, the first Christian Anglo-Saxon king, dies in Kent after a 26-year reign. He is succeeded by his pagan son, Eadbald, who promptly marries his stepmother Emma, in accordance with pre-Christian custom.
- King Sæberht of Essex dies after a 12-year reign, and is succeeded by his son Sexred. He rules conjointly with his two brothers Sæward and Sigeberht; they throw out the Christian missionaries and return to paganism.
- The Battle of Chester (Old Welsh: Guaith Caer Legion; Welsh: Brwydr Caer), which separates the (West) Welsh from the 'North' Welsh of Cumbria - marking the formation of Wales, is fought (approximate date).
- Cadfan ap Iago succeeds his father Iago ap Beli, as king of Gwynedd (Wales) (approximate date).

==== By topic ====
====== Religion ======
- Mellitus, bishop of London, is exiled by Sexred and his pagan brothers (Sæward and Sigeberht). He is forced to take refuge in Gaul, and returns to England the following year.
- The Quraish clans begins to boycott Muhammad and Banu Hashem, in order to put pressure on his Muslim followers and his Islamic preachings.
- A shrine on the site of the future Westminster Abbey (London) is founded (approximate date).

=== 617 ===
==== By place ====
====== Byzantine Empire ======
- Byzantine-Sassanid War: The Persian army under Shahin Vahmanzadegan conquers Chalcedon in Anatolia, and reaches the Bosporus, threatening Constantinople. Emperor Heraclius begins peace negotiations, promising an annual tribute of 1,000 talents of gold and silver. Shahin withdraws with his army to Syria, to focus on the invasion of Egypt.
- The Avars send envoys to Constantinople for a meeting with Heraclius. He is warned about an ambush, and flees for safety behind the city walls in time. Angry at the failure to capture the Byzantine emperor, the Avars plunder Thrace and return to the Danube River, carrying off 270,000 people.

====== Europe ======
- Grasulf II becomes the Lombard Duke of Friuli (Italy), after the assassination of his nephews, Tasso and Kakko, in Oderzo.

====== Britain ======
- Sigeberht becomes king of Essex, after his father Sæward and uncle Sexred are killed in battle against the West Saxons.
- Heathens revolt in Kent under King Eadbald. During the uprising Justus, bishop of Rochester, flees to Gaul.
- King Edwin of Northumbria invades and annexes the minor British kingdom of Elmet (approximate date).

====== Asia ======
- September 8 – Battle of Huoyi: Rebel forces under Li Yuān defeat the Sui troops near the Fen River, and capture the Chinese capital, Chang'an. Li has gained support from Shibi, ruler (khagan) of the Eastern Turks, who secures his northern frontier and supplies him with 2,000 horses.
- Winter – Li Yuan demotes Sui emperor Yángdi to the status of Taishang Huang (retired emperor), and declares Yang You emperor, while he gives himself authority over the western Sui commanderies (prefecture), under the title of "Prince of Tang".

==== By topic ====
====== Religion ======
- Meccans begin a boycott of the Banu Hashim clan, to which Islamic prophet Muhammad belongs. A civil war begins in Medina.
- Battle of Bu'ath: The Arabic tribes win an indecisive battle against the Jewish tribe of Banu Qurayza, near the Medinan oasis.

=== 618 ===
==== By place ====
====== Byzantine Empire ======
- Byzantine–Sassanian War: A Persian expeditionary force under Shahrbaraz invades Egypt, and occupies the province. After defeating the Byzantine garrisons in the Nile Valley, the Persians march across the Libyan Desert as far as Cyrene.
- The Persians besiege Alexandria; the defence of the city is led by Nicetas (cousin of emperor Heraclius). The Byzantine resistance is undermined by a blockade of the harbor; the usual grain supplies are cut off from Egypt to Constantinople.

====== Asia ======
- June 18 – The Sui dynasty ends: Rebel leader Li Yuan captures Luoyang, and has Emperor Yángdi murdered. He proclaims himself emperor Gao Zu and establishes the Tang dynasty, one of the most notable dynasties in Chinese history, which will last for almost 300 years.
- October 6 – Battle of Yanshi: Wang Shichong decisively defeats Li Mi, during the transition from Sui to Tang civil war.
- November 29 – Battle of Qianshuiyuan: The Tang dynasty scores a decisive victory over their rival Xue Rengao.
- Tong Yabghu Qaghan becomes the new ruler (khagan) of the Western Turkic Khaganate, founding the Khazar Khaganate. He maintains close relations with the Tang dynasty, and possibly marries into the imperial family.
- Songtsän Gampo becomes the first emperor of the Tibetan Empire, after his father Namri Songtsen is poisoned. During his reign he expands Tibet's power beyond Lhasa (Tibetan Plateau) and the Yarlung Valley.
- Yeongnyu becomes ruler of the Korean kingdom of Goguryeo.

=== 619 ===
==== By place ====
====== Byzantine Empire ======
- Byzantine–Sasanian War: The besieged city of Alexandria is captured by the Persians. Nicetas, cousin of Emperor Heraclius, and Chalcedonian patriarch, John V, flee to Cyprus. King Khosrow II extends his rule southwards along the Nile.
- Heraclius prepares to leave Constantinople and moves the Byzantine capital to Carthage, but is convinced to stay by Sergius I, patriarch of Constantinople. He begins to rebuild the Byzantine army with the aid of funds from church treasures.
- The Avars attack the outskirts of Constantinople. Numerous Slavic tribes rebel against Avar overlordship; they carve out their own sovereign territory in Moravia and Lower Austria (approximate date).

====== Asia ======
- The Meccan boycott of the Hashemites and Muhammad ends.
- November 2 – Tang campaigns against the Western Turks: A khagan of the Western Turkic Khaganate is assassinated in a Chinese palace by Eastern Turkic rivals, with the approval of Emperor Gaozu of Tang.

==== By topic ====
====== Arts and sciences ======
- The calculation of the Chinese calendar begins to use true motions of the sun and moon, modeled using two offset opposing parabolas.
- Construction begins on the earliest known tide mill, Nendrum Monastery mill in the north of Ireland.
- The Chinese begin using large orchestras.

====== Religion ======
- December 23 – Pope Boniface V succeeds Adeodatus I as the 69th pope of Rome.
- Muhammad's wife, Khadija, dies after 24 years of marriage in the Year of Sorrow.
- Kubrat, ruler of the Bulgars, is baptised in Constantinople.
- Mellitus becomes Archbishop of Canterbury.

== Births ==
610

- Anania Shirakatsi, Armenian astronomer (d. 685)
- Barbatus, bishop of Benevento (approximate date)
- Ergica, king of the Visigoths (approximate date)
- Grimoald, King of the Lombards (approximate date)
- Lai Ji, official of the Tang dynasty (d. 662)
- Nanthild, Frankish queen (approximate date)
- Safiyya bint Huyayy, wife of Muhammad (approximate date)

611

- July 7 – Eudoxia Epiphania, daughter of Byzantine emperor Heraclius
- Leo II, Pope of the Catholic Church (d. 683)

612

- May 3 – Constantine III, Byzantine emperor (d. 641)
- Germanus of Granfelden, Frankish abbot (approximate date)
- Oswiu, king of Northumbria (approximate date)

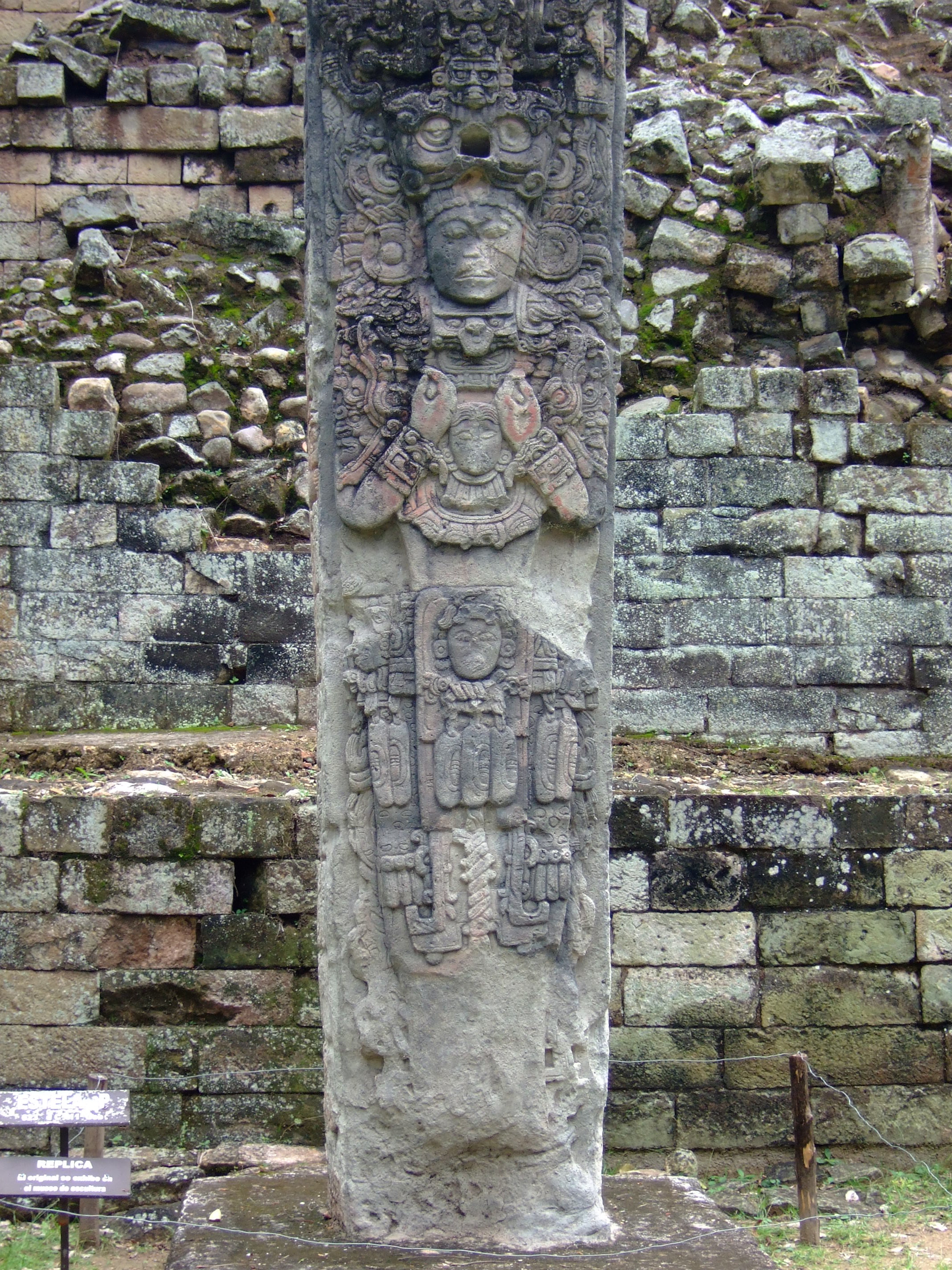
Stela of K'ak' Chan Yopaat

613

- Woncheuk, Korean Buddhist monk (d. 696)
- Aisha, wife of Muhammad (d. 678)

614

- Eanswith, Anglo-Saxon princess (approximate date)
- Fujiwara no Kamatari, founder of the Fujiwara clan (d. 669)
- Hilda of Whitby, abbess and saint (approximate date)
- Li Yifu, chancellor of the Tang dynasty (d. 666)
- Rictrude, Frankish abbess (approximate date)
- General Xue Rengui of the Tang dynasty (d. 683)

615

- Æbbe, Anglo-Saxon princess and abbess (approximate date)
- Begga, Frankish abbess and saint (d. 693)
- Bertin, Frankish abbot (approximate date)
- Buyeo Yung, prince of Baekje (d. 682)
- Fatima, daughter of Muhammad (or 605)
- Leodegar, bishop of Autun (approximate date)
- Li Jingxuan, official of the Tang dynasty (d. 682)

616

- September 28 – Javanshir, king of Caucasian Albania (d. 680)
- Grimoald the Elder, Mayor of the Palace of Austrasia (d. 657)

617

- Songtsän Gampo, emperor of the Tibetan Empire (d. 649)
- Wonhyo, Korean Buddhist monk and writer (d. 686)
- Lady K’awiil Ajaw, queen regnant of the Maya city State of Cobá (d. 682)

618

- Li Tai, prince of the Tang dynasty (d. 652)

619

- Abd Allah ibn Abbas, cousin of Muhammad (d. 687)
- Disibod, Irish monk and hermit (d. 700)
- Li Chengqian, prince of the Tang dynasty (d. 645)
- Li Ke, prince of the Tang dynasty (approximate date)

== Deaths ==
610

- October 5 – Phocas, Byzantine emperor
- Gisulf II, Lombard duke of Friuli (approximate date)
- Heraclius the Elder, Byzantine general
- Tassilo I, King of Bavaria (b. 560)
- Waraka ibn Nawfal, the paternal first cousin of Khadija, the first wife of the Islamic prophet Muhammad.
- Witteric, king of the Visigoths

611

- Arnoald, Bishop of Metz (approximate date)
- Ceolwulf, king of Wessex (approximate date)
- Comentiolus, Byzantine general (approximate date)
- Romilda of Friuli, regent duchess of Friuli (approximate date)

612

- c. February–March – Gundemar, king of the Visigoths
- March 6 – Janaab' Pakal, king of Palenque
- August 13 – Fabia Eudokia, Byzantine empress consort
- Áed Uaridnach, High King of Ireland
- Ajen Yohl Mat, king of Palenque
- Conall Laeg Breg, king of Brega (Ireland)
- Theudebert II, king of Austrasia (b. 586)

613

- April 22 – Saint Theodore of Sykeon, Byzantine ascetic
- Bledric ap Custennin, king of Dumnonia (England)
- Brunhilda, queen of Austrasia
- Priscus, Byzantine general
- Sigebert II, king of Austrasia
- Theuderic II, king of Austrasia
- Uncelen, Duke of Alemannia (Germany)
- Yang Xuangan, official of the Sui dynasty

614

- January 13 – Mungo, Brythonic apostle and saint
- Philippicus, Byzantine general (approximate date)
- Queen Sado

615

- May 25 – Pope Boniface IV
- November 21 – Columbanus, Irish missionary (b. 543)
- Chatzon, chieftain of the Slavs
- John I Lemigius, exarch of Ravenna
- John of Conza, Italian rebel leader
- Máel Coba mac Áedo, High King of Ireland
- Pybba, king of Mercia (approximate date)

616

- February 24 – Æthelberht, king (bretwalda) of Kent
- Æthelfrith, king of Northumbria (approximate date)
- Agilulf, king of the Lombards (approximate date)
- Anastasius, Coptic Patriarch of Alexandria
- Gundoald, Bavarian nobleman
- Iago ap Beli, king of Gwynedd (approximate date)
- John the Merciful, Patriarch of Alexandria
- Liu Jingyan, empress of the Chen dynasty (b. 534)
- Nechtan II, king of the Picts (approximate date)
- Sæbert, king of Essex (approximate date)
- Secundus of Non, Lombard abbot
- Selyf ap Cynan, king of Powys
- Yŏn T'aejo, prime minister of Goguryeo (approximate date)
- Yuan Humo, empress of Northern Zhou
- Yuwen Shu, general of the Sui dynasty

617

- April 17 – Donnán of Eigg, Gaelic priest
- Kakko, duke of Friuli (Italy)
- Sæward, king of Essex (approximate date)
- Sexred, king of Essex (approximate date)
- Tasso, duke of Friuli (Italy)
- Wendelin of Trier, hermit and abbot (approximate date)
- Yang Yichen, general of the Sui dynasty
- Zhai Rang, rebel leader during the Sui dynasty

618

- April 11 – Emperor Yang of Sui, emperor of the Sui dynasty (b. 569)
- September 3 – Xue Ju, emperor of Qin
- November 8 – Pope Adeodatus I
- December 14 – Xue Rengao, emperor of Qin
- Dou Wei, chancellor of the Tang dynasty
- Fíngen mac Áedo Duib, king of Munster (Ireland)
- Kevin of Glendalough, Irish abbot (b. 498)
- Namri Songtsen, king of Tibet (approximate date)
- Shikui Khagan, ruler of the Western Turkic Khaganate
- Yang Gao, prince of the Sui dynasty (b. 607)
- Yang Hao, prince of the Sui dynasty (b. 586)
- Yang Jian, prince of the Sui dynasty (b. 585)
- Yang Xiu, prince of the Sui dynasty
- Yeongyang, king of Goguryeo (Korea)
- Yu Shiji, official of the Chen- and Sui dynasty

619

- February 2 – Laurence, Archbishop of Canterbury
- September 14 – Yang You, emperor of the Sui dynasty (b. 605)
- Abu Talib ibn Abd al-Muttalib, uncle of Muhammad (b. 549)
- Ŭlchi Mundŏk, military leader of Goguryeo (Korea)
- Heshana Khan, ruler of the Western Turkic Khaganate
- John Moschus, Byzantine monk and ascetical writer
- John the Merciful, Patriarch of Alexandria (approximate date)
- Khadija bint Khuwaylid, wife of Muhammad
- Li Gui, emperor of the short-lived state Liang
- Li Mi, rebel leader during the Sui dynasty (b. 582)
- Liu Wenjing, chancellor of the Tang dynasty (b. 568)
- Yang Tong, emperor of the Sui dynasty (b. 605)
- Yuwen Huaji, general of the Sui dynasty
