= 617 =

Calendar year

617 in various calendars
- Gregorian calendar: 617; DCXVII
- Ab urbe condita: 1370
- Armenian calendar: 66; ԹՎ ԿԶ
- Assyrian calendar: 5367
- Balinese saka calendar: 538–539
- Bengali calendar: 23–24
- Berber calendar: 1567
- Buddhist calendar: 1161
- Burmese calendar: −21
- Byzantine calendar: 6125–6126
- Chinese calendar: 丙子年 (Fire Rat); 3314 or 3107 — to — 丁丑年 (Fire Ox); 3315 or 3108
- Coptic calendar: 333–334
- Discordian calendar: 1783
- Ethiopian calendar: 609–610
- Hebrew calendar: 4377–4378
- Hindu calendars
- Vikram Samvat: 673–674
- Shaka Samvat: 538–539
- Kali Yuga: 3717–3718
- Holocene calendar: 10617
- Iranian calendar: 5 BP – 4 BP
- Islamic calendar: 5 BH – 4 BH
- Japanese calendar: N/A
- Javanese calendar: 507–508
- Julian calendar: 617; DCXVII
- Korean calendar: 2950
- Minguo calendar: 1295 before ROC 民前1295年
- Nanakshahi calendar: −851
- Seleucid era: 928/929 AG
- Thai solar calendar: 1159–1160
- Tibetan calendar: མེ་ཕོ་བྱི་བ་ལོ་ (male Fire-Rat); 743 or 362 or −410 — to — མེ་མོ་གླང་ལོ་ (female Fire-Ox); 744 or 363 or −409

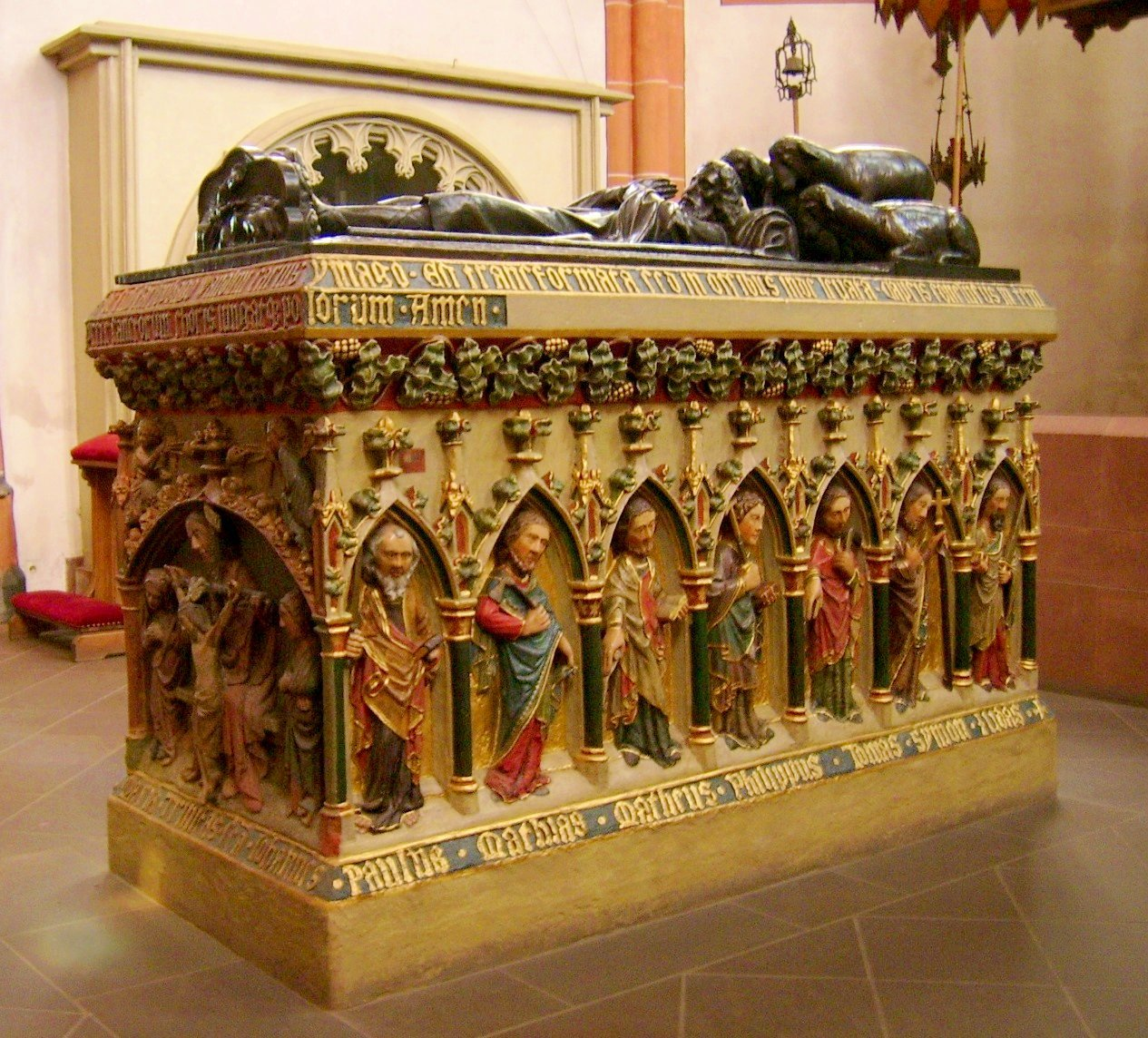
The tomb of Wendelin of Trier (c. 554–617)

Year 617 (DCXVII) was a common year starting on Saturday of the Julian calendar. The denomination 617 for this year has been used since the early medieval period, when the Anno Domini calendar era became the prevalent method in Europe for naming years.

== Events ==
=== By place ===
==== Byzantine Empire ====
- Byzantine-Sassanid War: The Persian army under Shahin Vahmanzadegan conquers Chalcedon in Anatolia, and reaches the Bosporus, threatening Constantinople. Emperor Heraclius begins peace negotiations, promising an annual tribute of 1,000 talents of gold and silver. Shahin withdraws with his army to Syria, to focus on the invasion of Egypt.
- The Avars send envoys to Constantinople for a meeting with Heraclius. He is warned about an ambush, and flees for safety behind the city walls in time. Angry at the failure to capture the Byzantine emperor, the Avars plunder Thrace and return to the Danube River, carrying off 270,000 people.

==== Europe ====
- Grasulf II becomes the Lombard Duke of Friuli (Italy), after the assassination of his nephews, Tasso and Kakko, in Oderzo.

==== Britain ====
- Sigeberht becomes king of Essex, after his father Sæward and uncle Sexred are killed in battle against the West Saxons.
- Heathens revolt in Kent under King Eadbald. During the uprising Justus, bishop of Rochester, flees to Gaul.
- King Edwin of Northumbria invades and annexes the minor British kingdom of Elmet (approximate date).

==== Asia ====
- September 8 – Battle of Huoyi: Rebel forces under Li Yuān defeat the Sui troops near the Fen River, and capture the Chinese capital, Chang'an. Li has gained support from Shibi, ruler (khagan) of the Eastern Turks, who secures his northern frontier and supplies him with 2,000 horses.
- Winter – Li Yuan demotes Sui emperor Yángdi to the status of Taishang Huang (retired emperor), and declares Yang You emperor, while he gives himself authority over the western Sui commanderies (prefecture), under the title of "Prince of Tang".

=== By topic ===
==== Religion ====
- Meccans begin a boycott of the Banu Hashim clan, to which Islamic prophet Muhammad belongs. A civil war begins in Medina.
- Battle of Bu'ath: A pre-Islamic Arabian conflict between the Aws and Khazraj, two major Arabian tribes of Medina.

== Births ==
- Wonhyo, Korean Buddhist monk and writer (d. 686)
- Lady K’awiil Ajaw, queen regnant of the Maya city State of Cobá (d. 682)

== Deaths ==
- April 17 – Donnán of Eigg, Gaelic priest
- Kakko, duke of Friuli (Italy)
- Sæward, king of Essex (approximate date)
- Sexred, king of Essex (approximate date)
- Tasso, duke of Friuli (Italy)
- Wendelin of Trier, hermit and abbot (approximate date)
- Yang Yichen, general of the Sui dynasty
- Zhai Rang, rebel leader during the Sui dynasty
