= 641 =

Calendar year

641 in various calendars
- Gregorian calendar: 641; DCXLI
- Ab urbe condita: 1394
- Armenian calendar: 90; ԹՎ Ղ
- Assyrian calendar: 5391
- Balinese saka calendar: 562–563
- Bengali calendar: 47–48
- Berber calendar: 1591
- Buddhist calendar: 1185
- Burmese calendar: 3
- Byzantine calendar: 6149–6150
- Chinese calendar: 庚子年 (Metal Rat); 3338 or 3131 — to — 辛丑年 (Metal Ox); 3339 or 3132
- Coptic calendar: 357–358
- Discordian calendar: 1807
- Ethiopian calendar: 633–634
- Hebrew calendar: 4401–4402
- Hindu calendars
- Vikram Samvat: 697–698
- Shaka Samvat: 562–563
- Kali Yuga: 3741–3742
- Holocene calendar: 10641
- Iranian calendar: 19–20
- Islamic calendar: 20–21
- Japanese calendar: N/A
- Javanese calendar: 531–532
- Julian calendar: 641; DCXLI
- Korean calendar: 2974
- Minguo calendar: 1271 before ROC 民前1271年
- Nanakshahi calendar: −827
- Seleucid era: 952/953 AG
- Thai solar calendar: 1183–1184
- Tibetan calendar: ལྕགས་ཕོ་བྱི་བ་ལོ་ (male Iron-Rat); 767 or 386 or −386 — to — ལྕགས་མོ་གླང་ལོ་ (female Iron-Ox); 768 or 387 or −385

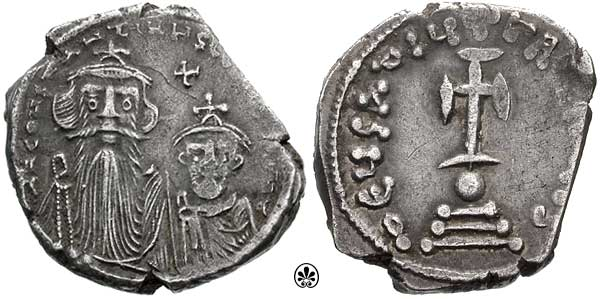
Emperor Constans II (630–668)

Year 641 (DCXLI) was a common year starting on Monday of the Julian calendar. The denomination 641 for this year has been used since the early medieval period, when the Anno Domini calendar era became the prevalent method in Europe for naming years.

== Events ==
=== By place ===
==== Byzantine Empire ====
- February 11 – Emperor Heraclius, age 65, dies of dropsy at Constantinople after a 31-year reign. He reorganized the imperial administration, but lost Armenia, parts of Egypt, Palestine, Syria and Byzantine Mesopotamia to the Muslim Arabs. Heraclius is succeeded by his sons Constantine III and Heraklonas.
- The Muslim conquest of Egypt continues, with the siege of Alexandria.
- May – Constantine III, age 29, dies of tuberculosis after a four-month reign, leaving his half-brother Heraklonas sole emperor. Rumors spread that Constantine has been poisoned by Heraclius's second wife (and niece) Martina.
- September – The Byzantine Senate turns against Martina and her son Heraklonas, who are both mutilated, and exiled to Rhodes. Supported by general Valentinus, Constantine's son Constans II, age 10, succeeds to the throne.
- Constans II establishes a new civil-military defensive organisation, based upon geographical military districts. Byzantine forces maintain the frontier, along the line of the Taurus Mountains (Southern Turkey).

==== Europe ====
- Aega, Mayor of the Palace and regent (alongside of queen mother Nanthild) of Neustria and Burgundy, dies during the reign of King Clovis II. He is replaced by Erchinoald, a relative of Dagobert I's mother.
- The Lombards under King Rothari conquer Genoa (Liguria), and all remaining Byzantine territories in the lower Po Valley, including Oderzo (Opitergium).
- Arechis I, duke of Benevento (northeast of Naples), dies after a 50-year reign and is succeeded by his son Aiulf I.

==== Britain ====
- Prince Oswiu of Bernicia conquers Gododdin (or "The Old North") as far north as Manau (modern Scotland), on behalf of his half-brother, King Oswald (approximate date).
- King Bridei II dies after a 5-year reign, and is succeeded by his brother Talorc III as ruler of the Picts.

==== Africa ====
- November 8 – Siege of Alexandria: Muslim Arabs under 'Amr ibn al-'As capture Alexandria after a six-month siege. Byzantine officials formally capitulate to Amr, turning the city over to Arab hands.
- The city of Fustat (later Cairo) is founded in Egypt. It becomes the first capital of Egypt under Muslim rule.

==== Asia ====
- Emperor Taizong of the Tang dynasty (China) instigates a civil war in the Western Turkic Khaganate, by supporting Isbara Yabghu Qaghan.
- November 17 – Emperor Jomei of Japan, age 48, dies after a 12-year reign.
- Uija becomes the last king of the Korean kingdom of Baekje.

== Births ==
- Asparukh, ruler (khan) of the First Bulgarian Empire (d. 701)

== Deaths ==
- February 11 – Heraclius, Byzantine emperor
- November 17 – Emperor Jomei of Japan (b. 593)
- Aega, Mayor of the Palace (Neustria and Burgundy)
- Arechis I, duke of Benevento (Italy)
- Bridei II, king of the Picts
- Emperor Constantine III of the Byzantine Empire
- Mu, king of Baekje (one of the Three Kingdoms of Korea)
- Ouyang Xun, Confucian scholar and calligrapher (b. 557)
- Zaynab bint Jahsh, wife of Muhammad
