= Irbis =

Irbis may refer to:

- Russian for snow leopard
- Irbis-E a Russian aircraft radar
- Irbis (Khazar), 7th-century Khazar ruler
- Irbis Seguy, 7th-century Turkic ruler
- the Kazakh airline Irbis Air
- Irbis Kazan, a junior fellow affiliate ice-hockey team of Ak Bars Kazan
