= Irbis Ishbara Yabgu Qaghan =

Qaghan of the Western Turkic Khaganate (Nushibi faction)
- Reign: 640–641
- Predecessor: El Külüg Shad Irbis Qaghan
- Successor: Irbis Seguy Qaghan
- Died: 641
Names
- Ashina Bobu (阿史那薄布)
Regnal name
- Irbis Ishbara Yabgu Qaghan (乙毗沙鉢羅葉護可汗)
- House: Ashina
- Dynasty: Western Turkic Khaganate
- Father: Kana Shad (伽那設)
- Religion: Tengrism

Irbis Ishbara Yabgu Qaghan (Chinese: 乙毗沙鉢羅葉護可汗), personal name Ashina Bobu (阿史那薄布), was a qaghan of the Nushibi faction of the Western Turkic Khaganate.

== Name ==
He had multiple names recorded in Chinese annals. His personal name is not recorded, however, several modern works refer to him as Ashina Bobu (阿史那薄布). The Old Book of Tang refers to him as Bopu Tegin (Chinese: 薄布特勒, romanized: Bóbù Tèlēi). Xue Zhongzheng reconstructed his Turkic name as *Basliq (leader). Another name recorded for him in the New Book of Tang was Baghatur Yabgu (Chinese: 畢賀咄葉護, romanized: Bìhèduō Yèhù). His full regnal name was Yipi Shabolue Yehu Qaghan (Chinese: 乙毗沙钵罗叶护可汗, romanized: Yǐpí Shābōluó Yèhù Kèhán). Lev Gumilev reconstructed his regnal name as Irbis Ishbara Yabgu Qaghan.

== Biography ==
Irbis Ishbara Yabgu Qaghan's father was Kana Shad (Chinese: 伽那设, romanized: Jiānà Shè), who was described as a brother of Ishbara Tolis Qaghan. Josef Markwart identified his father with Kana (from the Bukhar Khudahs), who is said to have introduced the minting of coins in Bukhara. He was acknowledged as qaghan by Emperor Taizong of Tang following the death of his cousin, El Kulug Shad. Choosing Suyab as his capital, he sent governors to the Tarim Basin, Tashkent, Samarkand and Bactria to assert his rule. However, he was killed by the tudun of Tashkent on the orders of Yukuk Shad in 641. Yukuk absorbed his realm while the Nushibi faction promoted another cousin as qaghan after him.
