= Tolis =

Tolis is a surname. Notable people with the surname include:

- Ishbara Tolis, ruler of Western Turkic Khaganate
- Sakis Tolis (born 1972), Greek musician
- Themis Tolis (born 1974), Greek musician
