= 619 =

Calendar year

619 in various calendars
Gregorian calendar	619; DCXIX
Ab urbe condita	1372
Armenian calendar	68; ԹՎ ԿԸ
Assyrian calendar	5369
Balinese saka calendar	540–541
Bengali calendar	25–26
Berber calendar	1569
Buddhist calendar	1163
Burmese calendar	−19
Byzantine calendar	6127–6128
Chinese calendar	戊寅年 (Earth Tiger); 3316 or 3109 — to — 己卯年 (Earth Rabbit); 3317 or 3110
Coptic calendar	335–336
Discordian calendar	1785
Ethiopian calendar	611–612
Hebrew calendar	4379–4380
- Hindu calendars
Vikram Samvat	675–676
Shaka Samvat	540–541
Kali Yuga	3719–3720
Holocene calendar	10619
Iranian calendar	3 BP – 2 BP
Islamic calendar	3 BH – 2 BH
Japanese calendar	N/A
Javanese calendar	509–510
Julian calendar	619; DCXIX
Korean calendar	2952
Minguo calendar	1293 before ROC 民前1293年
Nanakshahi calendar	−849
Seleucid era	930/931 AG
Thai solar calendar	1161–1162
Tibetan calendar	ས་ཕོ་སྟག་ལོ་ (male Earth-Tiger); 745 or 364 or −408 — to — ས་མོ་ཡོས་ལོ་ (female Earth-Hare); 746 or 365 or −407

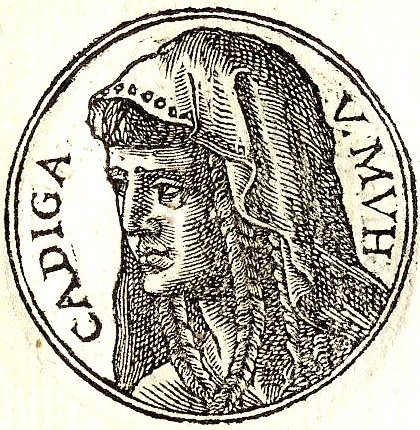
Khadija, wife of Muhammad (c. 555–619)

Year 619 (DCXIX) was a common year starting on Monday of the Julian calendar. The denomination 619 for this year has been used since the early medieval period, when the Anno Domini calendar era became the prevalent method in Europe for naming years.

== Events ==
=== By place ===
==== Byzantine Empire ====
- Byzantine–Sasanian War: The besieged city of Alexandria is captured by the Persians. Nicetas, cousin of Emperor Heraclius, and Chalcedonian patriarch, John V, flee to Cyprus. King Khosrow II extends his rule southwards along the Nile.
- Heraclius prepares to leave Constantinople and moves the Byzantine capital to Carthage, but is convinced to stay by Sergius I, patriarch of Constantinople. He begins to rebuild the Byzantine army with the aid of funds from church treasures.
- The Avars attack the outskirts of Constantinople. Numerous Slavic tribes rebel against Avar overlordship; they carve out their own sovereign territory in Moravia and Lower Austria (approximate date).

==== Asia ====
- The Meccan boycott of the Hashemites and Muhammad ends.
- November 2 – Tang campaigns against the Western Turks: A khagan of the Western Turkic Khaganate is assassinated in a Chinese palace by Eastern Turkic rivals, with the approval of Emperor Gaozu of Tang.

=== By topic ===
==== Arts and sciences ====
- The calculation of the Chinese calendar begins to use true motions of the sun and moon, modeled using two offset opposing parabolas.
- Construction begins on the earliest known tide mill, Nendrum Monastery mill in the north of Ireland.
- The Chinese begin using large orchestras.

==== Religion ====
- December 23 – Pope Boniface V succeeds Adeodatus I as the 69th pope of Rome.
- Muhammad's wife, Khadija, dies after 24 years of marriage in the Year of Sorrow.
- Kubrat, ruler of the Bulgars, is baptised in Constantinople.
- Mellitus becomes Archbishop of Canterbury.

== Births ==
- Abd Allah ibn Abbas, cousin of Muhammad (d. 687)
- Disibod, Irish monk and hermit (d. 700)
- Li Chengqian, prince of the Tang dynasty (d. 645)
- Li Ke, prince of the Tang dynasty (approximate date)

== Deaths ==
- February 2 – Laurence, Archbishop of Canterbury
- September 14 – Yang You, emperor of the Sui dynasty (b. 605)
- Abu Talib ibn Abd al-Muttalib, uncle of Muhammad (b. 549)
- Ŭlchi Mundŏk, military leader of Goguryeo (Korea) (approximate date)
- Heshana Khan, ruler of the Western Turkic Khaganate
- John Moschus, Byzantine monk and ascetical writer
- Khadija bint Khuwaylid, wife of Muhammad
- Li Gui, emperor of the short-lived state Liang
- Li Mi, rebel leader during the Sui dynasty (b. 582)
- Liu Wenjing, chancellor of the Tang dynasty (b. 568)
- Yang Tong, emperor of the Sui dynasty (b. 605)
- Yuwen Huaji, general of the Sui dynasty
