= Ashina Helu =

Last Western Turkic khagan (r. 651–658)

Ishbara Qaghan

Qaghan of the Western Turkic Khaganate
- Reign: 651–658
- Predecessor: Irbis Seguy Qaghan
- Successor: Ashina Buzhen (under Jimi system); Ashina Mishe (under Jimi system)
- Died: 659; Chang'an, Tang dynasty
- Issue: Ashina Xiyun
Names
- Ashina Helu (阿史那賀魯)
Regnal name
- Ishbara Qaghan (沙缽略可汗 or 沙鉢略可汗)
- House: Ashina
- Dynasty: Western Turkic Khaganate
- Father: Böri Shad or Irbis Seguy Qaghan
- Religion: Tengrism

Ishbara Qaghan (Old Turkic: 𐰃𐱁𐰉𐰺𐰀𐰴𐰍𐰣, Ïšbara qaγan; Chinese: 沙缽略可汗 or 沙鉢略可汗; pinyin: Shābōlüè Kèhán), personal name Ashina Helu (Chinese: 阿史那賀魯; pinyin: Āshǐnà Hèlǔ), was the last independent qaghan of the Western Turkic Khaganate, before its conquest by the Tang dynasty.

== Name ==
His underlying Turkic name, transcribed with Chinese characters 賀魯, was debated among scholars. Gumilyov proposed Hallïğ, meaning "Elevated". Von Gabain proposed name Kullïğ (slave owner). Gömeç argued for Uluğ meaning "Great". Meanwhile, Kapusuzoğlu proposed Kutluğ (Blessed) as his underlying Turkic name. Zuev (1960) linked the Khagan personal name Helu (< MC *ɣa-lou) with the tribal name Khallukh attested by Persian and Arab writers, and asserted that by the 7th century Helu's tribe was dynastic; later, however, Zuev (2002) proposed that Chinese Helu reflects Turkic *aru ~ arïğ "pure, light".

== Biography ==
=== Early years ===
Ashina Helu's parentage is uncertain. According to Gumilov his father was Böri Shad, however Chavannes attributes him as a son of Irbis Seguy. He was awarded with the title shad by Duolu Qaghan in 633 and appointed to govern certain tribes including the Chuye, Qarluq, Nushibi. In 646 he rose against Irbis Seguy only to be defeated by him. He fled to the Tang dynasty on 25 April 648 and served the Tang military as a general stationed in Mohe (莫賀) city in Gansu.

However he planned to assert independence using Taizong's death in 649. Qiao Baoming (橋寶明) personal staff of Gaozong tried to avert it by ordering him to deliver his son Ashina Xiyun (阿史那咥運) to serve in the palace guard. Xiyun served for a while before returning to Helu again and encouraging him to attack Irbis Dulu Qaghan.

=== Reign ===
After a while he set up his horde near modern Shuanghe and began to receive submissions. According to the Zizhi Tongjian firstly the Duolu tribe chiefs who were titled as čor, namely Chomuqun chief Kuli (處木昆(屈)律啜), Ulugh Oq chief Kul (胡祿居闕啜), Chapshata chief Ton (摄舍提暾啜), Türgesh-Halach chief (突騎施賀邏施啜), Shungish chief Chuban (鼠尼施處半啜) submitted. Ulugh Oq chief was also a son-in-law to Helu. Nushibi tribal chiefs who were titled irkin also submitted; Esegel chief Kül (阿悉結闕俟斤), Geshu chief Kül (哥舒闕俟斤), Basaigan chief Tong Ishbara (拔塞幹暾沙鉢俟斤), Esegel chief Nishu (阿悉結泥孰俟斤), Geshu chief Chuban (哥舒處半俟斤). Ashina Xiyun was appointed crown prince with the title Bagatur Yabgu.

After formally reasserting independence from the Tang, he commanded raids to Jin Ling (金嶺城, near modern Shanshan, Xinjiang) and Pulei (蒲類縣). Emperor Gaozong stripped him of Chinese titles and ordered Qibi Heli and Liang Jianfang (梁建方) to secure border areas.

Conflicts also began in southern border when Zhenzhu Yabgu (son of Irbis Dulu Qaghan) started major incursions to Western Turkic territory. Later Zhenzhu contacted the Tang to receive soldiers and requested to be made a khagan in 655. Yuan Lichen (元礼臣) was ordered by Gaozong to visit Zhenzhu on 8 November 656 to make him khagan, but he was stopped by Helu's soldiers near Suyab, causing Zhenzhu to lose much prestige.

In 657 Emperor Gaozong started the Conquest of the Western Turks. General Su Dingfang was appointed to be leading commander during whole operation. The Chumukun tribe was first to lose whose chief Lantulu (懶獨祿) submitted. The Tang army defeated Ashina Helu at the Battle of Irtysh River. However he fled to Chach with his son Ashina Xiyun and a noble retainer Xuyan. However he was soon handed over to Xiao Siya (萧嗣业) by Chach ruler Yixian Tarkhan.

=== Later years ===
After being captured he reportedly told Xiao Siya:

I am a defeated slave. Former emperor (Taizong) supported me and awarded richly. Alas, I turned my back on him and rebelled. My defeat today is result of Heaven's anger and punishment. What could I say! I heard according to Han customs, criminals are executed in capital. My wish is to die in Zhaoling and ask forgiveness from former emperor.

Emperor Gaozong spared him after 15 days and he lived out his days at the Tang capital Chang'an. He was buried near Illig Qaghan's memorial.

== See also ==
- Tang campaigns against the Western Turks

== Sources ==
- Christoph Baumer, History of Central Asia, volume two, 2014, index

Ashina Helu Ashina Clan
Preceded by Irbis Seguy	Khagan of the Western Turkic Khaganate; 651–658	Succeeded by (end of the khaganate)
