= El Külüg Shad =

7th-century Qaghan

El Külüg Shad Irbis Qaghan

Qaghan of the Western Turkic Khaganate (Nushibi faction)
- Reign: 639–640
- Predecessor: Ishbara Tolis Qaghan
- Successor: Irbis Ishbara Yabgu Qaghan
- Died: 640
- Issue: Irbis Seguy Qaghan
Names
- Unknown
Regnal name
- El Külüg Shad Irbis Qaghan (乙屈利失乙毗可汗) or Baghatur Irbis Qaghan (莫賀咄乙毗可汗)
- House: Ashina
- Dynasty: Western Turkic Khaganate
- Father: Ishbara Tolis Qaghan
- Religion: Tengrism

El Külüg Shad Irbis Qaghan (Chinese: 乙屈利失乙毗可汗), personal name unknown, was a qaghan of the Western Turkic Khaganate. His regnal name is recorded as Baghatur Irbis Qaghan (莫賀咄乙毗可汗) in the Old Book of Tang.

== Name ==
While his personal name isn't known, his regnal title was Yiqulishi Yipi Qaghan (Chinese: 乙屈利失乙毘可汗, romanized: Yǐqūlìshī Yǐpí Kĕhàn). Gumilev tried to reconstruct this name as El Kulug Shad Irbis Qaghan. Whilst, the Old Book of Tang refers to him as Moheduo Yipi Khagan (Chinese: 莫賀咄乙毘可汗, romanized: Mòhèduō Yǐpí Kèhán). The first part of this name is often reconstructed as *Baghatur in Turkic, the nature of the second component is debated. According to Zuev, Yipi was a Chinese rendition of Yelbi (sorcerer), which was a sign of rulers bearing this name being "shaman-kings". According to Marcel Erdal, however, *yelbi was a proto-Turkic term for "sorcery", not a "sorcerer". Another proposed transliteration of his name is Irbis (snow leopard), a name attested many times among Western Turkic regnal names. Minoru Inaba likened this epithet to Nishu, another often shared name among Western Turkic khans.

== Biography ==
El Kulug Shad was a son of Ishbara Tolis Qaghan. In 639, a tudun ilteber under his father secretly colluded with Yukuk Shad and rebelled, so Ishbara Tolis fled to Bahana (抜汗那; modern Fergana) where he died. The Nushibi tribes then set up El Kulug Shad as the new khagan but he died in 640. Thereupon, the chieftain of the Nushibi welcomed his cousin Bopu Tegin (薄布特勤) as the new khagan. He had a son who would later succeed as khagan under the title Irbis Seguy.
