= Tasso of Friuli =

Tasso (or Taso) (died 617) was the joint Duke of Friuli with his younger brother Kakko from their father's death (611) to their own. Their father was Gisulf II and their mother Romilda of Friuli. In or around 611, Gisulf was killed fending off an Avar invasion.

Tasso, along with his brothers Kakko, Radoald, and Grimoald, escaped the Avars and evaded capture, successfully setting themselves up as Gisulf's successors. During their reign, they ruled over the Slavs of the valley of the Gail up to Matrei and imposed a tribute upon them.

According to Paul the Deacon (Historia Langobardorum IV.38), Tasso and Kakko were treacherously killed by "Gregorius patricius Romanorum". The exarch, having invited Tasso to Oderzo for a ceremonial beard-cutting, had him hunted down and killed along with Kakko. Radoald and Grimoald fled to Arechis I of Benevento and Friuli passed to their uncle Grasulf II.

== Sources ==
- Paul the Deacon (1907). History of the Lombards. Translated by Foulke, William Dudley. Philadelphia: University of Pennsylvania.

Preceded by Gisulf II	Duke of Friuli c. 611 – c. 617 with Kakko (c. 611 – c. 617)	Succeeded by Grasulf II
