= Zhenzhu Yabgu =

Claimant of the Western Turkic Khaganate
- Reign: 653–659
- Predecessor: Yukuk Shad
- Died: 659; Shuanghe
- House: Ashina
- Father: Yukuk Shad
- Religion: Tengrism

Zhenzhu Yabgu (Chinese: 珍珠葉護) was a claimant to throne of the Western Turkic Khaganate.

== Biography ==
Zhenzhu Yabgu was Yukuk Shad's son and Illig Qaghan's grandson. He was known as El Bi Tardu Shad (Chinese: 颉苾达度设; pinyin: Jiébìdádùshè) during his father's reign.

In 653, he succeeded his father in Kunduz. Starting from then, he claimed to be ruler of Western Turkic Khaganate in opposition to Ashina Helu. Later Zhenzhu contacted the Tang to receive soldiers and requested to be made a qaghan in 655. Yuan Lichen (元礼臣) was ordered by Emperor Gaozong of Tang to visit Zhenzhu on 8 November 656 to make him qaghan, but he was stopped by Helu's soldiers near Suyab, causing Zhenzhu to lose much prestige.

His territory was also invaded during the Chinese conquest of the Western Turks and was killed by Ashina Mishe near Shuanghe in March, 659.
