= Zotto =

Duke of Benevento

Zotto (also Zotton or Zottone) was the military leader (Latin: dux) of the Lombards in Southern Italy. He is generally considered the founder of the Duchy of Benevento in 571 and its first duke: “…Fuit autem primus Langobardorum dux in Benevento nomine Zotto, qui in ea principatus est per curricula viginti annorum…”.

With his troops, he penetrated Campania in August 570, confronting the Byzantines, whom he defeated consistently. He fixed his camp in Benevento, which became the capital of the new duchy. He tried to take Naples, but failed and had to lift the siege (581). During his reign, raiders under his command sacked the towns of Atina and Aquino and the monastery of Monte Cassino.

As a duke he was quasi-independent, the north of the peninsula being under the control of the Lombard king Authari, who had little influence in the south. He finally submitted to royal authority in 589.

He died in 591 and was succeeded by Arechis.

Regnal titles
New title	Duke of Benevento; 571–591	Succeeded by Arechis I
