= 682 =

Calendar year

682 in various calendars
- Gregorian calendar: 682; DCLXXXII
- Ab urbe condita: 1435
- Armenian calendar: 131; ԹՎ ՃԼԱ
- Assyrian calendar: 5432
- Balinese saka calendar: 603–604
- Bengali calendar: 88–89
- Berber calendar: 1632
- Buddhist calendar: 1226
- Burmese calendar: 44
- Byzantine calendar: 6190–6191
- Chinese calendar: 辛巳年 (Metal Snake); 3379 or 3172 — to — 壬午年 (Water Horse); 3380 or 3173
- Coptic calendar: 398–399
- Discordian calendar: 1848
- Ethiopian calendar: 674–675
- Hebrew calendar: 4442–4443
- Hindu calendars
- Vikram Samvat: 738–739
- Shaka Samvat: 603–604
- Kali Yuga: 3782–3783
- Holocene calendar: 10682
- Iranian calendar: 60–61
- Islamic calendar: 62–63
- Japanese calendar: Hakuchi 33 (白雉３３年)
- Javanese calendar: 574–575
- Julian calendar: 682; DCLXXXII
- Korean calendar: 3015
- Minguo calendar: 1230 before ROC 民前1230年
- Nanakshahi calendar: −786
- Seleucid era: 993/994 AG
- Thai solar calendar: 1224–1225
- Tibetan calendar: ལྕགས་མོ་སྦྲུལ་ལོ་ (female Iron-Snake); 808 or 427 or −345 — to — ཆུ་ཕོ་རྟ་ལོ་ (male Water-Horse); 809 or 428 or −344

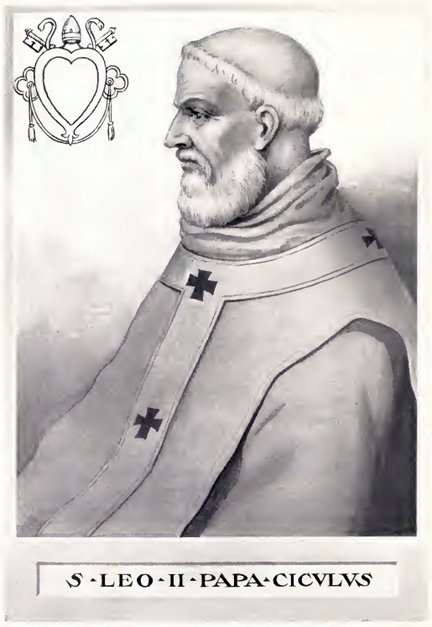
Pope Leo II (682–683)

Year 682 (DCLXXXII) was a common year starting on Wednesday of the Julian calendar. The denomination 682 for this year has been used since the early medieval period, when the Anno Domini calendar era became the prevalent method in Europe for naming years.

== Events ==
=== By place ===
==== Europe ====
- King Erwig of the Visigoths continues oppression of the Jews in Spain. He makes it illegal to practice any Jewish rites (brit milah), and presses for the conversion or emigration of the remaining Jews.
- Gistemar becomes mayor of the palace in Neustria and Burgundy, after he deposes his father Waratto. He reverses the peace treaty with Austrasia, signed with Pepin of Herstal at Namur.
- King Ecgfrith requests Benedict Biscop to build a second monastery at Jarrow (Northumbria). Benedict leaves Monkwearmouth with 20 monks, (including his protégé, the young Bede).
- The West Saxons, led by King Centwine, drive the Britons of Dumnonia (West Country) to the sea (possibly around Bideford).
- The wandering ex-Wessex sub-king, Cædwalla, seeks St. Wilfrid as his spiritual father, but does not convert to Christianity.
- Bridei III, King of the Picts, campaigns violently against Orkney.

==== Africa ====
- At about this time, Muslim Umayyad Caliphate forces led by Uqba ibn Nafi overrun the south coast of the Mediterranean Sea. He occupies the cities of Tripoli and Carthage, the last Byzantine bases in Africa. In 682 or 683 the Umayyads are ambushed at the Battle of Vescera near Biskra (modern Algeria) by Romano-Berbers of King Caecilius and their Byzantine allies from the Exarchate of Carthage. Uqba ibn Nafi is killed and his army evacuates the city of Kairouan in Tunisia and withdraws to Barca.

==== Asia ====
- Due to a culmination of major droughts, floods, locust plagues and epidemics, a widespread famine breaks out in the dual Chinese capital cities of Chang'an (primary capital) and Luoyang (secondary capital). The scarcity of food drives the price of grain to unprecedented heights, ending a once prosperous era under emperors Taizong and Gaozong on a sad note.
- Emperor Tenmu issues a decree forbidding the Japanese-style cap of ranks and garments, and changing them into Chinese ones. He also makes a decree forbidding men to wear leggings and women to let down their hair on their backs. It is from this time, that the practice begins of women riding on horseback like men. He issues an edict prescribing the character of ceremonies and language to be used on occasions of ceremony. Ceremonial kneeling and crawling are both abolished, and the ceremonial custom of standing at the Tang court is practiced.

==== Mesoamerica ====
- Jasaw Chan Kʼawiil I starts to rule in Tikal (modern Guatemala) during the Late Classic period.
- Bʼalaj Chan Kʼawiil begins a program to inscribe monuments recording his travails and ultimate victory, during the Second Tikal–Calakmul War.

=== By topic ===
==== Astronomy ====
- January 3 – Venus occults Jupiter.

==== Literature ====
- The first entry is made in the Welsh chronicle Brut y Tywysogion.

==== Religion ====
- August 17 – Pope Leo II succeeds Agatho as the 80th pope, after a period of sede vacante ("vacant seat") of a year and 7 months.

== Births ==
- July 20 – Taichō, Japanese Buddhist monk (d. 767)
- Li Chongrun, prince of the Tang dynasty (d. 701)

== Deaths ==
- Barbatus, bishop of Benevento
- Bilal ibn al-Harith, companion of Muhammad (approximate date)
- Zaynab bint Ali, sister of Husayn ibn Ali (b. 626)
- Bojang, king of Goguryeo (Korea)
- Buyeo Yung, prince of Baekje (in exile in Luoyang)
- Cadwaladr, king of Gwynedd (Wales)
- Cenn Fáelad mac Colgan, king of Connacht (Ireland)
- Li Jingxuan, chancellor of the Tang dynasty (b. 615)
- Maslama ibn Mukhallad, companion of Muhammad
- Sun Simiao, Chinese medicine doctor
- Lady Kʼawiil Ajaw, queen regnant of the Maya city-state of Cobá (b. 617)
