= Ago of Friuli =

Duke of Friuli

Ago was the Duke of Friuli from between 651 and 661 until about 663 (some sources put it as early as 660). He succeeded Grasulf II.

According to Paul the Deacon, there was a house in Cividale named "Ago's House" after this duke. Ago died and was succeeded by Lupus.

Preceded by Grasulf II	Duke of Friuli; 651–663	Succeeded by Lupus
