= Grasulf II of Friuli =

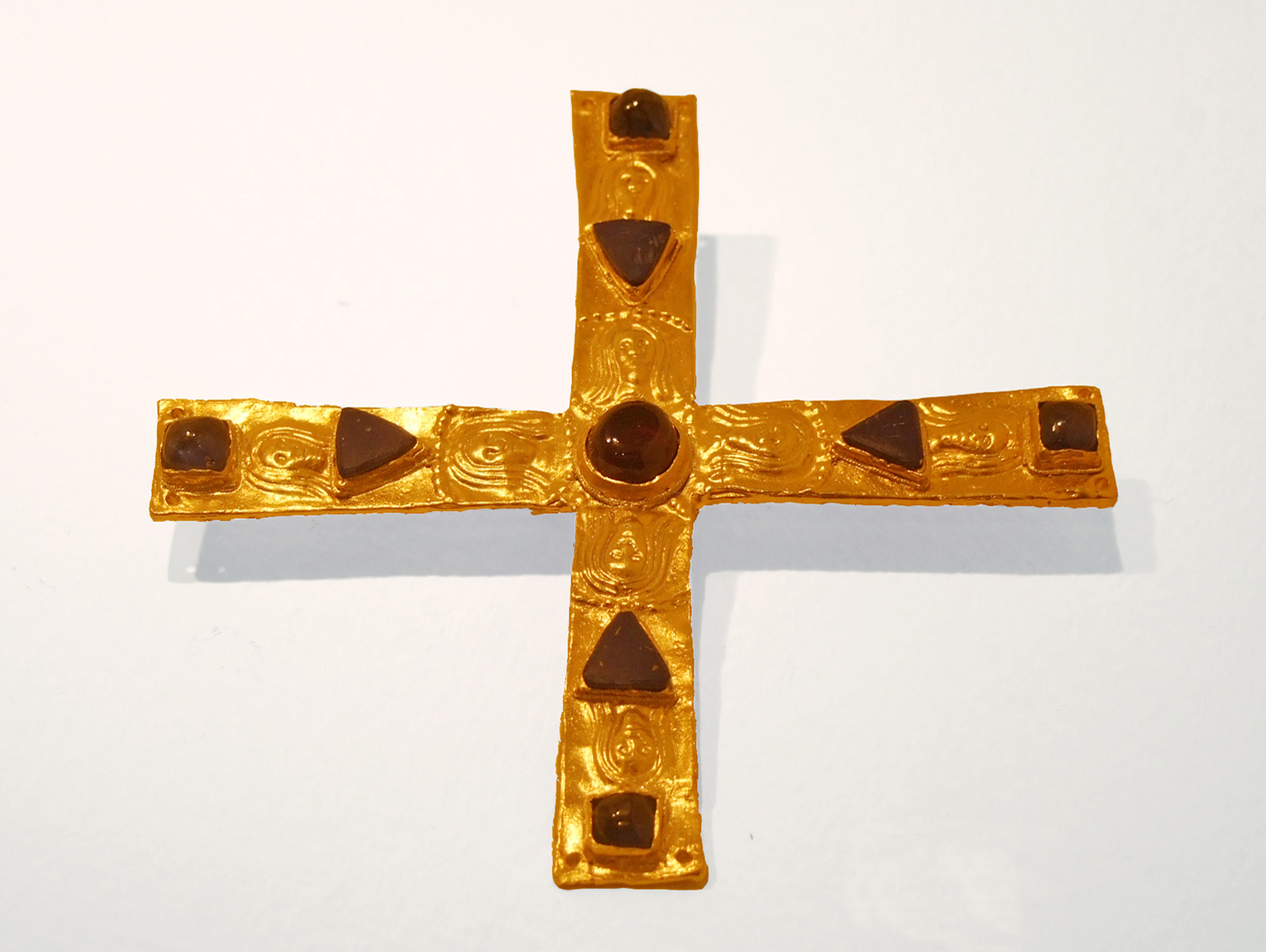
Cross from the Grave of Duke Gisulf; cemetery of Cella

Grasulf II, son of Duke Gisulf I, was the Duke of Friuli after the assassination of his nephews, Tasso and Kakko, in Oderzo in 616 or 617. His other nephews, Radoald and Grimoald, left Friuli for the Duchy of Benevento because they did not wish to live under Grasulf. Nothing more is known about Grasulf and the date of his death is uncertain. He died at Cividale.

== Sources ==
- Paul the Deacon. Historia Langobardorum. Available at Northvegr.

Preceded by Tasso	Duke of Friuli c. 617 – c. 651	Succeeded by Ago
