= Romilda of Friuli =

Duchess Consort of Friuli

Romilda or Ramhilde (died 611), was a Duchess consort of Friuli by marriage to Duke Gisulf II of Friuli. She served as regent of Friuli in 611, during the invasion of the Pannonian Avars.

Romilda was reportedly the daughter of Garibald I of Bavaria. She married Gisulf II of Friuli, and became the mother of the sons Tasso, Kakko, Radoald and Grimoald, and the daughters Appa and Geila (or Gaila), married to the King of the Alemanni (uncertain) and the Prince of the Bavarians, probably Garibald II of Bavaria.

In 611, the Duchy of Friuli was invaded by the Pannonian Avars under their king Bayan II, who is referred to as "Cacan" in the traditional story of Romilda. Gisulf II died on the battlefield, and the Avars besieged the main capital Friuli, which was defended by Romilda, who had taken command as regent. Romilda famously offered the Avarian king Bayan II to surrender the city peacefully, if he accepted her peace offering by a marriage between them. Bayan II accepted the offer, and the siege was lifted. However, when Romilda surrendered the city, Friuli was pillaged by Bayan II, who broke his word. He reportedly spent one night with Romilda and raped her, after which he allowed her to be raped by his soldiers. After this, he is claimed to have had her executed by impalement. Her children managed to escape.

Romilda has been given a very bad reputation in history because of Paul the Deacon, who in his chronicle from the following century claimed, that she made the offer of marriage to Bayan II out of personal attraction, and betrayed her city out of sexual lust. However, to make peace through a proposal of a marriage alliance was in fact a common and accepted political peace method of the time, when dipolomatic marriages were common royal norm.
