= 605 =

Calendar year

605 in various calendars
- Gregorian calendar: 605; DCV
- Ab urbe condita: 1358
- Armenian calendar: 54; ԹՎ ԾԴ
- Assyrian calendar: 5355
- Balinese saka calendar: 526–527
- Bengali calendar: 11–12
- Berber calendar: 1555
- Buddhist calendar: 1149
- Burmese calendar: −33
- Byzantine calendar: 6113–6114
- Chinese calendar: 甲子年 (Wood Rat); 3302 or 3095 — to — 乙丑年 (Wood Ox); 3303 or 3096
- Coptic calendar: 321–322
- Discordian calendar: 1771
- Ethiopian calendar: 597–598
- Hebrew calendar: 4365–4366
- Hindu calendars
- Vikram Samvat: 661–662
- Shaka Samvat: 526–527
- Kali Yuga: 3705–3706
- Holocene calendar: 10605
- Iranian calendar: 17 BP – 16 BP
- Islamic calendar: 18 BH – 17 BH
- Japanese calendar: N/A
- Javanese calendar: 494–495
- Julian calendar: 605; DCV
- Korean calendar: 2938
- Minguo calendar: 1307 before ROC 民前1307年
- Nanakshahi calendar: −863
- Seleucid era: 916/917 AG
- Thai solar calendar: 1147–1148
- Tibetan calendar: ཤིང་ཕོ་བྱི་བ་ལོ་ (male Wood-Rat); 731 or 350 or −422 — to — ཤིང་མོ་གླང་ལོ་ (female Wood-Ox); 732 or 351 or −421

Year 605 (DCV) was a common year starting on Friday of the Julian calendar. The denomination 605 for this year has been used since the early medieval period, when the Anno Domini calendar era became the prevalent method in Europe for naming years.

== Events ==
=== By place ===
==== Byzantine Empire ====
- Emperor Phocas recognizes Agilulf as king of the Lombards, and signs a peace treaty. He pays a tribute and cedes Orvieto (Central Italy), among other towns. The Byzantine army is withdrawn from the Balkan Peninsula.
- Phocas has Constantina, empress consort of Maurice, and her three daughters arrested. He accuses her of conspiracy, and has them executed at Chalcedon (Bithynia).

==== Britain ====
- King Æthelfrith annexes the neighboring kingdom of Deira (Northern England). The region between the Forth and Humber rivers will hereafter be known as Northumbria, the most powerful of the Anglo-Saxon kingdoms.

==== Persia ====
- As a result of a quarrel between the Lakhmid kingdom (Southern Iraq) and King Khosrau II, the Persian frontier with Arabia is no longer guarded (approximate date).

==== Asia ====
- Emperor Yángdi orders the capital to be transferred from Chang'an to Luoyang. He begins the construction of the Grand Canal, that will link existing waterways to the new Chinese capital; it will be built by a million laborers.
- Yángdi introduces an imperial examination, designed to select the best administrative officials (after they receive the jinshi) for the state; this begins a long bureaucratic tradition of scholar-officialdom in China.
- The Zhaozhou Bridge is completed under the Sui dynasty, the earliest known fully stone open-spandrel segmental arch bridge in the world (although the earlier Roman Trajan's Bridge featured segmental arches).
- Amshuvarma becomes king of the Licchavi in Nepal. He is credited for opening trade routes to Tibet. His ruling period is known as the "Golden Period".

==== Mesoamerica ====
- Aj Ne' Yohl Mat becomes ruler (ajaw) of the Maya city of Palenque (Mexico). During his reign his kingdom is invaded by people from Calakmul.

== Births ==
- Chlodulf, bishop of Metz
- Colmán, bishop of Lindisfarne (approximate date)
- Fatimah, daughter of Muhammad (or 615)
- Yang You, puppet emperor of the Sui dynasty (d. 619)
- Sisenand, king of the Visigoths (approximate date)
- Songtsän Gampo, emperor of the Tibetan Empire (d. 649)
- Yang Tong, puppet emperor of the Sui dynasty (d. 619)

== Deaths ==
- Alexander of Tralles, physician (approximate date)
- Brandub mac Echach, king of Uí Ceinnselaig (Ireland)
- Constantina, Byzantine empress (approximate date)
- Damian, Coptic Orthodox Patriarch of Alexandria
