= Gisulf II of Friuli =

Duke of Friuli

Gisulf II (Gisulfo II di Friuli; abt. 545 – 611) was the Duke of Friuli from around 591 to his death. He was the son and successor of Grasulf I of Friuli.

Gisulf and Gaidoald of Trent were at odds with King Agilulf until they made peace in 602 or 603. Gisulf also allied with the Avars to make war on Istria.

Gisulf was involved in the local church. The bishops of "the schismatics of Istria and Venetia," as Paul the Deacon calls them, fled to the protection of Gisulf. Gisulf also took part in the confirmation of the succession of Candidianus to the patriarchate of Aquileia in 606.

The most significant event of his reign occurred probably in 611. When the Avars invaded Italy, Gisulf's territory was the first they passed through. Gisulf summoned a large army and went to meet them. The Avars were a larger force, however, and they soon overwhelmed the Lombards. Gisulf died in battle, and his duchy was overrun. He left four sons and four daughters by his wife Romilda (or Ramhilde). His elder two sons, Tasso and Kakko, succeeded him.

Gisulf's younger sons, Radoald and Grimoald, fled to Arechis I of Benevento, a relative of Gisulf's. They both eventually became dukes of Benevento in turn, and Grimoald even became king. Gisulf left two daughters, Appa and Geila (or Gaila). Paul the Deacon says that one married the King of the Alemanni (uncertain) and another the Prince of the Bavarians, probably Garibald II of Bavaria, but he does not identify who married whom.

== Sources ==
- Paul the Deacon. Historia Langobardorum. Available at Northvegr.

Preceded by Gisulf I	Duke of Friuli c. 591 – c. 611	Succeeded by Tasso
Preceded by Gisulf I	Duke of Friuli c. 591 – c. 611	Succeeded by Kakko
