= Aiulf I of Benevento =

Aiulf I (also Aione) was the duke of Benevento from 641 to his death in 642 as the son and successor of Arechis I. However, he was mentally unstable and his adoptive brothers Radoald and Grimoald were regents for him. Aiulf had reigned for a year and five months, when in 642, Slavic plunderers landed near Siponto on the Adriatic. Aiulf personally led his forces against the intruders, but his horse fell into a pit dug by the Slavs around their camp and he was surrounded and killed. He was succeeded by his brother Radoald.

Regnal titles
Preceded by Arechis I	Duke of Benevento; 641–642	Succeeded by Radoald
