= Xue Zongzheng =

Chinese historian

Xue Zongzheng (Chinese: 薛宗正; born 1935) is a Chinese historian, a director of Ancient History at the Institute of History in Xinjiang Academy of Social Sciences, and a professor of History at Xinjiang Normal University. Born in Jinan, Shandong, he graduated with a history degree from Peking University in 1958, specializing in frontier policies of ancient China and the history of Central Asia. He published several books in Chinese.

== Publications ==
- A History of Turks. Beijing: Chinese Social Sciences Press. 1992. (“突厥史" 中国社会科学出版社 1992年)
- A Study of Western Boundary's Frontier Poetry in the Past Dynasties. Lanzhou: Dunhuang Literature and Art Press. 1993. ("历代西陲边塞诗研究" 敦煌文艺出版社 1993年)
- Anxi and Beiting Protectorates. Harbin: Heilongjiang Education Press. 1995. ("安西与北庭" 黑龙江教育出版社 1995年)
- Rise and Decline of Tubo Kingdom. Beijing: Nationalities Press. 1997. ("吐蕃王国的兴衰" 民族出版社 1997年)
- The Pronunciation of the Han and Jin Dynasties and the Toponym of the Ancient Western Region. Journal of Xinjiang University. January 2000 ("汉晋古音与古西域地名" 新疆大学学报 2000年01期)
- Xinjiang's Historical Events Listed in Divani Lugatit Turk. Journal of Xinjiang University. January 2001 ("《突厥语词典》中的新疆史事" 新疆大学学报 2001年01期)
- A Study on Multilateral Relations Among the Tibetan, Uighur and Karluk — On the Contend in the Western Regions After An and Shi's Rebellions of the Tang Dynasty. March 2001 ("吐蕃、回鹘、葛逻禄的多边关系考述 — 关于唐安史乱后的西域角逐" 西域研究 2001年03期)
- A History of On Oq Khans in the Late Western Turks. Journal of Xinjiang Normal University. April 2001 ("后西突厥两厢可汗始末" 新疆师范大学学报 2001年04期)
- The Royal Gar and the Tibetan-Subjected Western Turkic Regimes — With the Discussion About the Contend Between Tang Dynasty and the Tibetan in the Western Region. China's Borderland History and Geography Studies. April 2002 ("噶尔家族与附蕃西突厥诸政权 — 兼论唐与吐蕃间的西域角逐" 中国边疆史地研究 2002年04期)
- From Shule to Jiashizhili. Xinjiang Academy of Social Sciences. February 2005 ("从疏勒到伽师祗离" 新疆社会科学 2005年02期)
