= Irbis (Khazar) =

Alleged founder of the Khazar Khaganate

- House: Ashina
- Religion: Tengrism

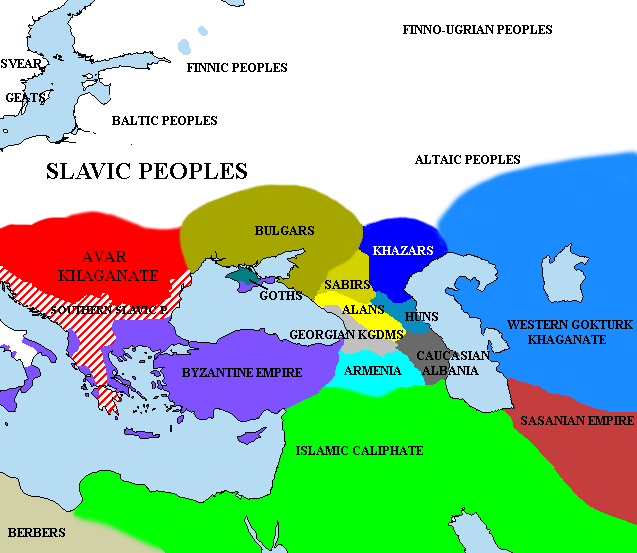
The Pontic steppe in ca. 650, showing the early territory of the Khazars and their neighbors.

Irbis (fl. 650 or 652) was according to a number of Russian sources the founder of the Khazar Khaganate. The Khazars traced their origin to the Turkic Ashina clan who also founded the Onok Khaganate and Turkic Khaganate in Central Asia.

Peter Golden notes that Chinese and Arabic reports are almost identical, making the connection a strong one, and conjectures that the Khazar leader may have been Irbis Seguy, who lost power or was killed around 651.
