= Yukuk Shad =

Qaghan of the Western Turkic Khaganate (Dulu faction)
- Reign: 638–642
- Predecessor: Ishbara Tolis
- Successor: Irbis Seguy

Ruler of Tokharistan
- Reign: 642–653
- Predecessor: Ishbara Yabgu
- Successor: Zhenzhu Yabgu
- Born: Ashina Yugu 阿史那欲谷
- Died: 653; Kunduz
- Issue: Zhenzhu Yabgu
Regnal name
- Yipi Duolu Khagan (Chinese: 乙毘咄陸可汗, romanized: Yǐpí Duōlù Kèhán)
- House: Ashina
- Father: Illig Qaghan
- Religion: Tengrism

Irbis Tuglugh Qaghan (Note: The most accepted version of his name is Irbis Tughlugh or Irbis Dulu, however other scholars propose different names, explained below.) (Chinese:乙毘咄陸可汗, romanized: Yǐpí Duōlù Kèhán), personal name Ashina Yukuk (Chinese:阿史那欲谷), was an Eastern Türk prince (Tegin) who reigned as the Qaghan the Western Turkic Khaganate between 638 and 642 and later a Tokhara Yabghu until his death. Yukuk previously served as a shad (governor-prince) in the Eastern Turkic Khaganate. After its collapse, Yukuk was invited by the nobles to become a qaghan of Western Göktürks.

== Name ==
His name was recorded as Yugu She (Chinese: 欲谷设, romanized: Yùgǔ Shè). Turkic transliteration of this name, Yukuk means "owl", according to Gumilyov, or "venerable", according to Gabain. Russian Turkologist Sergei Klyashtorny considered his name to be derived from yoquq (“precious”). His full title was recorded as Yipi Duolu Khagan (Chinese: 乙毘咄陸可汗, romanized: Yǐpí Duōlù Kèhán). According to Zuev's reconstructed Old Turkic title, it was *Yelbi Türük Qaghan. He further argued that his title Yipi was a Chinese rendion of Yelbi (sorcerer), which was a sign of him being a "shaman-king". According to Marcel Erdal, however, *yelbi was a proto-Turkic term for "sorcery", not a "sorcerer". Another proposed transliteration of his name is Irbis (snow leopard), a name attested many times among Western Turkic regnal names. Christoph Baumer reconstructed his name as Illig Beg Tughluk. Yet another reconstructed version was offered as *El Bilge Türk.

== Biography ==
=== In East ===
He was born to Illig Qaghan, ruler of the Eastern Turkic Khaganate and spent his early years there as ruling prince over Tiele tribes. In 627, he was assigned to suppress a rebellion of Uyghurs modern Gansu with some 400,000 horsemen, but were defeated by an army of only 5,000 horsemen commanded by the Uyghur chieftain Yaoluoge Pusa. In a memorandum to Taizong, Zhang Gongjin pointed to Yukuk Shad’s defeat as a counterexample to the supposed invincibility of the Türks. Yukuk was forced to retreat to Tian Shan mountains and from there to Gaochang. After his father's fall in March 630 near Tieshan, Yukuk also returned from Gaochang submitted to Taizong in autumn of that year.

=== In West ===
After the death of Tong Yabghu Qaghan of the Western Turkic Khanate in 628, the central authority of the khagans among the West Turks was challenged by the leaders of the ten tribes collectively known as Onoq. However, there was also competition between the two wings of Onoq; i.e., the Duolu and the Nushibi. Ishbara Tolis who became khagan in 634 tried to increase his authority with the support of Nushibi. But his camp was raided and he fled to Fergana (in modern Uzbekistan). But even after his escape, the leaders of the ten tribes preferred a khagan from the Ashina house to maintain the delicate balance between the two wings. Yukuk's name was proposed by an unnamed tudun and Kül Irkin of Esegel tribe, leader of the Nushibi. Yukuk whose father's territory had been lost readily accepted the invitation. But it soon turned out that although he was welcome by Duolu, the Nushibi tribes opposed him. Early plan for the convened the people together with the tudun and others was to set up Yukuk Shad as the great qaghan, and intended to make Ishbara Tolis as lesser qaghan. However, the tudun was killed, and Yukuk Shad was defeated by Nushibis. Ishbara then recovered his former territories.

In 638, Yukuk was recognized as Yipi Duolu Khagan in the west. Once he took power, new khagan engaged Ishbara Tolis in large-scale battles. As a result, the Western Turks were split: west of the Ili River belonged to Yipi Duolu, and east of the Ili belonged to Ishbara Tolis. Yipi set his khaganal court west of Mount Zuhe (鏃曷山), calling it the Northern Court. The peoples of Jueyueshi (厥越失), Basmil (抜悉蜜), Boma (駁馬), Kyrgyz (結骨), Huoxun (火尋), and Chumukun (触木昆/処木昆) all became his vassals according to Tongdian. He also sent governors to Kucha, Yanqi (Karashahr), Shan-shan and Qiemo in the east; Čač (Tashkent), Kang (Samarkand), Kesh (Shahrisabz), west of Oxus, south of Zarafshon and Tocharistan in the west.

Next year, in 639, a tudun ilteber under Ishbara Tolis rebelled in favor of Yipi, forcing Ishbara to flee to Fergana where he died. The chieftain of the Nushibi tribe welcomed Ashina Baobu (also known as Bopu Tegin (薄布特勤), a nephew of Ishbara Tolis) and set him up as the new khagan. The new khagan was recognized by Taizong, who sent Zhang Dashi, General of the Left Commandant Army, to bestow drums and standards upon Baobu. Yipi, however, sent his tudun of Tashkent to attack and execute Baobu, incorporating his realm. He then conquered Tuhuoluo (吐火羅; i.e. Bactrian-speaking Tokharoi or Tocharians) and attacked Yiwu (modern Yizhou District, Hami) in 642, which had by now been converted into the Tang's Yi Prefecture (伊州). The Anxi Protector-General Guo Xiaoke led 2,000 light cavalry to defeated his raiding party. Yipi also sent the Chuyue (処月) and Chumi (処密) tribes to besiege Tianshan County; Guo Xiaoke again attacked and routed them. Pressing his advantage, Guo advanced, subdued chief of the Chuyue, pursued them to Mount Esuo (遏索山), beheaded over a thousand, and compelled the Chumi tribes to surrender.

Soon he began to suffer dissent within, as he was said to have hoarded the spoils from attacks on the Sogdian states of Kangju (康居) and Maymurgh (米 Mǐ; on the Amu Darya near today Panjakent) and refused to divide them with his subordinates, and when one of his generals, Nishu Čor (泥孰啜) nevertheless seized some, Yukuk Shad executed him, causing Nishu's subordinate, chief of Huluwu (胡祿屋) tribe to rebel. The rebels sought aid from the Tang as Yali Čor (屋利啜), plotted to depose him and went to Tang, petitioning that a new khagan be established. Meanwhile Huluwu chief mobilised the Nushibi troops and attacked Yipi at the city of Baishuihu (modern Saran, Kazakhstan). The Nushibi forces were defeated, but Yipi, realising he had lost popular support, fled west to Tokharistan. Soon Taizong dispatched envoys to set up the son of Ashina Moheduo as Irbis Seguy Qaghan.

He spent the rest of his life in Kunduz and died in 653. His heir was Zhenzhu Yabgu, who was one of the last representatives of the family. But his authority was limited to a single city.

== Notes ==
1. Chinese: 藥羅葛菩薩; pinyin: Yàoluógé Púsà was a Chinese rendering of the Turkic name Old Turkic: 𐰖𐰍𐰞𐰴𐰺 𐰯𐰆𐰽𐰺, romanized: Yaɣlaqar Pusar, itself a version of Bodhisattva.
2. For a discussion of this word, see Kipchaks article.

== Sources ==
- Hung, Hing Ming (2013). Li Shi Min, Founding the Tang Dynasty: The Strategies that Made China the Greatest Empire in Asia. Algora Publishing. ISBN 978-0-87586-980-3.

Yukuk Shad Ashina Clan
Preceded by Ishbara Tolis	Khagan of the Western Turkic Khaganate; 638–642	Succeeded by Irbis Seguy
