= Irbis Seguy =

Irbis Shegui Qaghan
- Ninth Qaghan of the Western Turkic Khaganate
- Reign: 642–651
- Predecessor: Irbis Ishbara Yabgu Qaghan (in the south); Yukuk Shad (in the north)
- Successor: Ashina Helu
- House: Ashina
- Father: El Kulug Shad
- Religion: Tengrism

Irbis Shekui Khagan (full title: Yǐpíshèkuìkĕhàn 乙毗射匮可汗) (r. 642–651) was the penultimate ruler of the Western Turkic Khaganate. He was linked to the Nushibi faction and was son of El Kulug Shad.

== Reign ==
Irbis Seguy overthrew Yukuk Shad (r. 638–642) in 642 with support from the expanding Tang dynasty of China. Although Yukuk Shad was still active and controlling part of the territory, Irbis Shekui had the support of the Nushibi tribes. During the early years of his reign the rivalry between the Nushibi and Duolu cooled off.

In 646, he sought a Chinese princess for his bride. In return, Emperor Taizong of Tang demanded the return of several Tarim Basin cities. When this was refused the Chinese invaded the Tarim. Two years later several Duolu leaders took refuge in China. With them the khaganate also lost Dzungaria to China.

Ashina Helu rebelled against him in 646, but was defeated. In 651 he was overthrown by Ashina Helu who was now supported by the Duolu and Tang China.

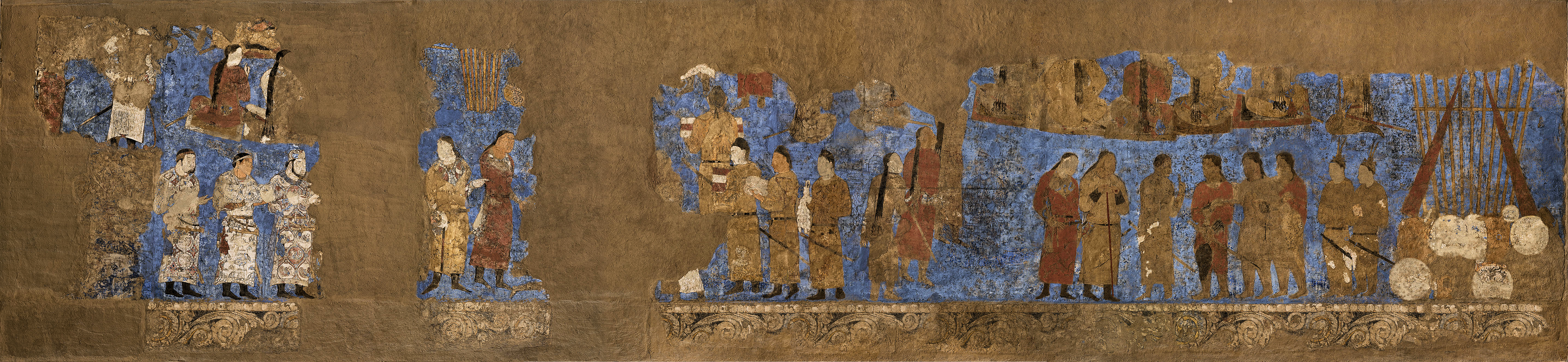
Ambassadors from various countries (China, Korea, Iranian and Hephthalite principalities...), paying hommage to king Varkhuman and possibly Western Turk Khagan Shekui, under the massive presence of Turkic officers and courtiers. Afrasiab murals, Samarkand, 648–651.

== See also ==
- Irbis (Khazar)

Irbis Seguy Ashina Clan
Preceded by Yukuk Shad	Khagan of the Western Turkic Khaganate; 642–651	Succeeded by Ashina Helu
