= Lady Kʼawiil Ajaw =

Queen regnant of the Maya city-state of Cobá (r. 640–682)

Lady Kʼawiil Ekʼ
- Ajaw
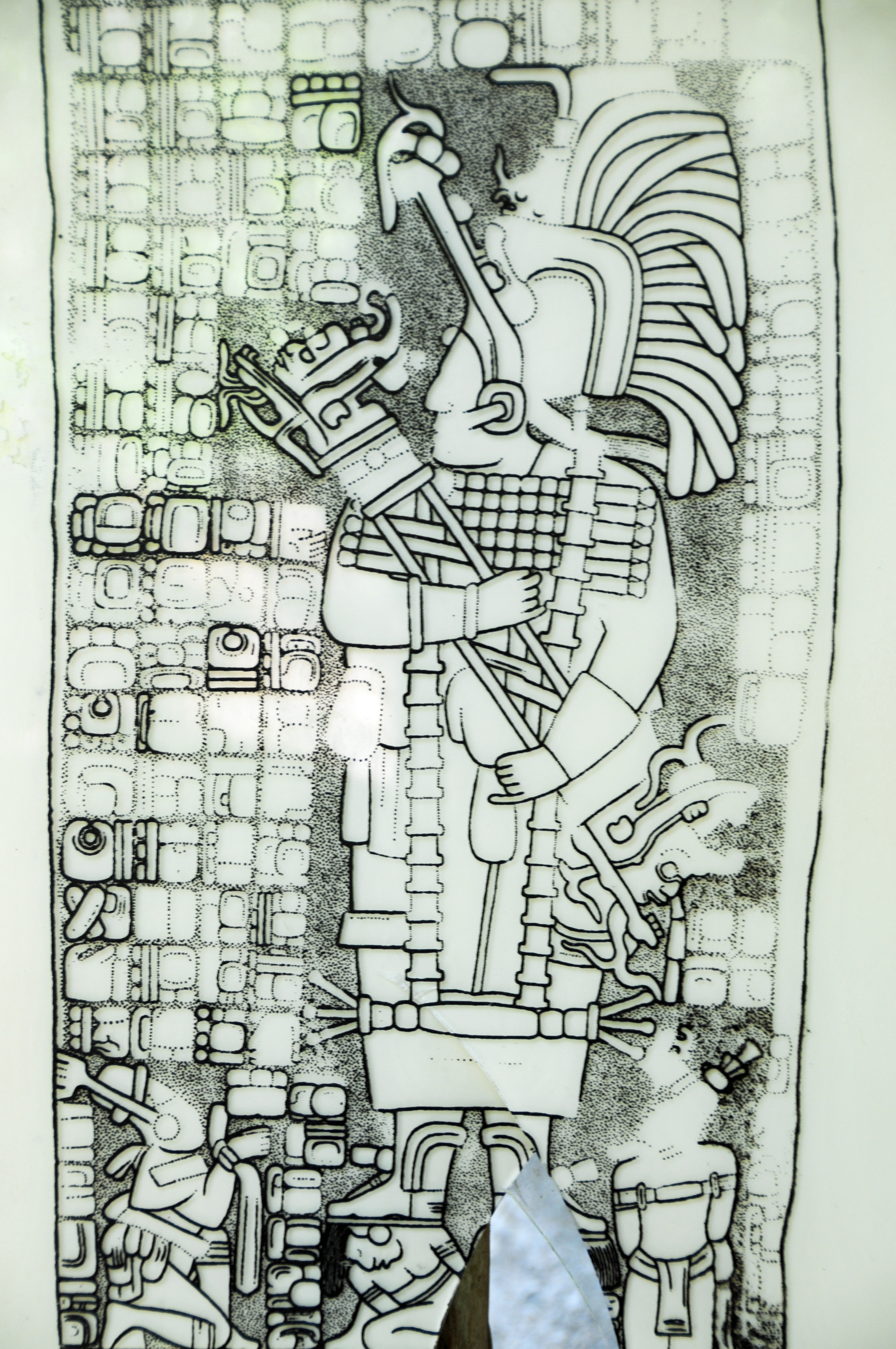
- Lady Kʼawiil's portrait on Stela 1 of Cobá

Queen of Cobá
- Reign: 6 April 640 - 682
- Predecessor: Sihyaj Chan Kʼawiil
- Successor: Chan Yopaat
- Born: 25 June 617; Cobá
- Died: 682 (aged 64–65); Cobá
- Issue: Chan Yopaat
- House: Snake dynasty
- Father: Sihyaj Chan Kʼawiil
- Mother: Lady of Stela 3
- Religion: Maya religion

Lady Kʼawiil Ajaw or Ix Kʼawiil Ekʼ (617-682) was a queen regnant of the Maya city-state of Cobá in 640–682.

It is not clear how she succeeded to the throne or how she is connected to her predecessors. She appears to have succeeded a male ruler. It is seen as likely that she was the daughter, granddaughter or niece of her predecessor. She does not appear to have been the first woman ruler of Cobá. Archeological evidence appear to attest to a ruling queen, also named Lady Kʼawiil Ajaw (I) and with the title kaloomteʼ, ruling as the founder of the Coba dynasty in the late 5th- or early 6th-century. Monuments of a second woman, who ruled around the year 600 (Che'enal), has been found at Coba. Lady Kʼawiil Ajaw (II), therefore, appears to have been at least the third woman to rule in the city state.

She bore the title kaloomteʼ ('superior warrior'), which was a very high title in contemporary Maya culture, and not worn by all rulers. She is depicted on the Stela 1 of Coba. The front of Stela 5 likely portrays the husband of Lady Kʼawiil Ajaw. He is depicted only once, while she is depicted many times, signifying that she held the actual power, and he was her consort.

On the stelae she commissioned, she is depicted presiding over, or treading upon, over a dozen captives under her feet, a larger number than any other Maya queen, and more than almost any other Maya king. Her portraits regularly show her wearing a belt with triplicate jade masks, and associated dangling celts, which was costume elements otherwise found only in portraits of males.

Many monuments in Coba attest to the reign of Lady Kʼawiil Ajaw (II). She herself commissioned stelae 1 and 5 of Cobá. Her reign took place during a period of golden age of Coba, with political continuity, economic prosperity, and expansionistic, militaristic power, and not a vassal of Calakmul, which many other Maya states at this point were. Yaxuná were either conquered by Coba, or consolidated as its possession, during her reign. She was possibly the monarch who ordered the construction of Cobá's famous causeway, Sacbe 1, between Cobá and Yaxuná. K’awiil Ajaw led successful military campaigns that led to the expansion of Cobá's territory.

She appears to have been succeeded by king Chan Yopaat in 682. Archaeological evidence, and inscriptions from Tikal and Edzná, suggest that Cobá's power waned shortly after her death.
