= Ishbara Tolis =

Ishbara Tolis Qaghan

Qaghan of the Western Turkic Khaganate
- Reign: 634–639 (as khagan); 639–659 (as Nushibi khagan)
- Predecessor: Duolu Qaghan
- Successor: Yukuk Shad (in the west); El Kulug Shad (in the east)
- Born: Ashina Tong'e 阿史那同俄
- Died: 659
- Issue: El Kulug Shad
- House: Ashina
- Father: Bagha Shad
- Religion: Tengrism

Ishbara Tolis was the ruler of Western Turkic Khaganate between 634 and 639. His full title was Shābōluō xìlìshī (~diélìshī) kèhán (沙钵罗咥利失可汗), personal name Ashina Tong'e (阿史那同俄).

== Reign ==
Ishbara Tolis's father was Bagha Shad. After his elder brother Duolu Qaghan abdicated, he was enthroned in 634 in unfavorable circumstances. He had to rely on vassal tribes which were more powerful than himself. In 635, he sent arrows to ten tribes which was meant to legitimatizing them as shads (semi independent governor princes), but he was careful to keep the delicate balance between the two rival factions by appointing five from Duolu and five from Nushibi. Thus his empire came to be known as Onoq, meaning "ten arrows" (十箭). This policy however, wasn't successful. A noble named Tun Tudun revolted and caused Ishbara to flee to Qarasahr with his brother Böri Shad. However, he was reinstalled to throne by the Nushibi noble Esegel Kul-Erkin who killed Tun Tudun. Meanwhile, the Duolu tribes appointed Yukuk Shad, a prince from the recently collapsed Eastern Turkic Khaganate, as their ruler.

== Later reign ==
After the Duolu–Nushibi split, he spent rest of his life among his former Nushibi subjects, east of the Ili River. He was killed by one of his own men in 659, on the orders of Yukuk Shad.

Ishbara Tolis Ashina Clan
Preceded by Duolu Qaghan	Khagan of the Western Turkic Khaganate; 634–639; 639–659	Succeeded by Yukuk Shad (in the west); El Kulug Shad (in the east)
