= Radoald of Benevento =

Radoald (also spelled Raduald or Radoaldo) (died 647) was the duke of Benevento (the southernmost Lombard duchy in medieval Italy) from 642 until his death in 647. He was the son of Gisulf II of Friuli and Romilda of Friuli, later being adopted by Arechis I of Benevento. Arechis’ natural son, Aiulf, was mentally unstable, necessitating Radoald and his brother Grimoald to serve as his regents.

In 642, Slavic plunderers landed near Siponto on the Adriatic. Aiulf personally led his forces against the intruders. When his horse fell into a pit dug by the Slavs around their camp he was surrounded and killed. Radoald, who knew the Slavic language, conversed with the invaders, causing them to lower their guard, whereupon his forces were able to expel them from the land. With the support of King Rothari, Radoald succeeded Aiulf.

The Romans of Salernum negotiated a truce with Beneventum.

Radoald was succeeded by Grimoald.

Regnal titles
Preceded by Aiulf I	Duke of Benevento; 646–647	Succeeded by Grimoald I
