= Arechis I of Benevento =

Arechis I (also Arigis, Aretchis, Italian: Arechi) was the second Duke of Benevento from 591 to his death in 641.

He was from the region of Friuli and was a relative of the dukes there. He was appointed by King Agilulf in the spring of 591, after Dukes Zotto's death; he was possibly Zotto's nephew. Arechis was practically independent because his duchy was separated from northern Italy by a stretch of Byzantine territory.

He conquered Capua and Venafro in the Campania and areas of the Basilicata and Calabria. He failed to take Naples after a siege (Zotto had failed likewise), but he took Salerno by the late 620s. He spent the last years of his reign establishing good relations with the Roman Catholics of his duchy. When he died his domain passed to his son Aiulf, despite his recommendation of his adopted sons Radoald and Grimoald.

Regnal titles
Preceded by Zotto	Duke of Benevento; 591–641	Succeeded by Aiulf I
