= Duchy of Friuli =

Italian polity (568–828)

Duchy of Friuli Ducatus Foroiuliensis (Latin)
- 568–828
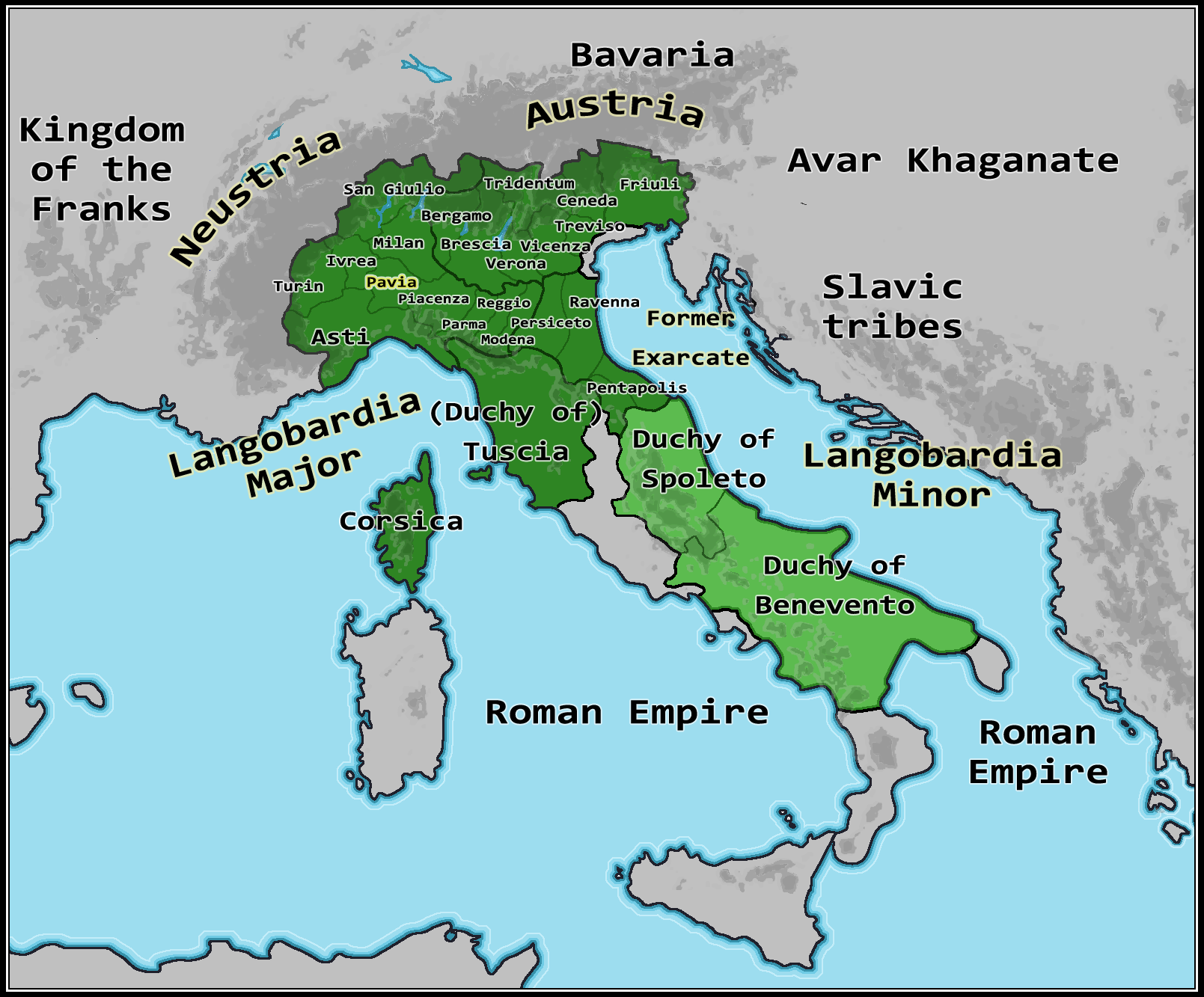
- The Duchy of Friuli in the northeast within Lombard Italy
- Status: Duchy of the Lombards; (568-774); Duchy of Francia; (774-828)
- Capital: Cividale
- Common languages: Friulian; Lombard; Latin
- Duke of Friuli
  - 568-~584 or 568/c.584–590: Grasulf I or Gisulf I (first)
  - 774-776: Hrodgaud
  - 819-828: Baldric (last)
- Historical era: Early Middle Ages
  - Established: 568
  - Avar invasion: 610
  - Lombard Kingdom conquered: 773-774
  - Divided into smaller counties: 828
  - Reestablished as the March of Friuli: 846
Preceded by	Succeeded by
Byzantine Empire under the Justinian dynasty	March of Friuli
- Today part of: Friuli-Venezia Giulia

The Duchy of Friuli (Latin: Ducatus Foroiuliensis) was a Lombard duchy in present-day Friuli, the first to be established after the conquest of the Italian Peninsula in 568. It was one of the largest domains in Langobardia Major and an important buffer between the Lombard kingdom and the Slavs, Avars, and the Byzantine Empire. The original chief city in the province was Roman Aquileia, but the Lombard capital of Friuli was Forum Julii, modern Cividale.

Along with the dukes of Spoleto, Benevento and Trent, the lords of Friuli often attempted to establish their independence from the royal authority seated at Pavia, though to no avail. After the Lombard campaign of Charlemagne and the defeat of King Desiderius in 774, Friuli was incorporated into the Carolingian Empire, but the last Lombard duke Hrodgaud of Friuli was left at his post, until he rebelled in 776, and was deposed.

Under Carolingian rule, the duchy gradually expanded into a vast frontier province, since Franks took Istria from the Byzantines in 788, and then continued to advance towards east during the Avar Wars in the 790s. Newly acquired eastern territories, from Carniola to Lower Pannonia were also placed under administration of Frankish dukes of Friuli, until 828, when the duchy was finally divided into four counties, with central Friulian region being consequently organized as the March of Friuli.

== History ==
=== Origins ===
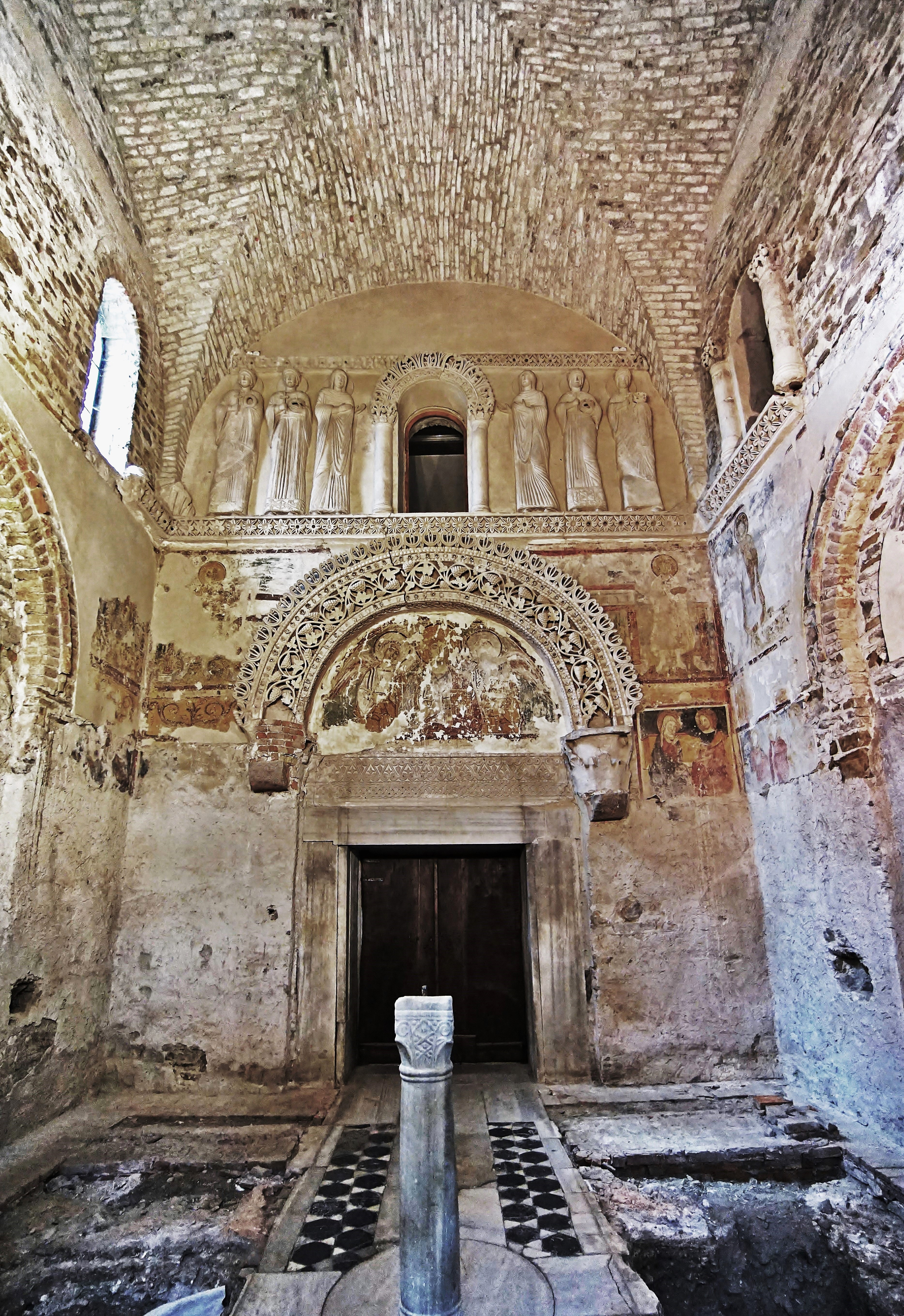
Interior of the Lombard Tempietto in Cividale del Friuli

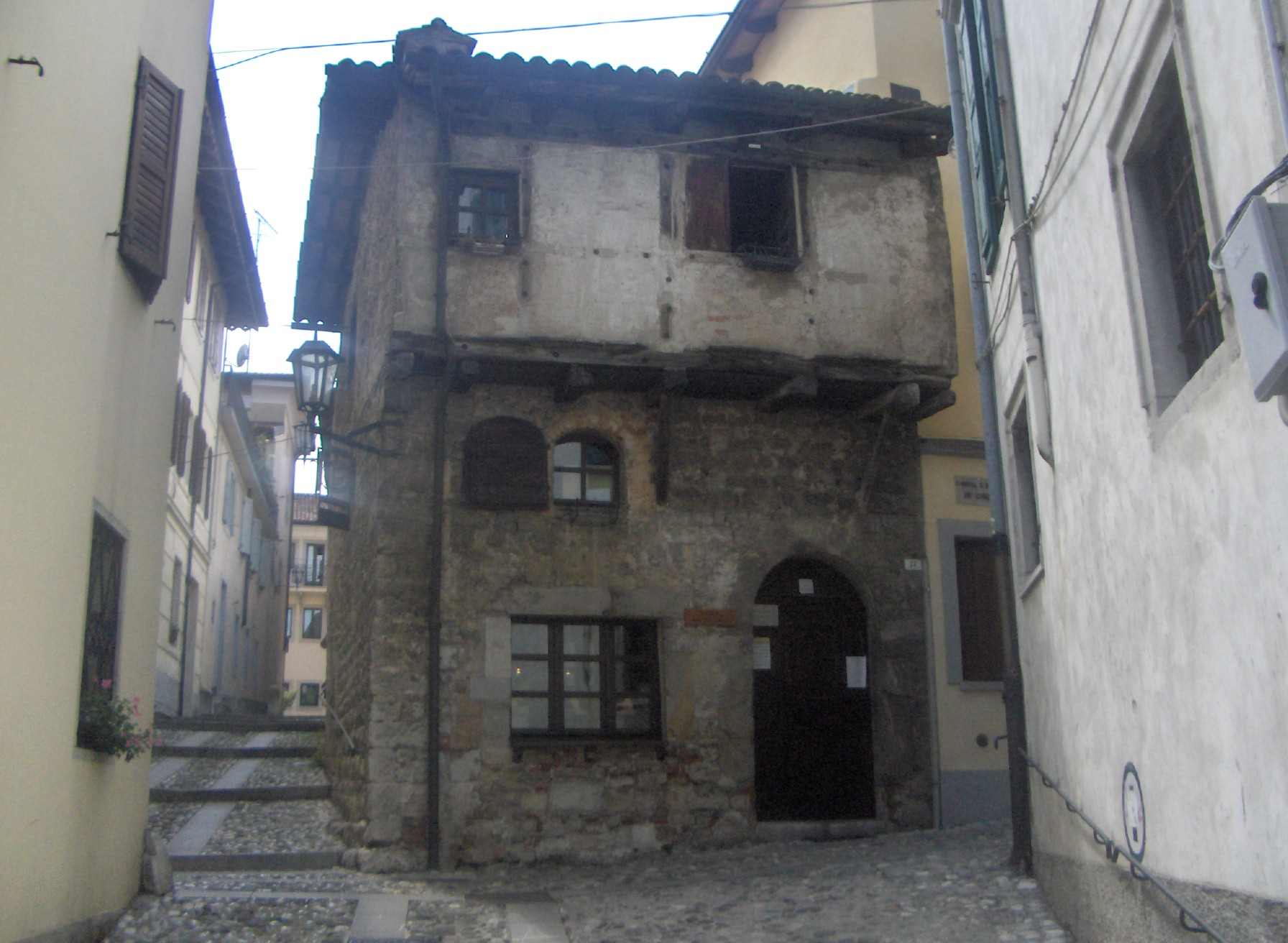
Medieval house in Cividale del Friuli

The Venetian territory around Forum Iulii, still devastated by the Gothic War, was the first in former Roman Italy to be conquered by the Lombards under their king Alboin in 568. Before continuing on to penetrate Italy further southwards, Alboin left a large garrison at Cividale and placed the government of the district under his nephew and Marepaphias (shield-bearer), Gisulf as a dux, who was allowed to choose the faras or noble families with which he wished to settle the land.

The original duchy was bound by the Carnic Alps and Julian Alps to the north and northeast and was hardly accessible from those directions. It was bound by the Byzantine Exarchate of Ravenna to the south, where it did not have a coastline until later, and by a plain that led to the Pannonian Basin in the east, a perfect access point for invaders, such as the Avars and later the Magyars. Its western border was originally undefined, until further conquests had established the Lombard duchy of Ceneda, which lay beyond the Tagliamento river, between the Livenza and the Piave Rivers. From the beginning, then, the Duchy of Friuli had a military role which it retained throughout the whole period of the Lombard kingdom and meant that it always played an important role in Italian politics, such that several of its dukes achieved the rank of king.

Grisulf, a capable ruler according to the Historia Langobardorum chronicles by Paul the Deacon, suppressed the Roman population in Friuli. He gained even greater influence during the Lombard interregnum upon the death of King Cleph in 574. Little is known of Gisulf's first successor, Grasulf I

=== Seventh century ===
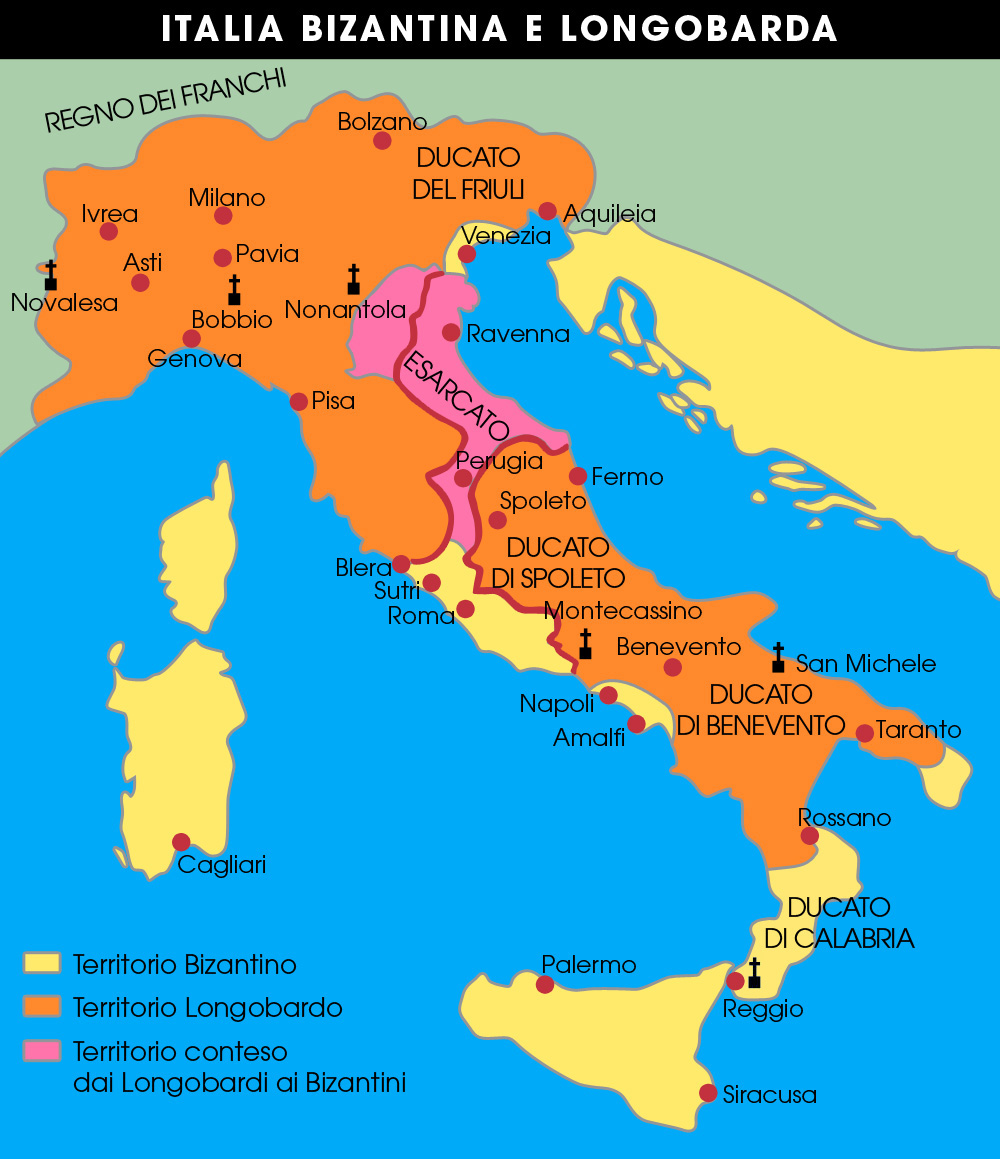
Byzantine and Lombard Italy

Around 610, Avar forces invaded Friuli pillaging the Lombard settlements. While King Agilulf did not take any action, Duke Gisulf II was killed in battle when the invaders occupied his residence at Cividale. Paul the Deacon recounts the event in epic tones. Paul, who was originally from the duchy of Friuli also recounts in detail the betrayal of Romilda, Gisulf's wife, who handed the city of Cividale over to the Avars. They sacked the duchy and then withdrew to Pannonia. Gisulf II's sons, Tasso and Kakko had narrowly managed to escape the battle in which their father lost his life and assumed control of Friuli. They undertook a campaign against the Slavs and temporarily extended the eastern borders of the duchy up to Matrei in present East Tyrol. The Slavs continued to pay tribute to Friuli until the reign of Ratchis. The brothers also undertook campaigns against the Byzantine forces in Italy. In 615, Concordia was captured, and around 625 the brothers were killed in an ambush at the Byzantine city of Oderzo by the patrician Gregorius.

The Ducal throne was then assumed by Grasulf II, brother of Gisulf II (and thus Tasso and Kakko's uncle). However Gisulf's other brothers, Romuald and Grimoald refused to accept Grasulf's superiority and relocated to the court of Arechis in the Duchy of Benevento. Paul the Deacon recounts the reigns of Grasulf and his successor Ago very briefly, but they continued the war against the Byzantines and Opitergium was conquered in 642. Duke Lupus undertook an expedition against Grado in 662, in which he sacked the city and seized the treasures of the Patriarchate of Aquileia himself. The Duke was very closed with Grimoald (now King of the Lombards), who entrusted him with his palace in Pavia when he went away to Benevento, but in 663 Lupus rebelled. Grimoald then made an agreement with the Avars who invaded the duchy and killed Lupus. They then refused to withdraw and continued their raids until Grimoald himself intervened and managed to induce them to return to Pannonia. Grimoald installed Wechtar as the next duke, rather than Lupus' son Arnefrit.

Wechtar, originally from Vicenza, rebuffed a new Slavic incursion at Natisone. After him, the throne passed to Landar for a few months and then to Rodoald (671). He was deposed around 695 by Ansfrid and was forced to flee first to Istria, then to Ravenna and finally to Pavia and the court of King Cunipert. The king seemed to tolerate Ansfrid's usurpation, but a little later he also rebelled from Cunipert and attempted to seize the throne. This rebellion - the last in a series of uprisings which all arose in the north-eastern sector of the Lombard kingdom - was a manifestation of the unwillingness of the Lombards of this region (known as 'Austria') to accept the pro-Catholic policy of the Bavarian dynasty. Under the leadership of the dukes of Friuli and Trent on various occasions these revolts gathered together the Arian and traditionalist (i.e. militaristic and expansionist) groups in opposition to the pacifist policy followed by the kings in Pavia, who were inclined to maintain the status quo with the Byzantines and the Papacy. On this occasion however, King Cunipert had the better of it; Ansfird was captured near Verona and sent into exile. In his place, Cunipert installed a loyal supporter, Ado, the brother of the deposed Duke Rodoald. He reigned as duke for a little over a year.

=== Eighth century ===
On Ado's death, at the beginning of the 8th century, the duchy passed to Ferdulf, "a slippery and arrogant man", according to Paul the Deacon, who sought easy military glory and therefore convinced some Slavs to invade his own duchy. However, the battle resulted in a Lombard defeat, due to internal division between the Duke and a nobleman called Argait. The Slavs achieved an easy victory, due to grave tactical errors on the part of the Lombards and exterminated almost the entire Friulian nobility. Both Ferdulf and Argait died and the only person who performed well was Munichis, father of the future duke Peter. The reign of Ferdulf's successor Corvulus was also brief, since he was arrested and deposed for offending the king. He was replaced with Pemmo around 710.

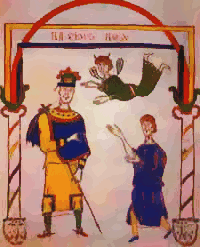
Rachis in a miniature.

Pemmo was esteemed by Paul the Deacon (who calls him "an intelligent man who was useful to the country"). He had to confront the Slavs whom he defeated and forced to accept his terms. A little later, however, he came into conflict with the Patriarch of Aquileia, Callixtus. The Patriarch protested against the fact that the bishop of Zuglio, Fidentius, had moved his seat from his actual diocese to Cividale - a decision which was confirmed by Fidentius' successor, Amator. Callixtus, whose titular see was Aquileia, but who had himself moved to Cormons because Aquileia was too vulnerable to Byzantine attack, considered another bishop based in the ducal capital to be inconvenient. So he drove Amator out of the city and took over his residence for himself. Pemmo did not accept the patriarch's actions and moved against Callixtus, imprisoning him in harsh conditions. At this point, King Liutprand intervened against the duke, stripped him of his title and handed the duchy to his oldest son, Rachis.

The new duke led an expedition into the Slavic territory (Carniola) and pillaged it as a proof of his valour. Rachis and his warriors also distinguished themselves in the defence of Liutprand when he was attacked and betrayed on the march to Fossombrone by the rebellious Duchy of Spoleto. As a result of the prestige that he had gained from these ventures, Rachis became king of the Lombards in 744, deposing Liutprand's successor Hildeprand after a few months of rule. Rachis assigned the duchy to his brother Aistulf, who only held it for a few years, since in 749 he succeeded Rachis (who had been deposed by his dukes) as king of Italy.

Information about the situation in the Duchy during the final years of the Lombard kingdom is scarce. It was ruled by the co-regents, Anselm and Peter (749–756) and the final duke that we know of was Hrodgaurd (774–776). It is likely that in these years, when the Lombard kingdom was ruled by sovereigns of Friulian origin and the central power was particularly strong, that the autonomy of the duchy was very limited. An indirect piece of evidence for this is the fact that Istria, which was conquered by Aistulf after he became king, was not annexed to the Duchy, but remained under direct royal control.

=== Carolingian Duchy of Friuli ===
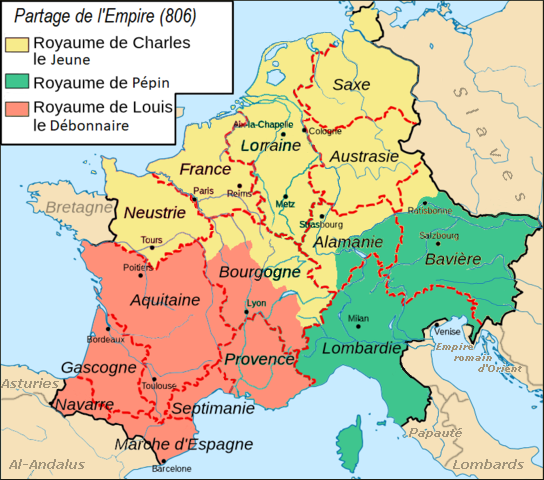
Charlemagne's succession settlement of 806: Italy with Friulian dependencies, and Bavaria with western marches assigned to Pepin (green)

After the Siege of Pavia in 774, the Lombard kingdom was conquered by Charlemagne who was proclaimed "By Grace of God, King of the Franks and Lombards". He created a personal union of the two kingdoms. Although the Leges Langobardorum were maintained, he reorganised the kingdom on the Frankish model, with counts rather than dukes, but powerful duke Hrodgaud of Friuli was allowed to keep his duchy, until he rebelled in 776. He was killed in battle and replaced with Macarius.

In 781, Carolingian Italy, including Friuli, was assigned to Charlemagne's son Pepin as King of Italy. By 788, Frankish rule was imposed on neighboring Istria, until then an overseas territory of the Byzantine Empire. During the Avar Wars of the 790s, king Pepin and his commanders led several successful campaigns towards the eastern regions, from Carniola to Lower Pannonia. Those regions were organized as frontier territories, and placed under administration of Frankish dukes of Friuli. Thus the administrative scope of the duchy extended far towards the east. Lamenting on the death of duke Eric of Friuli in 799, patriarch Paulinus II of Aquileia claimed that achievements of the late Friulian duke reached as far as Sirmium.

In 806, emperor Charlemagne inaugurated a succession settlement, assigning to Pepin not only Italy and its Friulian dependencies, but also Bavaria with its eastern marches. In 810, king Pepin was succeeded by his son Bernard, but only in Italy, since his position was not firm (being not born from a legitimate marriage). Already in 814, Bernard's paternal uncle, new emperor Louis the Pious, appointed his oldest son Lothair to govern Bavaria. Thus a complex situation started to emerge, regarding the jurisdiction over various south-eastern frontier regions. In 817, emperor Louis issued Ordinatio Imperii, and appointed his son Louis as king in Bavaria, with additional jurisdiction over Carantania, Bohemia and other dependent Slavs and Avars.

By the end of the same year (817), Bernard was deposed and Italy was given to Lothair. His dukes of Friuli, Cadolah (817–819) and Baldric continued to exercise jurisdiction not only over Istria and Carniola, but also Carantania. Only in 828, when Baldric was deposed, the duchy was subdivided into four counties, with Friuli proper and Istria remaining under jurisdiction of Lothair's Italian realm, while Carniola and Lower Pannonia were transferred to the jurisdiction of the Bavarian realm. In the same time, the question of effective rule over Carantania was also resolved in favor of Louis of Bavaria.

Thus the vast Carolingian duchy of Friuli ceased to exist, and the central Friulian region was consequently organized as the March of Friuli.

In the early modern period, the Habsburg-ruled Princely County of Gorizia and Gradisca covered eastern parts of the former Duchy of Friuli. The Habsburg monarchs thus used the historic title of "Duke of Friuli" in their grand title of the Emperor of Austria.

== Dukes ==
- 568–c.584 Grasulf I
- 568/c.584–590 Gisulf I
- 590–610 Gisulf II
- 610–617 Tasso
- 610–617 Kakko
- 617–651 Grasulf II
- 651–663 Ago
- 663–666 Lupus
- 666 Arnefrid
- 666–678 Wechtar
- 678–??? Landar
- ???–694 Rodoald
- 694 Ansfrid
- 694–705 Ado
- 705 Ferdulf
- 705–706 Corvulus
- 706–739 Pemmo
- 739–744 Ratchis, also king of the Lombards
- 744–749 Aistulf, also king of the Lombards
- 749–751 Anselm (d.806)
- 751–774 Peter
- 774–776 Hrodgaud

=== Carolingian appointees ===
- 776–787 Marcarius
- 789–799 Eric
- 799–808 Hunfrid
- 808–817 Aio
- 817–819 Cadalaus
- 819–828 Balderic

== Sources ==
- Altmann, Wilhelm; Bernheim, Ernst (1891). Ausgewählte Urkunden zur Erläuterung der Verfassungsgeschichte Deutschlands im Mittelalter. Berlin: Gaertners Verlagsbuchhandlung.
- Bowlus, Charles R. (1995). Franks, Moravians, and Magyars: The Struggle for the Middle Danube, 788-907. Philadelphia: University of Pennsylvania Press.
- Goldberg, Eric J. (2006). Struggle for Empire: Kingship and Conflict under Louis the German, 817-876. Ithaca, NY: Cornell University Press.
- Kardaras, Georgios (2018). Byzantium and the Avars, 6th-9th Century AD: Political, Diplomatic and Cultural Relations. Leiden-Boston: Brill.
- Nelson, Janet L. (2019). King and Emperor: A New Life of Charlemagne. Oakland: University of California Press.
- Peters, Edward; Foulke, William D., eds. (2003) [1907]. Paul the Deacon: History of the Lombards. Philadelphia: University of Pennsylvania Press.
- Pohl, Walter (2018). The Avars: A Steppe Empire in Central Europe, 567-822. Ithaca and London: Cornell University Press.
- Reuter, Timothy (2013) [1991]. Germany in the Early Middle Ages c. 800–1056. London and New York: Routledge.
- Schutz, Herbert (2004). The Carolingians in Central Europe, Their History, Arts, and Architecture: A Cultural History of Central Europe, 750-900. Leiden-Boston: Brill.
- Scholz, Bernhard W., ed. (1970). Carolingian Chronicles: Royal Frankish Annals and Nithard's Histories. Ann Arbor, MI: University of Michigan Press.
- Vicelja-Matijašić, Marina (2005). "Byzantium and Istria: Some Aspects of Byzantine Presence in Istria" (PDF). Acta Histriae. 13 (1): 185–204.
- Wickham, Chris (1981). Early Medieval Italy: Central Power and Local Society, 400-1000. Totowa, NJ: Barnes & Noble.
