= March of Friuli =

Buffer territory of the Carolingian Empire in Southern Europe (776-952)

Coordinates: 46°9′4″N 13°3′21″E

March of Friuli Margraviatus Forumiulii
- 828–952
- March of Friuli and the surrounding lands
- Status: March of the Carolingian Empire; (828-887)
- Common languages: Friulian
- Government: March
- Margrave of Friuli
  - 846-866: Eberhard (first)
  - 924-952: Berenger II (last)
- Historical era: Early Middle Ages
  - Established: 828
  - Disestablished: 952
Preceded by	Succeeded by
Duchy of Friuli	March of Verona
- Today part of: Italy; Slovenia; Croatia

The March of Friuli was a Carolingian frontier march, centered in the historical region of Friuli (corresponding mainly to the modern province of Friuli-Venezia Giulia in north-eastern Italy). Since the Frankish conquest and pacification of the Lombard Kingdom in 774-776, the Duchy of Friuli was placed under the administration of Frankish dukes and gradually expanded towards eastern territories, serving as the main frontier march against the Slavs and Avars. It was reorganized in 828, and its central region (Friuli) was placed under administration of local counts, later margraves. In 843, the region was attached to the Middle Francia, and governed by margraves (sometimes also referred as dukes) from the house of Unruochings. The region remained linked to the Carolingian and post-Carolingian Italy until 952, when it was ceded to the Duchy of Bavaria as the March of Verona. Its core territory comprised parts of modern-day Italy and Slovenia.

== History ==
After Charlemagne had conquered the Italian Kingdom of the Lombards under King Desiderius at the Siege of Pavia in 774, he at first allowed the Lombard duke Hrodgaud to continue ruling in Friuli. Charlemagne attached the March of Istria to Friuli. According to the Royal Frankish Annals, Hrodgaud two years later revolted declaring himself a King of the Lombards, whereafter Charlemagne came rushing into Italy where he routed the duke's forces and had him deposed and killed. The autonomous Lombard duchy was dissolved and incorporated into Francia. From 776, Friuli was ruled by Frankish appointees, who continued to bear the title of a dux Foroiuliensis. To the former Lombard duchy he added Pannonia as an integral part of his Carolingian Empire and a bulwark against the encroachments of the Avars and the Croats.

In February 828 the last Friulian dux, Baldric, was removed from office by Emperor Louis the Pious at the Imperial diet of Aachen, as he had not been able to defend the Pannonian frontier against the troops of Khan Omurtag of Bulgaria. The duchy was divided into four counties, one of them being the Friuli proper, that was attached to the Middle Frankish realm in 843, ruled by Louis' eldest son Emperor Lothair I. He bestowed Friuli on his brother-in-law Eberhard, of the Frankish Unruochings, with the title of dux, though his successors were called marchio: "margrave".

Eberhard's son Berengar, Friulian margrave since 874, was elected King of Italy after the deposition of Charles the Fat in 887. His election precipitated decades of contests for the throne between rival claimants. Berengar paid homage to the East Frankish king Arnulf of Carinthia, he nevertheless lost the crown to Duke Guy III of Spoleto in 889 and did not succeed in recapturing it until 905. Meanwhile, represented by his counsellor Walfred at the city of Verona, he remained master in Friuli, which was always the base of his support. After Berengar's death in 924, his partisans elected Hugh of Arles king.

King Hugh did not appoint a new margrave and the march lay vacant. It remained a political division of the Frankish Kingdom of Italy until the usurpation of the throne by Berengar II upon the death of Hugh's son King Lothair II in 950. Summoned by Lothair's widow Adelaide of Burgundy, the German king Otto I took the chance to conquer Italy, depose Berengar II and to marry Adelaide. The conflict was settled at the 952 diet of Augsburg, where Berengar II was allowed to retain the royal title as a German vassal, but had to cede Friuli as the March of Verona to Duke Henry I of Bavaria, brother of King Otto I. On February 2, 962 Otto was crowned Holy Roman Emperor at Rome, deposed King Berengar II and had him arrested and exiled one year later. His remaining Italian kingdom became a constituent part of the Holy Roman Empire.

The Veronese march was held by the Carinthian dukes from 976 well into the High Middle Ages. In 1077 King Henry IV of Germany vested the Patriarchate of Aquileia with the Friulian territory east of the Tagliamento river.

== Governors ==
=== Dukes ===
- 776–787 Marcarius
- 789–799 Eric
- 799–808 Hunfrid
- 808–817 Aio
- 817–819 Cadalaus
- 819–828 Balderic

=== Margraves ===
- 830–866 Eberhard (also dux Foroiuli)
- 866–874 Unroch (III)
- 874–890 Berengar, also Holy Roman Emperor
- 891–896 Walfred
- 896–924 Berengar, also Holy Roman Emperor
- 924–952 Berengar II

== Sources ==
- Bowlus, Charles R. (1995). Franks, Moravians, and Magyars: The Struggle for the Middle Danube, 788-907. Philadelphia: University of Pennsylvania Press.
- Goldberg, Eric J. (2006). Struggle for Empire: Kingship and Conflict under Louis the German, 817-876. Ithaca, NY: Cornell University Press.
- McKitterick, Rosamond (1983). The Frankish Kingdoms Under the Carolingians, 751-987. Harlow: Longman.
- Krahwinkler, Harald (2005). "Patriarch Fortunatus of Grado and the Placitum of Riziano" (PDF). Acta Histriae. 13 (1): 63–78.
- Luthar, Oto, ed. (2008). The Land Between: A History of Slovenia. Frankfurt am Main: Peter Lang.
- MacLean, Simon (2003). Kingship and Politics in the Late Ninth Century: Charles the Fat and the end of the Carolingian Empire. New York: Cambridge University Press.
- Reuter, Timothy (2013) [1991]. Germany in the Early Middle Ages c. 800–1056. London and New York: Routledge.
- Riché, Pierre (1993). The Carolingians: A Family Who Forged Europe. Philadelphia: University of Pennsylvania Press.
- Rosenwein, Barbara H. (1996). "The Family Politics of Berengar I, King of Italy (888–924)". Speculum. 71 (2): 247–289.
- Vicelja-Matijašić, Marina (2005). "Byzantium and Istria: Some Aspects of Byzantine Presence in Istria" (PDF). Acta Histriae. 13 (1): 185–204.
- Wickham, Chris (1981). Early Medieval Italy: Central Power and Local Society, 400-1000. Totowa, NJ: Barnes & Noble.
