= AD 666 =

Calendar year

666 in various calendars
- Gregorian calendar: 666; DCLXVI
- Ab urbe condita: 1419
- Armenian calendar: 115; ԹՎ ՃԺԵ
- Assyrian calendar: 5416
- Balinese saka calendar: 587–588
- Bengali calendar: 72–73
- Berber calendar: 1616
- Buddhist calendar: 1210
- Burmese calendar: 28
- Byzantine calendar: 6174–6175
- Chinese calendar: 乙丑年 (Wood Ox); 3363 or 3156 — to — 丙寅年 (Fire Tiger); 3364 or 3157
- Coptic calendar: 382–383
- Discordian calendar: 1832
- Ethiopian calendar: 658–659
- Hebrew calendar: 4426–4427
- Hindu calendars
- Vikram Samvat: 722–723
- Shaka Samvat: 587–588
- Kali Yuga: 3766–3767
- Holocene calendar: 10666
- Iranian calendar: 44–45
- Islamic calendar: 45–46
- Japanese calendar: Hakuchi 17 (白雉１７年)
- Javanese calendar: 557–558
- Julian calendar: 666; DCLXVI
- Korean calendar: 2999
- Minguo calendar: 1246 before ROC 民前1246年
- Nanakshahi calendar: −802
- Seleucid era: 977/978 AG
- Thai solar calendar: 1208–1209
- Tibetan calendar: ཤིང་མོ་གླང་ལོ་ (female Wood-Ox); 792 or 411 or −361 — to — མེ་ཕོ་སྟག་ལོ་ (male Fire-Tiger); 793 or 412 or −360

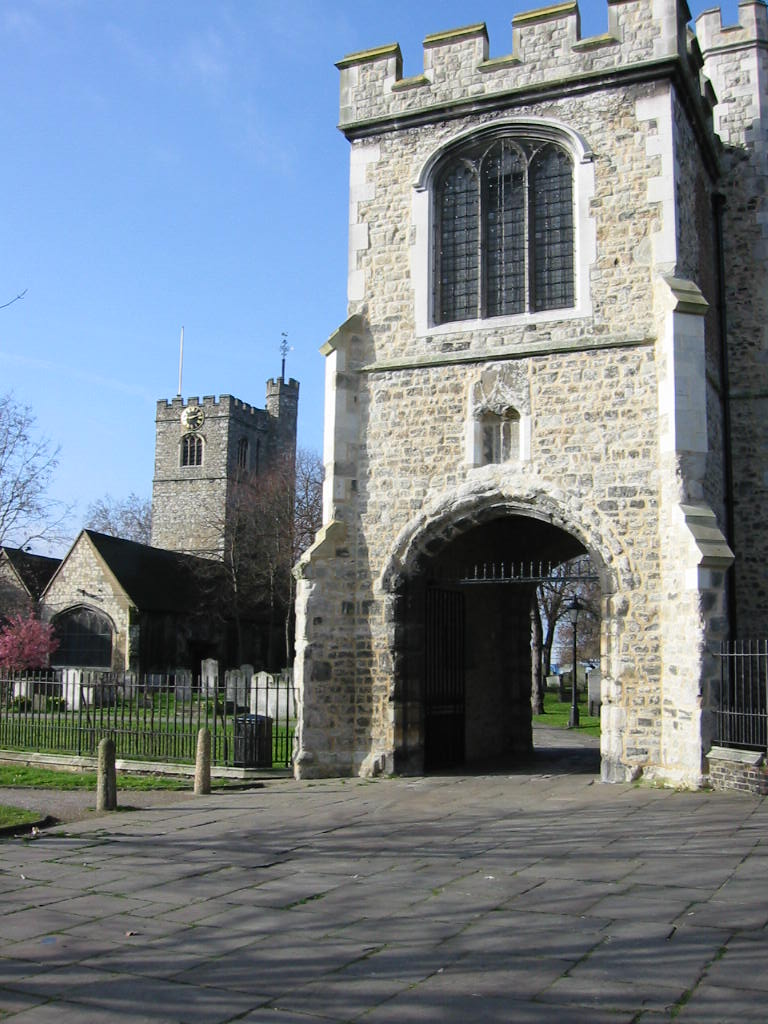
Barking Abbey: curfew tower (east London)

Year 666 (DCLXVI) was a common year starting on Thursday of the Julian calendar. The denomination 666 for this year has been used since the early medieval period, when the Anno Domini calendar era became the prevalent method in Europe for naming years.

== Events ==
=== By place ===
==== Byzantine Empire ====
- Emperor Constans II grants the request of Bishop Maurus of Ravenna, allowing the city to consecrate its bishop without approval from Rome (approximate date).

==== Europe ====
- Duke Lupus of Friuli revolts against King Grimoald I, with allied Avars. Grimoald takes and devastates Friuli, tracks down Lupus's son Arnefrit (allied with the Slavs), and beats him and kills him in battle at the castle of Nimis. Grimoald appoints Wechtar as the new duke of Friuli.
- In modern popular culture, the year 666 is sometimes associated with the symbolic "birth" of Eddie, the mascot of the English heavy metal band Iron Maiden, reflecting the number’s connection to the "number of the beast".

==== Asia ====
- Chinese Buddhist monks Zhi Yu and Zhi Yuo craft more south-pointing chariot vehicles (a non-magnetic, mechanical-driven directional-compass vehicle that incorporates the use of a differential).

==== Religion ====
- Wilfrid returns to Great Britain, but is shipwrecked in Sussex. When he finally reaches Northumbria, he finds he has been deposed and is forced to retire to Ripon.
- Earconwald, Anglo-Saxon abbot, establishes the Benedictine abbeys, Chertsey Abbey (Surrey) for men and Barking Abbey (now in east London) for women.

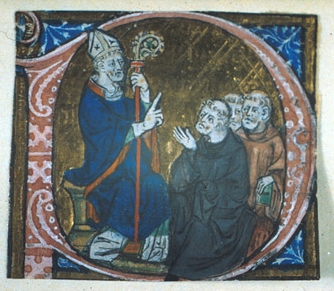
St Erkenwald, Saxon Prince, bishop and saint known as the "Light of London": founds two religious houses near London in this year

== Births ==
- Zhang Jiazhen, Chinese official

== Deaths ==
- Abd al-Rahman ibn Abi Bakr, first child of first Rashidun caliph, Abu Bakr
- Arnefrit, duke of Friuli (Northern Italy)
- Li Yifu, chancellor of the Tang dynasty
- Dou Dexuan, official of the Tang dynasty
- Liu Xiangdao, Chancellor of the Tang dynasty
- Linghu Defen, official of the Tang dynasty
- Yŏn Kaesomun, military dictator of Goguryeo
