= Ansfrid =

Ansfrid may refer to:

- Ansfrid of Friuli, duke
- Ansfrid of Nonantola, abbot
- Ansfrid of Utrecht (died 1010) (Saint Ansfrid), bishop
