= Avar Wars =

Military conflict

- Expansion of Francia
Date	788 to 803
Location	Avar Khaganate, Bavaria, Italy
Result	Frankish victory
Territorial changes	Pannonia seized by Francia, disintegration of the khaganate

Belligerents
Francia: Bavaria; Carantania; Italy; Friuli	Avar Khaganate

Commanders and leaders
Charlemagne: Pippin of Italy; Eric of Friuli; Woynimir; Theoderic; Maginfred	(Unknown)

The Avar Wars were fought between Francia and the Avar Khaganate in Central Europe from 788 to 803, and ended with the Frankish conquest of the khaganate's western regions. The first conflicts between the Avars and the Franks occurred in the 560s, shortly before the Avar conquest of the Pannonian Basin. Armed conflicts between the two powers were not unusual during the following centuries.

The conquest of the Kingdom of the Lombards in 774, and the subjugation of Bavaria in 788 by the Frankish king Charlemagne (r. 768–814) alarmed the Avars. They invaded Italy and Bavaria, but they were forced to withdraw. In the summer of 791, after unsuccessful peace negotiations, Charlemagne invaded the khaganate along the river Danube from the west, while his son King Pippin of Italy (r. 780–810) attacked from the southeast. Pippin pillaged an Avar fortress and seized much booty before returning to Italy. Charlemagne's troops destroyed two Avar fortresses across the Enns River but an equine epidemic killed about 90% of his horses, forcing him to abandon the campaign. During the following two years, he was mainly preoccupied with logistic projects, probably to facilitate the movement of his troops.

Taking advantage of an Avar civil war, Duke Eric of Friuli (r. 789–799) dispatched a highly mobile military unit to the khaganate under the command of the Slav Woynimir in 795 or 796. Woynimir captured the khagan's residence, or "ring", and seized much of the khagan's treasury. In 796 Pippin launched a new invasion of the khaganate and forced the khagan to submit himself to the Franks without resistance. The Avars who refused to live under Frankish suzerainty withdrew to the lands east of the river Tisza.

== Background ==
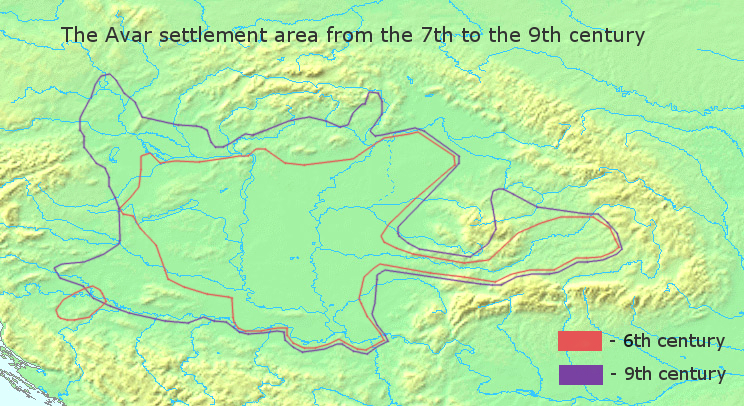
Avar settlement area

The Franks emerged from a loose confederation of Germanic tribes dwelling along the lower course of the river Rhine during the Late Roman period. After the Fall of the Western Roman Empire, the Frankish king Clovis I (r. 481–511) conquered a Roman rump state in northern Gaul and seized southern Gaul from the Visigoths. He converted to Catholicism which facilitated the amalgamation of the conquerors and the native Gallo-Romans. The expansion of the Frankish realm, or Francia, continued during the reign of his descendants, known as the Merovingians. The Franks conquered Burgundy, Provence, and the Alpine region, and subjugated the neighboring Germanic tribes—the Thuringi, Alemanni and Bavarians. The Merovingian kings had direct control over the lands between the rivers Loire and Rhine but the peripheries of Francia were governed by virtually autonomous rulers, among them the Agilolfing dukes of Bavaria. Francia was customarily divided among the kings' son which led to the development of three Frankish realms—Austrasia, Neustria and Burgundy. The frequent conflicts between the Merovingian kings contributed to the development of a powerful aristocracy.

Fleeing from the expansion of the First Turkic Khaganate in Central Asia, the Avars appeared on the European political scene in early 558. This year their delegation came to Constantinople and offered military support to the Byzantine Emperor Justinian I (r. 527–565) in return for gifts, a yearly subsidy and a territory where they could settle. Justinian accepted the offer, and the Avars—reportedly 20,000 mounted warriors—continued their westward migration and conquered the Turkic and Slavic tribes in the Pontic steppes. The first confrontation between the Avars and Franks occurred when the Avar invasion of Thuringia around 562. On this occasion, the Neustrian king Sigebert I (r. 561–575) routed them on the river Elbe. The Avars launched a new invasion of Francia in 566. This time they defeated Sigebert but withdrew in return for supplies of food. In 567, the Avar khagan Bayan I (r. 562–602) accepted the Lombards' offer for an alliance against the Gepids, and the allies invaded the Gepids' realm in the eastern regions of the Carpathian Basin. The Gepids could not resist, and the Avars conquered their lands. Early next year, the Lombards voluntarily abandoned the Basin's western region for northern Italy, and the Avars took possession of all the plains along the Middle Danube and its tributaries.

The Avar Khaganate was a multiethnic state with Slavs, Gepids and Bulgars living under Avar rule. Part of the local Romanized population, an important element of the bearers of the "Keszthely culture", also survived in Pannonia. The Avars made regular raids against the Byzantine Empire and seized important Byzantine border forts in the 580s. They forced the Byzantines to pay an annual tribute—initially 900 pounds of gold, but it quickly grew to over 1,600 pounds. The Avars closely cooperated with the Slav tribes which facilitated the Slavs' expansion both in the Balkan Peninsula and in Central Europe. Around 596, a Bavarian army attacked the Slavs on the river Drava but Bayan intervened and routed the Bavarians. Before long, he invaded Thuringia and forced the Franks to pay a tribute for his withdrawal. According to gossips spreading in Francia around 610, Queen Brunhilda (d. 613) who administered Burgundy on behalf of her underage grandson Theuderic II (r. 595–613) wanted to conclude an alliance with the Avars against Theuderic's elder brother Theudebert II of Austrasia (r. 595–612).

The Avars and their Slav allies laid siege to Constantinople in cooperation with the Sasanian Empire in 626, but they could not capture the city. The fiasco caused bitter internal conflicts in the khaganate. The Wends, described as Avar warriors' sons by Slavic women in the Chronicle of Fredegar, rose up in open rebellion against their Avar masters. (Note: The Chronicle of Fredegar states that the Wends rose up in the fortieth year of the reign of the Frankish king Chlothar II (r. 584–629) but its chronology is unreliable.) A Frankish merchant Samo (d. c. 658) played a preeminent role in their first victory for which they elected him king. Samo consolidated his position through political marriages and defeated a Frankish expeditianory force in 631 or 632. Around the same time, an Avar succession crisis ended with the flight of 9,000 Bulgar warriors and their families to Bavaria where many of them were massacred on the orders of Dagobert I of Francia (r. 623–639). Samo's realm fell apart after his death and archaeological evidence indicates the Avars' westward expansion along the Danube in the second half of the 7th century. The Late Avar period which started around 680 saw fundamental changes in the khaghanate. Isolated burials and other signs of nomadism disappear while large cemeteries used by generation indicate the sedentarization of the Avar society.

By around 700, the course of the river Enns formed the khaganate's frontier with Bavaria. Conflicts between the Avars and Bavarians were not unusual. When Bishop Emmeram decided to leave for a proselytising mission to the khaganate, Duke Theodo of Bavaria (r. 670/680–715) dissuaded him because of an armed conflict along the frontier. When the Avars attacked the Slavic Carantanians in 741 or 742, the Carantanian prince Boruth (d. c. 750) sought assistance from the Bavarians. Duke Odilo (r. 737–748) marched to Carantania and defeated the Avars. He secured the Carantanians' loyalty through taking hostages and promoted Christianization of the Carantanians. Although the pagan Carantanians revolted at least three times, the Avars did not take advantage of the situation and refrained from invading Bavaria.

In Francia, the Merovingian kings' authority quickly weakened in the 7th century. An aristocratic family, later known as Carolingians, assumed real power as the hereditary holders of the important office of mayor of the palace. In 751, the Carolingian Pippin the Short (r. 751–768) deposed the last Merovingian rule Childeric III (r. 743–751) and assumed the title of king in 751.

== Wars ==
=== Prelude ===
After the Frankish conquest of the Kingdom of the Lombards, Francia became the Avars' sole western neighbour but the tradition of Avar–Lombard alliance allegedly survived. Aio, a leader of an unsuccessful Lombard rebellion against Charlemagne fled to the khaganate in 776. By the 780s, Bavaria remained the last autonomous duchy in Francia, and Charlemagne decided to subjugate it. He forced Duke Tassilo III (r. 748–788) to repeat his oath of allegiance to him at Worms in 781. Next summer Avar troops were assembling on the Enns, but they did not cross the river. Instead, an Avar delegation went to Lippspringe to start peace negotiations with Charlemagne but he only "heard and dismissed" the Avars. When Tassilo failed to obey Charlemagne's summons to attend an assembly at Worms in 787, Charlemagne invaded Bavaria, forcing Tassilo into submission. A year later, at an assembly in Ingelheim, Bavarians who were loyal to Charlemagne accused Tassilo and his Lombard wife Liutperga of conspiring with the Avars. They were found guilty and Tassilo was deposed. The historian Walter Pohl states that even though "the sources reflect Frankish propaganda, it is possible that a Bavarian–Lombard coalition of the defeated sought, with Avar help and Byzantine backing, to check Charlemagne's triumphal advance".

=== Avar attacks ===
Charlemagne's biographer Einhard (d. 840) says that aside from "the war against the Saxons, the greatest of all the wars waged by [Charlemagne] was the one against the Avars" in 791. According to Einhard's account, the war started in 788. Bavaria's full integration in Charlemagne's realm alarmed the Avars. They attacked northern Italy and Bavaria, but both armies were defeated. In retaliation for the invasions, two Bavarian commanders, Graman and Otachar led troops across the Enns and routed the Avars on the plains along the river Ybbs. The Avars launched a new invasion of Bavaria, but they were again defeated and many of the Avars fleeing from the battlefield drowned in the Danube. The khagan sent envoys to Worms to start negotiations about the borders. According to Pohl, the Franks probably wanted to seize lands across the Enns, but the Avars refused.

=== First Frankish campaign ===
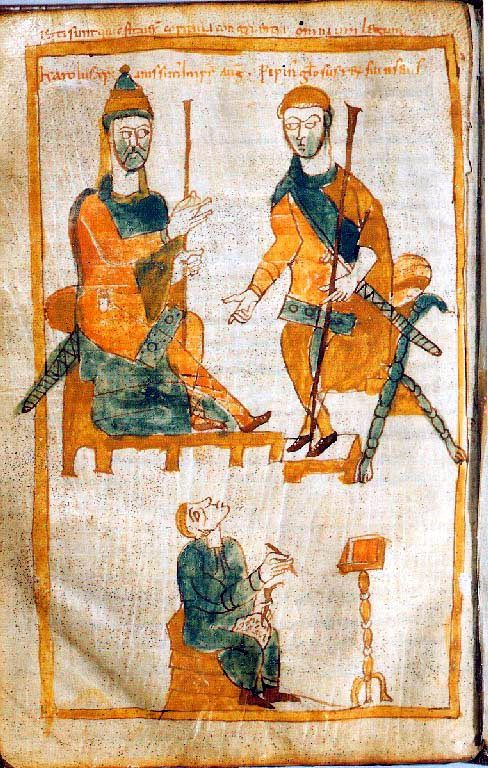
Charlemagne (left) and his son, Pippin of Italy (right)

Charlemagne came to Regensburg to make preparations for an invasion of the Avar Khaganate in early summer 791. The Royal Frankish Annals notes that the war was justified by the "excessive and intolerable outrage committed by the Avars". In preparation for the campaign, troops from Austrasia and Neustria assembled at Regensburg together with Saxons, Frisians, Ripuarian Franks, Thuringians, Alamanni and Bavarians. Charlemagne's younger son Louis came from Aquitania.

He ordered his eldest son Pippin, King of Italy (r. 780–810), to lead a scara—a highly mobile military unit—against the khaganate. This strike force reached Avar territory (probably the region between the rivers Drava and Sava) in August. They routed the Avars, pillaged an Avar fortress (Note: The Hungarian historian Sándor Márki argues that the fortress was likely Sirmium.) and seized much booty and 150 captives before returning to Italy. Charlemagne divided the main army into two parts. He appointed one of his relatives, Count Theoderic, and the chamberlain Maginfred to be the supreme commanders of the contingents of the Ripuarian Franks, Frisians, Saxons and Thuringians, and kept the rest of the Frankish troops along with the Bavarians and Alamanni under his own command. A fleet was also built for the Danube. His campaign started only after the end of the harvest season. The two armies marched along the two banks of the Danube but a later version of the Royal Frankish Annals indicates that at least part of the northern army marched through southern Bohemia. The historian Charles Bowlus proposes that the destruction of the Avar fortifications in the borderlands was Charlemagne's principal strategic purpose because as long as they existed the Franks were unable to make raids into Avar territory.

Before invading the Avar territory, the two armies pitched camp at Lorch near the frontier early in September. Clergymen accompanying the army ordered fasting to win divine favor on 5 September, although Charlemagne was reluctant to fast, according to his biographer, Einhard (d. 840). For three days, the consumption of meat was prohibited and the amount of the wine available to soldiers was limited. The clergy were singing psalms and reciting litanies, and each priest was required to say a mass. The army set off for Avar territory after one week or two, presumably when news about Pippin's victory reached the camp at Lorch. On learning of the Frankish invasion, the Avars abandoned their fortresses at the confluence of the river Kamp with the Danube and at Cumeoberg (near present-day Krems an der Donau and Tulln an der Donau, both in Austria, respectively) without much resistance. The fortress at Kamp was seized and destroyed by Maginfred. At Cumeoberg, Charlemagne's thirteen-year-old younger son, Louis was gilded with sword for the first time, but he soon returned to Francia. The Franks continued their invasion reaching as far as the river Rába. Here, according to a later version of the Royal Frankish Annals, a pestilence broke out in Charlemagne's camp killing about 90% of their horses. The historian Carroll Gillmor identifies the pestilence as Eastern equine encephalitis, a contagious disease spread by mosquitos. Pohl argues that it is "very likely that the disease had already affected the Avar horses, which may explain why the Franks encountered no resistance" during the campaign. Charlemagne was to abandon the campaign in the middle of October. His army returned to Bavaria via Savaria (now Szombathely in Hungary), while Theoderic and Maginfred led their troops across Bohemia.

The Annales laureshamenses states that Charlemagne's campaign lasted for 52 days. It was considered a significant military action: some charters issued at Freising were dated in reference to the campaign's year. At least two bishops—Sindpert of Regensburg and Angilram of Metz—died during the campaign but due to illness, not fighting the Avars.

=== Interval ===
After concluding the campaign, Charlemagne returned to Regensburg. He stayed in Bavaria in 792 and most of 793, although he faced serious problems in other parts of his empire, including a new uprising in Saxony and the rebellion of his illegitimate son Pepin the Hunchback (d. 811). Charlemagne's enemies noticed his preoccupation with Avar affairs. The Saxons sent envoys to the Avars to forge an alliance, and the Moors of Al-Andalus, or Muslim Spain, expected that the Avars would tie down Charlemagne's military forces in Central Europe. He did not launch new military campaigns in 792. Gillmore attributes Charlemagne's inactivity to the shortage of trained warhorses after the equine epidemic. Charlemagne was preoccupied mainly with logistical projects in 792 and most of 793. He ordered the construction of portable bridges to facilitate river crossing.

In 793, Charlemagne sent scarae to raid Avar territory. He left Regensburg for a new invasion of Avar territory but the Saxons rebelled and defeated Count Theoderic. After learning of the Saxons' victory, Charlemagne abandoned the military campaign. He decided to build a canal linking the Rhine and the Danube. A navigable canal could have eased the movement of troops and supplies towards the khaganate but he abandoned this ambitious project by the end of the year. Meanwhile, a civil war broke out in the Avar Khaganate, likely not independently of the permanent Frankish pressure. During the conflict, the khagan and another Avar leader, the iugurro were murdered by their people. A third Avar leader, the tudun sent envoys to Charlemagne's camp near the Elbe and offered his subjection to the Frankish king.

=== Sack of the "ring" ===
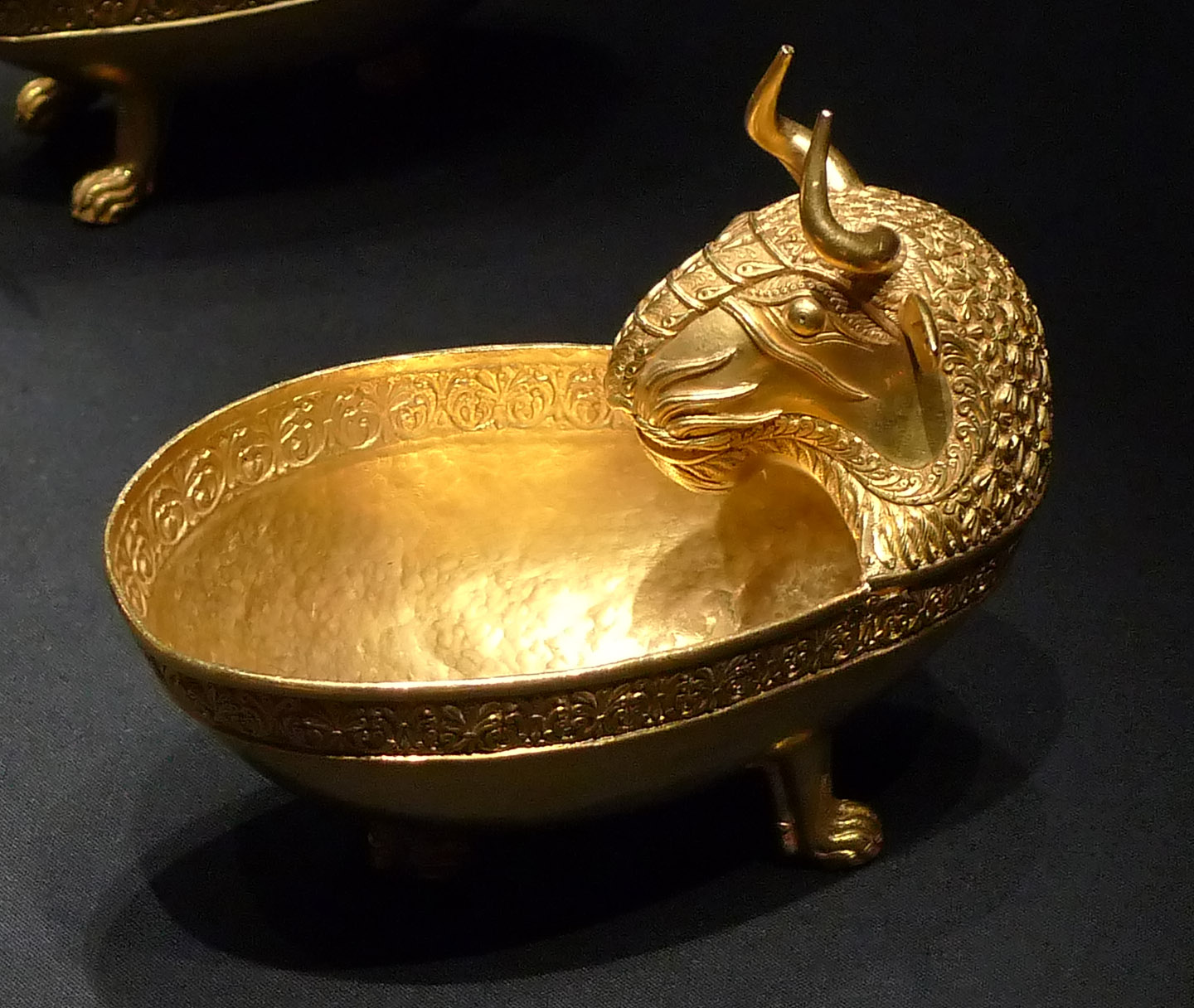
Bull's head bowl from the Treasure of Nagyszentmiklós, likely an Avar treasure

Taking advantage of the internal conflicts in the khaganate, Duke Eric of Friuli mustered troops for a surprise attack against the Avars in 795 or 796. (Note: The Royal Frankish Annals, the Annales laureshamenses and Einhard's chronicle assign this episode to 796 but Charlemagne forwarded part of the booty seized during the campaign to Rome in the winter of 795 and 796.) Instead of leading the risky operation in person, he appointed the Slav Woynimir to command it. Bowlus proposes that Woynimir was a South Slav leader, while Pohl thinks that he was an ambitious Slav warrior in Frankish service. Woynimir led his troops as far as the khagan's residence, known as the "ring" and located likely in the plains between the Danube and the Tisza. Pohl argues that the khagan's seat was "most likely a fixed palace settlement, laid out in a circle, with tents or wooden structures". Woynimir sacked the "ring" and seized much of his impressive treasure as booty. After Woynimir's return to Friuli, Duke Eric sent the booty to Charlemagne who gave part of the treasury to the pope.

=== Second Frankish campaign ===
Pippin of Italy and Eric of Friuli gathered troops for a new invasion of the Avar Khaganate in 796. Charlemagne sent Bavarian and Alamannian reinforcements to join his son's campaign. Bowlus proposes that the Bavarians followed the route that Charlemagne had taken in 791, while the Alamannians crossed the Alps via the Brenner Pass to reach Avar territory. The Italian, Bavarian and Alamannian armies united in Lower Pannonia. They met no resistance while they were marching towards the Danube. The khagan, who had assumed power after the civil war, approached Pippin on the Danube accompanied by his wife and Avar dignitaries, including the katun and tarkhans. A contemporaneous panergy, De Pippini regis Victoria Avarica ("King Pippin's victory over the Avars"), states that an Avar named Unguimeri had convinced the khagan to submit to the Franks without resistance. The Avars who refused the khagan's reconciliatory policy withdrew to the lands to the east of the Tisza. Pippin crossed the Danube and seized much booty at the "ring" before destroying it. After his victory, Pippin held a synod on the Danube to make arrangement for the Christianization of the Avars. Under the direction of Patriarch Paulinus II of Aquileia (d. 802/804), the assembled clerics decided that the Christians who had lived under Avar rule were to be rebaptized only if untrained clerics had baptized them.

== Sources ==
- Bowlus, Charles (1995). Franks, Moravians, and Magyars: The Struggle for the Middle Danube, 788–907. Middle Ages. University of Pennsylvania Press. ISBN 0-8122-3276-3.
- Collins, Roger (2010) [1991]. Early Medieval Europe, 300–1000. Red Globe Press. ISBN 978-0-230-00673-7.
- Curta, Florin (2019). Eastern Europe in the Middle Ages (500–1300), Volume 1. Brill's Companions to European History. Vol. 19. Brill. ISBN 978-90-04-41534-8.
- Costambeys, Marios; Innes, Matthew; MacLean, Simon (2012) [2011]. The Carolingian World. Cambridge Medieval Textbooks. Cambridge University Press. ISBN 978-0-521-56366-6.
- Gillmor, Carroll (2005). Kelly, Devries; Clifford J., Rogers (eds.). "The 791 Equine Epidemic and its Impact on Charlemagne's Army". The Journal of Medieval Military History. III. The Boydell Press: 23–45. doi:10.1515/9781846154058-003. ISBN 1-84383-171-6.
- Geary, Patrick J. (1988). Before France and Germany: The Creation and Transformation of the Merovingian World. Oxford University Press. ISBN 0-19-504457-6.
- Nagy, Katalin (2005). "Notes on the Arms of the Avar Heavy Cavalry". Acta Orientalia Academiae Scientiarum Hungaricae. 58 (2). Akadémiai Kiadó: 135–148. doi:10.1556/AOrient.58.2005.2.2. ISSN 0001-6446. JSTOR 23658731.
- Pohl, Walter (2018) [2015]. The Avars: A Steppe Empire in Central Europe, 567–822. Cornell University Press. ISBN 978-0-8014-4210-0.
