= Leo I =

Leo I may refer to:

== People ==
- Pope Leo I (400–461), also known as Pope Saint Leo the Great
- Leo I (emperor), Roman emperor from 457 to 474
- Leo I, Prince of Armenia (d. 1140)
- Leo I, King of Armenia (1150–1219), sometimes also referred to as Leo II, or Levon I the Magnificent, first king of Cilician Armenia

== Other ==
- LEO (computer), first computer used for commercial business applications
- Leo I (dwarf galaxy), a dwarf galaxy that orbits the Milky Way Galaxy, and can be seen in the constellation of Leo
- The Leo I Group, a group of galaxies also known as the M96 Group

== See also ==
- Leo II (disambiguation)
