= Arnefrid =

Arnefrid or Arnefrit may refer to:

- Arnefrit of Friuli, duke of Friuli in 666
- Arnefrid (bishop of Constance) (fl. c. 736–746)
