= Peter of Friuli =

8th-century Italian duke

Peter or Petrus was the reputed son of Munichis and brother of one Ursus. Paul the Deacon records that Munichis died in the same battle as Ferdulf, Duke of Friuli, and that his son Peter and Ursus later became dukes of Friuli and Benevento respectively. The date of Peter's reign is unknown, but has been hypothesised as following that of Aistulf or Anselm in 756 or 751 and lasted until the Siege of Pavia.

== Sources ==
- Paul the Deacon. Historia Langobardorum.

Preceded by Aistulf	Duke of Friuli; 756–774	Succeeded by Hrodgaud
