= Abbey of Nonantola =

Coordinates: 44°40′41″N 11°02′37″E

Nonantola Abbey, dedicated to Saint Sylvester, is a former Benedictine monastery and prelature nullius in the commune of Nonantola, c. 10 km north-east of Modena, in the Emilia Romagna region of Italy. The abbey church remains as a basilica and is the co-cathedral of the diocese of Modena-Nonantola.

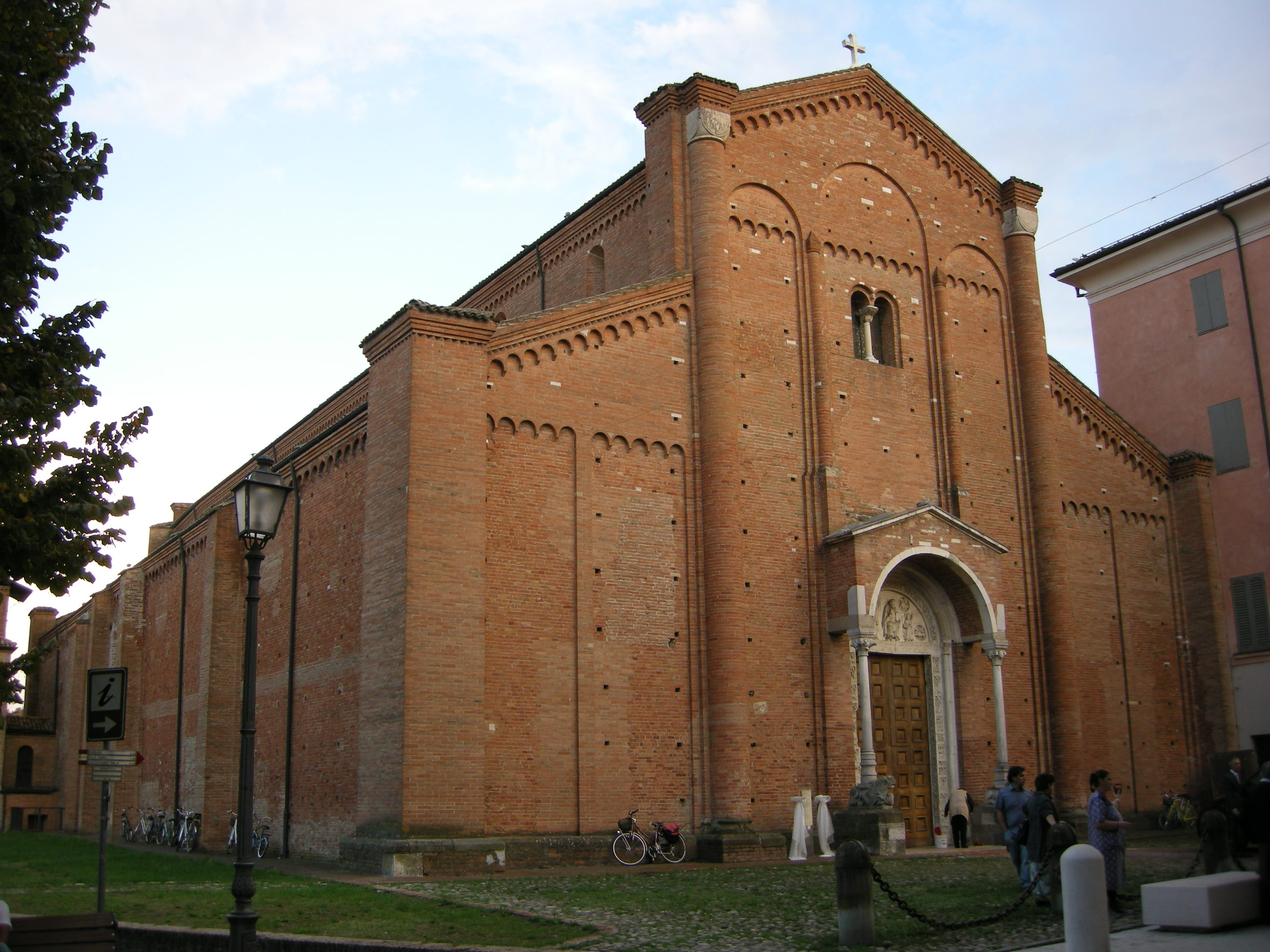
Abbey of Nonantola

== History ==
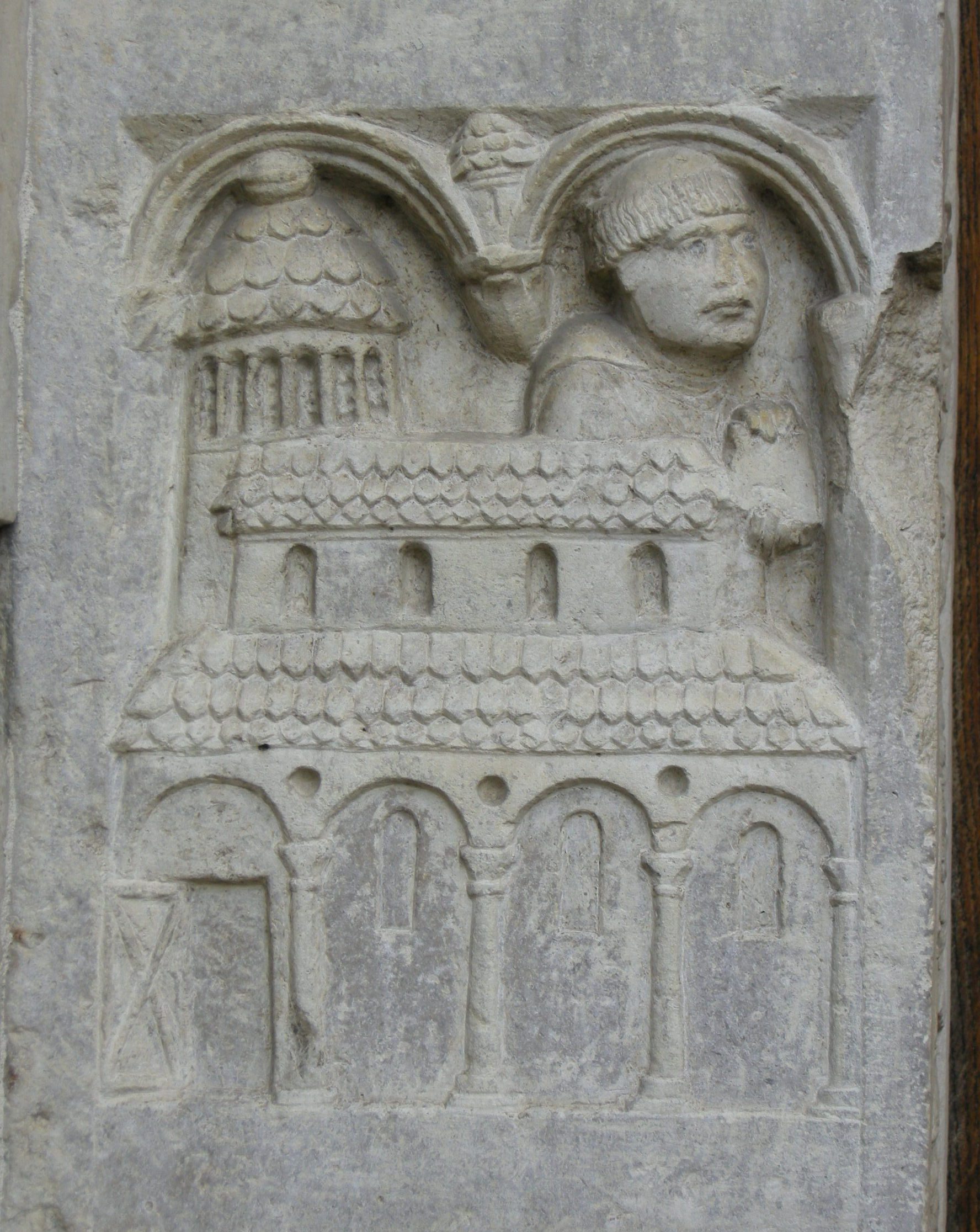
Relief of Anselm founding the Abbey

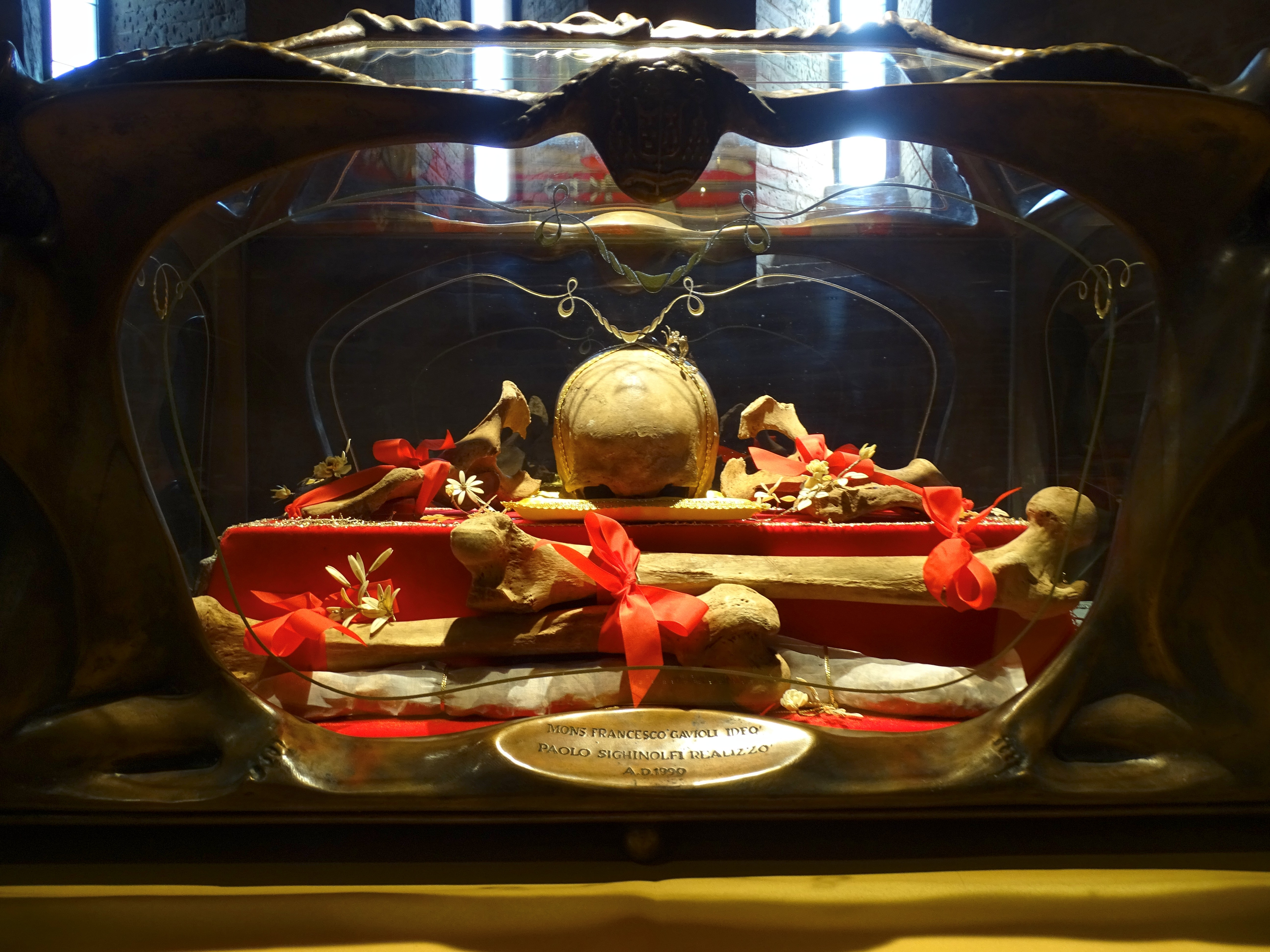
Relics of Saint Sylvester

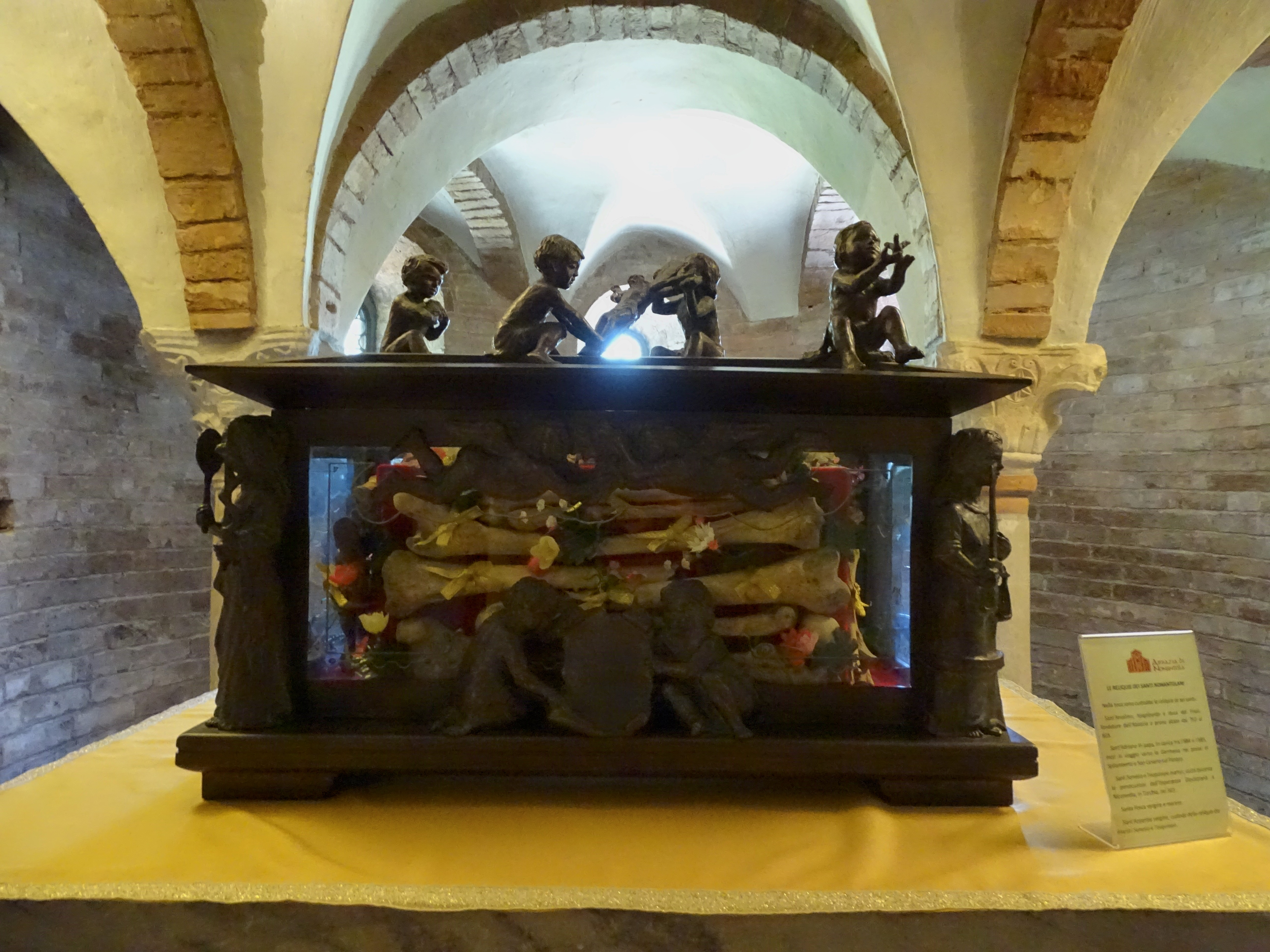
Relics of the Nonantolan Saints

The abbey was founded in 752 by Saint Anselm, Duke of Friuli and brother-in-law of the Lombard king Aistulf. The latter richly endowed the new abbey, starting its role as one of the main landed proprietors of northern Italy. Pope Stephen II appointed Anselm its first abbot, and presented some relics of Saint Sylvester to the abbey, named in consequence S. Silvestro de Nonantula. After the death of Aistulf in 756, Anselm was banished to Monte Cassino by the new king, Desiderius, but was restored by Charlemagne after seven years. In 813 the abbot Peter of Nonantola was chosen as Imperial ambassador to Constantinople. His successor, Ansfrid, held the same post in 828. In 883 the abbey was chosen as the place of a conference between Charles the Fat and Pope Marinus I.

In 900 the monastery and church were completely destroyed by invading Hungarians, and all who had not fled were killed. Reconstruction began almost immediately.

Up to the 11th century Nonantola was an imperial monastery, and its discipline often suffered severely on account of imperial interference in the election of abbots: Nonantola was in fact one of the most powerful abbeys of Europe and control over it was considered a major issue by the emperors and popes. It had a famous scriptorium and the abbot Godeschalc had a new basilica built in 1058. At the beginning of the Investiture Conflict it sided with the emperor, until forced to submit to the pope by Matilda of Tuscany in 1083. It finally declared itself openly for the papal party in 1111. In that year the famous monk Placidus of Nonantola wrote his De honore Ecclesiæ, one of the most able and important defences of the papal position that was written during the Investiture Conflict.

The decline of the monastery can be dated to 1419, when it came under the jurisdiction of commendatory abbots. In 1514 abbot Gian Matteo Sertorio gave it to the Cistercians, but the abbey continued to decline until it was suppressed by Pope Clement XIII in 1768. Alternatively it may have been replaced by Duke Francesco III d'Este in 1783, during the abbacy of Francesco Maria d'Este, with a collegiate foundation of canons.

Pope Pius VII restored it as a monastery on 23 January 1821, with the provision that the prelature nullius attached to it should belong to the Archbishop of Modena, into which the exempt territory was finally absorbed in 1986 to form the Diocese of Modena-Nonantola. The monastery itself was appropriated by the Italian government in 1866.

== Buildings ==
The Town Hall of Nonantola is now accommodated in some of the remaining monastic buildings, in one of which 11th-century frescoes have been discovered.

The Museo Benedettino Nonantolano e Diocesano di Arte Sacra ("The Benedictine Nonantolan and Diocesan Museum of Sacred Art") is also now housed in the premises, as are the important abbey archives and library.

== Basilica ==
The Basilica is a Romanesque edifice built during the tenure of abbot Damian, which in the early 20th century was restored to its original early 12th-century condition. The church has a nave and two aisles, with the presbytery. The crypt, with sixty-four columns, dates from the 8th century and contains relics of seven saints: Saint Anselm the founder (d. 3 March 803); the virgins Saint Fusca and Saint Anseris; the martyrs Saints Theopontus and Senesius, Saint Adrian III, and those of Saint Sylvester himself.

== List of abbots ==
=== Regular abbots ===
- Anselm (752–803), canonized
- Peter I (804–824)
- Ansfrid (825–837)
- Ratpert (838–839)
- Rotichild (839–842)
- Giselprand (842–851)
- Liutefred (851–855)
- Leo I (855–856)
- Peter II (856–865)
- Warnefrid (865–869)
- Ragimbald (869–870)
- Theodoric (870–887)
- Landefred (890–895)
- Leopardus (895–907)
- Peter III (907–913)
- Gregory (913–929), beatified
- Ingelbert (929–941)
- Gerlo (941–947)
- Gottifred (947–958)
- Guido (959–969), also bishop of Modena
- Umberto (969–974), also bishop of Parma
- John I the Archimandrite (982–997), also antipope
- Leo II (997–999)
- John II (999–1000)
- Leo III (1000–1002)
- Rudolf I (1002–1032)
- Rudolf II (1035–1053)
- Gottschalk (1053–1059)
- Landulf I (1060–1072)
- Damian (1086–1112)
- John III (1112–1128)
- Hildebrand (1129–1140)
- Andrew (1140–1144)
- Albert I (1144–1154)
- Albert II (1154–1178)
- Boniface (1179–1201)
- Raymond (1201–1250)
- Cirsacco (1250–1255)
- Buonaccorso (1255–1262)
- Landulf II (1263–1275)
- Guido (1286–1309)
- Nicolò Baratti (1309–1329)
- Bernard (1330–1334)
- William (1337–1347)
- Federick (1347–1348)
- Deodatus (1348–1356)
- Louis (1357–1361)
- Ademar (1363–1369)
- Tommaso de' Marzapesci (1369–1385)
- Nicolò d'Assisi (1386–1398)
- Battista Gozzadini (1398–1400)
- Delfino Gozzadini (1400–1405)
- Giangaleazzo Pepoli (1407–1449)

=== Commendatory abbots ===
- Gurone d'Este (1449–1484)
- Giuliano Della Rovere (1485–1503)
- Galeotto Franciotti della Rovere (1503–1505)
- Giuliano Cesarini (1505–1510)
- Gianmatteo Sertorio (1510–1516)
- Gianjacopo Sertorio (1516–1527)
- Gianmatteo Sertorio (nuov.) (1527–1531)
- Antonio Maria Sertorio (1531–1550)
- Giulio Sertorio (1550–1560)
- Carlo Borromeo (1560–1566)
- Gianfrancesco Bonomi (1573–1582)
- Guido Luca Ferrero (1573–1582)
- Filippo Guastavillani (1582–1587)
- Girolamo Mattei (1587–1603)
- Alessandro Mattei (1603–1621)
- Ludovico Ludovisi (1621–1632)
- Antonio Barberini (1632–1671)
- Giacomo Rospigliosi (1671–1684)
- Giacomo de Angelis (1687–1695)
- Sebastiano Antonio Tanara (1695–1724)
- Alessandro Albani (1724–1779)
- Francesco Maria d'Este (1780–1821)

=== Commendatory abbots and (arch)bishops of Modena ===
- Tiburzio, marchese Cortese (1822–1828)
- Giuseppe, marchese Sommariva (1828–1830)
- Adeodato Caleffi (1830–1838)
- Luigi Reggianini (1838–1848)
- Luigi Ferrari (1848–1852)
- Francesco Emilio Cugini (1852–1872)
- Giuseppe Maria conte Guidelli (1872–1889)
- Carlo Maria Borgognoni (1889–1901)
- Natale Bruni (1901–1926)
- Giuseppe Antonio Ferdinando Bussolari (1926–1939)
- Cesare Boccoleri (1940–1956)
- Giuseppe Amici (1957–1976)
- Bruno Foresti (1976–1983)
- Bartolomeo Santo Quadri (1983–1986)

=== Archbishop–abbots of Modena–Nonantola ===
- Bartolomeo Santo Quadri (1986–1996)
- Benito Cocchi (1996–2010)
- Antonio Lanfranchi (2010–2015)
- Erio Castellucci (2015– )

== Sources ==
- (in Italian) Nonantola Abbey Official website
- (in Italian) Centro Studi Storici Nonantolani: The Saints of Nonantola
- Herbermann, Charles, ed. (1913). "Nonantola". Catholic Encyclopedia. New York: Robert Appleton Company.
