= Grasulf I of Friuli =

First Lombard King of Italy

Grasulf I (died after 575) was a nephew of Alboin, the first Lombard King of Italy, and brother of Gisulf, the first Duke of Friuli, whom he succeeded as duke sometime after 575.

A letter written by Gogo, Frankish mayor of the palace of Austrasia under Sigebert I and Childebert II, sometime between Gogo's rise to power in 571 and his death in 581 refers to Grasulf as celsitudo, which historian Walter Pohl interprets as implying that Grasulf held the office. The letter is undated and unattached to the name of either king he served. It has traditionally been assigned to around the year of his death (581), but an alternative solution put forward by Walter Goffart places it as early as 571–572 around the time of Sigebert's embassy to Constantinople. In it Gogo urges Grasulf to ally himself with the Franks, the Byzantine Empire and the Papacy to oust the infestantes (presumably the Lombards or other barbarian groups) from Italy. Ambassadors were already in Austrasia for Grasulf's reply in case winter weather delayed his response to the emperor. Historian Thomas Hodgkin says that Grasulf "...was almost certainly duke..." by the mid-580s.

Scholar Amedeo Crivellucci says one reason that Grasulf was willing to fight against his fellow Lombards, was resentment for being passed over after the death of his uncle in favor of the election of the non-related Authari as king.

If the Byzantines could resume control of northern Italy, the empire could not only rely again on Lombard mercenaries but also use Friuli to open a new front against the Avars. However, negotiations broke down and Grasulf did not align with the Franks or Byzantines. He was succeeded as Duke by his son, Grisulf II around 591.

While the exact location of Grasulf's seat of power is unknown, the letter from Gogo is, evidence that the "Friulian court" was capable of handling sophisticated imperial correspondence not long after the Lombard arrival on Italian soil.

== Sources ==
- Bachrach, Bernard S. The Anatomy of a Little War: A Diplomatic and Military History of the Gundovald Affair (568–586). Boulder, CO: Westview Press, 1994.
- Everett, Nicholas. Literacy in Lombard Italy, c. 568–774. Cambridge: Cambridge University Press, 2003. ISBN 0-521-81905-9.
- Hodgkin, Thomas (1916). Italy and her Invaders vol. 7. Clarendon Press.
- Goffart, Walter (1957). "Byzantine Policy in the West under Tiberius II and Maurice: The Pretenders Hermenegild and Gundovald (579–585)". Traditio. 13: 73–118. doi:10.1017/S0362152900007935.
- Nelson, Janet L. "Queens as Jezebels: Brunhild and Balthild in Merovingian History." Medieval Women: Essays Dedicated and Presented to Professor Rosalind M. T. Hill, ed. D. Baker. Studies in Church History: Subsidia, vol. 1 (Oxford: Blackwell, 1978), pp. 31–77. Reprinted in Politics and Ritual in Early Medieval Europe. London: Hambledon Press, 1986. ISBN 0-907628-59-1.
