= Ado of Friuli =

Ado (or Ato) (died 695) was the Duke of Friuli after the usurper Ausfrid was defeated at Verona in 694. According to Paul the Deacon, he was a brother of the former duke Rodoald and ruled for a year and seven months. The actual length of his reign is disputed, as is the year of its occurrence. He appears with the title loci servator (caretaker) and may have only held the duchy as regent on behalf of the king.

A certain Ado fought with Raginpert against Liutpert in 702, but the identification of this duke with Ado of Friuli is disputable.

== Sources ==
- Paul the Deacon. Historia Langobardorum. Translated by William Dudley Foulke. University of Pennsylvania: 1907.
- Hodgkin, Thomas. Italy and her Invaders. Clarendon Press: 1895.

Preceded by Ansfrid	Duke of Friuli	Succeeded by Ferdulf
