= Dukes and margraves of Friuli =

Frankish rulers in the MIddle Ages

The dukes and margraves of Friuli were the rulers of the Duchy and March of Friuli in the Middle Ages.

The dates given below, when contentious, are discussed in the articles of the respective dukes.

== Lombard dukes ==
- 568–c.584 Gisulf I, nephew of King Alboin
- 568/c.584–590 Grasulf I brother of Gisulf
- 590–610 Gisulf II, son of Grasulf I
- 610–617 Tasso, son of Gisulf II
- 610–617 Kakko, brother of Tasso
- 617–651 Grasulf II, brother of Gisulf II
- 651–663 Ago
- 663–666 Lupus
- 666 Arnefrid, son of Lupus
- 666–678 Wechtar
- 678–??? Landar
- ???–694 Rodoald
- 694 Ansfrid
- 694–705 Ado
- 705 Ferdulf
- 705–706 Corvulus
- 706–739 Pemmo
- 739–744 Ratchis, also king of the Lombards
- 744–749 Aistulf, also king of the Lombards
- 749–751 Anselm (d.806)
- 751–774 Peter
- 774–776 Hrodgaud

== Carolingian appointees ==
=== Dukes ===
- 776–787 Marcarius
- 789–799 Eric
- 799–808 Hunfrid
- 808–817 Aio
- 817–819 Cadalaus
- 819–828 Balderic

=== Margraves ===
- 846–863 Eberhard (also dux Foroiuli)
- 863–874 Unroch III
- 874–890 Berengar, also Holy Roman Emperor
- 891–896 Walfred
- 896–924 Berengar, also Holy Roman Emperor
- 924–966 Berengar II

=== Duke of First French Empire ===
- 14 November 1808–23 May 1813 Géraud Duroc
- 28 October 1813–24 September 1829 Hortense Duroc
