= Leo II =

Leo II (or Leon II) may refer to:

== People ==
- Leo II (emperor), Byzantine emperor who reigned from January 18 to November 17, 474
- Pope Leo II, pope from August 682 to July 683
- Leon II of Abkhazia (767/68–811/12)
- Leo II (archbishop of Ravenna) (d. 1001)
- Leo II (1150–1219), King of Armenia, sometimes referred to as Leo I, King of Armenia or Levon I of Armenia, initially known as Prince Leo II
- Leo II, King of Armenia (1236–1289), sometimes also referred to as Leo III
- Leo II of Halych (d. 1323)

== Other ==
- Leo II (dwarf galaxy), a dwarf galaxy discovered in 1950
- LEO II (computer), an early commercial programmable computer
- Leo II (theorem prover), an automated theorem prover
- Leopard 2, a German battle tank
