= Gisulf I of Friuli =

First Duke of Friuli

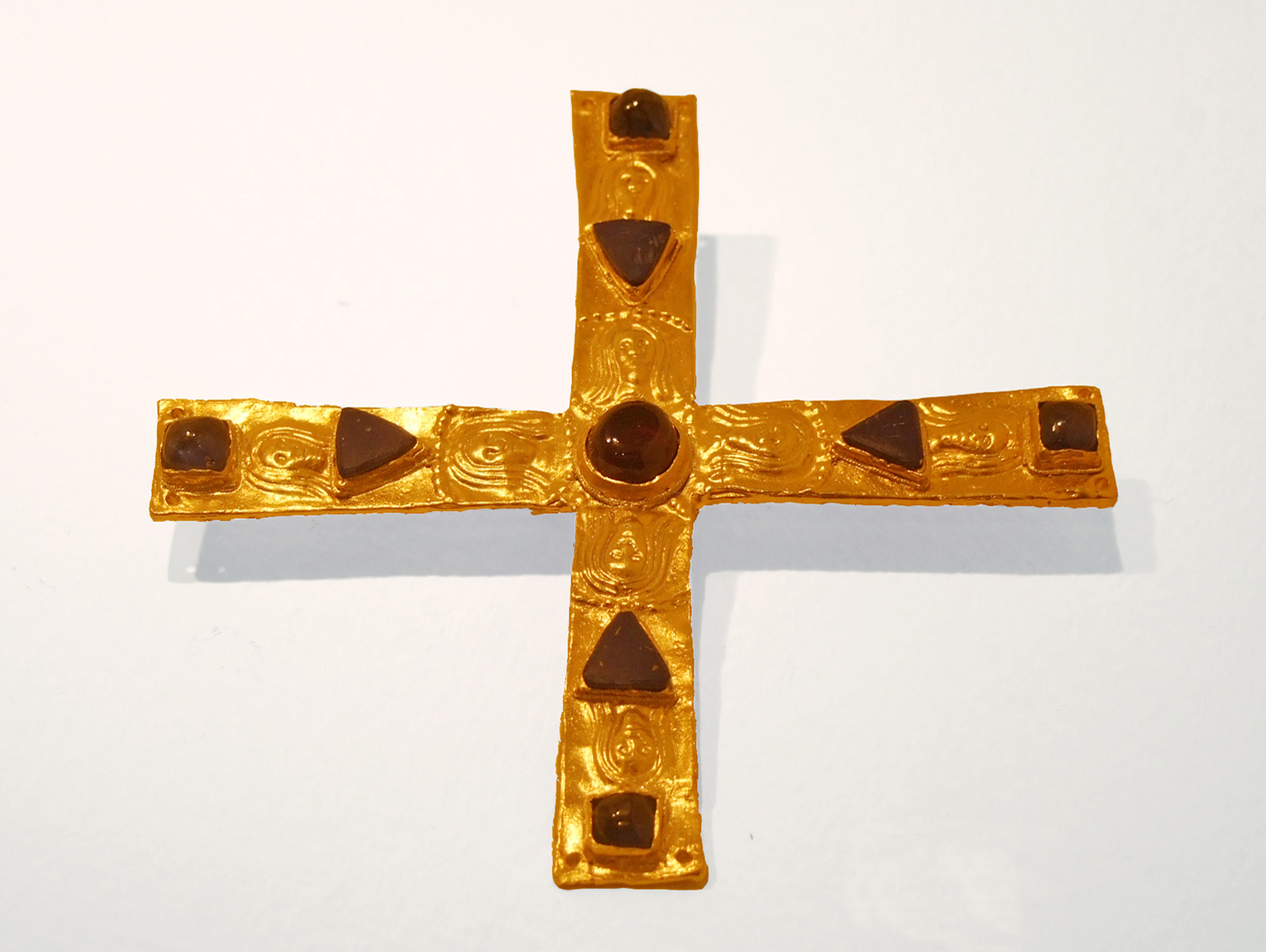
This cross has traditionally been linked to Gisulf.

Gisulf I (Latin: Gisulfus I) was probably the first duke of Friuli (then Forum Julii). He was a nephew of Alboin, first king of the Lombards in Italy, who appointed him duke around 569 after the Lombard conquest of the region.

Before this, Gisulf had been Alboin's marpahis or "master of the horse", sometimes considered a shield-bearer. He was, according to Paul the Deacon, "a man suitable in every way." He asked Alboin for permission to choose which faras or clans he would lead or rule over in Friuli, and this request was granted. He thus chose which families would settle permanently in Friuli, and he "acquired the honour of a leader (ducior)." As riders would need to patrol the Venetian plain and bring swift news of any approaching foes, Alboin also granted him a great herd of brood mares of strength and endurance.

He reigned during the Rule of the Dukes from 575 to 585. He was succeeded by his nephew, Gisulf II.

== Sources ==
- Paul the Deacon. Historia Langobardorum. Available at Northvegr.
- Andreas Bergomatis. Chronicon at the Institut für Mittelalter Forschung.

Preceded by none	Duke of Friuli c. 569 – c. 590	Succeeded by Gisulf II
