= Ansfrid of Nonantola =

Ansfrid (fl. 825–837) was the third abbot of Nonantola. He greatly enriched his abbey, providing it with a chalice and Gospel Books.

Ansfrid succeeded Peter between 821 and 825. Later abbatial records, from 1037–45, date his consecration to 821, but documents from 824 name Peter as abbot. Ansfrid first appears as abbot unequivocally in 825.

In September 828 Louis the Pious received ambassadors from the Byzantine Empire. Responsively he sent Ansfrid and Halitgar, Bishop of Cambrai, to Constantinople as ambassadors with legatine authority.

Ansfrid is not mentioned after 837 and he was succeeded by Ratpert.

== Sources ==
- Pratesi, Alessandro (1960). "Ansfrido". Dizionario Biografico degli Italiani, Volume 1: Aaron–Albertucci (in Italian). Rome: Istituto dell'Enciclopedia Italiana. ISBN 978-8-81200032-6.
