= Cadolah of Friuli =

Cadolah (or Cadalaus) (also Cadolach, Chadalhoh or Chadolah) (died 819) was the Duke of Friuli from 817 to his death. He was a son of Count Berthold (Pera[h]told) and an Ahalolfinger.

He was a patron of the monastery of Saint Gall. With his brother Uuago, he donated property in the village of Wanga to the monastery by charter dated 23 October 805. He also donated property on 17 November 817, at which time he bore the title "count" (comis) and directed his son, Berthold, to make donations in his name after his death.

By then, he had been put in charge of Dalmatia, where he was the local ruler at the time when an embassy from Constantinople passed through on their way to the court of Louis the Pious (816). Sometimes after that, probably in 817, he was created Duke of Friuli. Einhard calls him Cadolaum comitem et marcæ Foroiuliensis præfectum ("Cadolah, count and prefect of the Friulian march") in 818. Einhard later calls him dux Foroiuliensis when recording his death after returning from a campaign against Ljudevit Posavski in 819. According to the Vita Hludowici imperatoris, Cadolah was replaced by Baldric.

Historians often identified Cadolah with Kotzil mentioned in De Administrando Imperio's account, "The Croats, unable to endure such treatment from the Franks, revolted from them, and slew those of them whom they had for archontes. Because of this, a large army from Francia marched against them, and after they had fought one another for seven years, at last, and with hardship, the Croats managed to prevail and killed all the Franks and their archon, called Kotzil".

== Sources ==
- Thegan of Trier. Vita Hludowici Imperatoris.
- Einhard. Life of Charlemagne .

Preceded by Aio	Duke of Friuli; 817–819	Succeeded by Baldric
