= Wechtar of Friuli =

Lombard noble, Duke of Friuli

Wechtar (or Wechthari), a Lombard from Vicenza, was the Duke of Friuli from 666 to 678. He took control of Friuli at the command of King Grimoald following the rebellion of Lupus and Arnefrit and the invasion of the Avars. According to Paul the Deacon, he was a mild and fair ruler.

Soon after Grimoald pacified the region, Wechtar was appointed duke. Soon after his appointment, he travelled to Pavia and, while he was away, the Slavs, formerly allies of Arnefrit, invaded his duchy. They intended to take Forum Julii (modern Cividale) and camped at Boxas, the location of which remains uncertain. Some have put it at Purgessimus, some at Prosascus near the source of the Natisone (Natisio), still others at Borgo Bressana, and finally, and most definitively, near Brischis just outside the city. Paul relates that Wechtar had just returned from Pavia at the same time when he heard of their encampment and marched against them with twenty five men. At a bridge over the Natisone, Wechtar met them and, again according to Paul, defeated them in a route. The historical accuracy of Paul's account has, on the basis of its outrageous numbers, been called into question.

Wechtar died and was succeeded by Landari.

Preceded by Arnefrit	Duke of Friuli; 666–678	Succeeded by Landari
