= Anselm, Duke of Friuli =

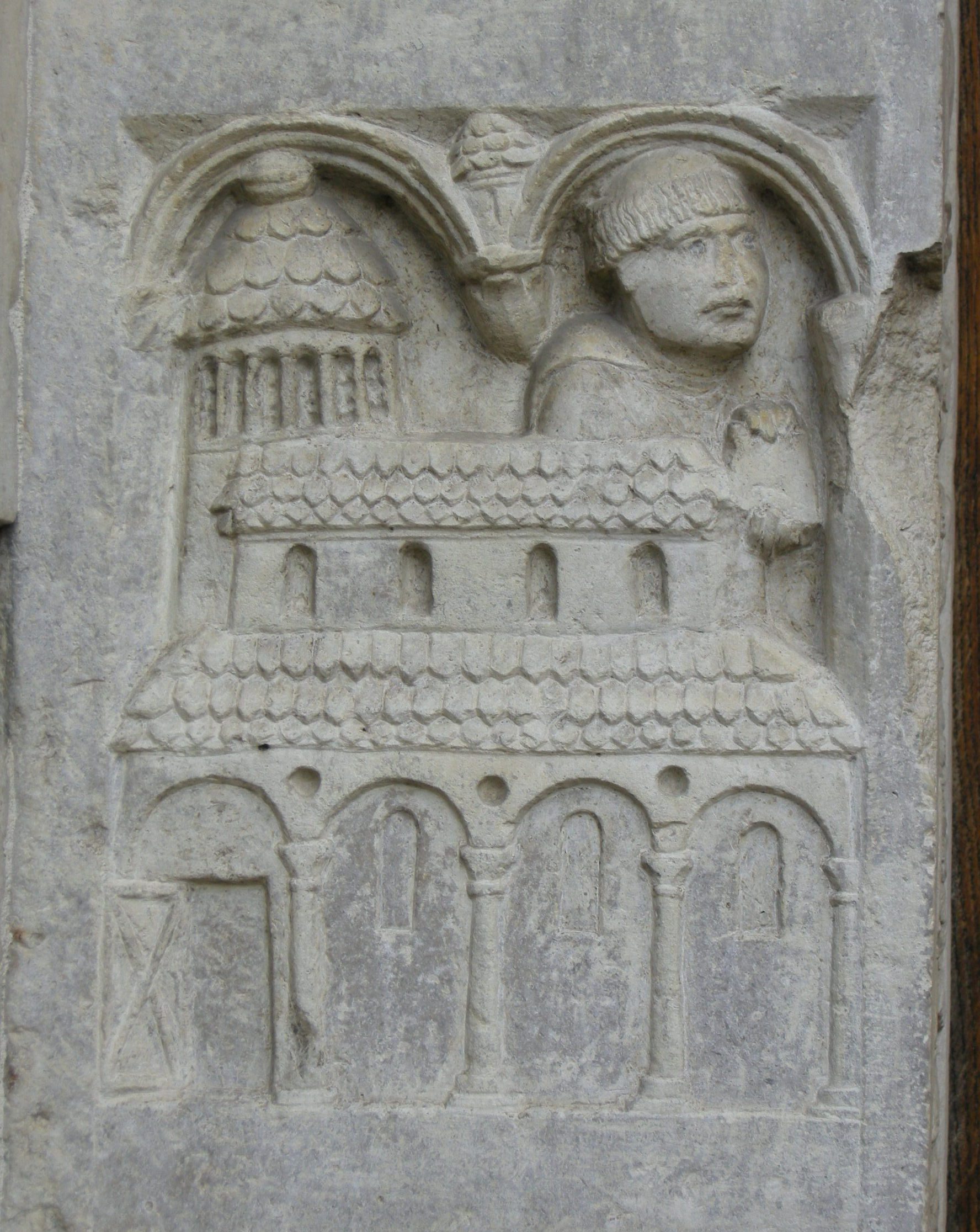
Anselm, from a 12th-century sculpture by Wiligelmo

Anselm (died 805) was the Lombard duke of Friuli (749–751) and the founding abbot of the monastery of Nonantula.

== Life ==
He left the world at the height of his secular career, and in 750 built a monastery at Fanano, a place given to him by Aistulf, King of the Lombards, who had married Anselm's sister Gisaltruda. Two years later, he built the monastery of Nonantula, a short distance northeast of Modena, which Aistulf endowed. Anselm went to Rome, where Pope Stephen III invested him with the habit of Saint Benedict, gave him some relics of Saint Sylvester, and appointed him Abbot of Nonantula. Anselm founded numerous hospices in which the poor and the sick were sheltered and cared for by monks.

According to the twelfth-century Catalogus abbatum nonantulorum, a list of abbots of Nonantola with their histories, Desiderius, who succeeded Aistulf as King of the Lombards in 756, banished Anselm from Nonantula in favor of his own protégé. Anselm spent the seven years of his exile at the Benedictine monastery of Monte Cassino, but returned to Nonantula after Desiderius was taken prisoner by Charlemagne in the war of 774. This exile is not mentioned in the earlier Vita Anselmi, a biography of Anselm written one or two hundred years after his death.

Having been abbot for fifty years, Anselm died at Nonantula in 805, where the commune still honors him as patron. His feast day is 3 March.

== Sources ==
- Paul the Deacon. Historia Langobardorum.

Preceded by Aistulf	Duke of Friuli; 749–751	Succeeded by Peter
