= Aio of Friuli =

Aio or Haio (died after 811) was the probable Duke of Friuli between the death of Eric (799) and the appointment of Cadolah (817). He may have been preceded by another possible duke, Hunfrid, who died circa 808. Though he is not found as a duke in any contemporary or later sources, from his power in the region, he is surmised to have exercised the ducal authority during a period when no other duke is known.

Aio was first granted land in the Duchy of Friuli by Charlemagne on 2 February 799. Charlemagne later confirmed the division of this property between Aio's sons on 7 July 809: the eldest son, Alboin or Albuin, received Friuli and Vicenza; the second, Ingobert, received land in Vicenza; and the youngest, Agisclaf, received Verona. Aio's holdings were extensive and his grants to his sons had to be confirmed by the emperor himself.

According to both Einhard and the Annales Fuldenses, Charlemagne sent Haido, Bishop of Basel, Hugh, Count of Tours, and Aio as missi dominici to meet emissaries from Constantinople and confirm the Pax Nicephori in 811.

== Notes ==
| Preceded by Hunfrid | Duke of Friuli; 808? – 817? | Succeeded by Cadolah |
