= Corvulus of Friuli =

Corvulus (also Corvolus) was the Duke of Friuli for a brief spell in the early eighth century AD (c. 705 or 706). Virtually nothing is known about his origin and life; he replaced Ferdulf, but he apparently offended King Aripert II and was arrested and had his eyes gouged out. He "lived ignominiously" in shame as an obscure, blind exile thereafter, according to Paul the Deacon. He was ultimately replaced by Pemmo.

== Name ==
"Corvulus" literally means "little raven" in Latin, so this may have been a hypocoristic or Latinization for the duke's real birth name (as a likely ethnic Lombard who assimilated to Italo-Roman culture as many like him; cf. Rabanus Maurus, the first name from Old High German raban).

== Sources ==
- Paulus Diaconus. Historia Langobardorum. Translated by William Dudley Foulke. University of Pennsylvania: 1907.
- Hodgkin, Thomas. Italy and her Invaders. Clarendon Press: 1895.

Preceded by Ferdulf	Duke of Friuli; 705	Succeeded by Pemmo
