= Landar of Friuli =

Landar, Landari, or Laudari(s) was the Duke of Friuli following Wechthari in 678. He himself died before 694, when Rodoald appears as his successor.

Preceded by Wechtar	Duke of Friuli; 678–???	Succeeded by Rodoald
