= Pemmo of Friuli =

Pemmo (or Penno) was the Duke of Friuli for twenty-six years, from about 705 to his death. He was the son of Billo of Belluno.

Pemmo came to the duchy at a time when a recent civil war had ravaged the land. Pemmo raised all the children of the many nobles killed in the war in his own household next to his own sons. He also waged three wars with the Slavs of Carinthia. He defeated them so utterly the third time, that they entered into a peace treaty.

Pemmo also quarrelled with Callistus, Patriarch of Aquileia. The patriarch was at odds with the bishop of Cividale and removed him. Pemmo, in response, arrested the patriarch. For this, King Liutprand descended on Friuli and appointed Ratchis, Pemmo's son, in his place. Pemmo fled with his followers, but his son secured his pardon. Pemmo left two other sons by Ratperga: Ratchait and Aistulf, who became king.

== Sources ==
- Paul the Deacon. Historia Langobardorum.

Preceded by Corvulus	Duke of Friuli c. 706 – 739	Succeeded by Ratchis
