= Leo II (archbishop of Ravenna) =

Leo II (died 14 July 1005) was the archbishop of Ravenna from 999 to 1001. Prior to that he was the abbot of Santi Bonifacio ed Alessio on the Aventine Hill in Rome (981–997) and the abbot of Nonantola (997–998). He was a frequent papal legate after 992 and was deeply involved in the disputed election to the archdiocese of Reims. Amidst this dispute, he wrote a letter defending papal authority. Later, as archbishop, he wrote a defence of cenobitism. He spent his final years in retirement in Santi Bonifacio ed Alessio after suffering a stroke.

== Life ==
=== Abbot ===
Leo became the second abbot of Santi Bonifacio ed Alessio in 981, succeeding Sergius of Damascus. The monastery, which followed the Benedictine rule, was a meeting place of East and West, with a complement of Basilian monks as well. In 984, the Roman patrician Crescentius I entered Santi Bonifacio to die a monk. Although the abbey had originally been dedicated only to San Bonifacio, between 984 and 987 it added a dedication to Saint Alexis, whose cult had been introduced to Rome by Sergius. Bishop Adalbert of Prague, when forced from his diocese in 990–992 and 994–996, took refuge as a monk in Santi Bonifacio ed Alessio. In the Vita prior, the earliest biography of Adalbert, Leo is praised as "simple, a friend of the Psalms and always ready to preach".

During the reign of Pope Benedict VII, who died in 983, James, a priest from Carthage, arrived in Rome with a letter form his fellow clergy declaring his election as archbishop of Carthage and requesting the pope to consecrate him. James stayed at Santi Bonifacio ed Alessio while in Rome and Leo examined his theology for orthodoxy.

=== Legate ===
Leo travelled across the Alps three times on papal business. Each time he was unsuccessful. The story of these legations is told in detail in the Histories of Richer of Reims. His first mission took place in 992. In the autumn of 991, Pope John XV tasked him and Bishop Dominic of Sabina with arbitrating a dispute over the archdiocese of Reims. He tried unsuccessfully to arrange a meeting between the two claimants, Arnulf and Gerbert of Aurillac, but was opposed by the West Frankish kings, Hugh and Robert II. He called a synod for 27 March 992 in Aachen, but it never happened because of West Frankish opposition. He insisted that Hugh and his bishops come to Rome, but was refused.

In the spring of 993, John XV dispatched Leo north again to negotiate a resolution, but nothing is known of his doings over the next two years. In early 995, in another effort to resolve the schism, John again appointed Leo legate to Francia, but it is unclear if he had returned to Rome or if he had been in the north since 993. The pope ordered Leo and Archbishop Seguin of Sens to convene a new synod, to confirm Arnulf and to depose Gerbert. The synod was to be composed of bishops from both East Francia and West Francia. At Easter 995, Leo met with the Emperor Otto III in Aachen. The Synod of Mouzon met on 2 June. The West Frankish kings refused to attend and forbade their bishops from attending. At Mouzon, Leo rejected Gerbert's defence of the deposition of Arnulf. Leo subsequently negotiated directly with Hugh and Robert without success. A meeting of bishops attended by both Gerbert and Arnulf was held in either Reims or Senlis on 1 July, with Leo in attendance. The follow-up Synod of Ingelheim on 5 February 996 was unsuccessful. Leo's legation was not a complete failure for himself. On 31 May 996, he obtained from Otto III confirmation of his monastery's properties within the city of Rome in one of Otto's earliest acts as secular ruler of Rome.

The Reims schism was only finally resolved at the Synod of Pavia in February 997. A papal schism opened up early in 997, when John Philagathos was elected at Rome with the support of the Roman patrician Crescentius II in opposition to Pope Gregory V. Around March, Otto III deposed Philagathos from the abbey of Nonantola and bestowed it on Leo. The Catalogi abbatum Nonantulanorum places the start of his abbacy in 996, which is off by a year, and gives him an abbacy of two years. Gregory V had sent by Leo to the court of Otto III that spring to dissuade the emperor from campaigning against the Lutici and persuade him to continue with his planned trip to Italy. Leo brought, as a gift for Otto, a deluxe illuminated manuscript of a poem by Abbo of Fleury. Otto, however, went ahead with his eastern campaign.

Otto III sent Leo back on a mission of his own in the autumn of 997. Leo went to Pavia, where Gregory V was staying, to request that Gregory meet Otto on his way to Italy and to intercede on behalf of Gerbert of Aurillac. Gregory, however, did not leave Pavia.

By October 998, Leo had been succeeded at Nonantola by a certain John. To Leo's brief abbacy can be attributed a story told in the Translatio et miracula sanctorum Senesii et Theopontii. A drought was ended when the abbot took the bones of the martyrs Senesius and Theopompus and marched them around the walls of the monastery for three days. A song in honour of Senesius and Theopompus found in a manuscript of Nonantola's library was probably introduced there by Leo.

=== Archbishop ===
Leo succeeded Gerbert of Aurillac as archbishop of Ravenna sometime before September 999 after Gerbert was elected pope in April. The earliest evidence of Leo as archbishop is an imperial diploma issued on 27 September 999, in which Otto expanded the archbishop's temporal powers and placed certain Adriatic counties under his authority. The Deeds of the Bishops of Cambrai preserves an edict the Emperor Otto III granted to Bishop Erluin of Cambrai confirming the immunity of the episcopal possession of Le Cateau and its fortress "because of the intercession of Bishop Leo", who is probably Leo II of Ravenna. The latest document to mention him as archbishop is dated 20 July 1001.

In 1014, following a synodal judgement, Pope Benedict VIII deposed two bishops who had been consecrated by Leo. Thietmar of Merseburg, who records the incident, does not expressly state why, but notes that the same synod renewed prohibitions on bishops who had not attained canonical age.

According to Peter Damian, Leo suffered a stroke that left him paralyzed and unable to speak. He therefore resigned the archbishopric and retired to his Aventine monastery, where he lived another four years, dying on 14 July 1005. Damian, in a letter to Pope Nicholas II, seems elsewhere to allude to Leo when he describes an elderly and mystical monk who, after two years as abbot of Nonantola, wished to retire to Santi Bonifacio ed Alessio.

== Works ==
Two writings by Leo are known:

- Epistola ad Hugonem et Robertum regem
- Admonitio ad Durantem monachum

Start of the letter to Hugh and Robert

Leo wrote the Epistola ad Hugonem et Robertum regem—more fully, Leonis abbatis et legati ad Hugonem et Robertum reges epistola—in connection with his mission to end the Reims schism. It is a letter addressed to Kings Hugh and Robert and an important source for the causes of the schism. Teta Moehs dates it to Leo's first legation. Marco Cristini also places it in 993. Gianluca Borhese and Jason Glenn date it to 995. Borghese argues that it was only at the Synod of Mouzon that Leo saw, through Gerbert, a copy of the acts of the Synod of Verzy of 991, at which Arnulf was deposed. The letter is a response to what Leo saw as the errors of Verzy.

The letter is a response to Hugh's claim that the pope's did not exercise jurisdiction over ecclesiastical affairs in Spain and Africa and so neither should he in Gaul. Leo admits that John XV's freedom of action is severely restricted by Crescentius II, yet he makes extensive use of the papal archive to prove Hugh wrong. He cites the recent arrival of envoys from the churches of Egypt, Jerusalem and Spain and quotes the letter from the archdiocese of Carthage. There is some debate about how faithfully he quotes the letter. He concludes "that the Roman Church is still honoured and revered by all the Churches, and only by you is it reviled and dishonoured." His argument, however, takes an anti-intellectual turn:

You are the Antichrists, who say that the Apostolic Church is governed by an inert statue, by an idol resembling those of the pagans. . . Because the vicars of the blessed Peter and his disciples study other masters than Plato, Virgil, Terence, and the rest of that troop of philosophers ... you conclude that they are not worthy of being promoted to the ranks of doormen because they ignore the poets?

Written while Leo was archbishop, the Admonitio ad Durantem monachum is an admonition addressed to some monks who had abandoned the cenobitic life (community) to become hermits (solitaries). Leo complains about the spread of hermits and defends the value of the Benedictine rule, while admitting, "What else is a monastery but a prison?" The Admonitio is a testament to what some have called the "crisis of cenobitism" in western Europe in the 11th century. It is published in the Italia Sacra.

== Bibliography ==
- Althoff, Gerd (2003) [1996]. Otto III. Translated by Phyllis G. Jestice. Pennsylvania State University Press.
- Bachrach, Bernard S.; Bachrach, David S.; Leese, Michael, eds. (2018). Deeds of the Bishops of Cambrai: Translation and Commentary. Routledge.
- Borghese, Gianluca (2005). "Leone". Dizionario Biografico degli Italiani (in Italian). Vol. 64: Latilla–Levi Montalcini. Rome: Istituto dell'Enciclopedia Italiana. ISBN 978-88-12-00032-6.
- Brown, Nancy Marie (2010). The Abacus and the Cross: The Story of the Pope Who Brought the Light of Science to the Dark Ages. Basic Books.
- Cerami, Domenico (2017). Il colto e l'incolto: L'abate Rodolfo I (1002–1035) e l'abbazia di Nonantola. Edizioni Il Fiorino.
- Constable, Giles (2008). "Metaphors for Religious Life in the Middle Ages" (PDF). Revue Mabillon. n.s. 19: 231–242.
- Cristini, Marco (2025). The Years of the Infidels: African Latin Christianity from the Vandals to the Almohads. Taylor & Francis.
- Glenn, Jason (2004). Politics and History in the Tenth Century: The Work and World of Richer of Reims. Cambridge University Press.
- Lake, Justin, ed. (2011). Histories: Richer of Saint-Rémi. Vol. II: Books 3–4. Harvard University Press.
- Leclercq, Jean (1971). "The Monastic Crisis of the Eleventh and Twelfth Centuries". In Noreen Hunt (ed.). Cluniac Monasticism in the Central Middle Ages: Readings in European History. Palgrave Macmillan.
- Leclercq, Jean; Vandenbroucke, François; Bouyer, Louis (1968) [1961]. The Spirituality of the Middle Ages. The Seabury Press.
- Moehs, Teta E. (1972). Gregorius V, 996–999: A Biographical Study. Stuttgart: Anton Hiersemann.
- Warner, David A., ed. (2001). Ottonian Germany: The Chronicon of Thietmar of Merseburg. Manchester University Press.
- West, Charles (2025). Europe in the Eleventh Century: Beyond Revolution and Reform. Oxford University Press.
- West-Harling, Veronica (2020). Rome, Ravenna, and Venice, 750–1000: Byzantine Heritage, Imperial Present, and the Construction of City Identity. Oxford University Press.
- Wickham, Chris (2015). Medieval Rome: Stability and Crisis of a City, 900–1150. Oxford University Press.
- Zimmermann, Harald (1966). "Abt Leo an König Hugo Capet" (PDF). Innsbrucker Beiträge zur Kulturwissenschaft. 12: 327–344.

Catholic Church titles
Preceded by Sergius of Damascus	Abbot of Santi Bonifacio ed Alessio; 981–997	Succeeded by John Canaparius
Preceded by John I	Abbot of Nonantola; 997–999	Succeeded by John II
Preceded by Gerbert	Archbishop of Ravenna; 999–1001	Succeeded by Frederick
