= Baldric of Friuli =

Baldric or Balderic (Bald[e]ricus) was the Duke of Friuli (dux Foroiuliensis) from 819, when he replaced Cadolah according to Thegan of Trier in his Vita Hludowici imperatoris, until 828, when he was removed from office as the last Duke of Friuli.

Baldric was an imperial legate in 815, when he crossed into Zealand with an army of Saxons and Abotrites to restore the deposed King of Denmark, Harald Klak.

As ruler of Friuli, Baldric continued Cadolah's war against Ljudevit Posavski (Liudovitus), the Pannonian Croat leader, successfully expelling him from imperial territory. In 826, Baldric and Count Gerold also waged war on the Bulgars under the orders of Bertric, the count of the palace.

In 826, together with George, the presbyter of Venice, he escorted a hydraulic organ to Aachen.

In 828, Baldric was removed from Friuli for his failure to have mounted an effective defense against the Bulgars during their invasion of 827, and the dukedom was divided into four counties. Eventually, the counties would be united under a marchio (margrave), but the duchy would never be restored.

== Sources ==
- Thegan of Trier. Vita Hludowici Imperatoris.
- Einhard. Life of Charlemagne.
- Annales Fuldenses translated by Timothy Reuter, with commentary (subscription needed).
- Annales Regni Francorum -

Preceded by Cadolah	Duke of Friuli; 819–828	Vacant Title next held by Unruoch II as Margrave of Friuli
