= Rodoald of Friuli =

Rodoald or Rodwald (died 694) was the Duke of Friuli following Landar in the late seventh century. The precise dates of his reign cannot be known.

In 694, Rodoald was attacked by Ansfrid and fled to Istria, whence he took ship at Ravenna to the court of Cunipert in Pavia.

Preceded by Landar	Duke of Friuli until 694	Succeeded by Ansfrid
