= Hunfrid of Istria =

Hunfrid (Latin: Unfredus) was the Margrave of Istria and, according to some sources, Duke of Friuli from 799 to c. 804, when a Duke John was ruling Istria. He was the founder of the family called the Hunfridings.

Hunfrid first appears in Istria as marchio in 799, the same year that Eric of Friuli died. He was probably an Aleman, although the historian of early medieval Raetia, Elizabeth Meyer-Marthaler, considered him of Frankish origin. He was the count of Rhaetia in 806 and 808. A record of his presiding over a public court at Rankweil in his capacity as count of Rhaeta (Reciarum comis) survives. He interrogated witnesses, ordered boundaries of a disputed property walked out, ordered judges (scabini) to make a finding and issued a verdict in writing. The surviving record describes him as a vir illustris.

Based on his presence in a list of personages in the libri memoriales of Reichenau and Sankt Gallen, he is presumed to have married Hitta (Hidda), an Udalriching and probably the niece or granddaughter of Gerold of Anglachgau and thus a cousin or niece of Hunfrid's predecessor in Italy, Eric. Based on the same memorial books, he is probably the father of Adalbert, his successor in Rhaetia, Odalric, who became Count of Barcelona in another part of the Empire, and Hunfrid II, who became dux super Redicam (duke over Rhaetia) and father of the later Hunfriding Dukes of Swabia.

Preceded by Eric	Duke of Friuli; 799? – 808?	Succeeded by Aio
