= Marcarius of Friuli =

Marcarius was the Duke of Friuli from 776 to 787. He was the first Friulian duke appointed by Charlemagne after the rebellion of the Lombard Hrodgaud. He was probably not a Lombard. He played a minor part in the Schism of the Three Chapters.

When the bishop of Istria, Maurice, was arrested and his eyes gouged out by the Byzantine authorities for allegedly stirring up the populace to desert Byzantium for the Frankish Empire, Pope Hadrian I received him in Rome before sending him to the court of Marcarius in Friuli. Hadrian also sent a letter to Charlemagne asking him to send Marcarius against Byzantine Istria to reinstall Maurice in his see.

Marcarius was succeeded by Eric, a faithful of Charlemagne.

== Sources ==
- Hodgkin, Thomas. Italy and her Invaders. Clarendon Press: 1895.

Preceded by Hrodgaud	Duke of Friuli; 776–787	Succeeded by Eric
