= Ferdulf of Friuli =

Ferdulf or Fardulf, originally from the territories of Liguria, was Duke of Friuli at some point between the reign of Cuninpert (688-700) and Aripert II (701-12). No evidence associates his tenure specifically with the year 705, nor is there any induction that it was brief.

Paul the Deacon described him as “a tricky and conceited man” Ferdulf was said to have desired "the glory of a victory over the slaves".

To achieve this, he paid Slavs to invade his country so that he might defeat them. However, part of the Slav force instead raided pastureland and carried off livestock as booty. Argait, whose name in Langobardic means "cowardly", "inert", or "worthless", was the local magistrate (sculdahis) tasked with pursuing them, but he failed to overtake the raiders.

When Ferdulf later asked Argait what had become of the robbers and was told they had escaped, he became enraged. Paul reports him as saying, "when could you do anything bravely, you whose name, Argait, comes from the word coward?" Argait replied that neither of them should die "until others know which of us is the greater coward".

A few days later, the main Slav army that Ferdulf had hired arrived and positioned itself on a hill. Ferdulf initially intended to engage them on level ground, but Argait charged uphill instead. To avoid appearing cowardly, Ferdulf followed. The entire Lombard cavalry was killed, and the Friulian nobility was decimated. Both Argait and Ferdulf died in the battle.

Paul notes that the exchange between Ferdulf and Argait was conducted in 'vulgaria verba', which may indicate that Langobardic was still spoken as a vernacular in northeastern Italy. Although Paul doesn't identify his source and provides no further information about Ferdulf, the account likely derives from oral traditions he encountered in Friuli.

Preceded by Ado	Duke of Friuli; 705	Succeeded by Corvulus
