= Arnefrit of Friuli =

Arnefrit, Arnefrid, Amefrit, or Amefrith was the son of Lupus of Friuli who claimed the Duchy of Friuli after his father's death in 666.

Lupus had been killed by the Avars, who had taken Cividale, seat of the duchy. Thus, King Grimoald had come into Friuli to remove the Avars and displace Arnefrit, who fled to the Slavs. He returned with Slav allies, but was defeated by Grimoald and died at the castle of Nimis. Grimoald appointed Wechtar in his place.

Preceded by Lupus	Duke of Friuli; 666	Succeeded by Wechtar
