= Ansfrid of Friuli =

Ansfrid, Ansfrit, or Ausfrid was the Duke of Friuli in 694. He was originally the lord of the castle of Ragogna.

In 694, he attacked Friuli and forced Duke Rodoald to flee to King Cunipert. Ansfrid then rebelled against the king in an attempt to make himself sovereign. He invaded Verona, but was there captured and brought before the king. He was blinded and exiled. Rodoald's brother Ado was invested in the Friulian dukedom.

== Sources ==
- Paul the Deacon. Historia Langobardorum. Translated by William Dudley Foulke. University of Pennsylvania: 1907.
- Hodgkin, Thomas. Italy and her Invaders. Clarendon Press: 1895.

| Preceded by Rodoald | Duke of Friuli; 694 | Succeeded by Ado |
