= Marepaphias =

Marepaphias (also mar(e)pahis) was a Lombard title of Germanic origin meaning "master of the horse", probably somewhat analogous to the Latin title comes stabuli or constable. According to Grimm, it came from mar or mare meaning "horse" (see modern English mare) and paizan meaning "to put on the bit".
