= Hrodgaud of Friuli =

Hrodgaud or Rodgand was the Duke of Friuli from 774 to 776. In all likelihood he was already duke under Desiderius, notwithstanding some Frankish sources, such as the Einhardis annales, who say that Charlemagne put him in power after the Siege of Pavia.

In 776, he rebelled against his lord and, according to some, declared himself king. Charlemagne, however, had been forewarned of the revolt by Pope Hadrian I, who himself had been warned in a letter by John, Patriarch of Grado. Hadrian believed that a conspiracy of Lombards and Byzantines, led by Arechis II of Benevento, Hildeprand of Spoleto, and Raginald of Clusium, was brewing against the Franks. Thus, Charles quickly crossed the Alps and defeated him, retaking Friuli and Treviso, where he spent Easter, killing Hrodgaud and replacing him with Marcarius. He placed Frankish counts in the cities of Friuli.

Preceded by Peter	Duke of Friuli; 774–776	Succeeded by Marcarius
