= Eric of Friuli =

Eighth-century duke of Friuli

Eric (also Heirichus or Ehericus; died 799) was the Duke of Friuli (dux Foroiulensis) from 789 to his death. He was the eldest son of Gerold of Anglachgau and by the marriage of his sister Hildegard the brother-in-law of Charlemagne.

== Background ==
An elegy composed by Paulinus II, Patriarch of Aquileia on the occasion of the death of his friend Eric, reveals that Eric had been born at "urbs dives Argentea", a Latin name of Frankish Strasbourg. The elegy and another work of Paulinus called the Liber Exhortationis, a work which draws from the Bible and certain Fathers of the Church to offer instruction on how to live a morally upright Christian life while carrying out secular duties, indicates that Eric was a pious Catholic. Eric was appointed to the Carolingian Duchy of Friuli in 789, about two years after the death of the previous duke, Marcarius.

== Military Campaigns ==
Eric governed the Duchy of Friuli from Cividale, the former Lombard capital and also residence of the Patriarch of Aquileia. Much of Eric's tenure as duke of Friuli was occupied by the task of subduing the nearby Avars. In this he was accompanied by Pepin of Italy and his own father, the margrave of Avaria. In 791, he and Pepin marched a Lombard army into the Drava valley and ravaged Pannonia, while Charlemagne marched along the Danube into Avar territory. Charlemagne left the campaigning to deal with a Saxon revolt in 792, while Pepin and Eric continued to assault the Avars' ring-shaped strongholds. The great Ring of the Avars, their capital fortress, was taken twice, and the booty was sent to Charlemagne in Aachen and redistributed to all his followers and even to foreign rulers, including King Offa of Mercia.

The Annales Laurissenses relate that in 795/6 Eric sent raiders into Pannonia under Vojnomir, duke of the Pannonian Croats. Meanwhile, he himself and Pepin, allied with the Western Avar tudun, led an attack which both forced the submission of the chief Avar khagan and led to the capture of the Hunorum Hringum, or Ring of the Avars, their chief camp. The khagan was taken to Aachen, where he accepted baptism with the name Theodorus. However, according to the Annales Fuldenses, Theodorus was assassinated by his own men when he returned to them.

== Final Campaign and Death ==
In 799, Eric's father died on the eve of battle with what some presumed to be the Avars. Later during the same year, Eric was on campaign in Liburnia, leading the Franks against Slavs. Some authors assume he was killed in the Battle of Trsat, even though Trsat was neither located at the coast nor having a city status at the time. According to the Frankish scholar and courtier Einhard, Eric was killed by the treachery of the Tharsatica inhabitants, but Einhard does not give any details. This is quite typical of the times that chronicles would justify lost battles by 'treason' rather than to admit defeat. The site of Eric's battle, Tarheste or Tarsatica in Latin, has been traditionally identified with Trsat, a hill fort whose ruins today overlook the city of Rijeka. However, it is more likely that the Tharsatica of Einhard's account was the civitas (Latin for "city") Tergeste on the Adriatic coast beneath the Dinaric Alps, which today would be Trieste inhabited by Slavs at the time. A year after Eric's death in 799, the Franks attacked Tharsatica again and the site of modern Trsat was actually founded by Tharsatica's surviving inhabitants a year after the siege.

== Sources ==
=== Primary ===
- Einhard. Vita Caroli Magni. translated by Samuel Epes Turner. New York: Harper & Brothers, 1880.
- Paulinus II of Aquileia. "Versus Paulini de Herico duce." In L'Oeuvre Poétique de Paulin D'Aquilée. Edited by Dag Norberg. Stockholm: Almquist and Wiskell International, 1979.

=== Secondary ===
- Hodgkin, Thomas. Italy and her Invaders. Clarendon Press: 1895.
- Ross, James Bruce. "Two Neglected Paladins of Charlemagne: Erich of Friuli and Gerold of Bavaria." Speculum, Vol. 20, No. 2. (Apr., 1945), pp 212–235.
- Wallach, Luitpold. "Alcuin on Virtues and Vices: A Manual for a Carolingian Soldier." Harvard Theological Review, Vol. 48, No. 3. (Jul., 1955), pp. 175–195.

Preceded by Marcarius	Duke of Friuli; 789–799	Succeeded by Hunfrid
