= Lupus of Friuli =

Lupus was the Duke of Friuli from between 660 and 663 to his death around 666.

Immediately after he succeeded to Friuli, Lupus invaded Grado with a body of cavalry and plundered the city, then proceeding to Aquileia, where he stole the treasures of the Patriarchate.

When King Grimoald went south to rescue his son Romuald and the Duchy of Benevento from the invasion of the Byzantine Emperor Constans II, he put Lupus in charge of Pavia. Lupus played the tyrant during Grimoald's absence, believing that the king would not return, thus was forced to flee to Cividale, seat of Friuli, and enter into rebellion when the king did come north again. Grimoald promptly asked the Khagan of the Avars to attack Friuli in order to prevent a civil war in Italy. Fighting lasted for four days at Flovius, during which Lupus held his own for three, taking much booty and slaughtering many men, before his own losses and the arrival of Avar reinforcements forced his army to retreat. He himself was killed in battle.

Lupus' son Arnefrit claimed Friuli on his father's death, but was unseated by Grimoald. Lupus' daughter Theuderada (or Theodorada) married the aforementioned Romuald. She acted as regent of Benevento for their son Gisulf.

"Lupus" literally means "Wolf" in Latin, so this may have been a Latinization for the Duke's real birth name (Wolf, Wulf, or Ulf).

== Notes ==
Preceded by Ago	Duke of Friuli; 663–666	Succeeded by Arnefrit
