= Amulet MS 5236 =

6th century BC Greek amulet

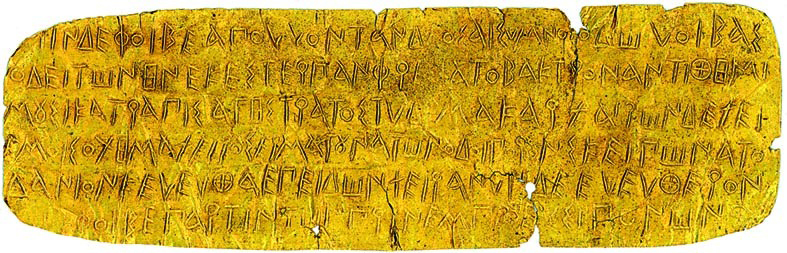
Ancient Greek amulet MS 5236 invoking the god Phoebus Apollo. Dating to the 6th century BC, the gold lamella is an early example of a block print.

MS 5236 (inventory number of the Schøyen Collection) is an ancient Greek amulet of the 6th century BC, which is unique in two respects: it is the only known magic amulet of the time inscribed with a text that was stamped as opposed to incised, and it is the only extant specimen of ephesia grammata made of gold. The only partially comprehensible inscription is an invocation of the god Phoebus Apollo and may have been composed in central Greece or western Asia Minor. As such magical amulets are known to have been mass-produced, the existence of MS 5236 indicates that, despite the singularity of the foil, an inkless block printing process was practised in ancient Greece to a certain degree, for texts of some length, beyond the examples known from Roman lead pipe inscriptions and the many types of stamps used to mark bricks and pottery with the maker's name and other details.

== Description ==
The lamella is registered under the inventory number MS 5236 by the private Norwegian Schøyen Collection, where it was studied by the British classicist Dominic Montserrat. The printing technique of the inscription was specifically analysed by the German typographer Herbert Brekle in 2010.

MS 5236 is made of a thin, rectangular gold sheet of 2.8 x 9.0 x 0.1 cm, which is inscribed on one side. The ancient Greek text comprises six lines written from left to right; margins all around the text body suggest that its contents are fully preserved. The surface of the gold foil is marked by many small creases that have grown together into cracks. Unlike later amulets, it appears to have never been rolled up or folded for personal use.

== Origin and date ==
The palaeographic analysis of the letterform indicates an early, archaic date. The script used does not clearly match any local variant of the Greek alphabet: certain letter shapes indicate an origin in Attica or Euboea, while other letters point to the ductus common in western Asia Minor, particularly that of Knidos. Overall, the comparison with other early Greek documents suggests a creation of the text in the middle of the 6th century BC.

== Inscription and use ==
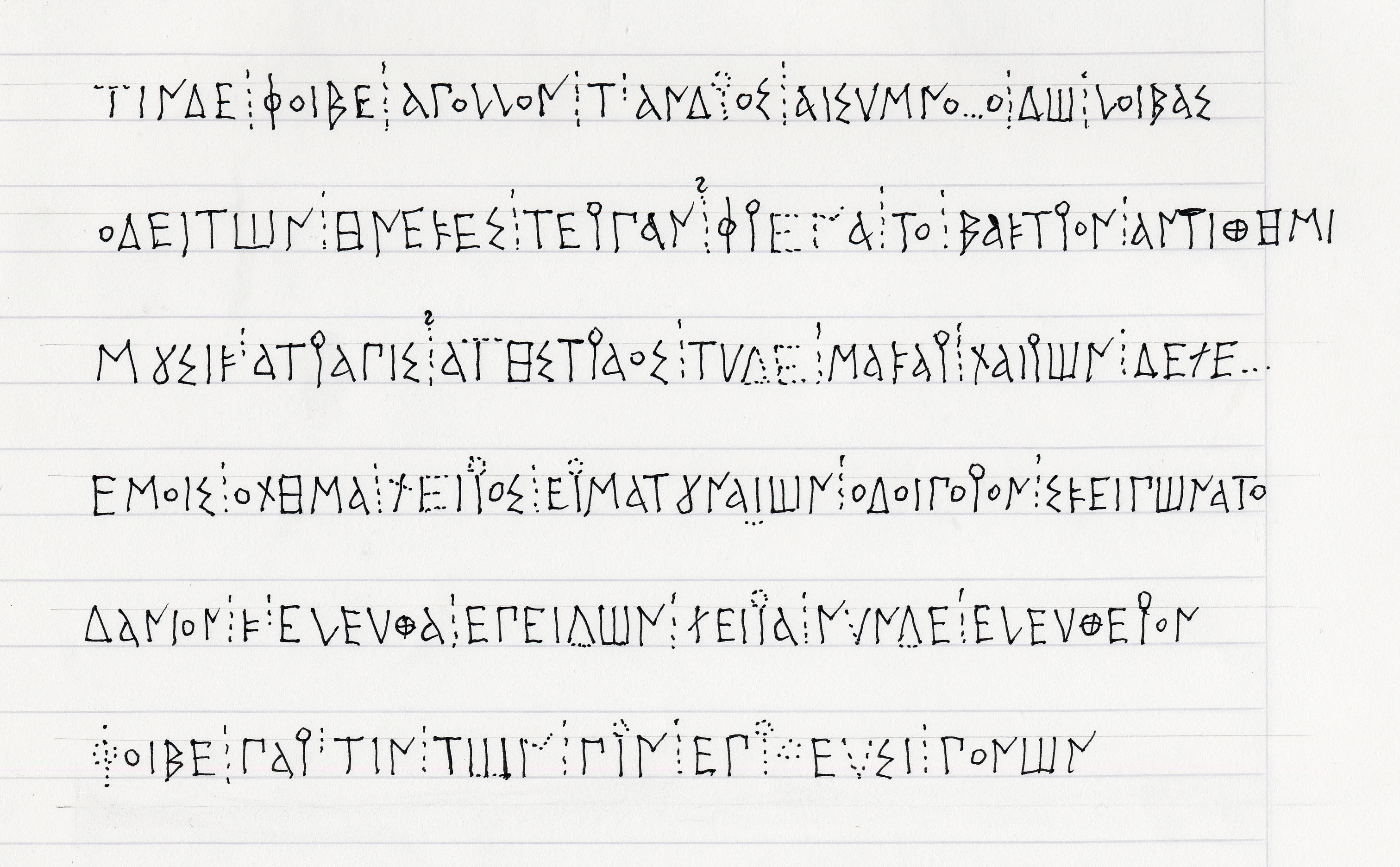
Transcribed inscription which opens with the words "O Phoebus Apollo who rules over man..."

Even though the Greek text is legible on the whole (see transcription on the right), much of it remains incomprehensible due to grammatical and syntactical peculiarities, such as they were frequent in magical amulets, and some letter sequences cannot be made any sense of. Nonetheless, one can infer from the intelligible parts that the god Phoebus Apollo is being invoked in order to raise his arms against someone or something, probably to the advantage of the amulet owner. The wording does not correspond to any other ancient epigraphic and literary texts, providing further evidence that the gold foil is genuine and not a modern forgery.

According to Montserrat, important characteristics of MS 5236 most closely correspond to the ephesia grammata, magic amulets whose incantatory words were supposedly fixed in writing on the cult statue of Artemis at Ephesus, and which were carried on the body to ward off harm. Although these metal sheets circulated in the Greek world in huge numbers, only lead examples have survived, rendering the gold foil among the ephesia grammata unique.

== Block print ==
The special significance of MS 5236 lies in the way the inscription was created. A close examination shows that a blind-stamping process was used to reproduce the Greek text on the lamella, with a single matrix carrying the whole text. In this, MS 5236 differs fundamentally from other amulets of the time, where the magic formulas were incised by hand, such as with a stylus, into the metal foil.

The entire process is reconstructed by Brekle as follows: First, the inscription's text was engraved with an iron stylus into an even copper or bronze block, with its letters facing the opposite direction and running from right to left. The displaced material rose up on both sides of the letter grooves forming two sharp, parallel ridges. In the second step, the inscribed side of the stamp block was placed on the plane gold sheet and sufficient pressure, either manually or by hammering onto a plate laid on top, was exerted from above to transmit the text. What produced the print image were the ridges caused by the material displacement; these left shallow double lines in the foil, thus creating the text. The actual, sunken letter lines were not transferred during the imprinting procedure, since they did not enter the surface of the foil.

It is the existence of these fine double grooves on the gold lamella which provides the key for identifying MS 5236 as being stamped and not written. Because it is a matter of mechanical necessity that the engraved letters appear with their raised double edges on the substrate as parallel, sunken lines when being printed, as can be observed on the amulet. Thus, the inscription is a bas-relief, which was produced by a bas-relief stamp. (Note: Montserrat, in contrast, interprets MS 5236 as a high relief, which was created by relief printing. However, this assumption is—as Brekle states (p. 2–3)—flawed in several ways, as it was beyond the technical capabilities of the time to carve out the very delicate and fragile double lines in high relief from the stamp surface. Moreover, this procedure would have needed the high-relief stamp to be pressed through the gold foil from the reverse side—a method, however, by which the letter impressions would have appeared too blurred. The only possible remedy, namely the contouring of the letters by way of a prepared pad underneath, whose bas-relief forms correlate perfectly with those of the high-relief stamp, was not technically feasible then, either. This proves Montserrat's high-relief hypothesis to be untenable.) If the text had been carved directly into the foil as with other amulets, the stylus could have left only simple lines. According to Brekle, the applied printing technique has much in common with the later method of drypoint etching, by which an image is incised into a copper plate; however, unlike drypoint, MS 5236 is a colourless blind print.

A further indication for the use of a printing technique is the varying strength of the letters, which suggests that the surface of the lamella was not completely flat during printing. Thus, the outline of the letters, as to be expected with a print, appear in the slightly more elevated regions of the sheet (darker areas in the photo), more distinct than in the slightly deeper regions (lighter areas) that were not affected by the full force of the stamp. This can be observed particularly along the folds and in the last line where the edge of the foil was apparently slightly bent downwards while being printed. Consequently, the impressions of the letters appear less marked here. If the text had been directly inscribed with a stylus into the foil, these variations would not have occurred.

Regarding the stroke order of the letters on the stamp, it can be said that the Hasta, the mostly vertical main line, was normally executed before the Coda figures.

MS 5236 is an overall rare and possibly unique print from the early Greek era. Despite this, the widespread use of magical amulets indicates that such block prints were, at least from the present prototype, mass-produced at that time.

== See also ==
- Magic in the Greco-Roman world

== Sources ==
- Brekle, Herbert E.: "Analyse der Herstellungstechnik der Inschrift auf einem Goldamulett in der Schoyen Collection (London/Oslo)", publication of the University of Regensburg, university library, August 2010
- Montserrat, Dominic: "Report on Early Greek Gold Lamella", unpublished study
