= Typography =

Art of arranging type

A specimen sheet of the Trajan typeface, which is based on the letter forms of capitalis monumentalis or Roman square capitals used for the inscription at the base of Trajan's Column, from which the typeface takes its name

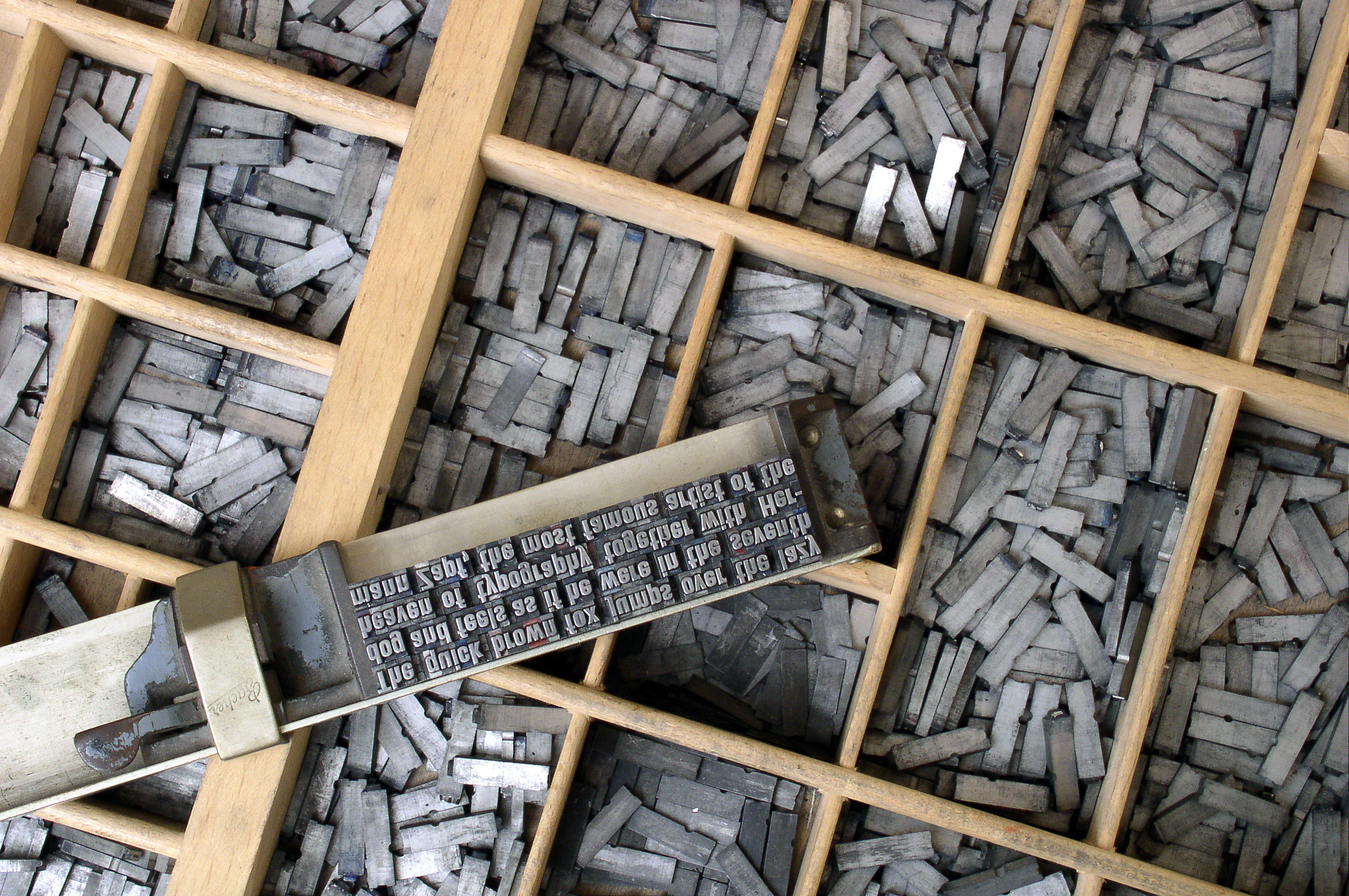
Movable type being assembled on a composing stick using pieces that are stored in the type case shown below it

Typography is the art and technique of arranging type to make written language legible and readable when displayed. The arrangement of type involves selecting typefaces, point sizes, line lengths, line spacing, letter spacing, and spaces between pairs of letters. The term typography is also applied to the style, arrangement, and appearance of the letters, numbers, and symbols created by the process. Type design is a closely related craft, sometimes considered part of typography; most typographers do not design typefaces, and some type designers do not consider themselves typographers. Typography also may be used as an ornamental and decorative device, unrelated to the communication of information.

Typography is also the work of graphic designers, art directors, manga artists, comic book artists, and, now, anyone who arranges words, letters, numbers, and symbols for publication, display, or distribution, from clerical workers and newsletter writers to anyone self-publishing materials. Until the Digital Age, typography was a specialized occupation. Personal computers opened up typography to new generations of previously unrelated designers and lay users. As the capability to create typography has become ubiquitous, the application of principles and best practices developed over generations of skilled workers and professionals has diminished.

== Etymology ==
The word typography in English derives from the Greek roots týpos 'type' + -graphía 'writing'.

== History ==
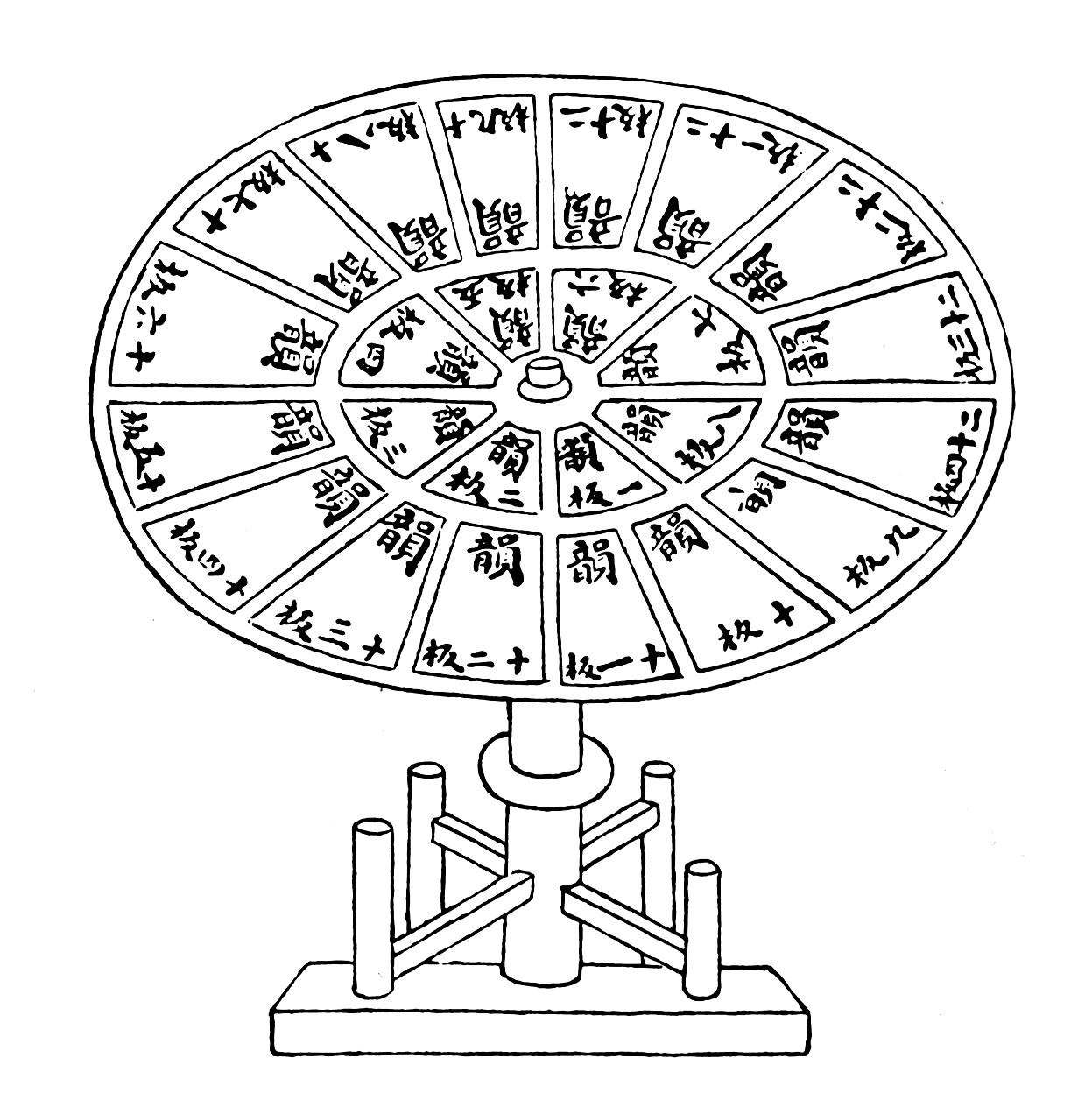
A revolving type case for wooden type in China, an illustration shown in a book published in 1313 by Wang Zhen

Although typically applied to printed, published, broadcast, and reproduced materials in contemporary times, all words, letters, symbols, and numbers written alongside the earliest naturalistic drawings by humans may be called typography. The word typography is derived from the Greek words τύπος typos 'form' or "impression" and γράφειν graphein 'to write', and traces its origins to the first punches and dies used to make seals and currency in ancient times, which ties the concept to printing. The uneven spacing of the impressions on brick stamps found in the Mesopotamian cities of Uruk and Larsa, dating from the second millennium BC, may be evidence of type, wherein the reuse of identical characters was applied to create cuneiform text. Babylonian cylinder seals were used to create an impression on a surface by rolling the seal on wet clay. Typography was also implemented in the Phaistos Disc, an enigmatic Minoan printed item from Crete, which dates to between 1850 and 1600 BC. It has been proposed that Roman lead pipe inscriptions were created with movable type printing, but German typographer Herbert Brekle recently dismissed this view.

The essential criterion of type identity was met by medieval print artifacts such as the Latin Pruefening Abbey inscription of 1119 that was created by the same technique as the Phaistos Disc. The silver altarpiece of patriarch Pellegrinus II (1195–1204) in the cathedral of Cividale was printed with individual letter punches. Apparently, the same printing technique may be found in tenth- to twelfth-century Byzantine reliquaries. Other early examples include individual letter tiles where the words are formed by assembling single letter tiles in the desired order, which were reasonably widespread in medieval Northern Europe.

Typesetting with movable type was invented during the eleventh-century Song dynasty in China by Bi Sheng (990–1051). His movable type system was manufactured from ceramic materials, and clay type printing continued to be practiced in China until the Qing dynasty. Wang Zhen was one of the pioneers of wooden movable type. Although the wooden type was more durable under the mechanical rigors of handling, repeated printing wore the character faces down and the types could be replaced only by carving new pieces. Metal movable type was first invented in Korea during the Goryeo, c. 1230. Hua Sui introduced bronze type printing to China in 1490. The diffusion of both movable-type systems was limited and the technology did not spread beyond East and Central Asia.

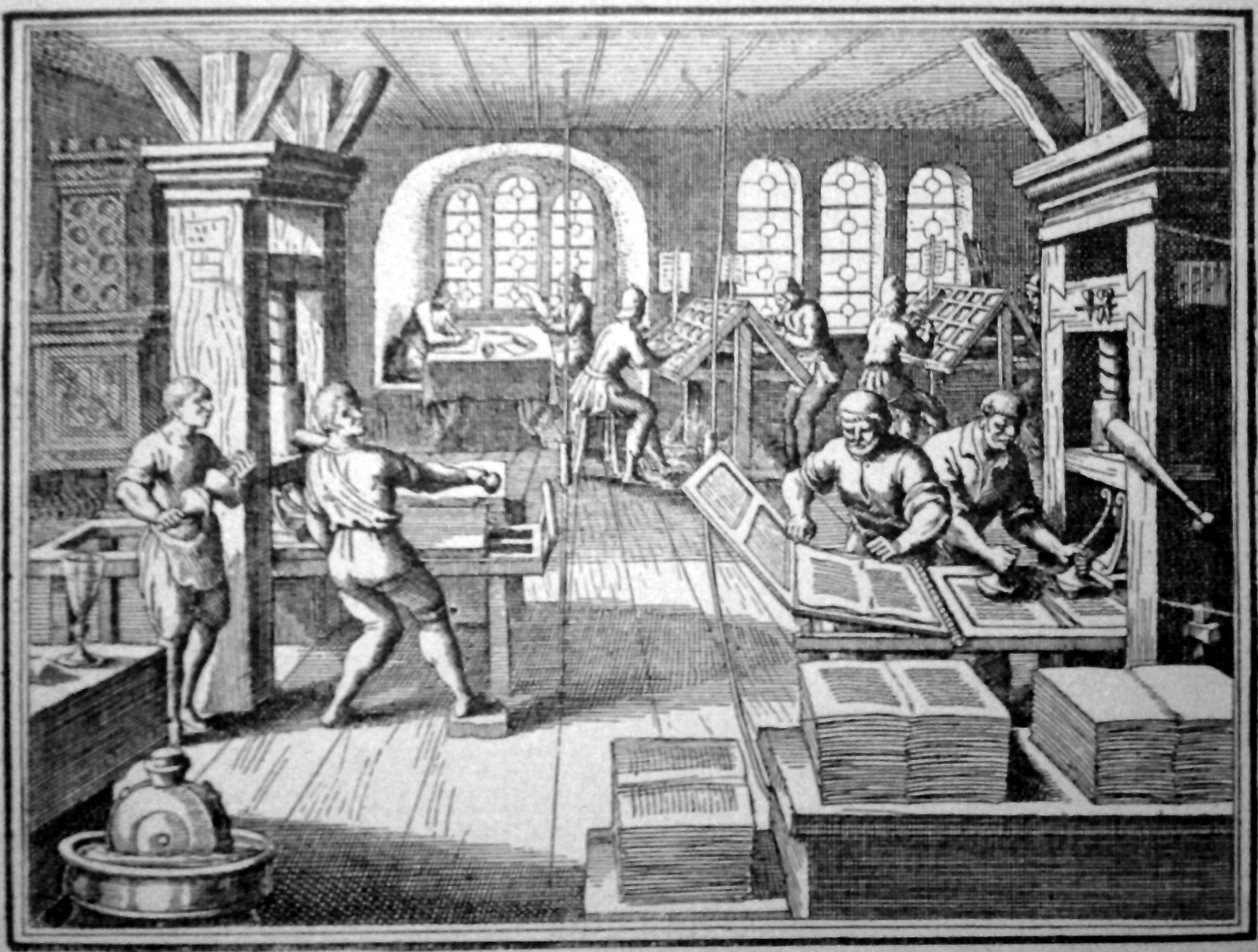
A sixteenth-century workshop in Germany showing a printing press and many of the activities involved in the process of printing

Modern movable type, along with the mechanical printing press, is most often attributed to the goldsmith Johannes Gutenberg in 1439. His type pieces, made from a lead-based alloy, suited printing purposes so well that the alloy is still used today. Gutenberg developed specialized techniques for casting and combining cheap copies of letter punches in the vast quantities required to print multiple copies of texts. This technical breakthrough was instrumental in starting the Printing Revolution and the first book printed with lead-based movable type was the Gutenberg Bible.

Rapidly advancing technology revolutionized typography in the latter twentieth century. During the 1960s, some camera-ready typesetting could be produced in any office or workshop with stand-alone machines such as those introduced by IBM, such as its Selectric typewriter. During the same period Letraset introduced dry transfer technology that allowed designers to transfer types instantly. During the mid-1980s, personal computers allowed type designers to create typefaces digitally using commercial graphic design software such as Fontographer. Digital technology also enabled designers to create more experimental typefaces as well as the practical typefaces of traditional typography. Designs for typefaces could be created faster with the new technology, and for more specific functions. The cost for developing typefaces was drastically lowered, becoming widely available to the masses. The change has been called the "democratization of type" and has given new designers more opportunities to enter the field.

=== Evolution ===
The design of typefaces has developed alongside typesetting systems. Although typography has evolved significantly from its origins, it is a largely conservative art that tends to cleave closely to tradition. This is because legibility is paramount, and so the typefaces that are the most readable usually are retained. In addition, the evolution of typography is inextricably intertwined with lettering by hand and related art forms, especially formal styles, which thrived for centuries preceding typography, and so the evolution of typography must be discussed with reference to this relationship.

In the nascent stages of European printing, the typeface was designed in imitation of the popular hand-lettering styles of scribes. Initially, this typeface was difficult to read, because each letter was set in place individually and made to fit tightly into the allocated space. The art of manuscript writing, the origin of which was during Hellenistic and Roman bookmaking, reached its zenith in the illuminated manuscripts of the Middle Ages. Metal type notably altered the style, making it "crisp and uncompromising", and also brought about "new standards of composition". During the Renaissance period in France, Claude Garamond was partially responsible for the adoption of Roman typefaces that eventually supplanted the more commonly used blackletter types. Roman typeface also was based on hand-lettering styles.

The development of Roman typeface can be traced back to Greek lapidary letters. Greek lapidary letters were carved into stone and "one of the first formal uses of Western letterforms"; after that, Roman lapidary letterforms evolved into the monumental capitals, which laid the foundation for Western typographical design, especially serif typefaces. There are two styles of Roman typefaces: the old style, and the modern. The former is characterized by its similarly weighted lines, while the latter is distinguished by its contrast of light and heavy lines. Often, these styles are combined.

In relation to the international graphics of the 1920s and 1930s, the term "International Typographic Style" is used. In the 1950s and 1960s, a phenomenon known as "Swiss style" emerged in typography.

By the twentieth century, computers had simplified the process of typeface design. This has allowed the number of typefaces and styles to proliferate exponentially, with hundreds of thousands of unique typefaces now available. Confusion between typeface and font (the various styles of a single typeface) occurred in 1984 when Steve Jobs mislabeled typefaces as fonts for Apple computers and his error has been perpetuated throughout the computer industry, leading to common misuse by the public of the term font when typeface is the proper term.

=== Experimental typeface uses ===
"Experimental typography" is defined as the unconventional and more artistic approach to typeface selection. Francis Picabia was a Dada pioneer of this practice in the early twentieth century. David Carson is often associated with this movement, particularly for his work in Ray Gun magazine in the 1990s. His work caused an uproar in the design community for abandoning standard practices in typeface selection, layout, and design. Experimental typography is said to emphasize expressing emotion rather than legibility when communicating ideas, and is therefore considered bordering on art.

== Techniques ==
There are many facets to the expressive use of typography, and with those come many different techniques to help with visual aid and graphic design. Spacing and kerning, size-specific spacing, x-height and vertical proportions, character variation, width, weight, and contrast are several techniques that are necessary to be taken into consideration when thinking about the appropriateness of specific typefaces or creating them. When placing two or more different and/or contrasting fonts together, these techniques come into play for organizational strategies and to achieve an attractive look. For example, if the bulk of a title has a more unfamiliar or unusual font, simpler sans-serif fonts will help complement the title while attracting more attention to the piece as a whole.

== Scope ==
In contemporary use, the practice and study of typography include a broad range, covering all aspects of letter design and application, both mechanical (typesetting, type design, and typefaces) and manual (handwriting and calligraphy). Typographical elements may appear in a wide variety of situations, including:

- Documents
- Presentations
- Display typography (described below)
- Clothing
- Maps and labels
- Vehicle instrument panels
- As a component of industrial design—type on household appliances, pens, and wristwatches, for example
- As a component in modern poetry (for example, the poetry of e. e. cummings)

Since digitization, typographical uses have spread to a wider range of applications, appearing on web pages, LCDs, mobile phone screens, and hand-held video games.

== Text typefaces ==
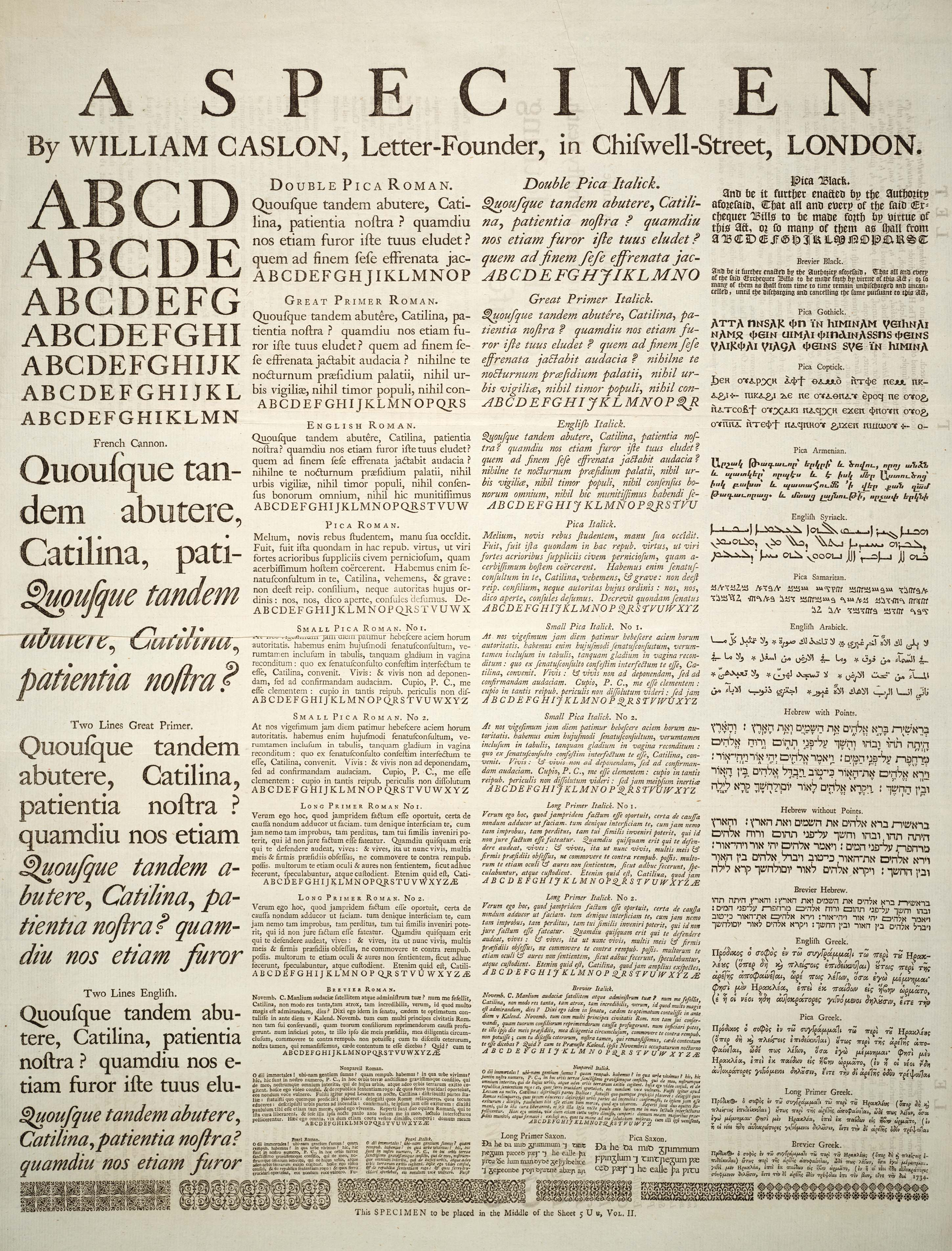
A specimen sheet by William Caslon showing printed examples of Roman typefaces

Traditionally, text is composed to create a readable, coherent, and visually satisfying block of type that works invisibly, without the awareness of the reader. Even distribution of typeset material, with a minimum of distractions and anomalies, aims to produce clarity and transparency.

Choice of typefaces is the primary aspect of text typography—prose fiction, non-fiction, editorial, educational, religious, scientific, spiritual, and commercial writing all have differing characteristics and requirements of appropriate typefaces (and their fonts or styles). For historic material, established text typefaces frequently are chosen according to a scheme of historical genre acquired by a long process of accretion, with considerable overlap among historical periods.

Contemporary books are more likely to be set with state-of-the-art "text romans" or "book romans" typefaces with serifs and design values echoing present-day design arts, which are closely based on traditional models such as those of Nicolas Jenson, Francesco Griffo (a punchcutter who created the model for Aldine typefaces), and Claude Garamond. With their more specialized requirements, newspapers and magazines rely on compact, tightly fitted styles of text typefaces with serifs specially designed for the task, which offer maximum flexibility, readability, legibility, and efficient use of page space. Sans serif text typefaces (without serifs) often are used for introductory paragraphs, incidental text, and whole short articles. A fashion at the end of the twentieth century was to pair a sans-serif typeface for headings with a high-performance serif typeface of matching style for the text of an article.

Typesetting conventions are modulated by orthography and linguistics, word structures, word frequencies, morphology, phonetic constructs and linguistic syntax. Typesetting conventions also are subject to specific cultural conventions. For example, in French it is customary to insert a non-breaking space before a colon (:) or semicolon (;) in a sentence, while in English it is not.

=== Color ===
In typesetting, color is the overall density of the ink on the page, determined mainly by the typeface, but also by the word spacing, leading, and depth of the margins. Text layout, tone, or color of the set text, and the interplay of text with the white space of the page in combination with other graphic elements impart a "feel" or "resonance" to the subject matter. With printed media, typographers also are concerned with binding margins, paper selection, and printing methods when determining the correct color of the page.

=== Principles of the typographic craft ===
Three fundamental aspects of typography are legibility, readability, and aesthetics. Although in a non-technical sense "legible" and "readable" are often used synonymously, typographically they are separate but related concepts. Legibility and readability tend to support aesthetic aspects of a product.

Legibility describes how easily individual characters can be distinguished from one another. It is described by Walter Tracy as "the quality of being decipherable and recognisable". For instance, if a b and an h, or a 3 and an 8, are difficult to distinguish at small sizes, this is a problem of legibility. Typographers are concerned with legibility insofar as it is their job to select the correct font to use. Brush script is an example of a font containing many characters that might be difficult to distinguish. The selection of cases influences the legibility of typography because using only uppercase letters (all-caps) reduces legibility.

Readability refers to how easy it is to read the text as a whole, as opposed to the individual character recognition described by legibility. Use of margins, word and line spacing, and clear document structure all impact readability. Some fonts or font styles, for instance sans-serif fonts, are considered to have low readability and so are unsuited for large quantities of prose.

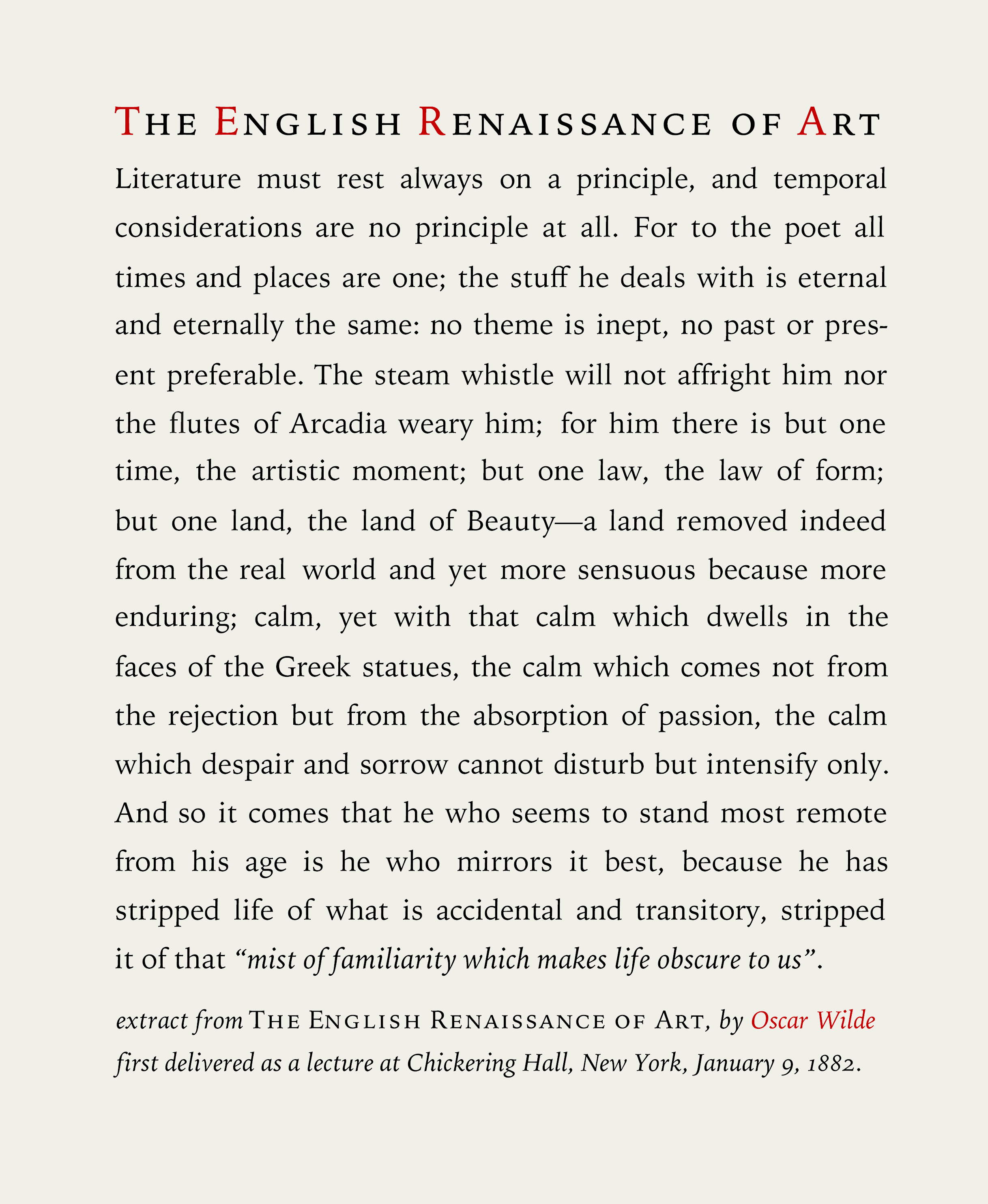
Text typeset example in Iowan old style roman, italics, and small caps, optimized at approximately ten words per line, typeface sized at 14 points on 1.4 × leading, with 0.2 points extra tracking using an extract of a lecture by Oscar Wilde The English Renaissance of Art, 1882

In short, legibility "refers to perception" (being able to see as determined by physical limitations of the eye), and readability "refers to comprehension" (understanding the meaning).

"The typeface chosen should be legible. That is, it should be read without effort. Sometimes legibility is simply a matter of type size; more often, however, it is a matter of typeface design. Case selection always influences legibility. In general, typefaces that are true to the basic letterforms are more legible than typefaces that have been condensed, expanded, embellished, or abstracted."

However, even a legible typeface can become unreadable through poor setting and placement, just as a less legible typeface can be made more readable through good design.

Studies of both legibility and readability have examined a wide range of factors including type size and type design, comparing serif vs. sans-serif type, roman type vs. oblique type and italic type, line length, line spacing, color contrast, the design of right-hand edge (for example, justification, straight right hand edge) vs. ragged right, and whether text is hyphenated. Justified copy must be adjusted tightly during typesetting to prevent loss of readability, something beyond the capabilities of typical personal computers.

Legibility is usually measured through the speed of reading, with comprehension scores used to check for effectiveness (that is, not a rushed or careless read). For example, Miles Tinker, who published numerous studies from the 1930s to the 1960s, used a speed of reading test that required participants to spot incongruous words as an effectiveness filter.

The Readability of Print Unit at the Royal College of Art under Professor Herbert Spencer with Brian Coe and Linda Reynolds did important work in this area. It was one of the centers that revealed the importance of the saccadic rhythm of eye movement for readability—in particular, the ability to take in (i.e., recognise the meaning of groups of) about three words at once and the physiognomy of the eye, which means the eye tires if the line required more than three or four of these saccadic jumps. More than this is found to introduce strain and errors in reading (e.g., doubling). The use of all-caps renders words indistinguishable as groups, all letters presenting a uniform line to the eye, requiring special effort for separation and understanding.

Currently, legibility research tends to be limited to critical issues or the testing of specific design solutions (for example, when new typefaces are developed). Examples of critical issues include typefaces for people with visual impairment, typefaces and case selection for highway and street signs, or for other conditions where legibility may make a key difference.

Much of the legibility research literature is atheoretical—various factors were tested individually or in combination (inevitably so, as the different factors are interdependent), but many tests lacked a model of reading or visual perception. Some typographers believe that the overall word shape (Bouma) is essential in readability and that the theory of parallel letter recognition is wrong, less important, or not the entire picture. Word shape differs by outline, influenced by ascending and descending elements of lowercase letters and enables reading the entire word without having to parse out each letter.

Text typeset using LaTeX typesetting software, often used for academic papers and journals

Readability also may be compromised by letter-spacing, word spacing, or leading that is too tight or too loose. It may be improved when generous vertical space separates text lines, making it easier for the eye to distinguish one line from the next, or previous line. Poorly designed typefaces and those that are too tightly or loosely fitted also may be less legible. Underlining also may reduce readability by eliminating the recognition effect contributed by the descending elements of letters.

Periodical publications, especially newspapers and magazines, use typographical elements to achieve an attractive, distinctive appearance, to aid readers in navigating the publication, and in some cases for dramatic effect. By formulating a style guide, a publication or periodical standardizes with a relatively small collection of typefaces, each used for specific elements within the publication, and makes consistent use of typefaces, case, type sizes, italic, boldface, colors, and other typographic features such as combining large and small capital letters together. Some publications, such as The Guardian and The Economist, go so far as to commission a type designer to create customized typefaces for their exclusive use.

Different periodicals design their publications, including their typography, to achieve a particular tone or style. For example, USA Today uses a bold, colorful, and comparatively modern style through their use of a variety of typefaces and colors; type sizes vary widely, and the newspaper's name is placed on a colored background. In contrast, The New York Times uses a more traditional approach, with fewer colors, less typeface variation, and more columns.

Especially on the front page of newspapers and on magazine covers, headlines often are set in larger display typefaces to attract attention, and are placed near the masthead.

Typography utilized to characterize text: Typography is intended to reveal the character of the text. Through the use of typography, a body of text can instantaneously reveal the mood the author intends to convey to its readers. The message that a body of text conveys has a direct relationship with the typeface that is chosen. Therefore, when a person focuses on typography and setting type, they must pay very close attention to the typeface they choose. Choosing the correct typeface for a body of text can only be done after thoroughly reading the text, understanding its context, and understanding what the text is wishing to convey. Once the typographer has an understanding of the text, then they have the responsibility of using the appropriate typeface to honor the writing done by the author of the text. Knowledge required to choose the correct typeface comes with understanding the historical background of typefaces and understanding the reason that typeface was created. For example, if the text is titled "Commercial Real Estate Transactions" and elaborates on the real estate market throughout the body, then the appropriate typeface is a serif typeface, because the author intends to inform his audience on a serious topic and not entertain his audience with an anecdote; a serif typeface would convey a sense of seriousness to the audience instantaneously. The typographer would also employ larger type for the title to convey its importance, which directly informs the reader of the structure in which the text is intended to be read, and increases readability from varying distances.

Typography utilized to make reading practical: Typography not only must honor the tone of the text but also share the responsibility of making the audience commence reading and sustaining the audience's attention throughout the text. Although typography can potentially attract the reader's attention and create a beautiful/attractive piece of text, the craft of typography is not limited to the aesthetic appeal of the text. On the contrary, the object of typography is to make the reading experience practical and useful. Bold colors, multiple typefaces, and colorful backgrounds in a typographic design may be eye-catching; however, it may not be appropriate for all bodies of text and could potentially make text illegible. Overuse of design elements such as colors and typefaces can be unsettling, preventing the text from conveying its message to readers. A study from 2020 found that the participating subjects felt music sounded "more pleasant" when the CD cover featured round typeface.

== Display graphics ==
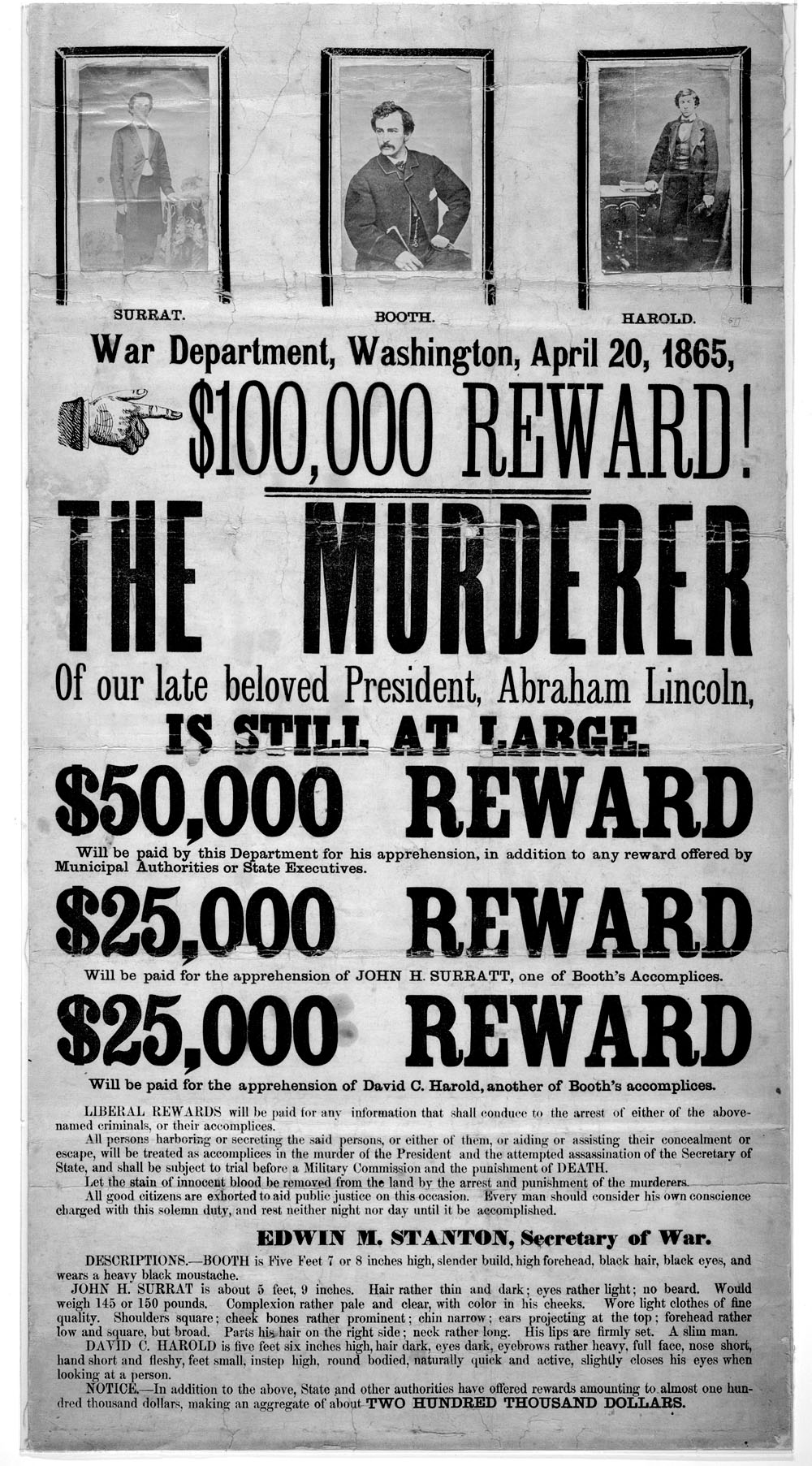
Nineteenth-century wanted poster for John Wilkes Booth (the assassin of U.S. President Abraham Lincoln) printed with lead and woodcut type, and incorporating photography

Type may be combined with negative space and images, forming relationships and dialog between the words and images for special effects. Display designs are a potent element in graphic design. Some sign designers exhibit less concern for readability, sacrificing it for an artistic manner. Color and size of type elements may be much more prevalent than in solely text designs. Most display items exploit type at larger sizes, where the details of letter design are magnified. Color is used for its emotional effect in conveying the tone and nature of subject matter.

Display typography encompasses:

- Advertisements in publications, such as newspapers and magazines
- Magazine and newspaper headline type
- Signs and other large-scale-letter designs, such as information signs and billboards
- Posters
- Brochures and flyers
- Packaging and labeling
- Business communications and advertising
- Book covers
- Typographic logos, trademarks, and word marks
- Graffiti
- Inscriptions
- Architectural lettering
- Kinetic typography in motion pictures, television, vending machine displays, online, and computer screen displays

=== Advertising ===
Typography has long been a vital part of promotional material and advertising. Designers often use typefaces to set a theme and mood in an advertisement (for example, using bold, large text to convey a particular message to the reader). Choice of typeface is often used to draw attention to a particular advertisement, combined with efficient use of color, shapes, and images. In the early twenty-first century, typography in advertising often reflects a company's brand.

A brand may use typography to express its theme, personality, and message. Just by looking at the typeface, viewers can get an idea about the message and personality of the brand, which the brands are fully aware of and are tapping into the power of good typography.

Typefaces used in advertisements convey different messages to the reader: classical ones are for a strong personality, while more modern ones may convey clean, neutral look. Bold typefaces are used for making statements and attracting attention. In any design, a balance has to be achieved between the visual impact and communication aspects. Digital technology in the twentieth and twenty-first centuries has enabled the creation of typefaces for advertising that are more experimental than traditional typefaces.

=== Inscriptional and architectural lettering ===
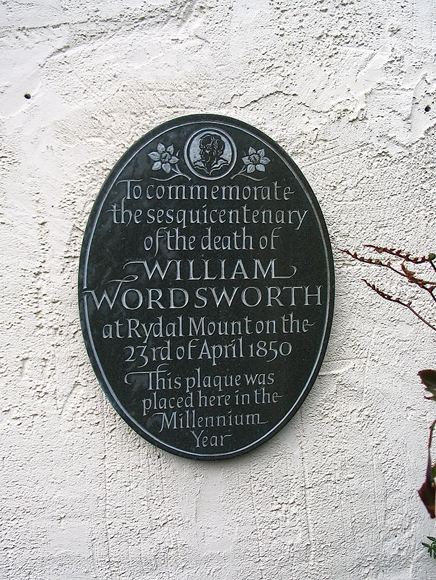
Plaque for the William Wordsworth Sesquicentenary, Rydal Mount, Cumbria, by John Shaw

The history of inscriptional lettering is intimately tied to the history of writing, the evolution of letterforms and the craft of the hand. The widespread use of the computer and various etching and sandblasting techniques today has made the hand carved monument a rarity, and the number of letter-carvers left in the US continues to dwindle.

For monumental lettering, proportions of letters need to be altered as their size and distance from the viewer increases. After assessing the context of the text, an expert monument designer may take up to an hour to carve one letter.

== Digital typography ==
Whilst the principles of good typography remain into the digital age, new tools are available to the typographer. Digital character encoding means that the presentation of text is independent of the meaning of that text; thus the same text can be used readily in different contexts but using different typefaces as appropriate to each context. Typographers have moved beyond the static pages of print books, newspapers, posters and other display materials, into design of dynamic materials such as web pages (see Web typography).

== See also ==
- Allograph, different representations of the same grapheme or character in different typefaces have the same meaning
- Desktop publishing – Page layout using a personal computer
- Letterpress printing – Technique of relief printing using a printing press
- Phototypesetting – Photographical analog method for text composition
- Punctuation – Marks to indicate pacing of written text
- Typesetting – Composition of text by means of arranging physical types or digital equivalents
- Typographic alignment – Setting of text flow or image placement relative to a page, column, table cell, or tab
- Typographic unit – Units of measurement
- List of typographic features
- List of typographical symbols and punctuation marks
- Category:Typographical symbols

=== By writing system ===
- Arabic typography
- East Asian typography
- History of Western typography

=== Supporting organizations ===
- ATypI: Association Typographique Internationale ("International Typographic Association")
- International Society of Typographic Designers
- Type Directors Club
- Women in Type
