= Prüfening dedicatory inscription =

Inscription impressed on clay which was created in 1119

Coordinates: 49°00′33″N 12°02′44″E

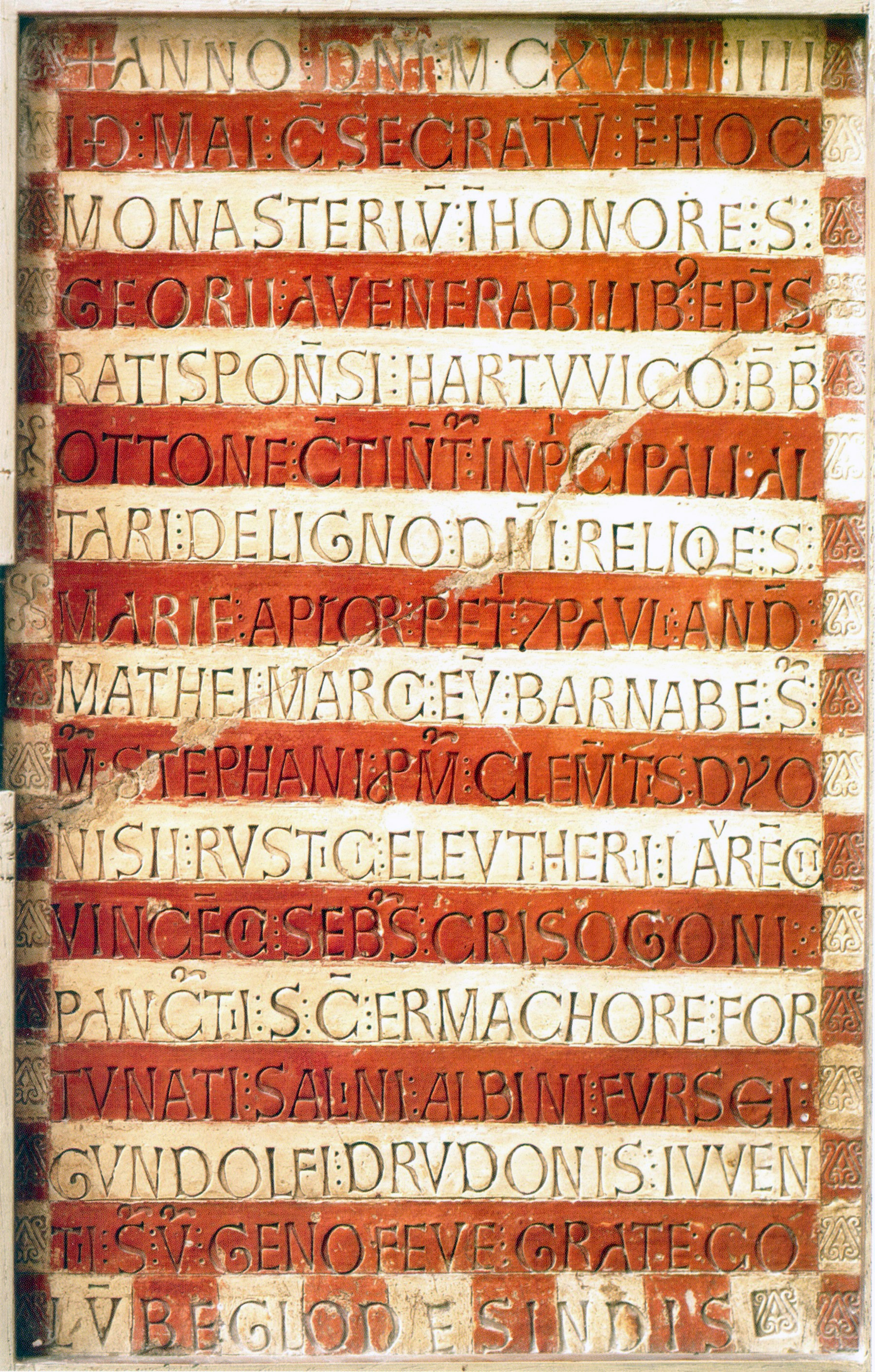
Prüfening dedicatory inscription. Its text was created by individual letter stamps.

The Prüfening dedicatory inscription (German: Prüfeninger Weiheinschrift) is a high medieval inscription impressed on clay which was created in 1119, over three hundred years before Johannes Gutenberg, by the typographic principle. The inscription plate belongs to the Prüfening Abbey, a former Benedictine monastery, in Regensburg, Germany.

== Description ==
The Latin inscription is still at its original location in Prüfening Abbey, attached to one of the main pillars of its church. It reports the consecration act of the monastery in honour of St. George, carried out by the two bishops Otto of Bamberg and Hartwig of Regensburg. The inscription plate specifies the year of the act and, by implication, its own date as 1119 (•MCXVIIII•). It was made of baked clay, painted over in an alternating, red white pattern, and is approximately 26 cm wide, 41 cm high and 3 cm thick, with a crack running through its entire breadth. The sunk letterforms are the classical capitalis monumentalis or Roman square capitals. Copies are at display in several German museums, including the Gutenberg Museum at Mainz.

== Typography ==
The unusual sharpness of the inscription letters has long led epigraphists to believe that they were not carved by hand into the clay. The typographic character of the inscription was demonstrated in a systematic examination of the text body by the typesetter and linguist Herbert Brekle. His findings confirm that the text was produced with a printing method similar to that of the Phaistos Disc: The 17-line text was created by pressing individual, pre-formed stamps (probably made of wood) into the soft clay in a way that, for each letter which occurred more than once, the same letter stamp was re-used, thereby producing identical imprints throughout the text. Thus, the essential criterion for typographic text production was met, namely the repeated use of identical types for a single character. In applying this technique, it is not relevant that the Prüfening inscription was made by stamping letters into the clay and not − as later practiced by Gutenberg − by printing on paper, since neither the technical execution nor the print medium define movable type printing, but rather the criterion of type identity:

The defining criterion which a typographic print has to fulfill is that of the type identity of the various letter forms which make up the printed text. In other words: each letter form which appears in the text has to be shown as a particular instance ("token") of one and the same type which contains a reverse image of the printed letter.

By projecting the text letters one upon the other (e.g., all "A"s onto one another) at high magnification, the consistent type identity of the dedicatory inscription could be demonstrated beyond doubt. An additional indication that its creator had worked with reusable types is the marked tendency of some letters to tilt to the right or left; in those cases the artisan apparently did not succeed in setting up the letter stamps completely parallel to the lateral borderline of the plate. The evidence of the skewed letters, but most importantly the observation that the type token criterion was met throughout the text prove the "typographic character of the Prüfening dedicatory inscription with certainty."

A fragment of another inscription plate found close to the monastery indicates that the Prüfening abbey inscription did not remain an isolated phenomenon, but that at least locally the typographic production method was applied more frequently.

=== Further medieval techniques ===
In the cathedral of Cividale del Friuli in northern Italy, the silver altarpiece of Pellegrino II, the patriarch of Aquileia between 1195 and 1204, was inscribed in Latin by the means of individual letter punches (instead of stamps). Apart from stamping and punching, another typographic method existed which followed the scrabble principle: for decorating the paved floors of monasteries and churches, individual letter tiles were fired and then assembled so that they formed Christian inscriptions on the floor. This technique seemed to be fairly widespread, with known examples ranging from England over the Netherlands to Germany.

== Inscription text ==
The Latin inscription runs written out in full:

+ Anno domini MCXVIIII, IIII idus mai, consecratum est hoc monasterium in honore sancti Georgii a venerabilibus episcopis Ratisponensi Hartwico Bambergensi Ottone. Continentur in principali altari de ligno Domini; reliquiae sanctae Mariae; apostolorum Petri et Pauli, Andreae; Mathei, Marci, evangelistarum; Barnabae; sanctorum martyrum Stephani, protomartyris, Clementis, Dionysii, Rustici, Eleutherii, Laurentii, Vincentii, Sebastiani, Crisogoni, Pancratii; sanctorum confessorum Ermachorae, Fortunati, Salini, Albini, Fursei, Gundolfi, Drudonis, Juventii; sanctarum virginum Genofevae, Gratae, Columbae, Glodesindis.

Translated into English:

In AD 1119, on the fourth day before the Ides of May [12 May], this monastery was consecrated in honour of St. George by the venerable bishops Hartwig of Regensburg and Otto of Bamberg. In the main altar, relics are kept of the Cross of the Lord, of Holy Mary, of the apostles Peter, Paul and Andrew, of the evangelists Matthew and Mark, Barnabas, of the holy martyrs Stephen the protomartyr, Clement, Dionysius, Rusticus, Eleutherius, Laurentius, Vincentius, Sebastian, Chrisogonus, Pancratius; of the holy confessors Ermachora, Fortunatus, Salinus, Albinus, Furseus, Gundolf, Drudon, Juventinus; of the holy virgins Genoveva, Grata, Columba, Glodesindis.

== Sources ==
- Brekle, Herbert E. (1995), "Eine weitere Spur einer typographischen Werkstatt beim Kloster Prüfening im 12. Jahrhundert", Gutenberg-Jahrbuch, 70: 23–26
- Brekle, Herbert E. (1997), "Das typographische Prinzip. Versuch einer Begriffsklärung", Gutenberg-Jahrbuch, 72: 58–63
- Brekle, Herbert E. (2005), Die Prüfeninger Weihinschrift von 1119. Eine paläographisch-typographische Untersuchung (brief summary), Regensburg: Scriptorium Verlag für Kultur und Wissenschaft, ISBN 3-937527-06-0
- Hupp, Otto (1906), "Die Prüfeninger Weiheinschrift von 1119", Studien aus Kunst und Geschichte, Festschrift für Friedrich Schneider, Freiburg i. Br.: Herder
- Lehmann-Haupt, Hellmut (1940), "Englische Holzstempelalphabete des XIII. Jahrhunderts", Gutenberg-Jahrbuch: 93–97

Further medieval techniques

- Brekle, Herbert E. (2011), Die typographische Herstellungstechnik der Inschriften auf dem silbernen Altaraufsatz im Dom von Cividale (PDF), Regensburg
- Klamt, Christian (2004), "Letters van baksteen in een cistercienzerklooster: het Ave Maria te Zinna", in Stuip, R. E. V. (ed.), Meer dan muziek alleen: in memoriam Kees Vellekoop, Utrechtse bijdragen tot de mediëvistiek, vol. 20, Hilversum: Uitgeverij Verloren, pp. 195–210, ISBN 90-6550-776-0
- Koch, Walter (1994), Literaturbericht zur mittelalterlichen und neuzeitlichen Epigraphik (1985−1991), Monumenta Germaniae Historica: Hilfsmittel, vol. 14, München, p. 213, ISBN 978-3-88612-114-4
- Lipinsky, Angelo (1986), "La pala argentea del Patriarca Pellegrino nella Collegiata di Cividale e le sue iscrizioni con caratteri mobili", Ateneo Veneto, 24: 75–80
- Meijer, Frank (2004), De stenen letters van Aduard (2nd ed.), Groningen: Omnia Uitgevers, ISBN 978-90-75354-08-9
