= Palazzo Pretorio, Cividale del Friuli =

Palace in Cividale del Friuli, Italy

Coordinates: 46°05′36″N 13°25′56″E

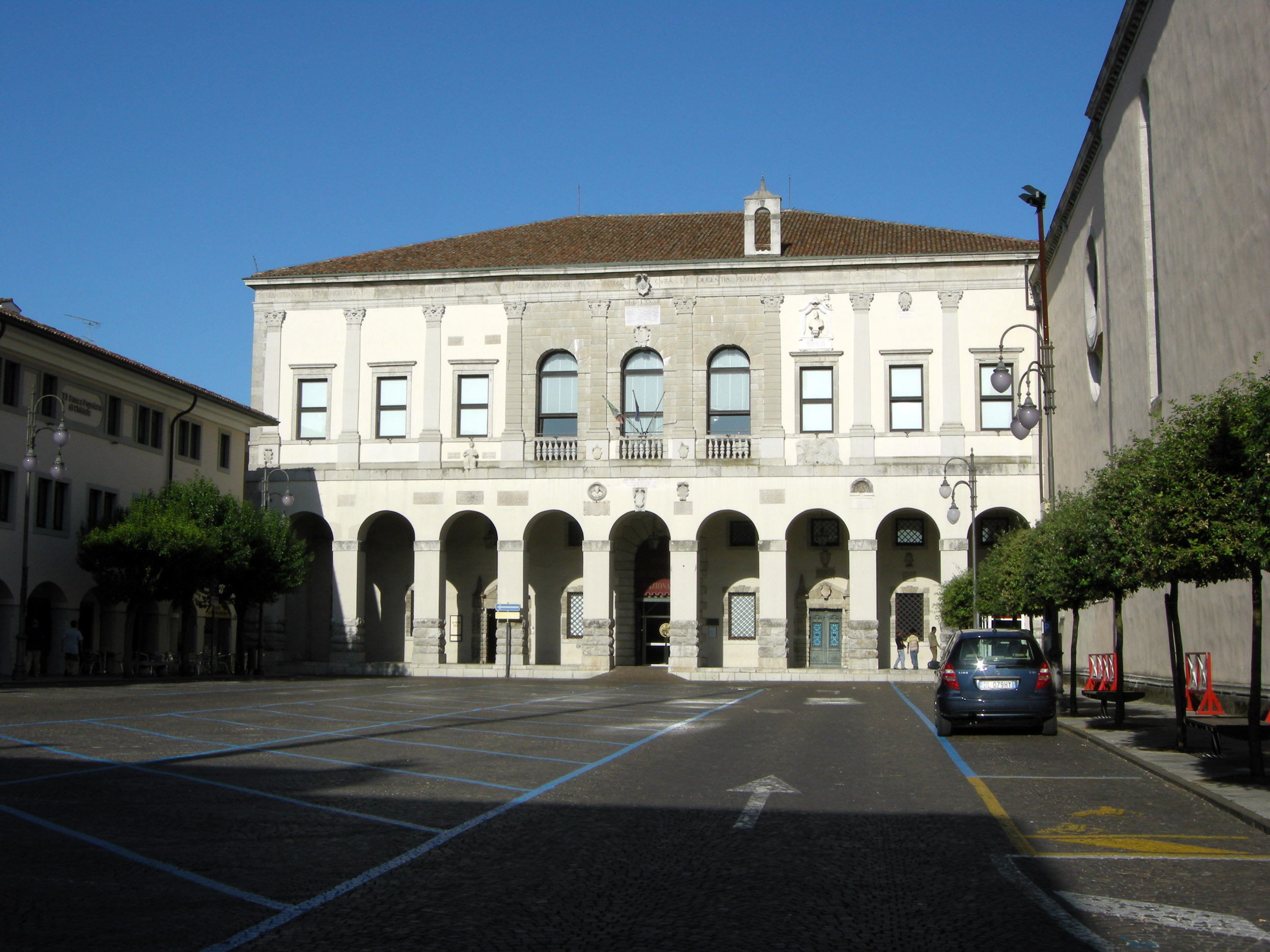
Palazzo Pretorio or dei Provveditori veneti in Cividale

The Palazzo Pretorio or Palazzo dei Provveditori veneti is a palace in Cividale del Friuli, northern Italy, attributed to the architect Andrea Palladio and built between 1565 and 1586. Since 1990 it is the home of the National Archeological Museum (Museo archeologico nazionale) of Cividale.

Renaissance art historian Giorgio Vasari testified of the existence of a project by Palladio for the Palazzo Pretorio at Cividale, for which he executed a model; he also wrote that the architect was present at the building’s foundation ceremony. The desire of the Civic Council to construct the Palazzo Pretorio dates to 1559, but the laying of the foundation stone had to wait until March 1565, when the financial means became available.

The palace was completed in 1586. Palladio's contribution in the building is not immediately recognizable, even if the peculiar basement, with its stone bosses, may derive from Palladio’s studies of the Roman antiquities in Dalmatia, specifically the amphitheatre in Pula. What seems probable is that the building’s execution was at least undertaken without Palladio’s control, and without particular respect for his original project.

== Bibliography ==
- Palazzo Pretorio in the CISA website (original source for the first revision of this article, with kind permission)
- Guido Beltramini and Antonio Padoan, Andrea Palladio: atlante delle architetture, Padova, Marsilio Editori, 2000
