= Altarpiece of Pellegrino II =

Altarpiece in Cividale del Friuli, Italy

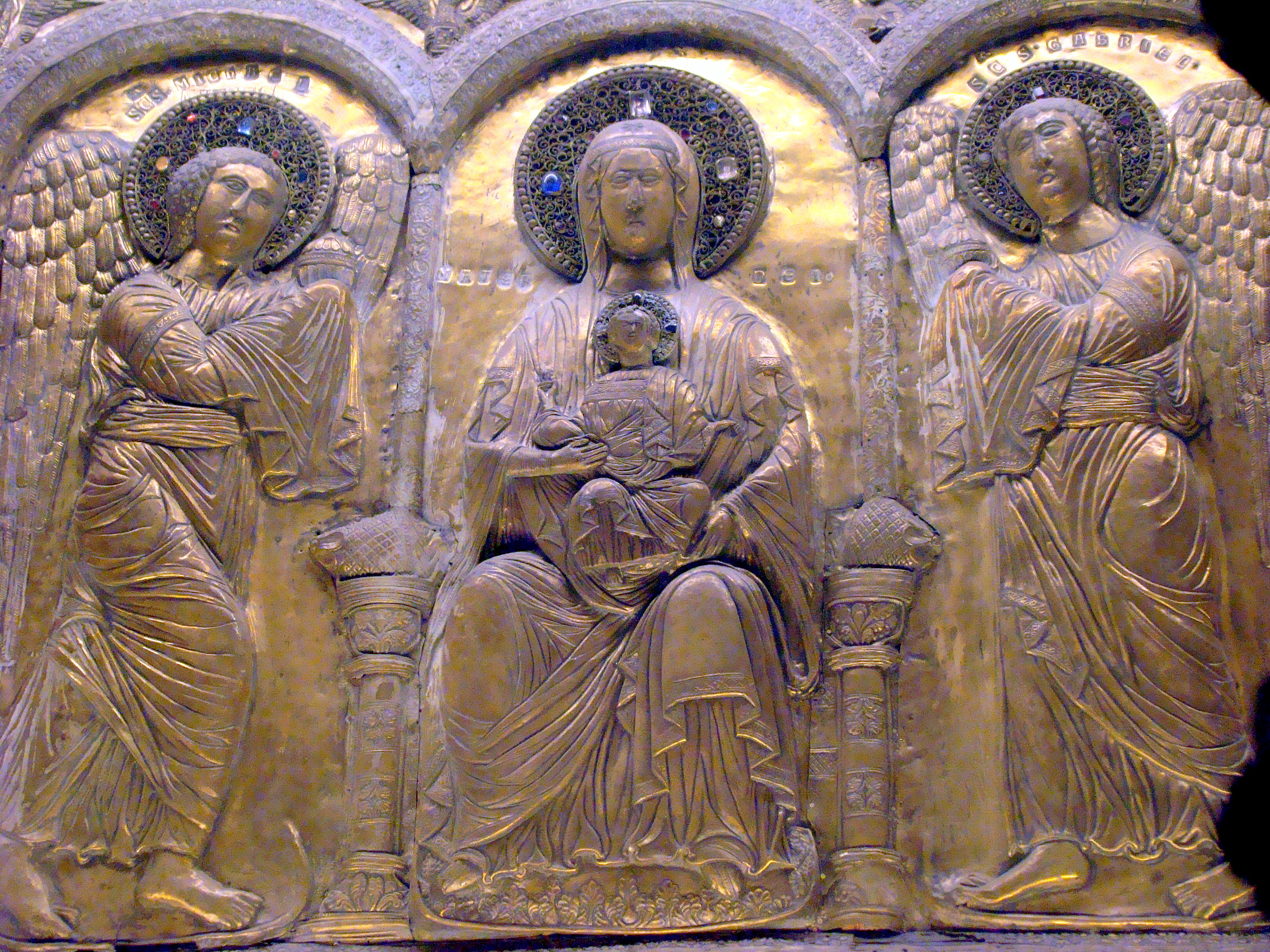
Triptych of the altarpiece showing Mary with the Child Jesus on her lap, flanked by two archangels

The altarpiece of Pellegrino II is a medieval altarpiece in the cathedral of Cividale, Italy. The silver relief was endowed by Pellegrino II, the patriarch of Aquileia, around 1200 and adorns today the main altar of the church Santa Maria Assunta. It shows Mary and the Child Jesus surrounded by archangels and groups of saints. The piece is notable for its rich ornamentation and its early typographic inscription.

== Description ==
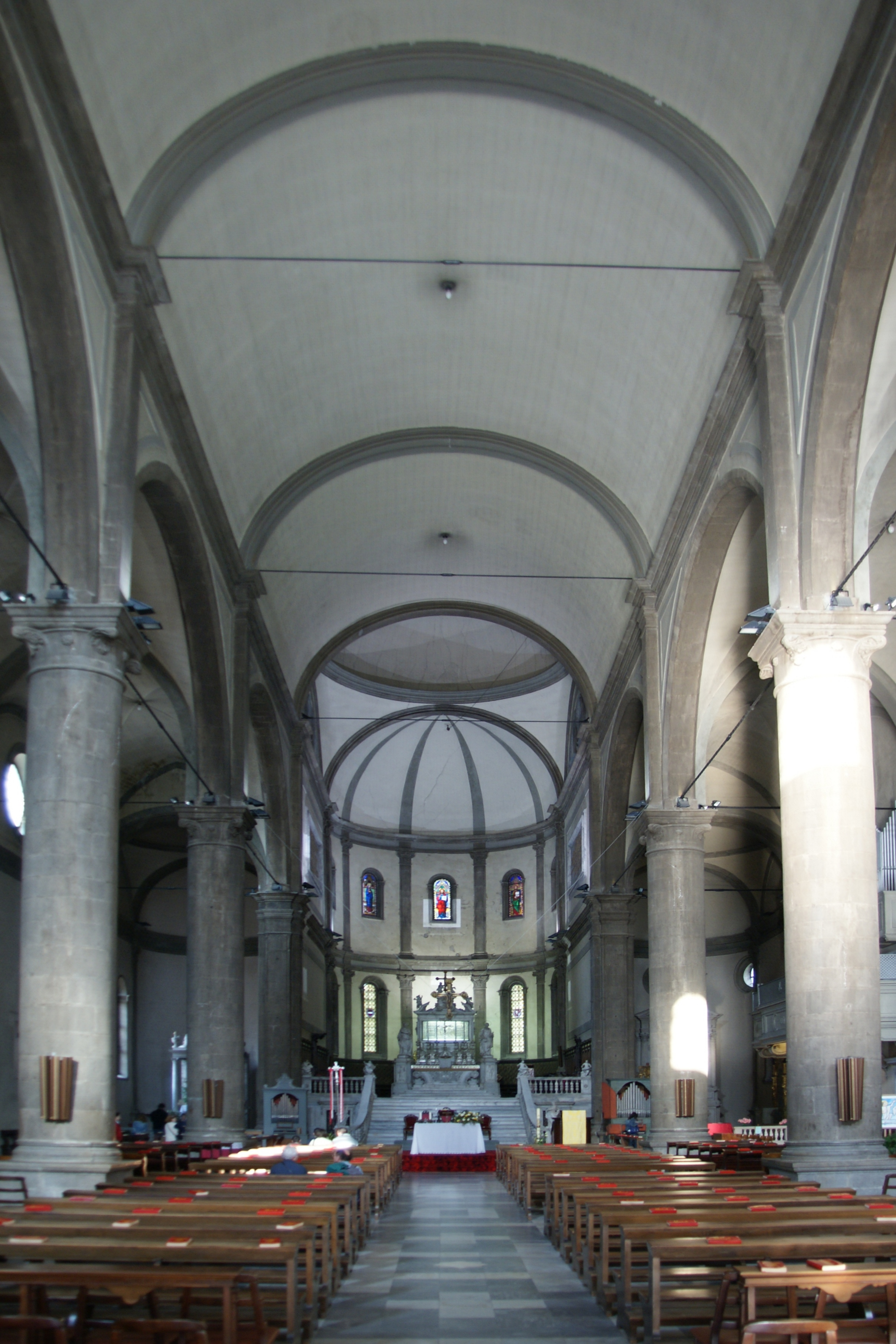
View along the nave onto the illuminated altarpiece in the choir

The altarpiece is located in the cathedral Santa Maria Assunta in the town of Cividale in Friuli. The rectangular relief plate which measures about one meter high and two meters wide is made of partly gilded silver. Protected by a modern glass case, it towers above the principal altar in the choir. It was consecrated by Pellegrino II who was patriarch of Aquileia between 1195 and 1204.

The altarpiece is divided into four parts: the center consists of a triptych which shows Mary as the Mother of God (Latin mater dei) with the Child Jesus in her lap. From left and right the archangels Michael and Gabriel rush to the seated mother and her child. The whole scene takes place under a three-arched arcade. The triptych is flanked by two departments which display, in three horizontal lines each, a total of 25 male and female saints standing next to one other. All figures except the Child Jesus are identifiable by name. A frame displaying a series of head medallions without inscriptions runs all around the triptych and the two lateral sections. In the upper horizontal frame piece Christ and John the Baptist as well as the four Evangelists are depicted. In its lower counterpart Pellegrino II, kneeling at the feet of Mary, can be identified by an accompanying inscription as the donator of the altarpiece. On the inside of the two frame boards a votive inscription composed of ten Leonine verses runs horizontally across the altarpiece.

== Typography ==
All inscriptions of the altarpiece were written in Latin. The font of the dedicatory inscription is overall classified as Gothic capitalis. Modern commentators agree that the inscriptions were produced by hammering individual letter punches one by one into the silver plate. Evidence for this typographic method can be derived from the observation that the letterforms comply with the criterion of type identity according to which every letter imprint must come from one and the same letter punch. The type identity is inter alia evident in the repeated occurrence of the faulty letter "R" throughout the text that indicates a damaged letter punch. The high relief letters stand proud in rectangular recesses created by the bases of the low relief punches; the fine edges between these recesses are a further indication of the sequential use of individual letter punches. A number of letters which are not properly aligned to their baseline provide additional evidence that the artisan worked with separate punches.

A total of about forty types, which come in equal parts in a smaller and larger font size, were employed for creating the inscriptions. The smaller ones were used for the names of the saints and the donor's inscription of the patriarch, while the names of the archangels, of the Mother of God, the abbreviations of sanctus/sancta ("holy") and the two-line inscription were printed with the larger set. The latter text was punched into eight silver strips which were strung together and nailed onto the wooden substructure of the altarpiece.

According to the art historian Angelo Lipinsky, the altarpiece may have been inspired by Byzantine reliquaries which were decorated by the same typographic technique in the 10th to 12th centuries. However, a random check with the Limburg Staurotheca which dates from this period showed that the inscription was engraved directly into the metal.

The Prüfening dedicatory inscription of 1119 is another early example of typographic text production in the Latin West. It differs in some technical details though: its plate is made of clay, not silver, and the inscription was created in low relief with (wooden) stamps, not metal punches.

== Sources ==
- Brekle, Herbert E.: Die typographische Herstellungstechnik der Inschriften auf dem silbernen Altaraufsatz im Dom von Cividale, Regensburg 2011
- Brekle, Herbert E.: Die Prüfeninger Weiheinschrift von 1119. Eine paläographisch-typographische Untersuchung, Scriptorium Verlag für Kultur und Wissenschaft, Regensburg 2005, ISBN 3-937527-06-0
- Cuscito, Giuseppe: "La pala di Pellegrino II nel duomo di Cividale", Studi cividalesi, Antichità altoadriatiche, Vol. 7 (1975), pp. 99–108
- Koch, Walter: Literaturbericht zur mittelalterlichen und neuzeitlichen Epigraphik (1985−1991), Monumenta Germaniae Historica: Hilfsmittel, Vol. 14, Munich 1994, ISBN 978-3-88612-114-4, p. 213
- Lipinsky, Angelo: "La pala argentea del patriarca Pellegrino nella collegiata di Cividale e le sue iscrizioni con caratteri mobili", Ateneo Veneto, Vol. 24 (1986), pp. 75–80
- Pertoldi, Rudy: "La 'pala' in argento dorato della basilica di S. Maria Assunta a Cividale del Friuli ed il suo committente, il patriarca Pellegrino II", Forum Iulii, Vol. 21 (1997), pp. 91–113
- Visintini, Maria: "Alcune osservazioni sulla grande 'tabula argentea' del patriarca Pellegrino II", Forum Iulii, Vol. 31 (2007), pp. 39–72
