= Andrea di Bertholotti =

Italian painter

Andrea di Bertholotti (also called Bellunello) of Cividale (active 15th century) was an Italian painter and a master in the Guild of San Vito in 1462. He seems to have contracted for altar-pieces and mural decorations in Udine, San Vito and the surrounding towns, up to 1490. At the Palazzo Communale of Udine is a Crucifixion (1476). The sacristy of Santa Maria di Castello in San Vito possesses by him a Virgin and Child, between SS. Peter and Paul, dated 1488. In Savorgnano is a Madonna (1490).
