= National Archaeological Museum of Cividale del Friuli =

- Museo archeologico nazionale di Cividale del Friuli
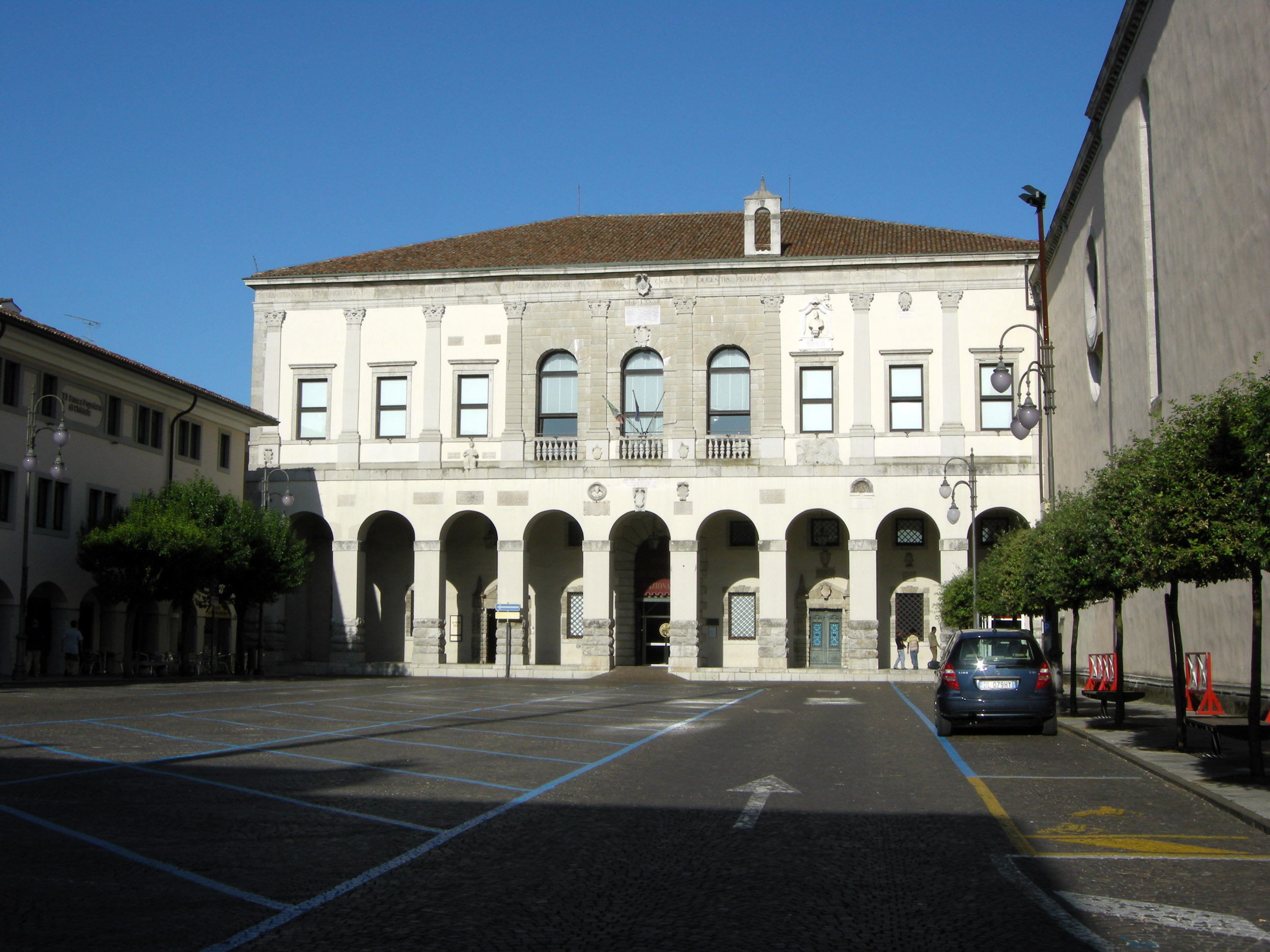
- Established: 1817
- Location: Piazza del Duomo 1, Cividale del Friuli
- Coordinates: 46.0934°N 13.4322°E
- Website: www.museoarcheologicocividale.beniculturali.it

The National Archaeological Museum of Cividale del Friuli is known for the high medieval archaeology, particularly with regard to the art Lombard. It is housed in the Palace Pretorio.

== History ==
It was founded at the Palais de Nordis in 1817 by count Michele della Torre Valsassina, before being transferred in 1990 at the Palace Pretorio in Duomo square. The present palace is attributed to Andrea Palladio and was built between 1565 and 1586
