= Antonio da Cividale =

Italian composer (c.1392–1421)

Antonio da Cividale (also Antonius de Civitate Austrie) (fl. 1392–1421) was an Italian composer of the early Quattrocento, at the end of the musical medieval era and beginning of the Renaissance. He is one of a few Italian composers of the early 15th century whose works have survived; they are transitional between the Trecento and the early Renaissance styles.

== Life ==
While a few details are known of his life, both the beginning and end are obscure. There has been confusion over dating of some of his compositions, some of which has been resolved recently, and most of his activity now seems to have been in the first two decades of the 15th century. He was a friar of the Dominican order; from his name, it can be inferred he was from the town of Cividale del Friuli. In 1392 an "Antonius de Civitato" entered the monastery of San Domenico in Venice, but he was from Città di Castello rather than Cividale del Friuli. However, Antonio da Cividale did compose the motet Strenua/Gaudeat, celebrating the marriage of Giorgio Ordelaffi, lord of Forlì, with Lucrezia degli Alidosi on 3 July 1412. Sometime between then and 1414 Antonio moved to Florence, where he wrote a motet, O felix flos Florencia/Gaude felix Dominice, in honor of the city of Florence and Leonardo Dati, the new Dominican Master General, who was elected on 29 September of that year (Schoop and Nosow). In 1420 he probably went to Rome along with Pope Martin V, who had recently been elected by the Council of Constance; Clarus ortus/Gloriosa matera a motet written in Martin V's honor in 1421, is probably by Antonio (Schoop and Nosow). There are no records of Antonio's life or activity after 1421.

== Music and influence ==
Antonio wrote both sacred and secular vocal music. Of the sacred music, four mass movements and six motets have survived (some of the motets were incidental pieces written for specific occasions; these are the ones with known dates). The motets are for three or four voices, the mass movements for two or three. Stylistically, his lines are short, broken by rests, and depend on repetition as well as sequential treatment of short motifs. He was also interested in compositional "tricks" such as phrases which are first sung forward, then backward, and in addition he wrote parts that were sometimes strictly canonic. Isorhythm and other traits of the contemporary French style are prominent, but unlike the French composers, Antonio seems to have written the tenor parts to his motets himself, rather than borrowing them from pre-existing chant. He was a fairly prolific composer, and while it is not known how much of his music is lost, his six surviving motets are one of the largest groups of surviving motets by a single Italian composer of the time. Most of his music survives in sources in northern Italy.

Three rondeaux, three virelais, and one ballade survive of his secular output. All except the ballade are in French; the ballade, Jo vegio per stasone, is in Italian, although with the exception of the incipit, the text is lost.

The music of Antonio and his contemporaries was a formative influence on Guillaume Dufay during his years on the Italian peninsula.

== References and further reading ==
- Hans Schoop/Robert Nosow: "Antonius de Civitate Austrie", Grove Music Online, ed. Deane L. Root (accessed August 30, 2017), (subscription access)
- Hans Schoop, "Antonius de Civitate Austrie", The New Grove Dictionary of Music and Musicians, ed. Stanley Sadie. 20 vol. London, Macmillan Publishers Ltd., 1980. ISBN 1-56159-174-2
- Gustave Reese, Music in the Renaissance. New York, W.W. Norton & Co., 1954. ISBN 0-393-09530-4
