= Medieval letter tile =

Type of monastic ceramic tile

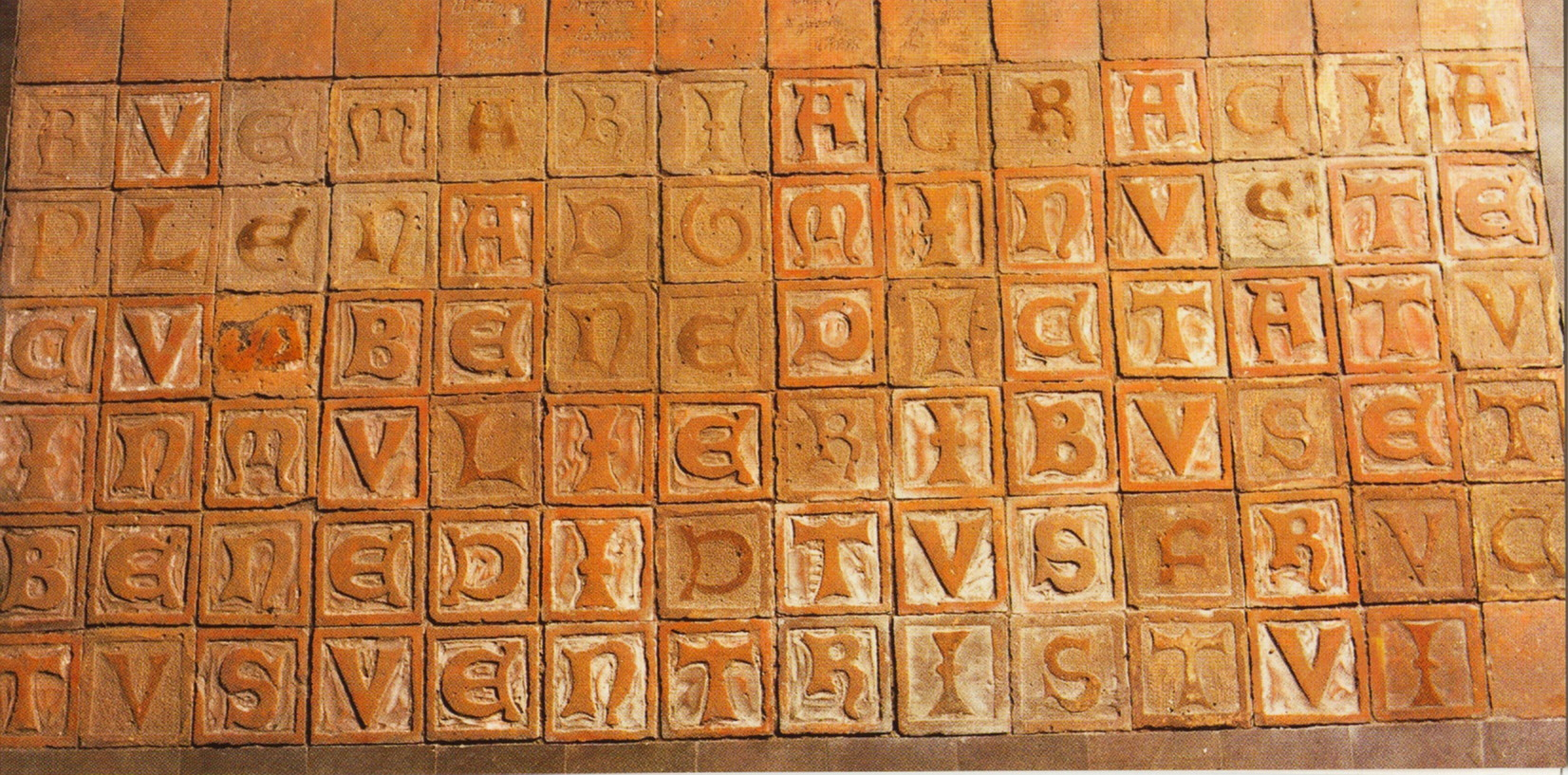
Ave Maria composed of individual letter tiles in Zinna Abbey, Germany

Medieval letter tiles are one-letter ceramic tiles that were employed in monasteries and churches of the late Middle Ages for the creation of Christian inscriptions on floors and walls. They were created by pressing stamps bearing a reverse image into soft clay, which was then baked hard, and they were used to form words by assembling single-letter tiles in the desired order.

== Background ==
The decoration technique is notable for being an early form of movable type printing which essentially is nothing but the stringing together of identically created individual letters for the purpose of producing an image. Compared to the conventional printing technique later established by Johannes Gutenberg, though, medieval tile alphabets were created in an inverse order: In a first step, the (im)printing was done, and only then the process of typesetting occurred, by spreading out the individual letter tiles onto the floor and composing them into words and lines of text.

== Use ==
The use of movable letter tiles is documented for the English Chertsey Abbey, from whose ruins specimens dating to the second half of the 13th century were recovered, as well as for the early 14th‑century flooring of the Dutch Aduard Abbey. In Zinna Abbey south of Berlin, there is an extant Ave Maria embedded in the floor before the altar. Each letter appears as a relief print on an unglazed, red-brown terracotta tile measuring 14 × 14 cm. The Latin inscription dates to the 13th or 14th century and was composed in Gothic majuscule.

The Prüfening dedicatory inscription is a Latin church inscription on a single clay tablet using a different principle, apparently made by stamping out the words with individual letter stamps or types.

== See also ==
- Glass tile

== Sources ==
- Brekle, Herbert E. (1997), "Das typographische Prinzip. Versuch einer Begriffsklärung", Gutenberg-Jahrbuch, 72: 58–63 (61f.)
- Klamt, Christian (2004), "Letters van baksteen in een cistercienzerklooster: het Ave Maria te Zinna", in Stuip, R. E. V. (ed.), Meer dan muziek alleen: in memoriam Kees Vellekoop, Utrechtse bijdragen tot de mediëvistiek, vol. 20, Hilversum: Uitgeverij Verloren, pp. 195–210, ISBN 90-6550-776-0
- Lehmann-Haupt, Hellmut (1940), "Englische Holzstempelalphabete des XIII. Jahrhunderts", Gutenberg-Jahrbuch: 93–97
- Meijer, Frank (2004), De stenen letters van Aduard (2nd ed.), Groningen: Omnia Uitgevers, ISBN 978-90-75354-08-9
- Haberley, Loyd (1937): "Medieval English Paving Tiles", Blackwel
