= Dominic Montserrat =

British Egyptologist (1964–2004)

- Born: 2 January 1964; Slough, United Kingdom
- Died: 23 September 2004 (aged 40); London, United Kingdom

Academic background
- Education: Durham University; University College London

Academic work
- Discipline: Egyptology
- Institutions: University of Warwick; The Open University

Dominic Alexander Sebastian Montserrat (2 January 1964 – 23 September 2004) was a British egyptologist and papyrologist.

== Early life and education ==
Dominic Alexander Sebastian Montserrat was born in Slough on 2 January 1964. He was born with hemophilia, a genetic disorder that impairs the body's ability to stop bleeding.

Montserrat studied Egyptology at Durham University and received his PhD in Classics at University College London, specializing in Greek, Coptic and Egyptian Papyrology.

== Academic career ==
From 1992 to 1999 he taught Classics at the University of Warwick. His increasingly deteriorating health led Montserrat to resign from teaching in 1999 and take up a research post in the classics department of The Open University. On 23 September 2004, he died from the effects of his illness at the age of forty.

Despite his ill health Montserrat was remarkably productive in his brief scholarly life: he was a member of the committee of the Egypt Exploration Society, for which he published regularly, and curated the award-winning travelling exhibition Ancient Egypt: Digging For Dreams of the Petrie Museum of Egyptian Archaeology. A wider audience saw him co-presenting the TV documentary series The Egyptian Detectives, a production of National Geographic Channel and Channel Five.

In his 1996 debut book Sex and Society in Graeco-Roman Egypt Montserrat presented a broad study of ancient sexuality and its cultural manifestations in Greco-Roman Egypt. His second book focused on the life and times of the "heretic pharaoh" Akhenaten (2000), whose long afterlife as an object of modern interpretations and appropriations he critically analyzed.

== Selected works ==
- Sex and Society in Graeco-Roman Egypt, London & New York: Kegan Paul, 1996, ISBN 0-7103-0530-3
- From Constantine to Julian: Pagan and Byzantine Views. A Source History, London & New York: Routledge, 1996 (co-editor), ISBN 0-415-09335-X
- Akhenaten: History, Fantasy and Ancient Egypt, London & New York: Routledge, 2000, ISBN 0-415-18549-1

== See also ==
- Amulet MS 5236
