= Herbert E. Brekle =

German typographer and linguist (1935–2018)

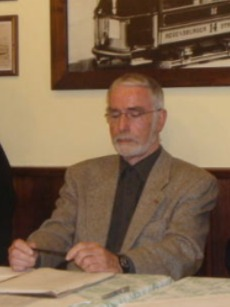
- Born: 11 June 1935; Stuttgart, Germany
- Died: 6 May 2018 (aged 82)
- Education: University of Tübingen
- Scientific career
- Fields: Typographer, linguist
- Workplaces: University of Regensburg

Herbert Ernst Brekle (11 June 1935 – 6 May 2018) was a German typographer and linguist. Brekle's main research interests were semantics, word formation theory, history of linguistics, history of Western alphabets and typography.

== Life ==
Brekle worked from 1951 to 1957 as a compositor, proofreader, and printer. He studied English philology, Romance studies and philosophy at the University of Tübingen from 1958 to 1963, and obtained his doctorate in 1963. In 1969, he achieved his habilitation also at the University of Tübingen, where he had been a research assistant at the department of English philology headed by Hans Marchand; in the years 1967–69, he was supported by a postdoctoral scholarship of the Deutsche Forschungsgemeinschaft.

In the same year, Brekle was appointed to the chair of general linguistics at the University of Regensburg, which he held until his retirement in 2001. In 1974/75, he was a visiting professor at McGill University in Montreal, Quebec, Canada, and ten years later at the Université de Paris VII (1984/85). From 1984 to 1986, Brekle also held the office of the chairman of the German Linguistic Society (Deutsche Gesellschaft für Sprachwissenschaft).

Parallel to his academic work, Brekle has also been active in politics and has held various political offices: In 1960/61, he chaired the General Students' Committee and the Baden-Württemberg branch of the Association of German student bodies (Verband Deutscher Studentenschaften). From 1972 to 1978 and again from 1990 to 1996, Brekle was member of the city council of Regensburg, and from 1978 to 1982 member of the district assembly (Bezirkstag) of Upper Palatinate. Between 1978 and 1986, he also served as chairman of the Regensburg county group of the Bavarian branch of the League for the environment and nature conservation (Bund Naturschutz in Bayern).

He died on 6 May 2018 at the age of 82.

== Works ==
- Generative Satzsemantik im System der englischen Nominalkomposition, 2nd ed., München 1976, ISBN 3-7705-1021-6
- Semantik. Eine Einführung in die sprachwissenschaftliche Bedeutungslehre, München 1972, ISBN 3-7705-1181-6
- Einführung in die Geschichte der Sprachwissenschaft, Darmstadt 1985, ISBN 3-534-08130-7
- Die Antiqualinie von ca. -1500 bis ca. +1500. Untersuchungen zur Morphogenese des westlichen Alphabets auf kognitivistischer Basis, Münster 1994, ISBN 3-89323-259-1
- Die Prüfeninger Weiheinschrift von 1119. Eine paläographisch-typographische Untersuchung, Scriptorium Verlag für Kultur und Wissenschaft, Regensburg 2005, ISBN 3-937527-06-0

== See also ==
- Altarpiece of Pellegrino II
- Amulet MS 5236
- Prüfening dedicatory inscription
- Roman lead pipe inscription
