= Ductus (linguistics) =

Aspect of speaking or writing

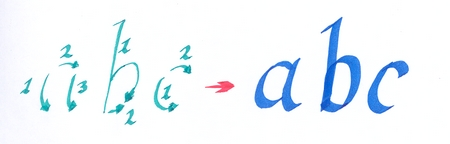
Example of the ductus of Latin letters

In linguistics, ductus is the qualities and characteristics of speaking or writing instantiated in the act of speaking or the flow of writing the text. For instance, in writing, ductus includes the direction, sequencing, and speed with which the strokes making up a character are drawn.

Unlike rhythm, ductus is the performative quality that emerges by actuating the metrically arranged language in voice. It is then the specific style and character of the language as it exists within time. While rhythm is tied to tempo, ductus picks up various features of performative language, such as pitch and tone as well.

It is for example possible to recognize people by their ductus.
