= Roman lead pipe inscription =

Latin inscription on a Roman water pipe

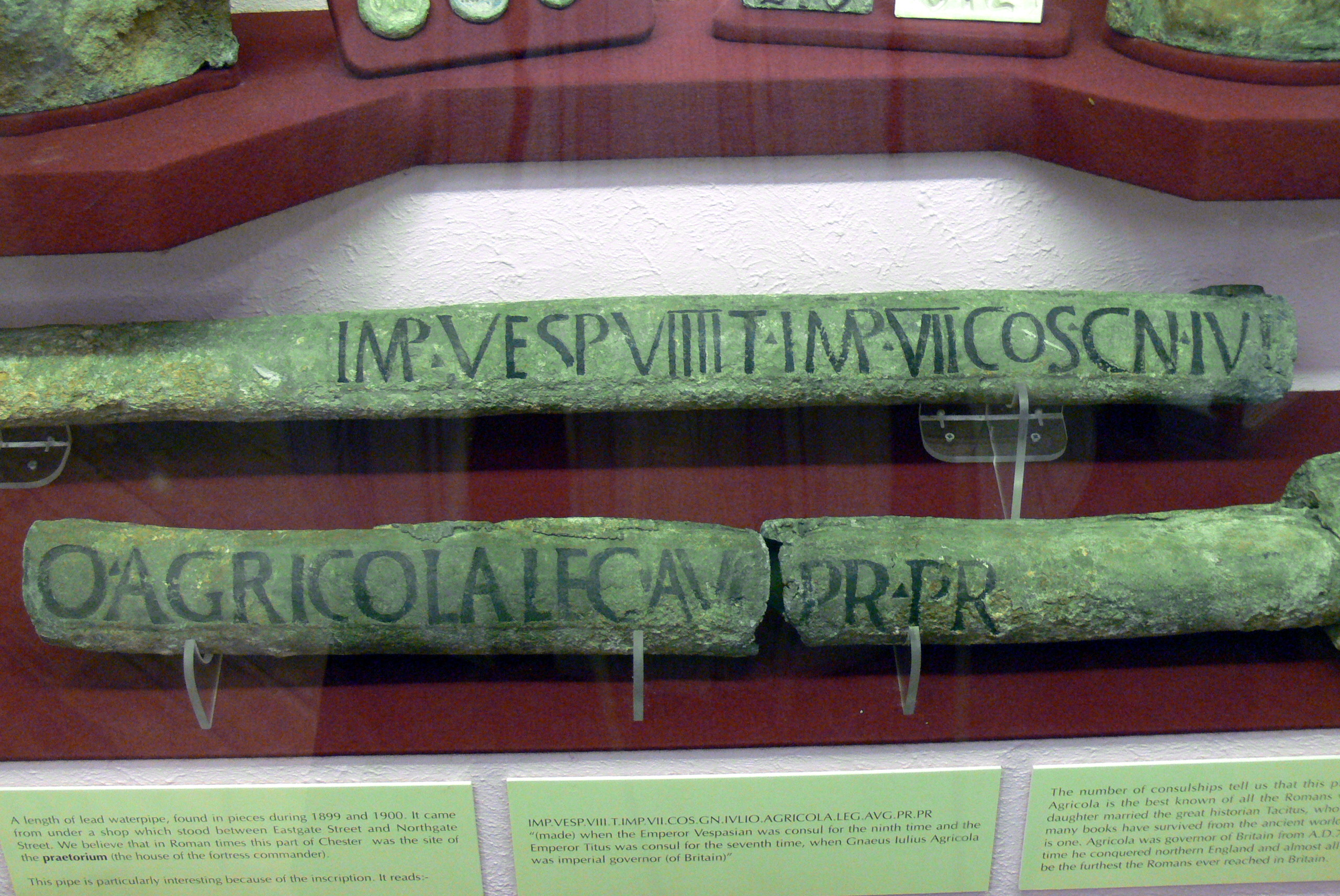
Water pipe with Latin inscription from the reign of Vespasian. The text is unusual for being sunk into the surface and its sizable length of 1 m.

A Roman lead pipe inscription is a Latin inscription on a Roman water pipe made of lead which provides brief information on its manufacturer and owner, often the reigning emperor himself as the supreme authority. The identification marks were created by full text stamps.

== Manufacture of pipes ==
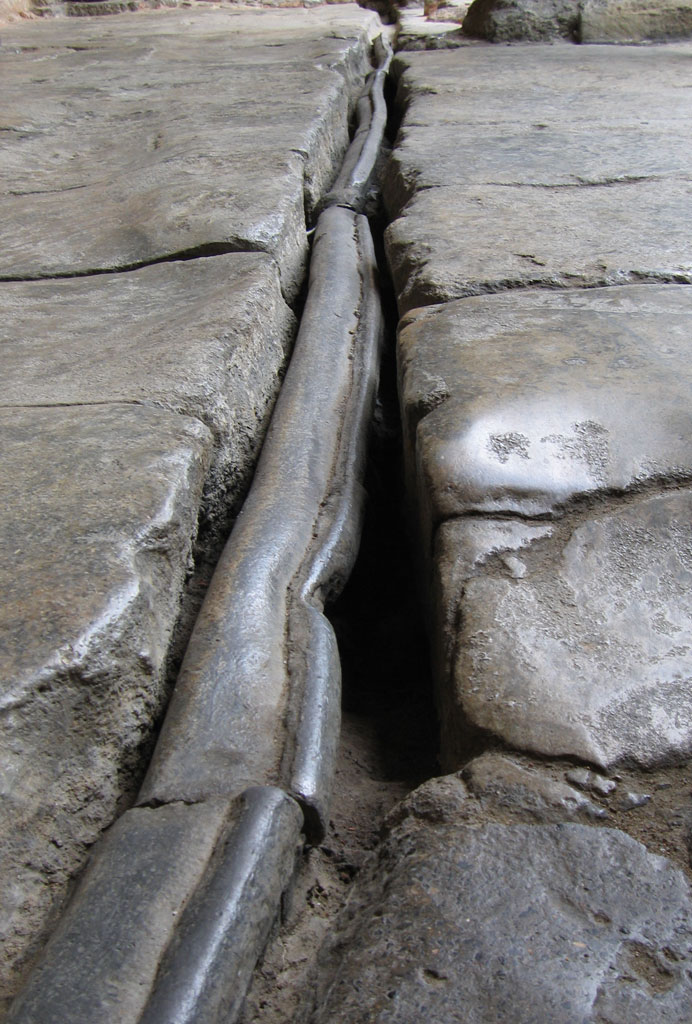
Uninscribed lead pipe with a folded seam, at the Roman thermae of Bath, England

Lead, a by-product of the ancient silver smelting process, was produced in the Roman Empire with an estimated peak production of 80,000 metric tons per year – a truly industrial scale. The metal was used along with other materials in the vast water supply network of the Romans for the manufacture of water pipes, particularly for urban plumbing.

The method of manufacturing the lead pipes is recorded by Vitruvius and Frontinus. The lead was poured into sheets of a uniform 3 m (10 ft) length, which were bent to form a cylinder and soldered at the seam. The lead pipes could range in size from approximately 1.3 to 57 cm (0.5 to 22.4 in) in diameter, depending on the required rate of flow.

== Creation of inscriptions ==
Since the 19th century, the hypothesis has occasionally been put forward that the Roman inscriptions were created by movable type printing. A recent investigation by the typesetter and linguist Herbert Brekle, however, concludes that all material evidence points to the use of common text stamps. Brekle describes the manufacturing method as follows:

A stamp (punch) which has the text carved in high-relief and in right reading is pressed into the slightly moist sand or clay of the mould, thus producing a reverse image of the text (matrix) in bas-relief. After the molten lead is poured out in the mould, the inscription appears raised in high-relief on the surface of the lead pipe. This is today considered the most plausible hypothesis for the creation of such inscriptions (full text stamp).

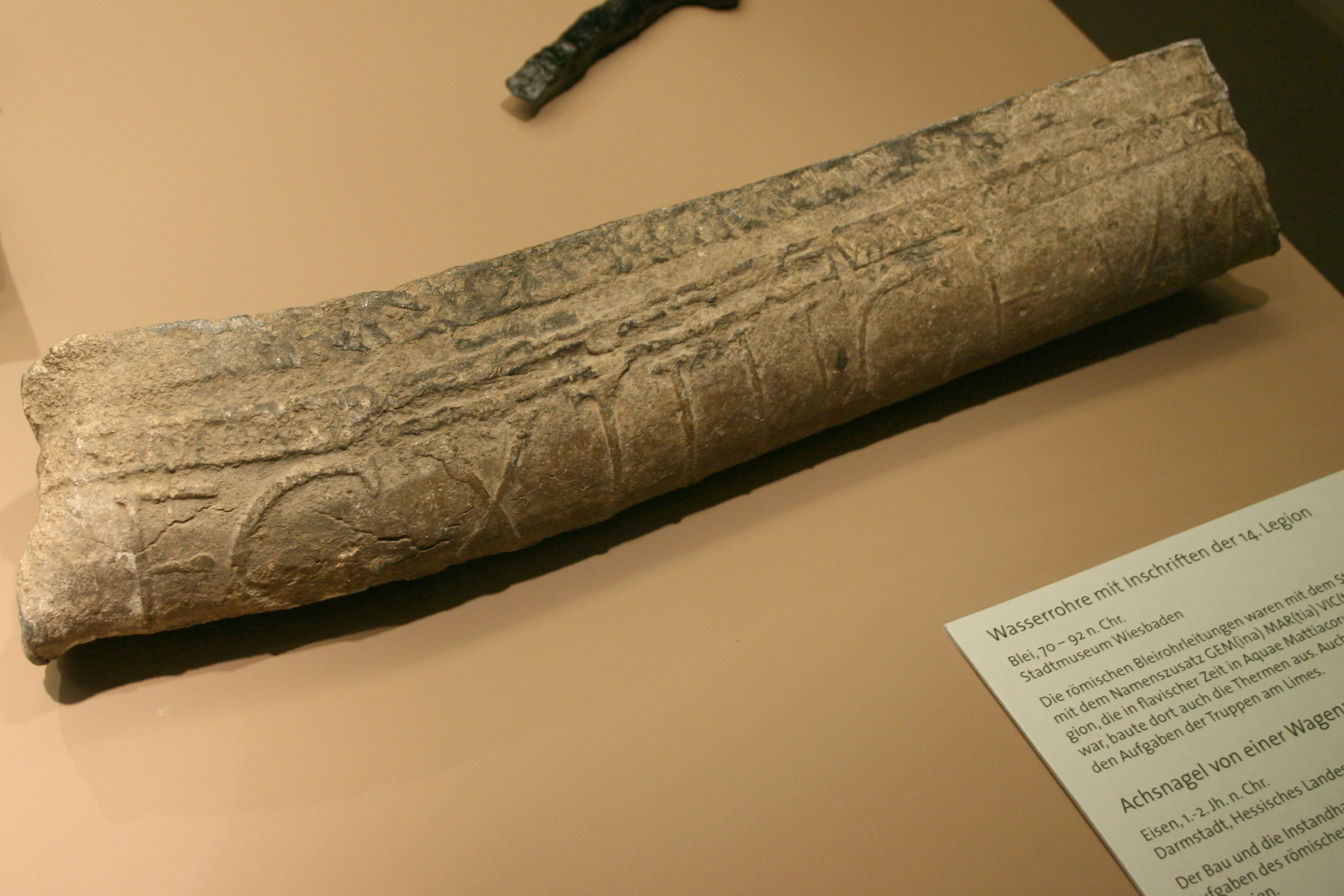
Lead pipe stamp of the Legio XIV Gemina

Brekle lists the following reasons for the employment of stamps and against that of movable type: for printing on lead sheets the way the Romans created them, it would be much more practical to use single stamp blocks than sets of individual letters, since the latter would be unstable and would have required a clamp or some similar mechanism to maintain the necessary cohesion. Neither impressions of such clamps nor of the fine lines between the individual letters typical for the use of movable type are discernible in the inscriptions. By contrast, the outer rim of one examined stamp block left a raised rectangular edge running around the inscription text, thus providing positive evidence for the use of such a printing device.

In addition, evidence of the poor positioning of movable type, such as individual letters tilting to the right or left or deviating from the baseline – something which could have been expected to occur at least in a few extant specimens – is notably absent. In those inscriptions where the letters are not properly aligned, the entire text is blurred, which clearly points to the use of full text stamps. Finally, it needs to be considered that archaeological excavations have never unearthed ancient sets of movable type, whereas moulds with reversed inscription texts for stamp printing have indeed been recovered.

== See also ==
- Plumbing
- Roman aqueduct

== Sources ==
- Brekle, Herbert E. (2010), "Herstellungstechniken von Inschriften auf römischen Wasserleitungsrohren aus Blei", in Hanneforth, Thomas; Fanselow, Gisbert (eds.), Language and Logos. Studies in Theoretical and Computational Linguistics, studia grammatica, vol. 72, Berlin: Akademie Verlag, pp. 419–437, ISBN 978-3-05-004931-1
- Grewe, Klaus (1985), Planung und Trassierung römischer Wasserleitungen, Wiesbaden: Chmielorz, ISBN 3-87124-025-7
- Hodge, A. Trevor (1992), Roman Aqueducts & Water Supply, London: Duckworth, ISBN 0-7156-2194-7
- Hong, Sungmin; Candelone, Jean-Pierre; Patterson, Clair C.; Boutron, Claude F. (1994), "Greenland Ice Evidence of Hemispheric Lead Pollution Two Millennia Ago by Greek and Roman Civilizations", Science, 265 (5180): 1841–1843, Bibcode:1994Sci...265.1841H, doi:10.1126/science.265.5180.1841, PMID 17797222, S2CID 45080402
- Lanciani, R.: "Topografia di Roma antica. I commentarii di Frontino intorno le acque e gli acquedotti. Silloge epigrafica aquaria", in: Memorie della Reale Accademia dei Lincei, Serie III, Volume IV, Classe di Scienze Morali, Rom 1881 (Reprint: Quasar publishing house, 1975), pp. 215–616
- Pace, Pietrantonio (1986), Gli acquedotti di Roma e il Aquaeductu di Frontino (2nd ed.), Rome: Art Studio S. Eligio
