= Cividale del Friuli =

Cividale del Friuli Zividât (Friulian)
- Comune
- Comune di Cividale del Friuli
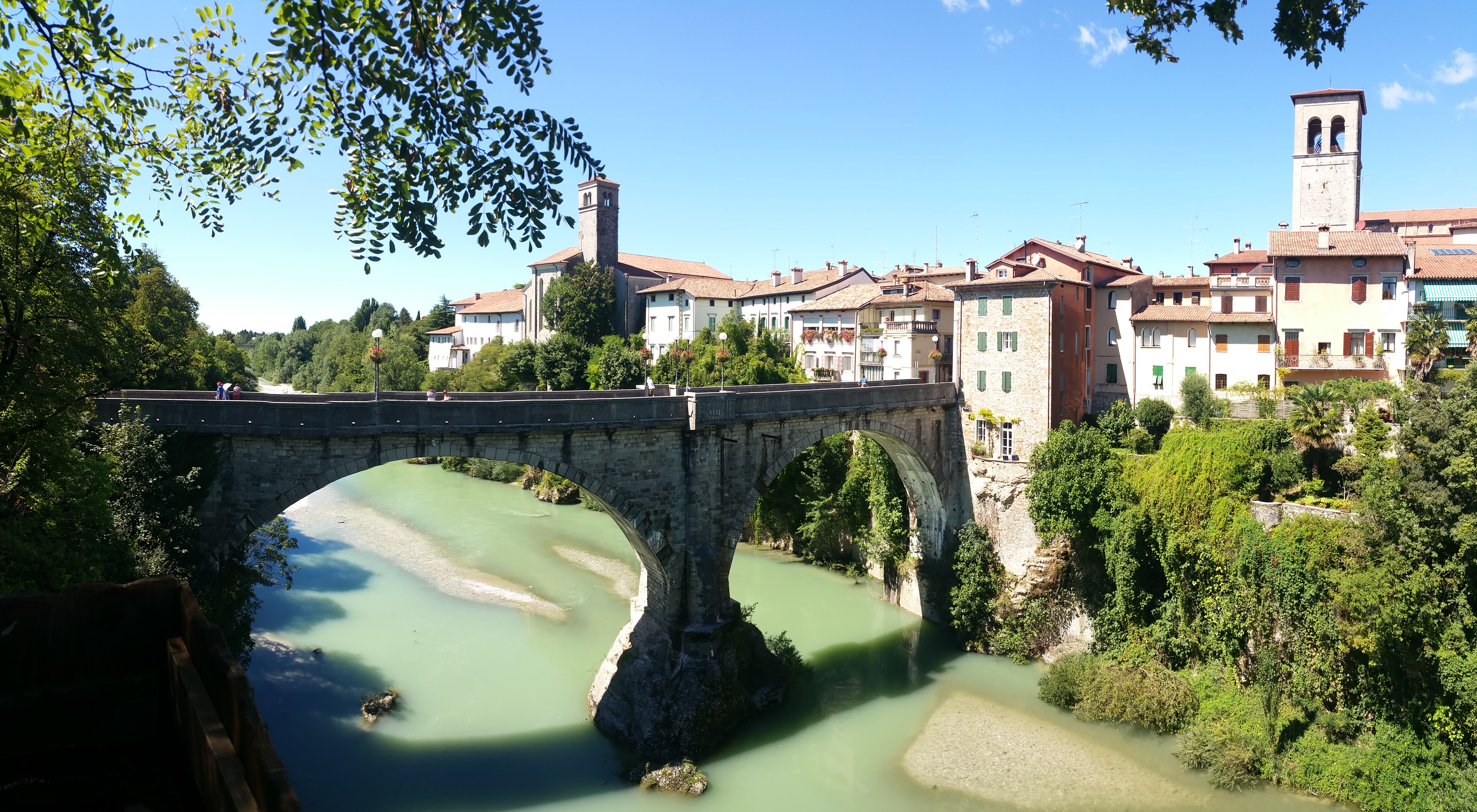

- Location within Friuli-Venezia Giulia Location within Italy
- Coordinates: 46°06′N 13°26′E
- Country: Italy
- Region: Friuli-Venezia Giulia
- Province: Udine (UD)
- Frazioni: Rualis, Grupignano, Rubignacco, Gagliano, Purgessimo, Sanguarzo, Spessa, Carraria, Fornalis, San Giorgio

Government
  - Mayor: Daniela Bernardi (UDC, Lega Nord, PDL)

Area
  - Total: 50 km^{2} (19 sq mi)
- Elevation: 135 m (443 ft)

Population (2007)
  - Total: 11,547
  - Density: 230/km^{2} (600/sq mi)
- Demonym: Cividalesi
- Time zone: UTC+1 (CET)
  - Summer (DST): UTC+2 (CEST)
- Postal code: 33043
- Dialing code: 0432
- ISTAT code: 030026
- Patron saint: San Donato
- Saint day: August 21
- Website: Official website

Cividale del Friuli (Friulian: Cividât, locally Zividât; German: Östrich; Slovene: Čedad) is a town and comune (municipality) in the Regional decentralization entity of Udine, part of the North-Italian region of Friuli-Venezia Giulia. The town lies 135 metres (443 ft) above sea-level in the foothills of the eastern Alps, 15 kilometres (9 mi) by rail from the city of Udine and close to the Slovenian border. It is situated on the river Natisone, which forms a picturesque ravine here. Formerly an important regional power, it is today a quiet, small town that attracts tourists thanks to its medieval center.

== History ==
Ponte del Diavolo, the Devil's Bridge

Archaeological findings reveal that the area was already inhabited in Paleolithic and Neolithic times. During the Iron Age the region was settled by Veneti and Celts. Due to the location's strategic position on the northeastern frontier of Roman Italy, in 50 BC, the Romans founded there a castrum, which afterwards was transformed by Julius Caesar into a forum and its name changed into Forum Iulii ("Julius' marketplace"; Fréjus had the same Roman name). Not long afterward, the forum became a municipium and its citizens were inscribed in the Roman tribe Scaptia.

After the destruction of Aquileia and Iulium Carnicum (Zuglio) in 452 AD, Forum Iulii became the chief town of the district of Friuli and gave its name to it. In 568 the city was the first major centre occupied by Alboin's Lombard invasion of Italy, then part of the Byzantine Empire. The city was chosen as first capital of the newly formed Lombard Kingdom, then granted by Alboin to his nephew Gisulf as the capital of a Lombard Duchy of Friuli. After the Lombards were defeated by the Franks, (774), following the last Lombard resistance under Hrodgaud of Friuli (776) Forum Julii changed its name to Civitas Austriae, Charlemagne's Italian "City of the East".

Under the Carolingian settlement with the Papacy, the patriarchs of Aquileia resided here from 773 to 1031, when they returned to Aquileia, and finally in 1238 removed to Udine. This last change of residence was the origin of the antagonism between Cividale and Udine, which was only terminated by their surrender to Venice in 1419 and 1420 respectively. When the Patriarchal State of Friuli was founded in 1077, Cividale was chosen as the capital.

According to James Burke, a 1331 siege of Cividale was one of the first deployments of what we would now call cannons, in the early form known as a bombard. Between July and September 1409, a church council was held at Cividale by Pope Gregory XII (Roman Obedience). It was poorly attended and achieved nothing. In 1420 Cividale was annexed to the Republic of Venice. After the Napoleonic Wars Cividale became part of the Kingdom of Lombardy–Venetia. It was ceded to Kingdom of Italy in 1866.

== Main sights ==
Piazza Paolo Diacono

The historical center of the town is dominated by Piazza del Duomo, which is where the National Archaeological Museum of Cividale del Friuli is located. Close by is the Palazzo dei Provveditori Veneti, constructed in 1565 and designed by Andrea Palladio. The town is split in two by the Natisone River, which is spanned by the Devil's Bridge (15th century, rebuilt in 1918). The Celtic Hypogeum is a subterranean series of halls carved in the rock in ancient times, whose destination remains unclear: uses as either Celtic funerary monument or a Roman (Lombard) jail has been proposed.

The Cathedral (Duomo) was built in the 15th century over a pre-existing construction built in the 8th century. It is a Venetian Gothic building, finished in the 16th century by architect Pietro Lombardo, featuring interventions from the 18th century also. The interior houses an altar dedicated to the Madonna, in the right aisle, and the altarpiece of patriarch Pellegrino II (1195−1204), a silver retable which had been inscribed in Latin by the means of individual letter punches, 250 years before the invention of modern movable type printing by Johannes Gutenberg.

The Christian Museum annexed to the Duomo houses outstanding examples of Lombard sculpture. It contains some interesting relics of the art of the 8th century. The cathedral contains an octagonal marble canopy with sculptures in relief, with a font below it belonging to the 8th century, but altered later. The high altar has a fine silver altar front of 1185. The museum contains various Roman and Lombard antiquities, and works of art in gold, silver and ivory formerly belonging to the cathedral chapter. The fine 15th-century Ponte del Diavolo leads to the church of S. Martino, which contains an altar of the 8th century with reliefs executed by order of the Lombard king Ratchis.

The small church of Oratorio di Santa Maria in Valle (also known as Lombard Temple), next to the Natisone river, is a notable example of High Middle Ages art sometimes attributed to the 8th century, but probably later. Included in the old Lombard quarter, it was probably used as Palatine Chapel by the Lombard dukes and king's functionaries. The fine decorations, statues and stuccoes (11th or 12th century) housed in the interior, show a strong Byzantine influence.

In the collegiata, the altarpiece of Pellegrinus II (1195−1204) is a silver retable which had been inscribed in Latin by the means of individual letter punches, 250 years before the invention of modern movable type printing by Johannes Gutenberg. On 25 June 2011 a part of the historical centre of Cividale (the one belonging to the Lombards era) entered the UNESCO heritage list.

== Tradition and Folklore ==
On 6 January residents celebrate the Messa dello Spadone (Mass of the Broadsword), a religious rite observed with an historical reenactment of Patriarch Marquard of Randeck’s arrival in Cividale in 1366.

=== Game of Truc ===
The game of Truc is an old game played by children and adults on Easter and the Monday following Easter (called Pasquetta, or Little Easter). A manuscript preserved in the National Archaeology Museum of Cividale del Friuli traces the game back to the 18th century. While Truc is exclusive to the central squares of Cividale, a similar game is played in Venice and in Emilia Romagna (Italy). An Easter game played in Lusatia (Germany) called Waleien also has similar rules to Truc.

The game takes place in a large, round basin made of sand with a ramp leading into it. Players roll colored hard-boiled eggs and, according to precise rules, aim to touch the other eggs rolled into the basin for a number of points. The game’s name is an onomatopoeia imitating the sound the eggs make when they touch.

== Other attractions ==
The town has a number of small osterias which serve distinctive local wines. Of particular note are Tocai friulano, Verduzzo and Refosco dal peduncolo rosso.

== Transport ==
The town is easily accessible by rail and bus from Udine and by bus from Gorizia.

== Famous residents ==
Famous residents of Cividale del Friuli include:

- Andrea di Bertholotti (fl. 15th century), painter
- Paulus Diaconus (c. 722–799), historian of the Lombards in the time of Charlemagne
- Berengar I (c. 845–924), King of Italy and Holy Roman Emperor
- Antonio Dugoni (1827–1874), painter
- Adelaide Ristori (1822–1906), actress
- Antonio da Cividale (fl. 1392–1421), composer
- Fiore dei Liberi (c. 1350–1420), master of arms
- Roberto Chiacig (born 1974), professional basketball player
- Vittorio Podrecca (1883–1959), impresario and puppet theatre director
- Eugenio Cefis (1921–2004), chairman of ENI (petrochemical) and Montedison (chemical)
- Lorenzo Crisetig (born 1993), football player

== See also ==
- Slavia Friulana

== Sources ==
- Koch, Walter (1994), Literaturbericht zur mittelalterlichen und neuzeitlichen Epigraphik (1985−1991), Monumenta Germaniae Historica: Hilfsmittel, vol. 14, München, p. 213, ISBN 978-3-88612-114-4
- Lipinsky, Angelo (1986), "La pala argentea del Patriarca Pellegrino nella Collegiata di Cividale e le sue iscrizioni con caratteri mobili", Ateneo Veneto, 24: 75–80
