= Letterform =

Term to refer to a letter's shape

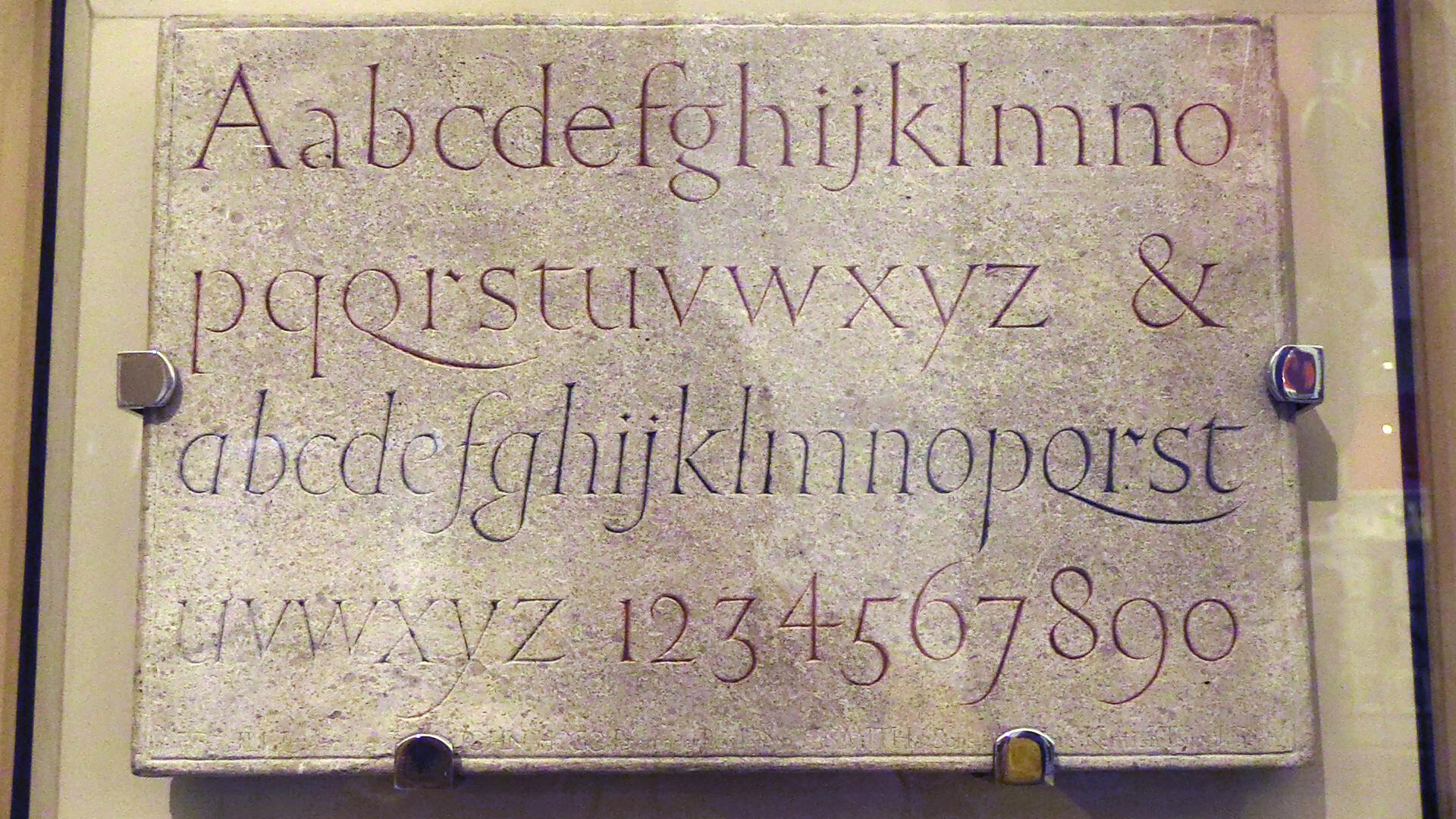
Alphabets and Numerals (1909). Letters carved by Eric Gill for a book, "Manuscript and Inscription Letters for Schools and Classes and for the Use of Craftsmen" (Edward Johnston 1909). He later gave them to the Victoria and Albert Museum so they could be used by students at the Royal College of Art.

A letterform, letter-form or letter form is a term used especially in typography, palaeography, calligraphy and epigraphy to mean a letter's shape. A letterform is a type of glyph, which is a specific, concrete way of writing an abstract character or grapheme.

For example, medieval scholars may discuss the particular handwritten letterforms that distinguish one script from another.

The history of letterforms is discussed in fields of study relating to materials used in writing. Epigraphy includes the study of letterforms carved in stone or other permanent materials. Palaeography is the study of writing in ancient and medieval manuscripts. Calligraphy treats the letterforms of decorative writing, usually in ink. In the field of typography, type design is the process of designing typefaces that consist of sets of letterforms for use with metal print or computer. More broadly, letterforms may be discussed wherever letters appear stylistically—in graffiti for example.

== In context ==
- Letterforms in alphabets: Arabic alphabet, Cyrillic script
- Letterforms in calligraphy: Man'yōgana, Hentaigana
- Letterforms in history: Long s, R rotunda
- Letterforms in technology: Typeface, Computer printer

== See also ==
- Glyph – Purposeful written mark
- Grammatology – Study of graphemes and writing systems
- Graphemics – Study of graphemes and writing systems
- Sort (typesetting) – Character printing block
- Typeface anatomy – Graphic components of typeface letters
- Writing system – Convention of symbols representing language
