= King of Italy =

Title of Italian monarchs from 1861 to 1946

- Re d'Italia

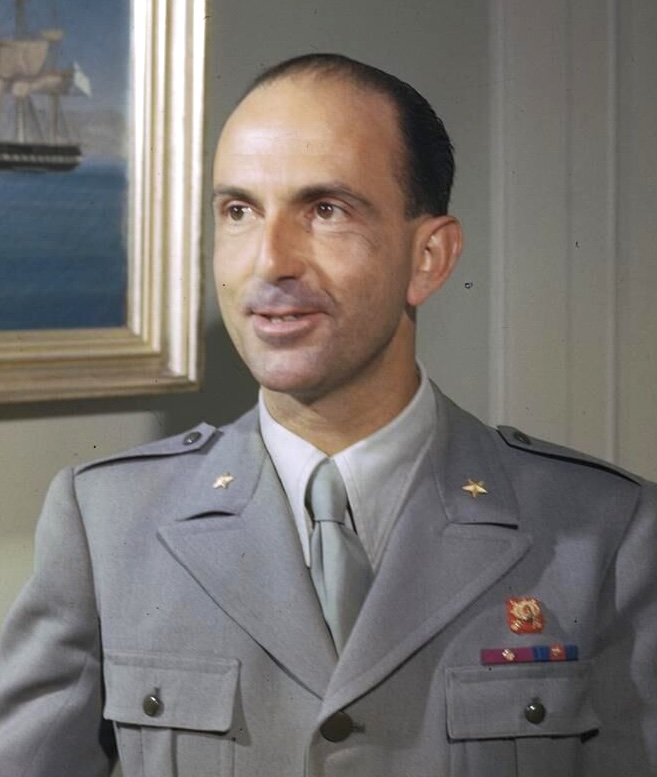
- Last to reign Umberto II; 9 May – 12 June 1946

Details
- Style: His Majesty
- First monarch: Odoacer
- Last monarch: Umberto II
- Formed: 4 September 476; 1550 years ago
- Abolished: 12 June 1946; 80 years ago
- Residence: Quirinal Palace
- Pretenders: Disputed: Emanuele Filiberto, Prince of Venice; Prince Aimone, Duke of Aosta

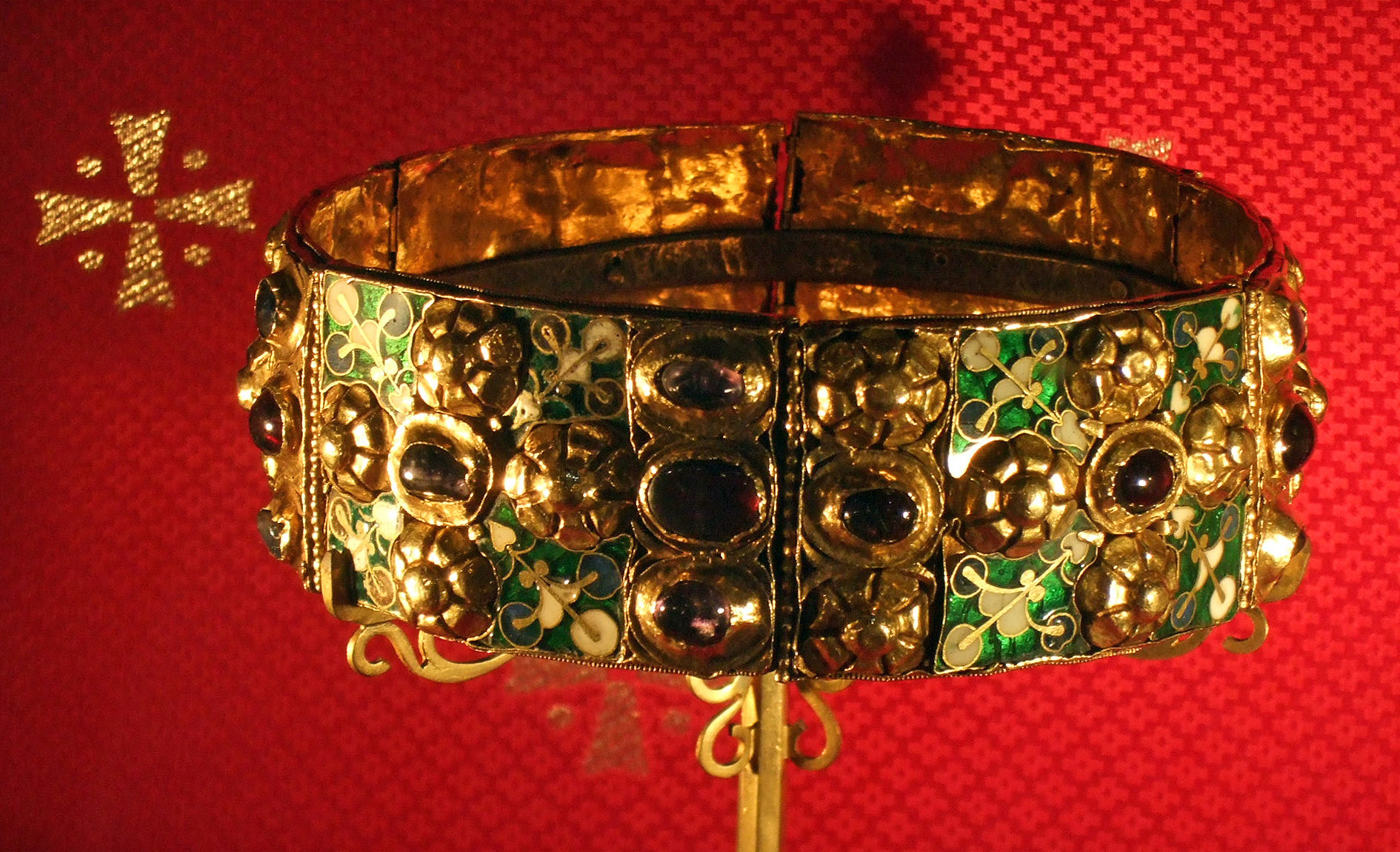
For centuries, the Iron Crown of Lombardy was used in the coronation of the King of Italy.

King of Italy (Italian: Re d'Italia; Latin: Rex Italiae) was the title given to the ruler of the Kingdom of Italy after the fall of the Western Roman Empire. The first who might have taken the title (he might have styled himself as dux only) was Odoacer, a barbarian warlord, in the late 5th century, followed by the Ostrogothic kings up to the mid-6th century. With the Frankish conquest of Italy in the 8th century, the Carolingians assumed the title, which was maintained by subsequent Holy Roman Emperors throughout the Middle Ages. The last Emperor to claim the title was Charles V in the 16th century. During this period, the holders of the title were crowned with the Iron Crown of Lombardy.

A Kingdom of Italy was restored from 1805 to 1814 with Napoleon as its only king, centred in Northern Italy. Not until the Italian unification in the 1860s was an independent Kingdom of Italy covering the entire Italian Peninsula restored. From 1861 the House of Savoy held the title of King of Italy until the last king, Umberto II, was exiled in 1946 when Italy became a republic.

== History ==
After the deposition of the last Western Emperor in 476, Odoacer was appointed Dux Italiae (Duke of Italy) by the reigning Byzantine Emperor Zeno. Later, the Germanic foederati, the Scirians and the Heruli, as well as a large segment of the Italic Roman army, proclaimed Odoacer Rex Italiae ('King of Italy). In 493, the Ostrogothic king Theoderic the Great killed Odoacer, and set up a new dynasty of kings of Italy. Ostrogothic rule ended when Italy was reconquered by the Byzantine Empire in 552.

In 568, the Lombards entered the peninsula and ventured to recreate a barbarian kingdom in opposition to the Empire, establishing their authority over much of Italy, except the Exarchate of Ravenna and the duchies of Rome, Venetia, Naples and the southernmost portions. In the 8th century, estrangement between the Italians and the Byzantines allowed the Lombards to capture the remaining Roman enclaves in northern Italy. However, in 774, they were defeated by the Franks under Charlemagne, who deposed their king and took up the title "king of the Lombards". After the death of Charles the Fat in 887, Italy fell into instability and a number of kings attempted to establish themselves as independent Italian monarchs. During this period, known as the Feudal Anarchy (888–962), the title Rex Italicorum ("King of the Italians" or "King of the Italics") was introduced. After the breakup of the Frankish Empire, Otto I added Italy to the Holy Roman Empire and continued the use of the title Rex Italicorum. The last to use this title was Henry II (1004–1024). Subsequent emperors used the title "King of Italy" until Charles V. They were crowned in Pavia, Milan and Bologna.

In 1805, Napoleon was crowned with the Iron Crown of Lombardy at the Milan Cathedral. The next year, Holy Roman Emperor Francis II abdicated his imperial title. From the deposition of Napoleon (1814) until the unification of Italy (1861), there was no Italian monarch claiming the overarching title. The Risorgimento successfully established the House of Savoy dynasty over the whole peninsula and, uniting the kingdoms of Sardinia and the Two Sicilies, it formed the modern Kingdom of Italy. The monarchy was superseded by the Italian Republic, after a institutional referendum was held on 2 June 1946, after World War II. The Italian monarchy formally ended on 12 June of that year and Umberto II left the country.

== Kingdom of Odoacer (476–493) ==
Initially named Dux Italiae (Duke of Italy) by Zeno, the Roman Emperor in Constantinople, he later was recognized as King of Italy by the foederati in control of the Italian peninsula. He was deposed by the Ostrogoths, who established their own kingdom.

Image	Name	Life	Coronation	Ceased to be King
	Odoacer	c. 433 – 15 March 493 AD	4 September 476	15 March 493

== Ostrogothic Kingdom (493–553) ==
Theodoric the Great was invited by the emperor Zeno to take Italy from Odoacer and rule it in Zeno's name. He defeated Odoacer in 493, establishing a new kingdom in place of Odoacer's. Officially, the Ostrogothic kings ruled the Roman citizens in Italy as a viceroy of the Roman emperors, and their own Gothic people as their king, though functionally they ran their kingdom entirely independently from the Roman authority in Constantinople. Their greatest extent was during Theodoric's reign; as Roman Emperors from the east began to exert more power and retake control of Roman territory, the last Ostrogothic king fell to the Emperor Justinian in 553.

Image	Name	Life	Coronation	Ceased to be King
	Theodoric the Great	454 – 30 August 526	15 March 493	30 August 526
	Athalaric	c. 516 – 2 October 534	526	2 October 534
	Queen Amalasuintha	495 – 30 April 535	2 October 534	30 April 535
	Theodahad	c. 480 – December 536	535	December 536
	Vitiges	? – 542	536	540
	Ildibad	? – 541	540	541
	Eraric	? – 541	541	541
	Totila	? – 1 July 552	541	1 July 552
	Teia	? – 552/553	552	552/553

== Interregnum (527–578) ==
Byzantine Roman authority in Italy was briefly re-established under Justinian, though his gains were lost under his successor Justin II, after a new Germanic tribe, the Lombards, invaded from the north and established their kingdom in 568.

Image	Name	Life	Coronation	Ceased to be King
	Justinian I	482 – 14 November 565	1 April 527	14 November 565
	Justin II	?– 5 October 578	14 November 565	5 October 578

== Kingdom of the Lombards (568–774) ==
The Lombards under Alboin established their kingdom in the extreme north of Italy in 568, gradually pushing the Byzantine Romans back from the peninsula until only the Exarchate of Ravenna remained under Roman control. This finally fell in the 750s, with the Lombards gaining control of most of the peninsula. The last Lombard King of Italy, Desiderius, was deposed by his son-in-law Charlemagne, who folded it into the larger Carolingian Empire, which evolved over time into the Holy Roman Empire.

Image	Name	Life	Coronation	Ceased to be King
	Alboin	530s – 28 June 572	568	572
	Cleph	? – 574	572	574
	Rule of the Dukes (interregnum)	574 – 584	574	584
	Authari	c. 550 – 5 September 590	584	September 590
	Agilulf	c. 555 – April 616	591	616
	Adaloald	602-628	c. 616	626
	Arioald	? – 636	626	636
	Rothari	606 – 652	636	652
	Rodoald	630– 653	652	653
	Aripert I	? – 661	653	661
Perctarit	Perctarit & Godepert	? – 668	661	662
	Grimoald	610 – 671	662	671
	Garibald	655 - 671	671	671
	Perctarit (restored)	? – 688	671	688
	Alahis	680 – 689	688	689
	Cunincpert	? – 700	689	700
	Liutpert	?– 702	700	701
	Raginpert	? - 701	701	701
	Aripert II	? – 712	701	712
	Ansprand	657 -712	712	712
	Liutprand	680 – 744	712	744
	Hildeprand	?- 744	744	744
	Ratchis	? – 749	744	749
	Aistulf	? – 756	749	756
	Desiderius	c. 720 – c. 786	756	774

== Kingdom of Italy (781–962) ==
=== Carolingian Dynasty (774–887) ===
Charlemagne ruled over northern Italy as King of the Lombards. In 781, he named his son Pepin as King of Italy, though he still maintained suzerainty over the land. Charlemagne was crowned Roman Emperor in 800, while the Kingdom of Italy became one of the constituent kingdoms of the Empire. Beginning with Louis the Pious in 818, the Kingdom was ruled directly by the Carolingian Emperor himself.

Image	Name	Life	Coronation	Ceased to be King
	Charles I (Charlemagne)	2 April 748 – 28 January 814	June 774	28 January 814
	Pepin	777 – 8 July 810	781	8 July 810
	Bernard	797 – 17 April 818	c. July 810	late 817
	Lothair I	795 – 29 September 855	17 April 818	29 September 855
	Louis II	825 – 12 August 875	15 June 844	12 August 875
	Charles II	13 June 823 – 6 October 877	25 December 875	6 October 877
	Carloman	830 – 22 March 880	877	879
	Charles III the Fat	839 – 13 January 888	12 April 880	November 887

After 887, Italy fell into instability, with many rulers claiming the kingship simultaneously.

=== Unruochings (887–896) ===
Image	Name	Life	Coronation	Ceased to be King
	Berengar I	c. 845 – 7 April 924	c. 888	c. 896 (first reign)

Berengar was deposed by the King of East Francia, Arnulf of Carinthia, in the mid-890s.

=== Widonids (claimants) (887–898) ===
Image	Name	Life	Coronation	Ceased to be King
	Guy	c. 845 – 12 December 894	February 889	12 December 894
	Lambert	c. 880 – 15 October 898	30 April 892	896 (first reign)

=== Carolingian Dynasty (restored) (894–896) ===
Image	Name	Life	Coronation	Ceased to be King
	Arnulf	c. 850 – 8 December 899	894 (as claimant)	896
	Ratold	fl. 896	c. 896	896

In 896, Arnulf and Ratold lost control of Italy, which was divided between Lambert of Italy and Berengar I of Italy.

=== Widonids (restored) (896–898) ===
Image	Name	Life	Coronation	Ceased to be King
	Lambert	c. 880 – 15 October 898	30 April 892	15 October 898 (second reign)

After Lambert's death, Berengar I took his territory and reunified Italy.

=== Unruochings (restored) (896–924) ===
Image	Name	Life	Coronation	Ceased to be King
	Berengar I	c. 845 – 7 April 924	c. 888	7 April 924 (second reign)

=== Bivinids (Carolingian by adoption) (901–905) ===
In 900, Louis III, a grandson of Louis II of Italy, was invited into Italy as their king by nobles in opposition to Berengar I.

Image	Name	Life	Coronation	Ceased to be King
	Louis III	c. 880 – 5 June 928	February 901	before 21 April 905

=== Elder House of Welf (922–926) ===
Image	Name	Life	Coronation	Ceased to be King
	Rudolph	c. 885 – 13 July 937	922	926

=== Bosonids (926–950) ===
Image	Name	Life	Coronation	Ceased to be King
	Hugh	c. 880 – 10 April 948	926	947
	Lothair II	c. 927 – 22 November 950	947	22 November 950

=== Anscarids (950–961) ===
Image	Name	Life	Coronation	Ceased to be King
	Berengar II	c. 900 – 4 August 966	November 950	c. 25 December 961
	Adalbert	c. 934-c. 973	November 950	c. 25 December 961

In 951 Otto I invaded Italy and was crowned with the Iron Crown of Lombardy. In 952, Berengar and Adalbert became his vassals but remained kings until being deposed by Otto.

== Holy Roman Empire (962–1556) ==
Otto is considered to be the founding emperor of the Holy Roman Empire, and the Kingdom of Italy was considered one of the constituent realms of the Empire. Beginning in the 12th century, states such as the Republic of Venice and the Papal States captured more and more territory from the Kingdom of Italy, and the Empire's territory on the Peninsula shrunk over time. After Charles V, the emperors stopped being crowned with the Iron Crown of Lombardy and the Italian title fell into disuse. Imperial control in Italy receded to Trent and South Tyrol until the dissolution of the Empire in 1806. Southern Italy had never been part of the Holy Roman Empire; it remained initially under the control of various Byzantine fiefs until the Norman Kingdom of Sicily (later the Kingdom of Naples) took control of the area in the 11th century. Central Italy, along the Rome-Ravenna axis, was part of the Papal States, under the direct personal rule of the pope. The Duke of Savoy was de jure a vassal of the Holy Roman Emperor, with the Duke being Prince and Perpetual Vicar of the Holy Roman Empire.

=== Ottonian dynasty (962–1024) ===
Image	Name	Life	Coronation	Ceased to be King
	Otto I	23 November 912 – 7 May 973	962	7 May 973
	Otto II	955 – 7 December 983	c. October 980 (Note: According to Sismondi 1906, p. 29, although Otto II was crowned King of the Romans in 961 and Holy Roman Emperor in 967, he only obtained the Iron Crown at Pavia in late 980, during his descent into Italy, and prior to his celebrating Christmas at Ravenna.)	7 December 983
	Otto III	980 – 23 January 1002	c. February 996 (Note: Although Otto III was crowned Holy Roman Emperor at Rome on 21 May 996, he was crowned King of Italy at Milan prior to the death of Pope John XV in early March 996 – see Comyn 1841, p. 123)	23 January 1002
	Arduin	955–1015	1002	1014
	Henry II (Note: Enumerated as successor of Henry I who was German King 919–936 but not Emperor.)	6 May 973 – 13 July 1024	1004	13 July 1024

=== Salian dynasty (1027–1125) ===
Image	Name	Life	Coronation	Ceased to be King
	Conrad I (Note: Enumerated as successor of Conrad I who was German King 911–918 but not Emperor.)	990 – 4 June 1039	1026	4 June 1039
	Henry III	29 October 1017 – 5 October 1056	1039	5 October 1056
	Henry IV	11 November 1050 – 7 August 1106	1056	December 1105
	Conrad II of Italy	1074–1101	1093	1101
	Henry V	8 November 1086 – 23 May 1125	1106	23 May 1125

=== Süpplingenburg dynasty (1125–1137) ===
Image	Name	Life	Coronation	Ceased to be King
	Lothair III	9 June 1075 – 4 December 1137	1125	4 December 1137

=== House of Hohenstaufen (1128–1197) ===
Image	Coat of Arms	Name	Life	Coronation	Ceased to be King
		Conrad III	1093 – 15 February 1152	1138 (also crowned in 1128 in opposition to Lothair)	1152
		Frederick I	1122 – 10 June 1190	1154	1186
		Henry VI	November 1165 – 28 September 1197	1186	28 September 1197

=== House of Welf (1208–1212) ===
Image	Coat of Arms	Name	Life	Coronation	Ceased to be King
		Otto IV	1175 or 1176 – 19 May 1218	1209	1212

=== House of Hohenstaufen (1212–1254) ===
Image	Coat of Arms	Name	Life	Coronation	Ceased to be King
		Frederick II (Friedrich II)	26 December 1194 – 13 December 1250	5 December 1212	13 December 1250
		Henry (Heinrich (VII))	1211 – 12 February 1242	23 April 1220	12 February 1242
		Conrad IV (Konrad IV)	25 April 1228 – 21 May 1254	May 1237	21 May 1254

=== House of Luxembourg (1311–1313) ===
Image	Coat of Arms	Name	Life	Coronation	Ceased to be King
		Henry VII	1275 – 24 August 1313	6 January 1311	24 August 1313

=== House of Wittelsbach (1327–1347) ===
Image	Coat of Arms	Name	Life	Coronation	Ceased to be King
		Louis IV	1 April 1282 – 11 October 1347	1327	11 October 1347

=== House of Luxembourg (1355–1437) ===
Image	Coat of Arms	Name	Life	Coronation	Ceased to be King
		Charles IV	14 May 1316 – 29 November 1378	1355	29 November 1378
		Sigismund	14 February 1368 – 9 December 1437	1431	9 December 1437

=== House of Habsburg (1437–1801) ===
Image	Coat of Arms	Name	Life	Coronation	Ceased to be King
		Frederick III	21 September 1415 – 19 August 1493	16 March 1452	19 August 1493
		Charles V	24 February 1500 – 21 September 1558	24 February 1530	16 January 1556

Charles V was the last emperor to be crowned king of Italy. The Habsburg emperors claimed the Italian crown until 1801. The empire continued to include Italian territories until its dissolution in 1806. Between 1815 and 1866, the House of Habsburg-Lorraine used the title King of Lombardy-Venetia.

== Kingdom of Italy as a client state of France, House of Bonaparte (1805–1814) ==
In 1805, Napoleon established a client state in northern Italy, named the Kingdom of Italy. He established himself as King of Italy, in personal union with his role as Emperor of the French. This client state did not survive the end of the Napoleonic era; in its place, the Congress of Vienna established a number of independent duchies and kingdoms in the region.

Image	Coat of Arms	Name	Life	Coronation	Ceased to be King
		Napoleon I	15 August 1769 – 5 May 1821	17 March 1805	11 April 1814

=== Full title ===
This title is present in Italian laws proclaimed by Napoleon I:

[Name], by the Grace of God and the Constitutions, Emperor of the French and King of Italy.

== Kingdom of Italy, House of Savoy (1861–1946) ==
During and after the Revolutions of 1848, sentiment on the peninsula grew for the establishment of a unified Italian kingdom. Southern Italy had not been united with northern Italy since the early medieval period, being mostly under the rule of the Kingdom of Naples and the Kingdom of the Two Sicilies. Northern Italy, in the early 19th century, came under the domination of the Kingdom of Sardinia, which besides its namesake island, also ruled the expansive Piedmont and Savoy regions along the French-Italian borderlands. The formerly republican leader in southern Italy, Giuseppe Garibaldi, made common cause with the House of Savoy to overthrow the Kingdom of the Two Sicilies, and the people voted in a plebiscite to join Sardinia to form the Kingdom of Italy in 1861; the Papal States and the city of Rome were annexed to the Kingdom in 1870, completing the Unification of Italy. This kingdom lasted until the aftermath of World War II, when the 1946 Italian institutional referendum ended the monarchy.

Image	Coat of Arms	Name	Life	Became King	Ceased to be King
		Victor Emmanuel II	14 March 1820 – 9 January 1878	17 March 1861	9 January 1878
		Umberto I	14 March 1844 – 29 July 1900	9 January 1878	29 July 1900
		Victor Emmanuel III	11 November 1869 – 28 December 1947	29 July 1900	9 May 1946
		Umberto II	15 September 1904 – 18 March 1983	9 May 1946	12 June 1946

=== Full title ===
Up until the dissolution of the monarchy in 1946, the full titles of the Kings of the Kingdom of Italy (1861–1946) were:

[Name], by the Grace of God and the will of the Nation, King of Italy, Emperor of Ethiopia, King of Sardinia, Cyprus, Jerusalem, Armenia, Albania, Duke of Savoy, count of Maurienne, Marquis (of the Holy Roman Empire) in Italy; Prince of Piedmont, Carignano, Oneglia, Poirino, Trino; Prince and Perpetual Vicar of the Holy Roman Empire; Prince of Carmagnola, Montmélian with Arbin and Francin, Prince bailiff of the Duchy of Aosta, Prince of Chieri, Dronero, Crescentino, Riva di Chieri and Banna, Busca, Bene, Bra, Duke of Genoa, Monferrat, Aosta, Duke of Chablais, Genevois, Duke of Piacenza, Marquis of Saluzzo (Saluces), Ivrea, Susa, of Maro, Oristano, Cesana, Savona, Tarantasia, Borgomanero and Cureggio, Caselle, Rivoli, Pianezza, Govone, Salussola, Racconigi over Tegerone, Migliabruna and Motturone, Cavallermaggiore, Marene, Modane and Lanslebourg, Livorno Ferraris, Santhià, Agliè, Centallo and Demonte, Desana, Ghemme, Vigone, Count of Barge, Villafranca, Ginevra, Nizza, Tenda, Romont, Asti, Alessandria, of Goceano, Novara, Tortona, Bobbio, Soissons, Sant'Antioco, Pollenzo, Roccabruna, Tricerro, Bairo, Ozegna, delle Apertole, Baron of Vaud and of Faucigni, Lord of Vercelli, Pinerolo, of Lomellina, of Valle Sesia, of the Marquisate of Ceva, Overlord of Monaco, Roccabruna and eleven-twelfths of Menton, Noble Patrician of Venice, Patrician of Ferrara.

== See also ==
- King of Jerusalem
- King of Lombardy-Venetia
- List of kings of the Lombards
- List of Neapolitan monarchs
- List of Sardinian monarchs
- List of Sicilian monarchs
- List of monarchs of the Kingdom of the Two Sicilies
- List of grand dukes of Tuscany
- List of monarchs of the Armenian Kingdom of Cilicia
- List of popes
- List of viceroys of Naples
- List of viceroys of Sicily
- List of Italian royal consorts

== Bibliography ==
- Sismondi, J.-C.-L. Simonde de (1906). History of the Italian Republics in the Middle Ages. London; New York: G. Routledge & Sons, Limited ; E.P. Dutton & Co. p. 29.
