= Santa Maria in Pertica, Pavia =

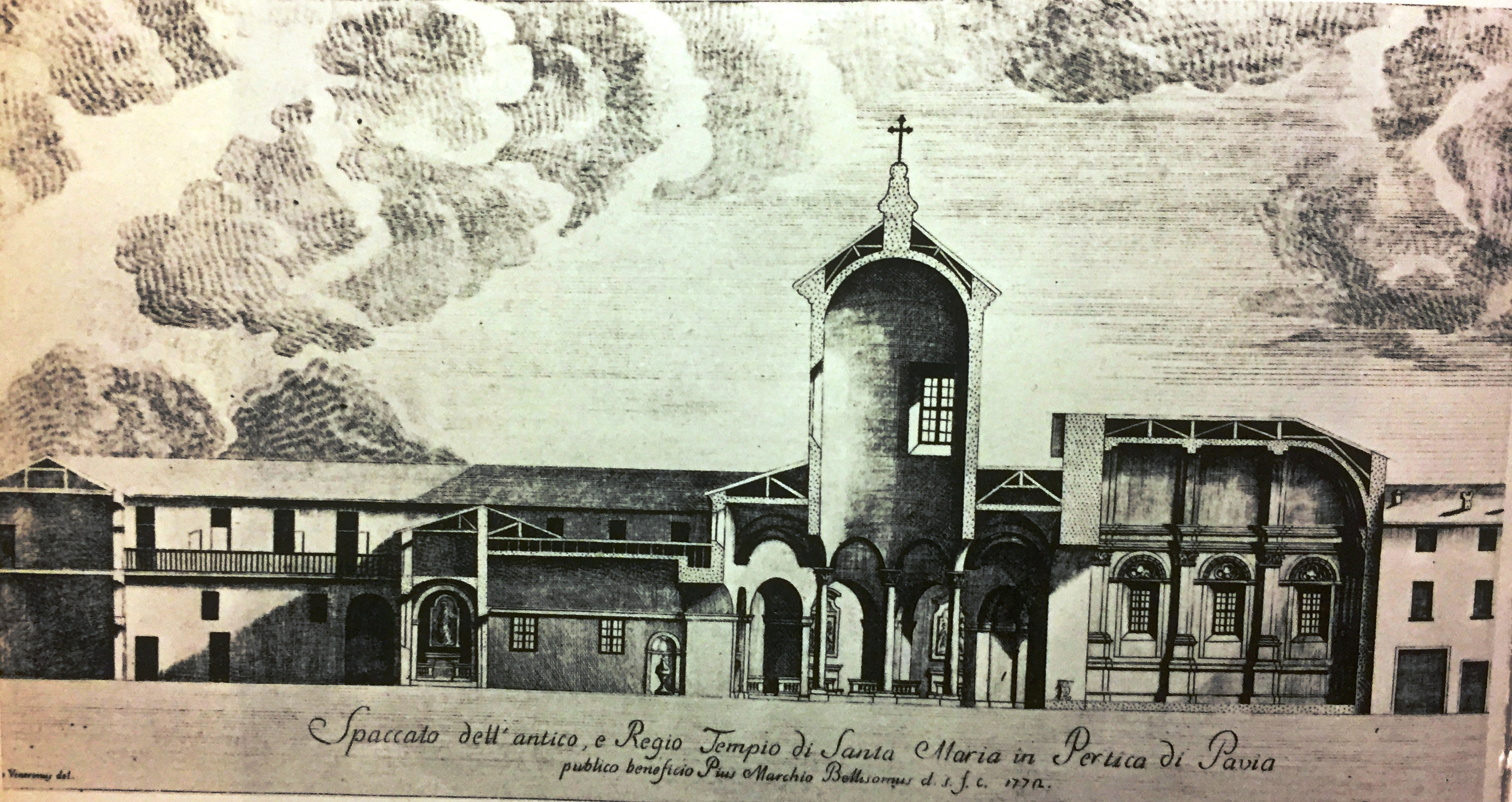
Historical drawing

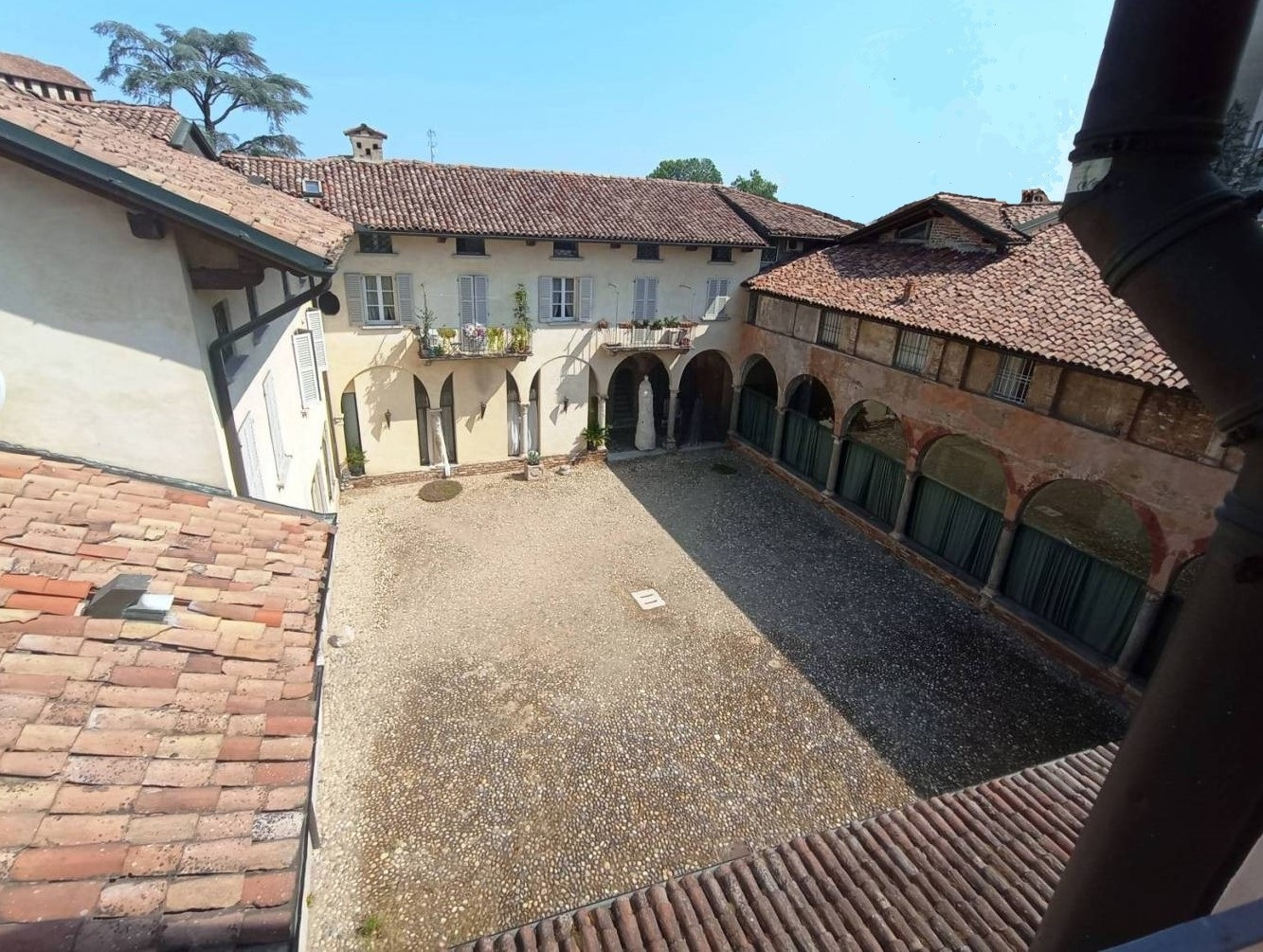
the cloister

Santa Maria in Pertica, also known as Santa Maria alle Pertiche, was a church once present in central Pavia, region of Lombardy, Italy.

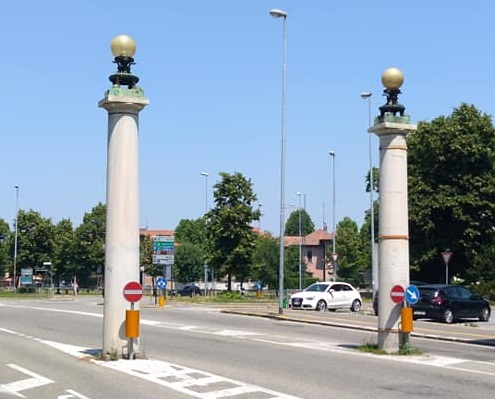
Two columns from the church now placed near Porta Milano of Pavia.

The early romanesque structure was founded in 677 by the Queen Rodelinda, wife of the king of the Lombards, Pectarit. It was destroyed in the 18th-century, and some of the columns of the former adjacent courtyard still remain. The circular church layout was influential in for some centuries after its foundation, serving as the coronation site of Hildeprand the Useless in 735. It is known now only from archeologic studies and engravings.
