= 595 =

Calendar year

595 in various calendars
- Gregorian calendar: 595; DXCV
- Ab urbe condita: 1348
- Armenian calendar: 44; ԹՎ ԽԴ
- Assyrian calendar: 5345
- Balinese saka calendar: 516–517
- Bengali calendar: 1–2
- Berber calendar: 1545
- Buddhist calendar: 1139
- Burmese calendar: −43
- Byzantine calendar: 6103–6104
- Chinese calendar: 甲寅年 (Wood Tiger); 3292 or 3085 — to — 乙卯年 (Wood Rabbit); 3293 or 3086
- Coptic calendar: 311–312
- Discordian calendar: 1761
- Ethiopian calendar: 587–588
- Hebrew calendar: 4355–4356
- Hindu calendars
- Vikram Samvat: 651–652
- Shaka Samvat: 516–517
- Kali Yuga: 3695–3696
- Holocene calendar: 10595
- Iranian calendar: 27 BP – 26 BP
- Islamic calendar: 28 BH – 27 BH
- Javanese calendar: 484–485
- Julian calendar: 595; DXCV
- Korean calendar: 2928
- Minguo calendar: 1317 before ROC 民前1317年
- Nanakshahi calendar: −873
- Seleucid era: 906/907 AG
- Thai solar calendar: 1137–1138
- Tibetan calendar: ཤིང་ཕོ་སྟག་ལོ་ (male Wood-Tiger); 721 or 340 or −432 — to — ཤིང་མོ་ཡོས་ལོ་ (female Wood-Hare); 722 or 341 or −431

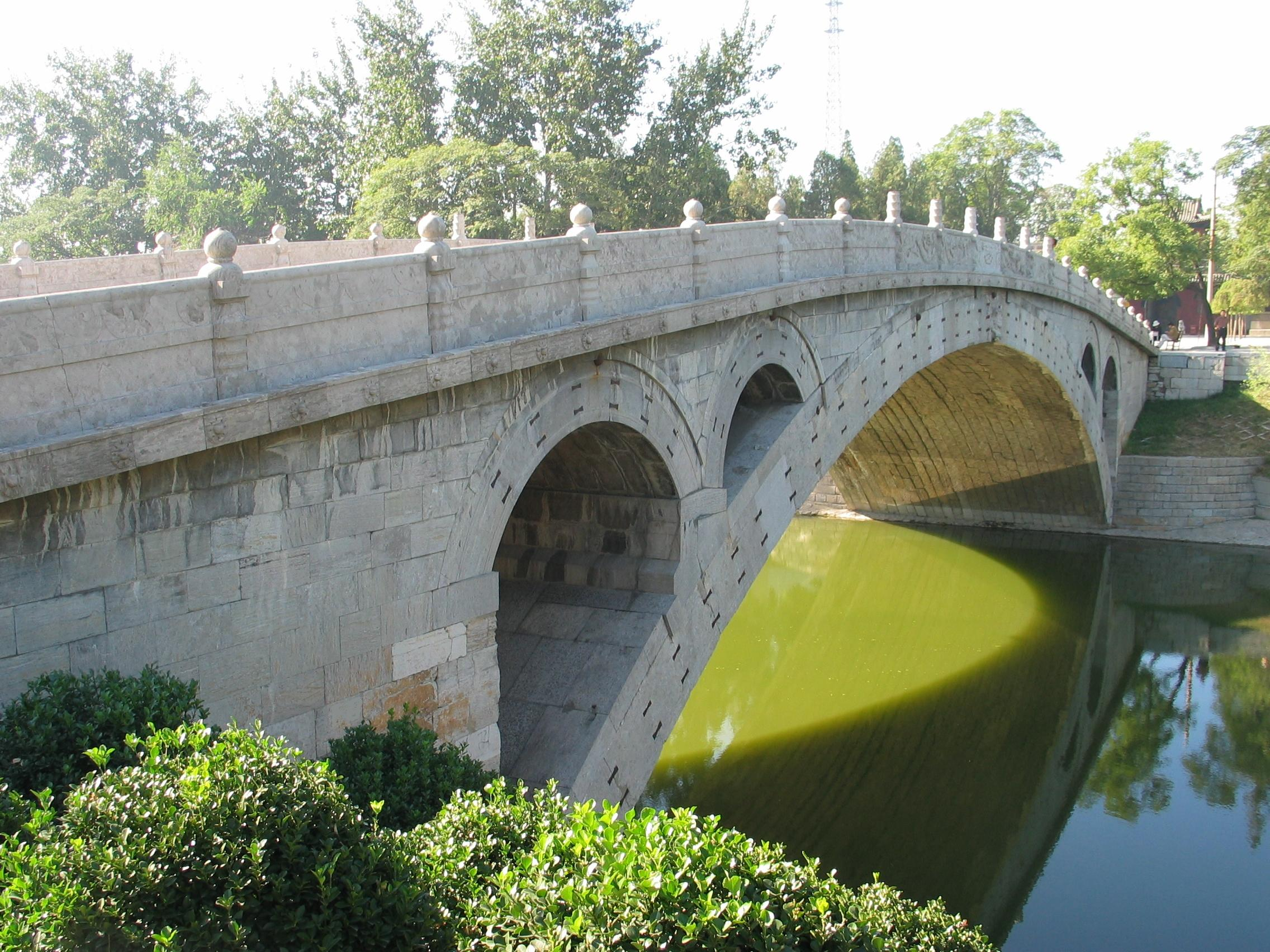
The Zhaozhou Bridge (Hebei Province, China)

Year 595 (DXCV) was a common year starting on Saturday of the Julian calendar. The denomination 595 for this year has been used since the early medieval period, when the Anno Domini calendar era became the prevalent method in Europe for naming years.

== Events ==
=== By place ===
==== Byzantine Empire ====
- Balkan Campaign: A Byzantine relief force under Priscus marches up the Danube River along the southern bank to Novae (modern Bulgaria). The fortress city of Singidunum (Belgrade) is plundered by the Avars, and abandoned after the approach of the Byzantines. The Avars retreat and launch a raid against Dalmatia.

==== Europe ====
- October – King Childebert II dies; his mother Brunhilda attempts to rule Austrasia and Burgundy, as regent for her grandsons. He is succeeded by his two young sons, Theudebert II and Theuderic II.
- The Lombards sack the town of Terracina (Central Italy). After they conquer more cities, Terracina remains an important military stronghold of the Byzantine Empire.
- After the death of Euin, Gaidoald becomes the Duke of Trent (Northern Italy).

==== Britain ====
- King Dynod Bwr of the Pennines (Northern England) dies fighting off a Bernician invasion. His kingdom Hen Ogledd ("The Old North") is overrun, and his family flees to Powys (approximate date).

==== Asia ====
- Spring – Emperor Wéndi orders the confiscation and destruction of privately held weapons; he exempts the border provinces from this edict.
- Supratisthitavarman succeeds his father Susthitavarman, as king of the Varman dynasty in Assam (Northeast India).
- Construction begins on the Zhaozhou Bridge ("Safe crossing bridge") in Hebei Province, during the Sui dynasty (China).

=== By topic ===
==== Religion ====
- June – Pope Gregory I the Great sends a group of Benedictine monks under Augustine of Canterbury on a mission to Britain, to Christianize King Æthelberht, and convert the Kingdom of Kent from native Anglo-Saxon paganism. He carries letters of commendation to bishops, and is accompanied by Frankish interpreters.
- September 2 – John IV ("the Faster"), patriarch of Constantinople, dies after a 13-year reign in which he has mediated disputes between the Eastern Orthodox Church and the Monophysites.
- Muhammad, Islamic prophet, meets and marries Khadija. She is a 40-year-old widow and 15 years older than he. Supported by Khadija's wealth, they form a successful merchant partnership.

== Births ==
- Asmā' bint Abu Bakr, female disciple (Sahaba) of Muhammad (d. 695)
- Cen Wenben, chancellor and editor of the Book of Zhou (d. 645)
- Kim Yu-shin, general of Silla (Korea) (d. 673)
- Sa`d ibn Abi Waqqas, companion of Muhammad (d. 674)
- Talhah, disciple and companion of Muhammad (approximate date)
- Zaynab bint Khuzayma, wife of Muhammad (d. 627)

== Deaths ==
- September 2 – John IV, patriarch of Constantinople
- Berach, Irish bishop and saint
- Childebert II, king of Austrasia (b. 570)
- Dynod Bwr, king of Hen Ogledd (approximate date)
- Euin, Lombard duke of Trent (Italy)
- Gartnait II, king of the Picts
- Owain mab Urien, king of Rheged (approximate date)
- Yuchi Chifan, empress of Northern Zhou (b. 566)
