= Bavarian dynasty =

Former ruling family of the Lombards

The Bavarian dynasty refers to those kings of the Lombards who were descended from Garibald I of Bavaria, a member of the Agilolfing dynasty and duke of Bavaria. They came to rule the Lombards through Garibald's daughter, Theodelinda, who married King Authari in 588. The Bavarians (Italian: Bavaresi) were effectively a branch of the Agilolfings, and can be divided into two lines: the female line, descended through Theodelinda, and the male line, through Garibald's son Gundoald.

Of the female line, only Adaloald—Theodelinda's son by her second husband, Agilulf—reigned. Her son-in-law Arioald, husband of her daughter Gundeberga, also became king.

From the male line of Gundoald, six kings reigned in succession, interrupted only by the usurper Grimoald, who solidified his claim by marrying Gundoald's granddaughter. The succession was as follows:

- Aripert I (653–661), son of Gundoald
- Godepert (661–662), eldest son of Aripert I, ruled jointly with:
- Perctarit (661–662; 672–688), younger son of Aripert I, deposed and later restored
- Cunipert (688–700), son of Perctarit
- Liutpert (700–701), son of Cunipert
- Raginpert (701), son of Godepert
- Aripert II (701–712), son of Raginpert

The Basilica of Santissimo Salvatore in Pavia, commissioned by Aripert I in 657, later became the mausoleum of the Bavarian dynasty.

== Sources ==
- Oman, Charles. The Dark Ages, 476–918. London: Rivingtons, 1914.
