= Aripert =

Aripert or Aribert may refer to:

- Aripert I, king of the Lombards from 653 to 661 AD
- Aripert II, king of the Lombards from 701 to 712 AD
