= Gausian dynasty =

Lombard ruling clan in the second half of the 6th century

The Gausian dynasty (or the Gausi), active roughly between 547 and 572, was a prominent Lombard ruling clan that led the migration into Italy under King Alboin. Founded by Audoin, the dynasty claimed elite lineage through marriage with Rodelinda (a Thuringian princess connected to the Ostrogothic royal family). They wrested power from the Lethings clan and subsequently led the Lombards into Italy.

== History ==
The Gausi were a prominent family when, in 539, the Lombards came under the rule of a minor sovereign, Walthari of the Lethings clan, and a member of the Gausi, Audoin, was elected his regent. In 547, Audoin succeeded Walthari, who had died young of natural causes, and assumed the royal mantle through usurpation. Alboin, Audoin's son and successor, defeated the Gepids with the help of the Avars and subsequently led the Lombard invasion of Italy in 568-569 AD. He conquered much of northern Italy, making the Lombard kings the rulers of the region. He conquered important cities, including Milan, although Pavia held out until 572. To strengthen his power, Alboin entered into several dynastic marriages: first with Chlothsind of the Merovingian dynasty, and later with the Gepid Rosamund. Alboin died without male heirs in 572 or 573 and was succeeded by Cleph, of the lineage of Beleos. However, he was assassinated in 572, after a reign that marked the beginning of centuries of Lombard rule.

The noble house of the Gausi continued with the first duke of Friuli, Gisulf I of Friuli, nephew of Alboin and grandson of Audoin. His heirs would eventually seize power in the Duchy of Benevento, leading to the rise of another King of Italy from the Gausi lineage: Grimoald of Benevento. The descendants of Gisulf I ruled the Duchy of Friuli until approximately 653, the Duchy of Benevento from 646 to 806, and, from 662 to 671, two members of this family, Grimoald and Garibald, occupied the throne of the Lombard Kingdom. The last male representative of this branch of the Gausi family was Grimoald III, who died in 806.

== Religion ==
Originally pagans, around the mid-6th century the Gausi, like other Lombards, had adopted Christianity in its Arian form. They adhered to this religion at least until the second half of the 7th century. However, since the time of Duke Romuald I of Benevento, members of the Gausi family are mentioned in sources only as supporters of Roman Catholic Church.

== Sources ==
- Jarnut, Jörg (1995) [1982]. Storia dei Longobardi (in Italian). Translated by Guglielmotti, Paola. Torino: Einaudi. ISBN 88-06-13658-5.
- Rovagnati, Sergio (2003). I Longobardi (in Italian). Milano: Xenia. ISBN 88-7273-484-3.
- Tyrrell, V. Alice (2012). Merovingian Letters and Letter Writers (PDF) (PhD diss.). University of Toronto.
