= Battle of Coronate =

689 battle in Lombardy, Italy

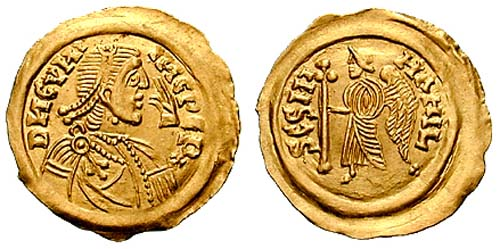
- Lombard Tremissis: DN CVNI-INCPE RX / SCS MI-HAHIL; King Cunincpert of the Lombards and Saint Michael the Archangel who appeared before the battle
Date	689
Location	Cornate d'Adda, Lombardy
Result	Victory for King Cunincpert

Belligerents
Lombard Neustria; Loyal to King Cunincpert	Lombard Austria; Loyal to Duke Alahis

Commanders and leaders
King Cunincpert	Duke Alahis of Trent †

Casualties and losses
Heavy	Heavy (poss. entire army)

The Battle of Coronate was fought in 689 between rival Lombard forces loyal to King Cunicpert and Alahis, Usurper King and Duke of Trent. Victory went to Cunicpert and Alahis was killed.

== Initial campaign ==
In 689 Cunicpert returned from exile and ousted Alahis from the capital Pavia. Alahis fled towards the east, into Austria. There he assembled an army to march against the king. Within the same year, Alahis crossed the River Adda, the border between Neustria and Austria, and faced Cunincpert in the plain of Coronate.

== Battle ==
Wishing to spare the Lombard blood of so many, Cunincpert offered Alahis to engage him in single combat. But Alahis refused and both camps prepared for battle. Fearing for Cunincpert's life, a deacon named Seno begged the king to lend him his armor, so that he, the deacon, appeared to be the king and distract all troubles from Cunincpert. Finally, Cunincpert agreed to that plan and battle was joined.

Once Alahis spotted the supposed king, he charged and killed him. When Alahis was about to take off the helmet, and present to his troops the dead king, he realised that he had only slain a cleric. In fury, Alahis swore a horrible oath, as Paul the Deacon recorded:

Woe is me! We have done nothing when we have brought the battle to this point that we have killed a churchman! Therefore, I now make this kind of a vow that if God shall give me the victory I will fill a whole well with the members of churchmen.

Cunincpert's men were horrified by the news that the king had been killed. But Cunincpert assured them all that he was alive and well. Again the two hosts drew together for the battle, and again Cunincpert renewed his offer to settle the quarrel by single combat and spare the lives of the people. But Alahis again refused to accept the challenge, this time alleging that he saw among the standards of his rival the image of the Archangel Michael.

The trumpets sounded again for the charge, neither side gave way to the other, and a terrible slaughter was made of Lombard warriors. But at length Alahis fell, and the victory went to King Cunincpert. Great was the slaughter among the fleeing troops of Alahis, and those who were not killed by the sword, drowned in the River Adda.

== Aftermath ==
The head and legs of Alahis were cut off, leaving only his torso. The body of the brave deacon Seno, however, was buried by the king’s order before the gates of the church of St. John. Cunincpert returned to Pavia in great triumph and later founded a monastery in honor of St. George the Martyr on the battlefield of Coronate in memory of his victory.
