= Liutbert =

Liutbert may refer to:

- Liutpert, king of the Lombards (died 702)
- Liutbert (archbishop of Cologne) (died 871), also Prince-Bishop of Münster
- Liutbert (archbishop of Mainz) (died 889)
