= Gaidoald =

Lombard duke of Trent

Gaidoald (Latin: Gaidoaldus, Gaidualdus or Gadoaldus) was the second Lombard duke of Trent, succeeding Euin in 595.

Our main source for Gaidoald's life is Paul the Deacon's Historia Langobardorum, which in turn depends on the lost Historiola of Secundus of Non, Gaidoald's contemporary. Nothing is known of Gaidoald before his accession to the duchy, although he was probably already a powerful and influential man. No sources speak of his family relations, and all speculation is based on onomastics. The -oald element in his name (from Proto-Germanic *waldaną, to rule) was especially common among the Agilolfing family of neighbouring Bavaria, who were of Frankish origin.

Paul describes as "a good man and a Catholic in religion" (Historia Langobardorum IV.10). This meant that he was neither a pagan nor an Arian. In the schism of the Three Chapters then affecting northern Italy, he probably adhered to the Three Chapters, as did Secundus of Non and Bishop Agnellus of Trent.

The duchy of Trent was strategically important, since it lay on the main road to Austrasia and Bavaria. According to Paul the Deacon, Gaidoald was assigned to Trent by King Agilulf, who was Euin's brother-in-law, their wives being sisters. The women were Agilofings and their brother, Gundoald, was rewarded with the duchy of Asti when he fled Bavaria in 589. These known connections strengthen the supposition that Gaidoald was an Agilolfing related by marriage to the king.

Despite his obvious closeness to the royal family, Gaidoald later joined a rebellion, the precise dating of which is uncertain, but certainly after 600. For reasons unknown, Gaidoald and Duke Gisulf II of Friuli broke with Agilulf—"refused contact" in Paul's words. They were probably acting in concert with the Byzantine exarch Kallinikos, who launched an attack on Agilulf in 601. The king's daughter and son-in-law, Godescalc, duke of Parma, were captured and Kallinikos achieved several military victories over Agilulf's forces. Not long after, Gaidoald and Gisulf made peace with the king. In celebration of the peace, Agilulf had his son Adaloald baptised at Monza on 7 April 603 with Secundus acting as godfather.

While nothing is known of Gaidoald after his reconciliation with Agilulf, it is probable that he lived beyond 612, since in that year Secundus died and his Historiola came to an end. In that event, the date of his death would likely not have been known to Paul. No dukes of Trent are known after Gaidoald until Alahis in the 680s.
