= Liber Papiensis =

The Liber Papiensis (Latin for "Pavian Book"), also called the Liber Legis Langobardorum ("Book of the Law of the Lombards"), is a collection of legal texts compiled in the first half of the 11th century in Pavia, then the capital of the kingdom of Italy. The Liber includes all the edicts issued by the Lombard kings between 643 and 755 in chronological order, the laws issued by the Carolingians between 774 and 887 (collectively called the Capitulare Italicum), and the edicts of the Ottonian and Salian emperors thereafter.

The Liber Papiensis survives in several manuscripts, no two of which contain exactly the same set of laws. The earliest manuscript, written down between 1028 and 1039, contains only Carolingian laws relevant to Italy.

== Sources ==
- Ascheri, Mario (2013). The Laws of Late Medieval Italy (1000–1500): Foundations for a European Legal System. Brill.
- Radding, Charles M. (2003). "Legal Theory and Practice in Eleventh-Century Italy". Law and History Review. 21 (2): 377–81. doi:10.2307/3595097. JSTOR 3595097. S2CID 145500113.
- Radding, Charles M.; Ciaralli, Antonio (2007). The Corpus Iuris Civilis in the Middle Ages: Manuscripts and Transmission from the Sixth Century to the Juristic Revival. Brill.
- Witt, Ronald G. (2012). The Two Latin Cultures and the Foundation of Renaissance Humanism in Medieval Italy. Cambridge University Press.
