= Rodelinda =

Rodelinda may refer to:

- Rodelinda (opera), an opera seria by George Frideric Handel
- Rodelinda (6th century), wife of King Audoin of Lombardy and mother of King Alboin
- Rodelinda (7th century), wife of King Perctarit of Lombardy and title character of the opera
