= Grimoald, King of the Lombards =

King of the Lombards from 662 to 671

Grimoald
- Reign: Duke of Benevento; King of the Lombards; King of Italy
- Predecessor: Godepert and Perctarit
- Successor: Garibald
- Born: c. 610; Friuli, Italy
- Died: 671; Italy
- Burial: Pavia
- Spouse: a daughter of Aripert I
- Issue: Garibald; Romuald I of Benevento
- House: Gausian Dynasty
- Father: Duke Gisulf II of Friuli
- Mother: Bavarian Princess Ramhilde, daughter of Duke Garibald I of Bavaria.
- Religion: Arianism

Grimoald or Grimwald (died 671) was the Duke of Benevento (as Grimoald I) from 647 to 662 and the King of the Lombards from 662 until his death.

== Life ==
Grimoald was born as the youngest son of Duke Gisulf II of Friuli and the Bavarian Princess Ramhilde, daughter of Duke Garibald I of Bavaria. When the Avars invaded Italy in 611, Gisulf's army was outnumbered and the duchy overrun. Gisulf died in battle; Grimoald and his brother Radoald escaped to Beneventum, where they were adopted by Duke Arechis, a distant kinsman.

From 641 to 642, he and his brother served as regents to Arechis's son and successor Duke Aiulf I. Aiulf was killed in 642, defending against some Slavic invaders; he was succeeded by Radoald. In 647, Grimoald succeeded Radoald as Duke of Benevento. As duke, he successfully defended the Sanctuary of Monte Sant'Angelo on Mount Gargano from "Greeks", possibly from Naples, who had come to plunder.

== Reign ==
In 661 Aripert I, King of the Lombards, was succeeded by his sons Perctarit, who governed from Milan, and Godepert from Pavia. In 662 the brothers fell out, and Godepert sent Garipald, Duke of Turin to persuade Grimoald to assist in a war against Perctarit. With the connivance of Garibald, Grimoald assassinated Godepert and forced Perctarit to flee. Garipald was subsequently killed by one of Godepert's retainers.

Grimoald sent Perctarit's wife and son to Benevento and took over as King of the Lombards. He promptly married Godepert's sister Theodota, in order to associate himself with the Bavarian dynasty of Theodelinda. Grimoald passed on the title of Duke of Benevento to his eldest son Romuald.

His skill in battle secured victories in many border wars. He personally led his armies to victory against the Byzantines (under Emperor Constans II) at the siege of Benevento. Romuald took Taranto and Brindisi, thus reducing the Byzantine influence in the region during Mezezius' rebellion in Sicily. Grimoald took Forlì in the north from the Greeks and razed Oderzo where his brothers Tasso and Kakko had been murdered years before. His capture of Forlì on Easter Day was polarizing between Orthodox Christians and Pagan Longobard traditionalists, as many Christians were slaughtered during festivities.

While battling the Byzantines in Southern Italy, he appointed Duke Lupus of Friuli as Regent in the North. Soon after, Lupus usurped all authority and rebelled; Lupus's forces were promptly defeated, he was killed, and his duchy destroyed with the help of the Avars. Grimoald tracked down Lupus' aspiring son Arnefrit and his Slavic allies, defeating them at Nimis. Arnefrit was killed in battle. Grimoald placed Wechthari, a stalwart enemy of the Slavs, in Friuli.

Grimoald defeated the Franks, who invaded during the infancy of Chlothar III. He saved the northeast of Italy by defeating the Slav tribes and maintained internal order by suppressing the baronial revolts and autonomy of the duchies of Friuli and of Spoleto, where he installed Thrasimund.

In his religion, he remained nominally Arian (though according to Vita Sancti Barbati both he and his son Romuald still practiced the ancient Pagan rites of both Benevento and the Longobard nation) despite his marriage to a Catholic. He distanced himself from the papacy. However, he perceived Saint Michael—whose cult was spreading strongly from Monte Gargano—as the warrior-protector of the Lombard nation, replacing Wodan (Odin) due to their similar narratives at the time. He had San Michele Maggiore built over the site of the Lombard Palace chapel in Pavia.

He died in 671 after concluding a treaty with the Franks. Grimoald was buried in the Basilica of St. Ambrose in Pavia

His son Garibald was elected to succeed him and was then deposed by the once exiled Perctarit in three months time. Grimoald was popular for his generosity and mercy, as well as his ruthlessness in war. His son Romuald was left in Benevento, which once again drifted away from the central authority.

Regnal titles
Preceded by Radoald	Duke of Benevento; 647–662	Succeeded by Romoald I
Preceded by Godepert	King of the Lombards; 662–671	Succeeded by Garibald
Preceded by Perctarit	King of the Lombards; 662–671	Succeeded by Garibald
Preceded by Perctarit	King of Italy; 662–671	Succeeded by Garibald
