= Grimoald II =

Grimoald II may refer to:

- Grimoald II of Benevento (died 689), duke
- Grimoald the Younger (died 714), mayor of the palace of Neustria
