= Basilica of Santissimo Salvatore =

Church in Pavia, Italy

Coordinates: 45°11′16.34″N 9°8′20.32″E

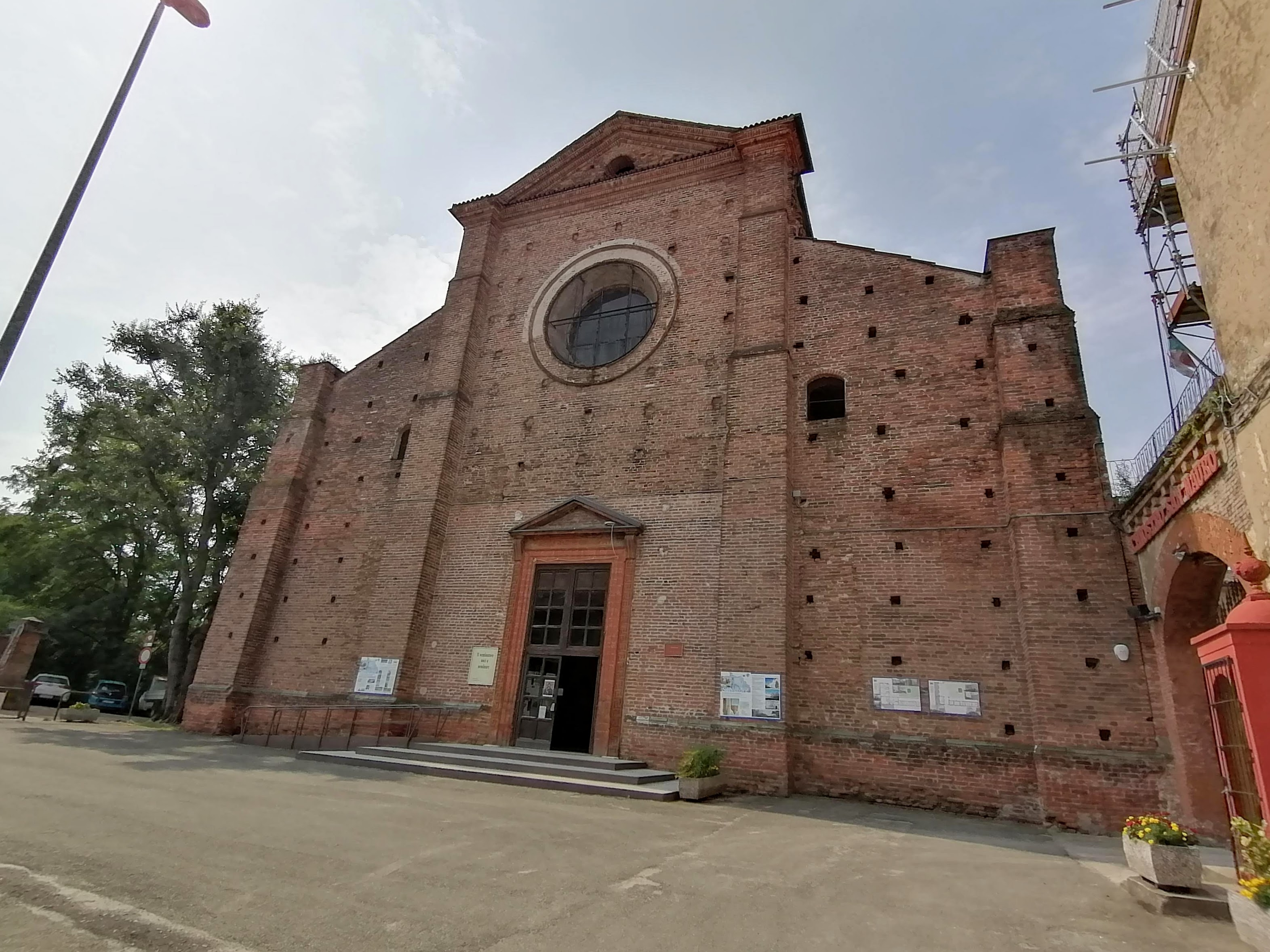

Religion
- Affiliation: Catholic
- Province: Pavia
- Year consecrated: 657
- Status: Active

Location
- Location: Pavia, Italy
- Interactive map of Basilica of Santissimo Salvatore

Architecture
- Type: Church
- Style: Renaissance
- Completed: 1511

The Basilica of Santissimo Salvatore is a Roman Catholic church in Pavia, region of Lombardy, Italy. It was founded in 657 by the Lombard king Aripert I and became a mausoleum for many of the Lombard kings.

== History ==
The first documentation relating to the church is by the historian Paul the Deacon, who refers to the foundation of a "church of the Savior" by Aripert I, king of the Lombards from 653 to 661, to build a place for his burial, as well as his sons Perctarit and Godepert and his nephews Cunipert, Liutpert (certainly not) and Aripert II, thus creating a Bavarian dynasty mausoleum, as well as to celebrate the definitive conversion of the Lombards to Catholicism.

The original nucleus of the church is dated to 657. The medieval church of Saint Salvatore was a church-mausoleum of illustrious Lombard kings. Aripert I with his son Perctarit, nephew Cunipert, Liutpert and Aripert II were buried there.

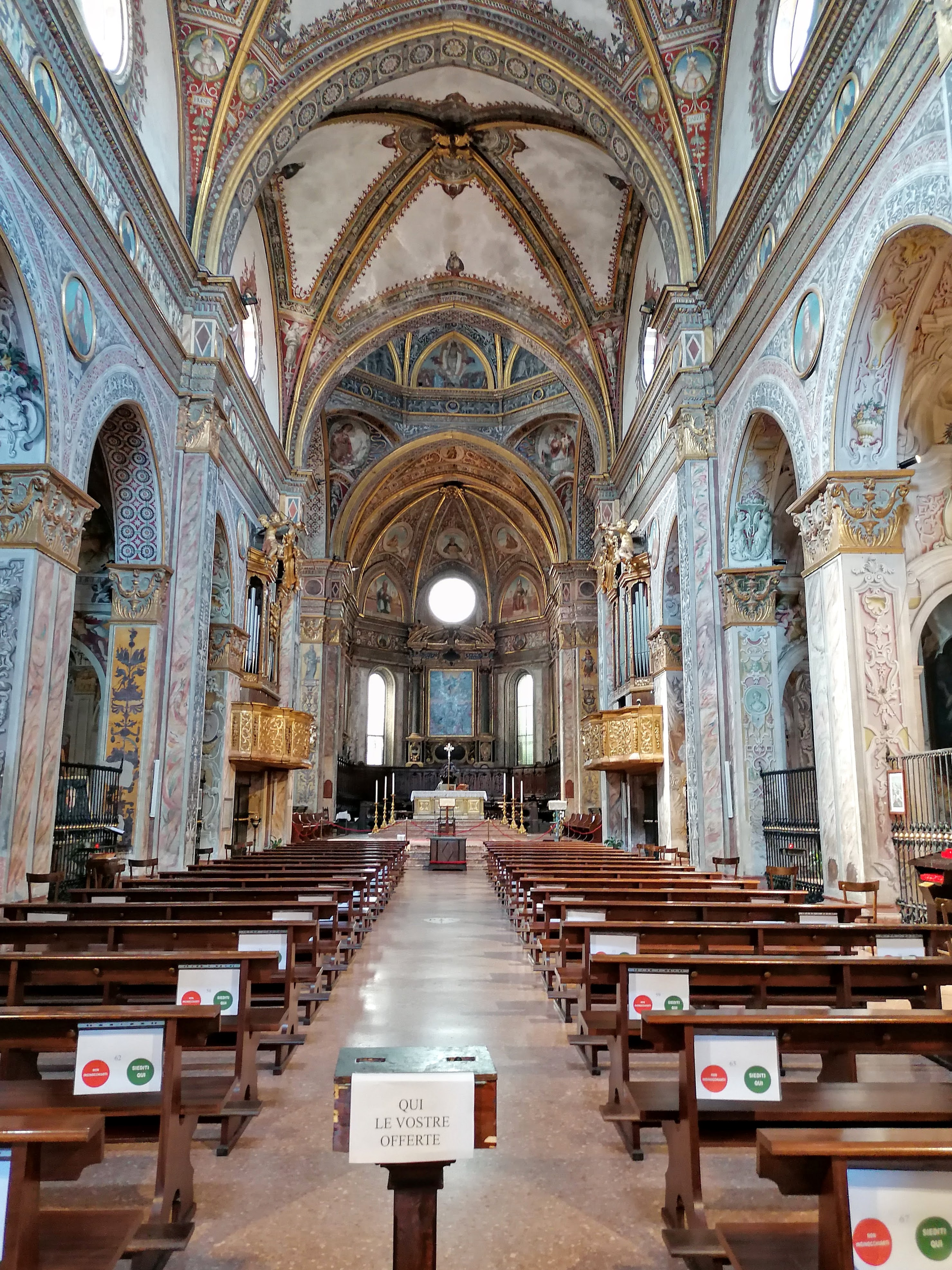
Interior

Adelaide of Italy, queen consort of Italy (from 947 to 950, as wife of Lothair II of Italy, and subsequently from 962 to 973, as wife of Otto I) decided to rebuild both the church and the monastery from the foundations. In 971, he entrusted the monastery to the Benedictine Order and the religious organization to Majolus of Cluny. With the diploma of September 30, 982, Emperor Otto II, donated to the monastery the villages and lands of Corteolona and Monticelli Pavese, and in Garlasco. In the 12th and 13th centuries, the monastery was the owner of land near Monticelli Pavese, over which the monastery held feudal and ban rights. Frederick Barbarossa is hosted in the palatium near the monastery, later crowned king in the basilica of San Michele Maggiore. In 1248, the Emperor Frederick II also stayed in the same palatium.

In 1448, the monastery was joined to the Benedictines of the Congregation of the Fathers of Santa Giustina of Padua. The Benedictines had both the church and the monastery rebuilt between 1453 and 1511. The church was rebuilt in late Gothic or Renaissance forms (perhaps under architect Giovanni Antonio Amadeo). The importance of the Pavia monastery was certainly maintained until the mid-sixteenth century, as evidenced by the privilege of confirmation of property and immunity issued by Charles V in 1540, followed by a similar one of Philip II in 1555. Important was 1585, the year in where an official ceremony was held for the deposition of the bones of the kings, already buried in the ancient church, in the new building.

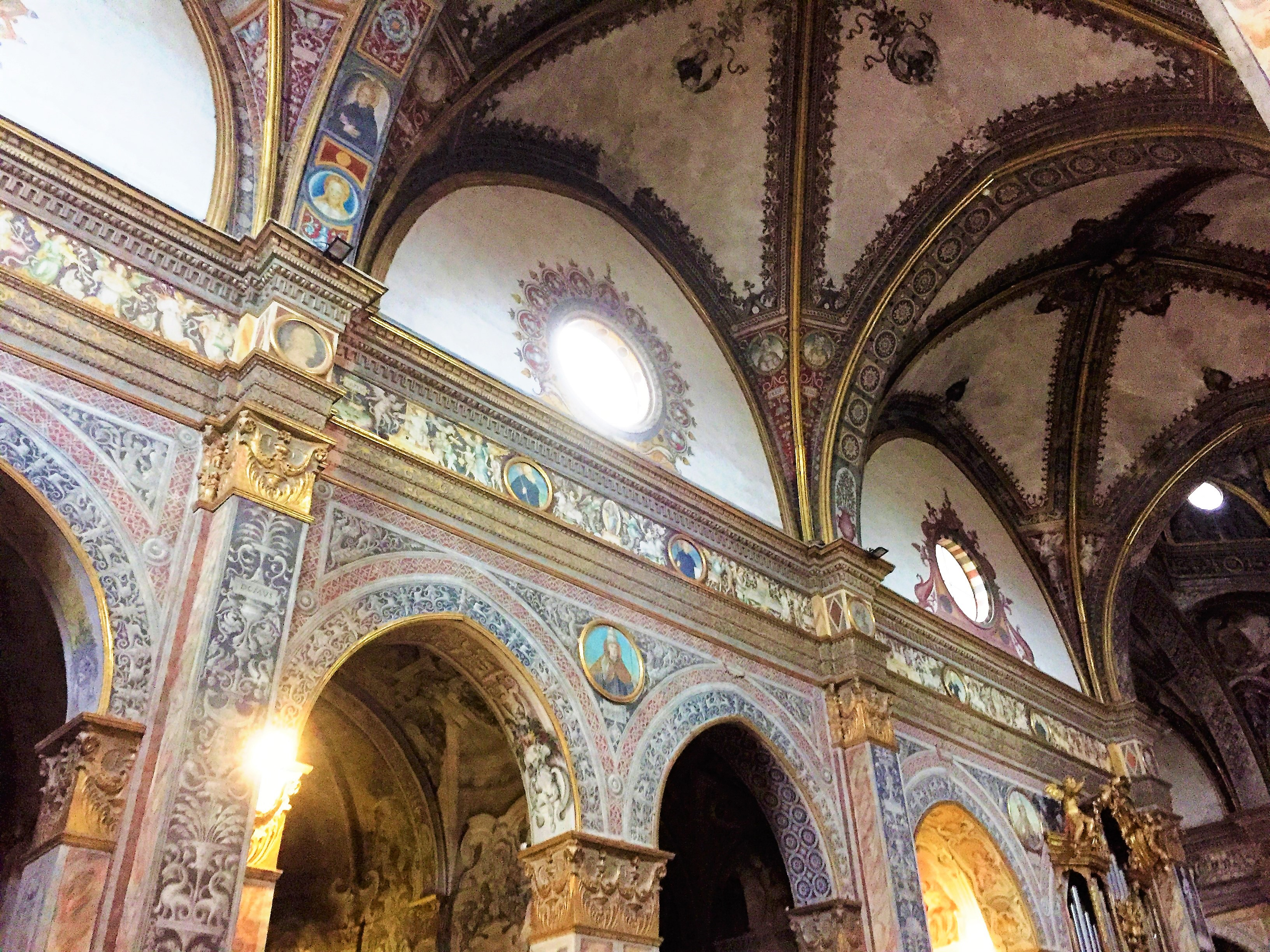
Interior

Between 1777 and 1779, the Austrian government promoted the establishment, inside the monastery, of the Typography of the Royal Imperial Monastery of San Salvatore, entrusted to the monks but financed by the government and equipped with then modern printing equipment. In 1782, the monastery was suppressed together with other religious corporations in Pavia. In 1795, the monastery was granted to the municipality to house a college for students. Between 1859 and 1900, the church was used by the army as an infirmary and only in 1901 was it returned to the Catholic church. Since 2017, archaeological investigations have started inside the basilica and the former monastery. The excavations have not yet been completed, but have unearthed Lombard tombs that may contain the bones of kings.

== Architecture ==
The church has a Latin cross plan with three apses, with Gothic rib vaults. The three naves inside the church have classical decorations dating back to the beginning of the 16th century; grotesque motifs, friezes with angels and tondi and portraits of monks in the entablature, clipei with prophets in the apse segments and church doctors in the lunettes. The frescoes and the interior spaces constitute Renaissance elements in a monument that remains marked by the late Gothic taste.

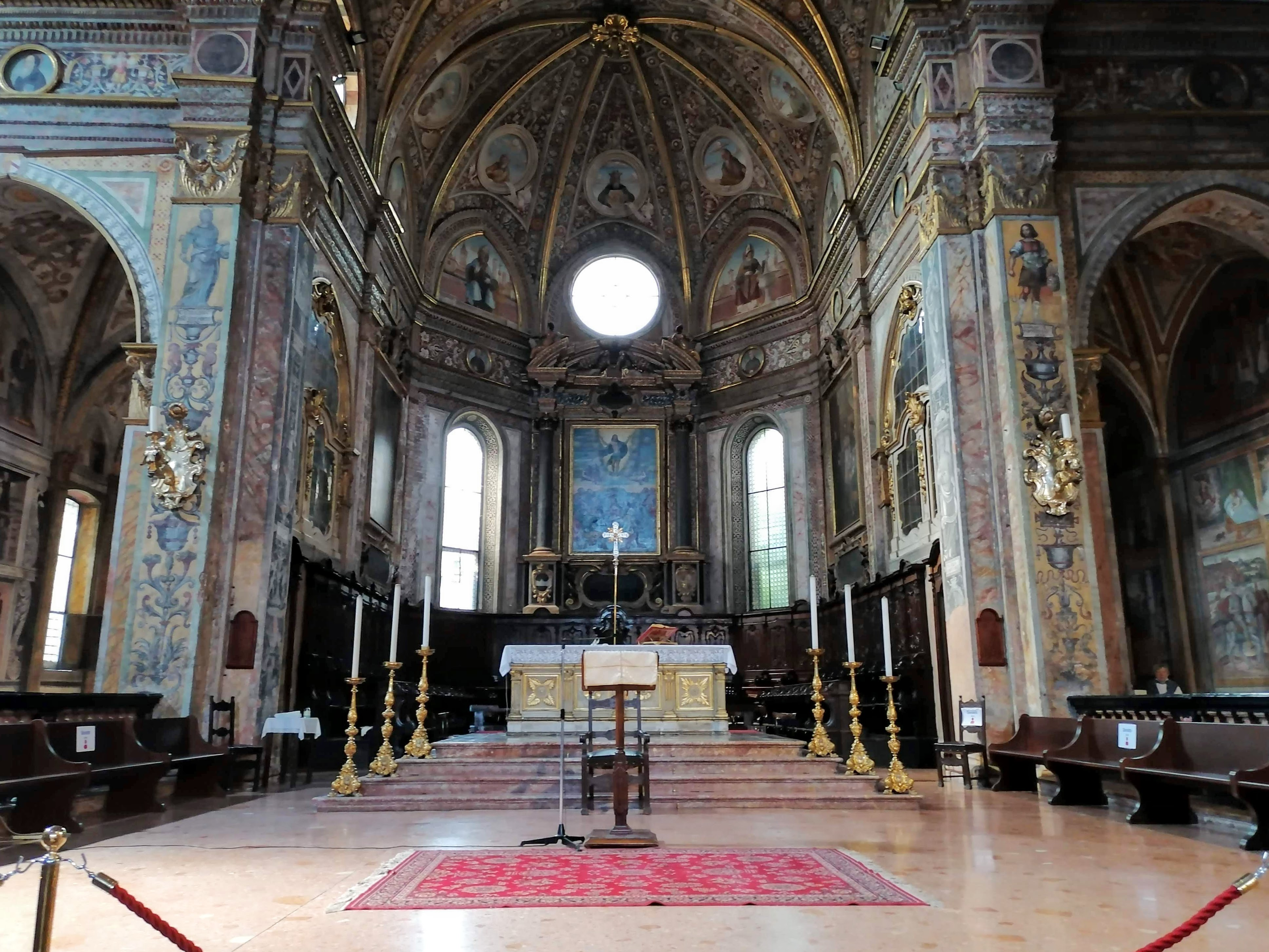
High altar

In the first chapel on the left it is possible to admire the youthful frescoes by the painter Bernardino Lanzani. The frescoes narrate episodes from the life of Saint Majolus of Cluny. The fourth chapel on the left is dedicated to the life of Saint Anthony the Great. The frescoes are from Lanzani's workshop and describe episodes from the contemplative life of Saint Anthony. At the back of the church, on the right side of the main altar, the chapel dedicated to San Martin of Tours is preserved. It is a chapel with large volumes typical of the Gothic, with beautiful frescoes also by Bernardo Lanzani. On the dome, which is divided into eight segments, the celestial vault is painted, small clouds and heads of cherubs with purple wings forming concentric circles. The keystone is dominated by the great dove of the Holy Spirit, which hovers in the sky with outstretched wings, emphasized by the rays of golden light. The presbytery contains a rich frescoed decoration dating back to the early 1500s, again by Bernardino Lanzani.

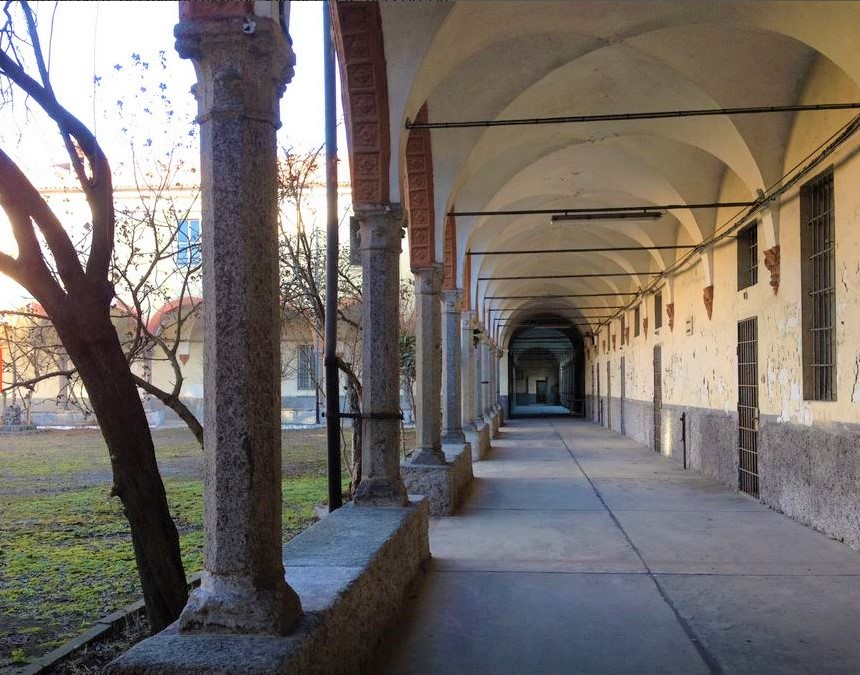
cloister

The cloisters was built between 1460 and 1470 and returned to the parish by the military in 1992, it has a square plan and is surrounded on four sides by a portico, supported by columns. with an octagonal section in granite, equipped with Gothic-style capitals, contrasted with capitals in terracotta. Although they are still covered with several layers of paint remains of 15th century frescoes emerge.

== Bibliography ==
- Musei Civici di Pavia. Pavia longobarda e capitale di regno. Secoli VI- X, a cura di S. Lomartire, D. Tolomelli, Skira, Milano, 2017.
- Piero Majocchi, Pavia città regia. Storia e memoria di una capitale altomedievale, Roma, Viella, 2008.
- Aldo A. Settia, Pavia carolingia e postcarolingia, in Storia di Pavia, II, L'alto medioevo, Milano, Banca del Monte di Lombardia, 1987.
- Stefano Gasparri, Pavia longobarda, in Storia di Pavia, II, L'alto medioevo, Milano, Banca del Monte di Lombardia, 1987.
