= King of Lombardy =

The title King of Lombardy could refer to:

- The Lombard kings
- The rulers of the medieval Kingdom of Italy
- The rulers of the Kingdom of Lombardy–Venetia
