= Teudelinda (8th-century) =

Teudelinda (7th-century – fl. 702) was a Duchess consort of Asti by marriage to King Ansprand.

She, along with her son and daughter, was captured by Aripert II after the defeat of her spouse. As a punishment for her ambition to become queen, she had her nose and ears mutilated. It is not known if she was still alive when her spouse became king in 712, so it remains unclear whether she ever became queen.
