= Gisulf I =

Gisulf I may refer to:

- Gisulf I of Friuli (reigned c. 569 – c. 590)
- Gisulf I of Benevento (died 706)
- Gisulf I of Salerno (930–977)
