= Gisulf I of Benevento =

Italian noble

Gisulf I (died 706) was the duke of Benevento from 689, when his brother Grimoald II died. His father was Romuald I. His mother was Theodrada (or Theuderata), daughter of Duke Lupus of Friuli, and she exercised the regency for him for the first years of his reign.

According to Paul the Deacon, it was during his reign that the relics of Saint Benedict of Nursia and Saint Scholastica his sister were taken from Monte Cassino by the Franks. Gisulf may have granted the monastery of San Vincenzo al Volturno a bloc of land 500 km^{2} (190 sq mi) in size around 700.

In about 705, Gisulf took the cities of Sora, Arpino, and Arce. He marched as far as Horrea, plundering and burning, before he was confronted with gifts by the ambassadors of Pope John VI, who ransomed many of his captives and induced him to return whence he had come to his own dominions.

He was an energetic duke, like his father and grandfather. He fought against king, pope, and Byzantine. He was married to Winiperga and was succeeded by his son Romuald II.

== Sources ==
- Lexikon des Mittelalters: Gisulf I. Herzog von Benevent (681-698).
- Paul the Deacon. Historia Langobardorum. Available at Northvegr.
- Chris Wickham. Early Medieval Italy: Central Power and Local Society, 400–1000. London: Macmillan, 1981.

== Notes ==
Regnal titles
Preceded by Grimoald II	Duke of Benevento; 689–706	Succeeded by Romoald II
