= Romuald I of Benevento =

Italian duke

Romuald I (also spelled Romoald and in Italian Romualdo), duke of Benevento (662–687) was the son of Grimoald, king of the Lombards. When his father usurped the throne in 662, he left Benevento under Romuald and sent the deposed king Perctarit's wife, Rodelinde, and son, Cunincpert, into exile at the Romuald's court in Benevento.

Romuald betrothed his sister Gisa to Roman Emperor Constans II. The Byzantines were then besieging Benevento and Romuald's valiant defence of the city was failing, when Grimoald showed up and routed the Roman menace. Romuald then took Taranto and Brindisi, much limiting the Imperial influence in the region. He received military aid from the possibly Bulgar or Avar Alzeco horde, which had recently entered Italy due to power struggles in Pannonia. In return, he gave them grazing rights and Alzeco the title of gastald in 667.

Romuald never saw the kingdom his father had won and so well defended; Perctarit returned and ceased the kingship. He was succeeded at Benevento by his son by Theodrada, daughter of Duke Lupus of Friuli, Grimoald II.

== Bibliography ==
- Hartmann, L.M. (1926). "Italy under the Lombards". In Gwatkin, H.M.; Whitney, J. P. (eds.). The Cambridge Medieval History:. Vol. II—The Rise of the Saracens and the Foundations of the Western Empire. Cambridge University Press. p. 194-221.
- Wickham, Chris (1981). Early Medieval Italy: Central Power and Local Society, 400–1000. Macmillan. ISBN 0-472-08099-7.

Regnal titles
Preceded by Grimoald I	Duke of Benevento; 662–687	Succeeded by Grimoald II
