= Pope John VI =

Head of the Catholic Church from 701 to 705

- Bishop of Rome
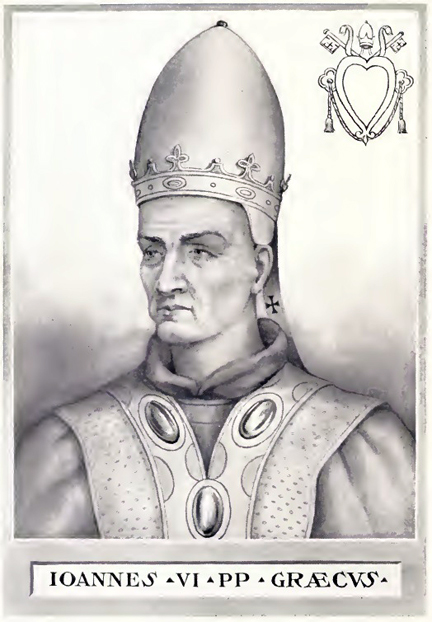
- Church: Catholic Church
- Papacy began: 30 October 701
- Papacy ended: 11 January 705
- Predecessor: Sergius I
- Successor: John VII

Personal details
- Born: 655 Ephesus, Thracesian Theme, Eastern Roman Empire
- Died: 11 January 705 (aged 49–50) Rome, Italy, Eastern Roman Empire

Pope John VI (Latin: Ioannes VI; 655 – 11 January 705) was the bishop of Rome from 30 October 701 to his death on 11 January 705. John VI was a Greek from Ephesus who reigned during the Byzantine Papacy. His papacy was noted for military and political breakthroughs on the Italian Peninsula. He was succeeded by Pope John VII after a vacancy of less than two months. The body of the pope was buried in Old St. Peter's Basilica.

== Greek papacy ==
A Greek from Ephesus, John VI succeeded Sergius I. His selection occurred after a vacancy of less than seven weeks.

John assisted Exarch Theophylactos, who had been sent to Italy by Emperor Tiberius III, and prevented him from using violence against the Romans. John VI's interventions prevented Theophylactos from being injured, having come to Rome to "cause trouble for the pontiff".

In 704, after being expelled, yet again, from his see, the elderly Bishop Wilfrid of York went to Rome and pleaded his case "before the apostolic Pope John [VI]". Wilfrid had visited Rome in 654 and 679 and witnessed the progressive transformation of the Church administration to a Greek-dominated hierarchy. Because of this, John VI convened a synod of Greek-speaking bishops to hear Wilfrid's cause, a linguistic hurdle that much perturbed Wilfrid. Nonetheless, the synod exonerated Wilfrid, restored him to his see, which he occupied until his death in 709, and sent him back with letters for King Æthelred of Mercia for papal mandates to be implemented. John also sent the pallium to Berhtwald, whom Sergius I had confirmed as archbishop of Canterbury.

== Relations with Lombards ==
John succeeded in inducing Duke Gisulf I of Benevento to withdraw from the territories of the empire through tactics of persuasion and bribery. According to some sources, he "single-handedly convinced the Lombard duke Gisulf of Benevento to withdraw his forces and return home" after the duke had devastated the neighboring Campanian countryside and constructed an encampment within sight of the city walls of Rome. Distressed at the sufferings of the people, Pope John sent a number of priests furnished with money into the camp of the Lombard duke to ransom all the captives whom Gisulf had taken.

Other significant events during John VI's pontificate include the Lombard king Aripert II returning the Cottian Alps to their former status as a papal patrimony. Numerous construction projects also occurred, including a new ambon in the Basilica of St. Andrew the Apostle, a new altar cloth for San Marco, and "suspended diaphonous white veils between the columns on either side of the altar in San Paolo." John VI also promoted easterners within the episcopal hierarchy, including Boniface, the papal counselor.

== Notes ==
Catholic Church titles
Preceded by Sergius I	Pope; 701–705	Succeeded by John VII
