= Raginpert =

King of the Lombards in 701

Raginpert (also Raghinpert or Reginbert) was the Duke of Turin and then King of the Lombards briefly in 701. He was the son of Godepert and grandson of Aripert I. He usurped the throne in 701 and removed Liutpert, his grandnephew, putting his son Aripert in line for the succession. He and his Neustrians (men of Piedmont) went out to meet the regent, Ansprand, in battle and defeated him at Novara, but died shortly after. His son Aripert did not succeed in taking the throne right away.

== Notes ==
Regnal titles
Preceded by Garibald	Duke of Turin; 671–701	Succeeded by Aripert II
Preceded by Liutpert	King of the Lombards; 701	Succeeded by Aripert II
