= Imberg =

Imberg (8th-century – d. before 744) was a Duchess consort of Asti, and duchess regent of Asti after the death of her son.

She was the daughter of Ansprand and the sister of Liutprand, King of the Lombards. Her father, who may have been the Duke of Asti prior to becoming king, arranged a marriage between Imberg and Theodon of Asti, and appointed his son-in-law as duke of Asti. She was widowed at an unknown date.

At this point, her brother Liutprand had become king, and he allowed for his sister's son Ansulf to become duke. Her son, however, died on an unknown date after a short rule. No longer having a son, Imberg was allowed by her brother the king to become duchess regnant of Asti herself. However, there is no documentation preserved of her reign, nor are there dates of her birth, death or accession. It is known that she was dead by the time her brother died in 744, as Aliprand was appointed Duke of Asti in that year.
