= Euin =

Lombard duke of Trent

Euin (died 595), also Ewin or Eoin, was the first Lombard Duke of Trent (from 569) during the Rule of the Dukes, an interregnum (575–585) during which the Kingdom of Italy was ruled by its regional magnates, the dukes of the thirty or so cities. Euin participated in several significant wars during his long reign. The primary source for his career is Paul the Deacon's Historia Langobardorum.

In 584 the Frankish kings Guntram of Burgundy and Childebert II of Austrasia invaded northeastern Italy. The fortress Anagnis, north of Trent, surrendered to them and was consequently the victim of a plundering expedition by Ragilo, the Lombard count of Lagaris. Ragilo and his army, however, were attacked in the field of "Rotalian" by a Frankish army under Chramnichis. Ragilo and many of his followers, still with their booty, were killed. Chramnichis then moved on to "devastate Trent", but probably this phrase (in Paul the Deacon) refers not to a Frankish occupation of the city itself but just a raid of its environs. At Salurnis, Euin, the duke of Trent, ambushed Chramnichis and killed him. He took the Franks' booty and regained the booty collected by Ragilo. He then drove the Franks from the duchy of Trent.

Paul records that it was around this time, when Sigebert I of Austrasia was assassinated by Chilperic I of Neustria (584), that Euin married a daughter of Garibald I, whom Paul refers to as "king of the Bavarians". The elder sister of Euin's wife was Theudelinda, who in 589 married the Lombard king Authari.

In 587 Authari sent an army under Euin into Istria. By tactics Paul only describes as "plunderings and burnings", Euin established peace for a year and returned with a large tribute for Authari. In 590 Childebert invaded Italy with an army led by twenty dukes, notably Auduald, Olo, and Cedinus. Olo was killed trying to take Bilitio and Auduald, with six other dukes, camped outside Milan waiting for the army of the Byzantine emperor Maurice, which never came. Cedinus, with thirteen dukes, invaded the northeast, and marched west. In the duchy of Trent he destroyed the fortresses of Tesana, Maletum, Sermiana, Appianum, Fagitana, Cimbra, Vitianum, Bremtonicum, Volaenes, and Ennemase. With dysentery racking his army and the Byzantine reinforcements yet to show up, Cedinus made a ten-month truce and returned across the Alps. In May 591, Authari's successor, Agilulf, sent Agnellus, Bishop of Trent, to the Frankish court of Brunhilda to secure the ransom of several Tridentine prisoners captured in the previous war, which he did. At that same time Euin went to the Franks to negotiate a peace, which he did.

Euin was dead by January 595, when he was replaced by Gaidoald, described by Paul as "a good man and a Catholic in religion".
