= Grimoald II of Benevento =

Grimoald II (died 689) was the duke of Benevento from 687 to his death. He was the son and successor of Romuald I of Benevento. He was possibly under the regency of his mother, Theodrada, daughter of Lupus of Friuli. His reign of three years was uneventful: Paul the Deacon records nothing but his marriage and death. He is said to have been an opponent of the crown. He was succeeded by his brother Gisulf. He was married to Wigilinda, daughter of King Perctarit.

== Sources ==
- Paul the Deacon. Historia Langobardorum. Available at Northvegr.

Regnal titles
Preceded by Romoald I	Duke of Benevento; 687–689	Succeeded by Gisulf I
