= Perctarit =

King of the Lombards, 661–62 and 671–688

- King of the Lombards
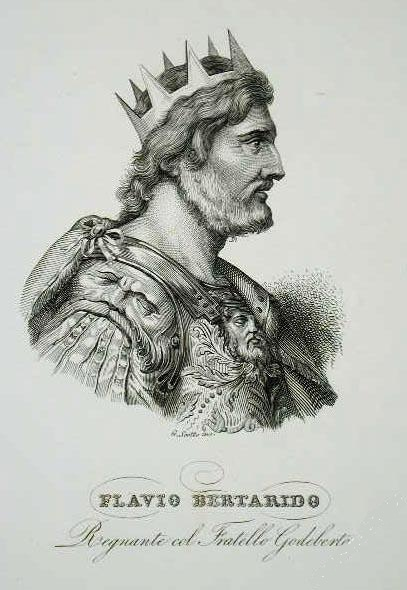
- Fantasy portrait of Perctarit
- Reign: 661–662 (with Godepert); 671–688
- Predecessor: Aripert I (first reign); Garibald (second reign)
- Successor: Grimoald (first reign); Cunipert (second reign)
- Died: 688
- Spouse: Rodelinda
- Issue: Cunipert
- House: Bavarian
- Father: Aripert I
- Religion: Chalcedonian Christianity

Perctarit (also Berthari; died 688) was the first Catholic king of the Lombards, leading a religiously divided kingdom during the 7th century. He ruled first from 661 to 662, and again from 671 to 688. He is notable for making Catholicism the official religion, sparing the life of an invading leader, and commissioning construction projects around the capital.

He was one of two sons and successors of Aripert I who took power after the assassination of Rodoald. He shared power with his older brother Godepert. They were from the Bavarian dynasty kings of the Lombards who descended from Garibald I.

== Context of Lombard Politics ==
Perctarit ruled from Milan, Godepert from Pavia. He was a Catholic, whereas Godepert was an Arian. Aripert I was a Chalcedonian Christian a branch of Christianity upheld by Catholicism. Arian Christianity was seen in the Lombards from Rodoald who preceded Aripert I after Rodoald was assassinated in 653. Faith differences split the two brothers as tensions rose in the kingdom with zealous vassals looking for power. Perctarit’s reign shows the instability that was typical for many Lombard Kings.

In 6th and 7th century, any aspirant to power in Lombard politics might obtain legitimacy by becoming married to or deriving from a female member of the Lombard royal dynasty. The fact that Aripert I was the nephew of the well-known Lombard Queen Theodelinda may have played an integral part in his claim to the throne. Marrying a former queen or daughter of a monarch is a way to claim power.

The cultural origins of the Lombards are shown in the Origo Gentis Langobardorum mentioning many pagan aspects of heroes, deities, and linking Lombards to brave and honorable lineage that is vital to understanding early Lombard culture. The Pagan roots of Lombard people helps to understand the religious and societal divide encountered during this power struggle between Grimoald and Perctarit’s reign.

Godepert called for the aid of Duke Grimoald I of Benevento in a war with Perctarit but Grimoald instead chose to attack Godepert who ruled over Pavia the capital city of the kingdom of the Lombards. The city held cultural significance for Lombard identity and held a special value as their promised land. This meaning had strong ties to Christianity as King Alboin had mercy on Christians when taking the city for the Lombards. Pavia became the capital of the Lombard monarchy. This is significant to Grimoald as he was an outsider to the current Lombard royal dynasty.

The Beneventan had Godepert assassinated and took control of the kingdom, forcing Perctarit to flee. Perctarit first arrived at the court of the Avar khagan Kakar. Meanwhile, his wife, Rodelinde, and their son Cunincpert were captured by Grimoald and sent to Benevento. Perctarit returned soon thereafter to conspire against Grimoald, but fled again to Francia. When Grimoald concluded a treaty with the Franks, Perctarit prepared to flee to Britain, but news of Grimoald's death reached him first.

== Rule of Grimoald and Division in Kingdom ==
In 662, shortly after Perctarit and Godepert took power, a plot was brewing to remove the brother co-kings and install one of the Lombard dukes in their place. The leader against the co-kings was Grimoald I of Benevento with support from Garipald of Turin as an insider. Godepert mistrusted Garipald and kept him close as a diplomat and advisor. Garipald served Duke Grimoald's interests instead of Godepert’s. Godepert was reported to have been unaware that Duke Grimoald had amassed an army and was advancing on Pavia due to Garipald's misinformation and sabotage. According to narrative, Grimoald was greeted warmly by King Godepert, who was unaware of the danger he was in, upon the rebellious duke's arrival at the king's palace. Grimoald was invited to stay in the palace and enjoy feasts and entertainment. Grimoald took the throne after King Godepert was fatally stabbed during his stay.

After killing Godepert, Grimoald acts quickly and confirms his claim to the throne by marrying into the royal Lombard bloodline. He marries a daughter of Aripert I, a sister of Godepert, to claim his spot as King of the Lombards. Grimoald attempted to kill Perctarit as well forcing him to flee any assassination attempts.

Grimoald’s reign shows the divide between Christians with Arians and Catholics both wanting to be the official religion. Yet, Pagan traditionalists are still popular in the Lombards as well. These three groups are fighting for support from the King and Grimoald causes divides that Perctarit will later try to mend. The Easter Day capture of Forlì by Grimoald caused unrest between pagans and Orthodox Christians, as many Christians were killed in the celebrations. This act of violence against Christians shows that Paganism is not as inconsequential to Lombard society as even though Christianity has played a strong role in the foundation of the Lombard empire and conquest of the Italian Peninsula.

While Perctarit has fled, Grimoald has troubles from invading forces trying to take over. Notably the Avars into Venetia which he repelled and a Frankish army that was sent from the Western Alps. Constans II launched an attack on Grimoald while Frankish forces attacked yet the Lombards held as Constans forces got held up in other battles. With these important victories for the Lombards Grimoald was held in a popular view. Despite some popularity, when he is assassinated in 671 the Lombards do not elect the new King to be either of his two sons or his daughter. Instead, they choose to recall their exiled King Perctarit after 10 years to return as King of the Lombards. Perctarit prepared to sail to Britain, but news of Grimoald's death reached him first and he returned to Italy.

== Return, Catholicism, Impact ==
Perctarit's monogram, found on silver denarii he minted after 672

In 671, Perctarit returned from exile and reclaimed his realm, which was being ruled on behalf of Grimoald's son Garibald. He reigned for seventeen years (672–688) as a man of religion making Catholicism the official religion after Godepert co-ruling previously split branches of faith. The switch to Catholicism was significant as Perctarit would try to maintain peace in the kingdom where many of Perctarit’s predecessors’ reigns had only lasted around fifteen years. The danger associated with being King of the Lombards showed the instability of the kingdom, yet Perctarit made strives for peace even with other kingdoms. Perctarit was not interested in conquering lands but instead making peace with the Byzantines. He sought to put down the rebellion of Alagis, duke of Trent. It was to be his only campaign; he captured the duke, then pardoned and released him. He chose to spare the duke as he was more focused on Catholic faith.

He is responsible for the building of the famous nunnery of Saint Agatha and Church of the Virgin outside of Pavia the capital city. These building projects aim to strengthen the Catholicism in Lombard society and unite the people under one branch of Christianity. Perctarit is significant to the cultural context of the Lombards as he introduced Catholicism to the empire but does not validate papal authority which is a trend that will continue within the Lombards. Being in such close ties to the Pope this will later become a problem the Carolingians will have to help solve.

Cunipert, son of Perctarit, provided aid and guidance during the reign of his father starting in Perctarit’s eighth year. Cunipert supported him through the last ten years of his reign. In History of the Langobards Paul describes Cunipert as influential to Perctarit’s mercy on Alahis after he was captured during the rebellion. Cunipert succeeded Perctarit as king after he was killed in 688. He was succeeded by his more combative son, who would battle against the man his father had captured and released.

His daughter Wigilinda married Duke Grimoald II of Benevento, son of Romuald I of Benevento. Perctarit and Rodelinde themselves were to live on in opera as the Bertarido and Rodelinda of Handel's Rodelinda, Regina de' Longobardi, though not much of their actual history survived in Nicola Francesco Haym's libretto, drawn more from Pierre Corneille's Pertharite than from Historia Langobardorum. He was buried in the Basilica of Santissimo Salvatore in Pavia.

Perctarit forced the Jews in his kingdom to adopt Christianity in the year 661. “Those who refused were exterminated at the point of the sword”, as the historian Salo W. Baron (1895-1989) pointed out on pp. 32-33 in Vol. 3 Vol. 3, Heirs of Rome and Persia in the : High Middle Ages 500-1200 part of his famous A social and religious history of the Jews.

And indeed, another source puts it this way: "The only exception that we can find to the generally mild character of Perctarit's rule is his treatment of the Jewish people. Like the Visigoths, the Lombards would seem to have written their adhesion to their new faith in the blood and tears of the Hebrew. We learn from the rude poem on the Synod of Pavia that Perctarit caused the Jews to be baptized, and ordered all who refused to believe to be slain with the sword". These are the words of Thomas Hodgkin, in Chapter 7 of his Italy and Her Invaders, 2nd edition, Oxford University Press, 1896. That chapter is accessible on the Web at https://penelope.uchicago.edu/Thayer/E/Gazetteer/Places/Europe/Italy/_Texts/HODIHI/2d_edition/7/7*.html#:~:text=We%20learn%20from%20the%20rude,be%20slain%20with%20the%20sword.

The Latin lines of verse are as follows:

'Subolis item Berthari (sic) in solium

Regni suffectus, imitatus protinus

Exempla patris, ad fidem convertere

Judaeos fecit baptizandos, credere

Qui rennuerunt, gladium peremere.'

(Carmen de Synodo Ticinensi)

Regnal titles
Preceded by Aripert I	King of the Lombards; 661–662	Succeeded by Grimoald
Preceded by Garibald	King of the Lombards; 671–688	Succeeded by Cunipert
