= Garibald =

King of the Lombards in 671

- Reign: King of the Lombards; King of Italy
- Predecessor: Grimoald
- Successor: Perctarit
- Born: c. 655
- House: Beneventan Dynasty
- Father: Grimoald
- Mother: a daughter of Aripert I
- Religion: Arian

Garibald was the young son of Grimoald I of Benevento, king of the Lombards, and Theodota, daughter of Aripert I. After his father's death in 671, he reigned briefly for three months until the numerous adherents of Perctarit, his uncle, who had been exiled by Grimoald nine years earlier, besought their candidate to return and elected him, deposing the young king. He was the last Arian king in Europe.

== Notes ==
Regnal titles
Preceded by Grimoald	King of the Lombards; 671	Succeeded by Perctarit
Preceded by Grimoald	King of Italy; 671	Succeeded by Perctarit
