= Alahis =

King of the Lombards from 688 to 689

- King of the Lombards
- Reign: 688 – 689
- Predecessor: Cunipert
- Successor: Cunipert
- Died: 689; Coronate
- Religion: Arian

Alahis (or Alagis) (fl. 680–689) was the Arian duke of Trent and Brescia before becoming king of the Lombards after his successful rebellion in 688. He ruled for about a year.

His first rebellion against King Perctarit failed in 680, but the king captured, pardoned, and released him. He rebelled again in 688 when Perctarit's son Cunipert succeeded. He forced Cunipert to a castle on an island in the middle of Lake Como, but his rule was burdensome and tyrannical, and so he lost the support of the people. Finally, in 689, Cunipert issued forth with the men of Piedmont and defeated Alahis and the men of Venetia at the Battle of Coronate, on the Horn of the Adda, near Lodi. Alahis was defeated and slain in battle.

Regnal titles
Preceded by Cunipert	King of the Lombards; 688–689	Succeeded by Cunipert
