= Godepert =

King of the Lombards from 661 to 662

- King of the Lombards
- Reign: 661 – 662
- Predecessor: Aripert I
- Successor: Grimoald
- Co-Monarch: Perctarit
- Died: 662; Pavia
- Dynasty: Bavarian dynasty
- Father: Aripert I
- Religion: Arian

Godepert (also Gundipert, Godebert, Godipert, Godpert, Gotebert, Gotbert, Gotpert, Gosbert, or Gottbert) was king of the Lombards (crowned 661), eldest son and successor of Aripert I. He was an Arian who governed from the ancient capital, Pavia, while his brother, Perctarit, a Roman Catholic, governed from Milan. In a war with his brother, he beckoned Duke Grimoald I of Benevento, who assassinated him in his Pavian palace, the Reggia. Godepert's son Raginpert managed to escape and would later rule, but first, Grimoald would seize the throne. He was buried in the Basilica of Santissimo Salvatore in Pavia.

Regnal titles
Preceded by Aripert I	King of the Lombards; 661–662	Succeeded by Grimoald
