= Gundoald, Duke of Asti =

Gundoald or Gundwald (c. 565–616) was a Bavarian nobleman of the Agilolfing family, a son of Duke Garibald I and Waldrada, and Duke of Asti from around 589.

In 588 his elder sister Theodelinda was engaged to the king of the Lombards, Authari. The potential marriage alliance with the Lombards sparked an invasion by the Bavarians' overlords, the Franks, in 589. Theudelinda and Gundoald both fled to Italy. There Theudelinda married Authari in May, and Gundoald was invested with the duchy of Asti and the granddaughter of King Wacho in marriage. With her he had two children, Gundpert and Aripert.

Gundoald was killed by an arrow in 616.

== Sources ==
- Paul the Deacon, Historia Langobardorum.
- Chronicle of Fredegar, The Fourth Book of the Chronicle of Fredegar with its Continuations.
