= Cunipert =

King of the Lombards from 688 to 700

- King of the Lombards
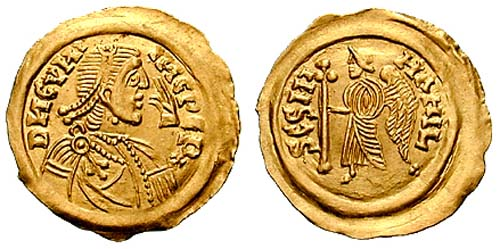
- Tremissis of Cunincpert's, minted in Milan.
- Reign: 688–689; 689–700
- Predecessor: Perctarit (first reign); Alahis (second reign)
- Successor: Alahis (first reign); Liutpert (second reign)
- Died: 700
- Dynasty: Bavarian
- Father: Perctarit

Cunipert (also Cunibert or Cunincpert) was king of the Lombards from 688 to 700. He succeeded his father Perctarit, though he was associated with the throne from 680.

== Life ==
Soon after his assumption of the sole kingship, Cunipert was ousted by Alahis, duke of Brescia (who had previously been duke of Trento). Alahis had also rebelled during the reign of Perctarit, but it was Cunipert who, according to Paul the Deacon in the Historia Langobardorum, had persuaded his father to show mercy. Perctarit is reported to have warned his son of the consequences. It was thus soon after Perctarit's death that Alahis forced Cunipert to flee to Isola Comacina, an island in the middle of Lake Como.

The only extant record of the rule of Alahis is contained in Book V of Paul the Deacon's Historia Langobardorum. His rule is portrayed as burdensome and tyrannical, and particularly antagonistic to the Catholic Church. Having lost the support of the Church and, crucially, of the 'people' (notably the brothers Aldo and Grauso of Brescia), Cunipert was able to return to Pavia and resume control. Alahis, however, was able to acquire sufficient support to bring the matter to battle. Cunipert, with the men of Piedmont, defeated Alahis and the men of Venetia at the Battle of Coronate, on the Horn of the Adda, near Lodi, in 689. Alahis was slain in battle.

Cunipert suppressed other insurrections during his reign, including that of the usurper Duke Ansfrid of Friuli.

He also successfully settled the schism of the Three Chapters in the Italian Church between the patriarch of Aquileia and his rival patriarch of Grado.

He died in 700 and was succeeded by his young son Liutpert, the regent Ansprand, and many rebels. Many wars took place during his reign. He is notably the first Lombard monarch to strike coins in his image. (For his epitaph, see Latin rhythmic hexameter.) He was buried in the Basilica of Santissimo Salvatore in Pavia.

Regnal titles
Preceded by Perctarit	King of the Lombards; 688–689	Succeeded by Alahis
Preceded by Alahis	King of the Lombards; 689–700	Succeeded by Liutpert
