= Duchy of Tridentum =

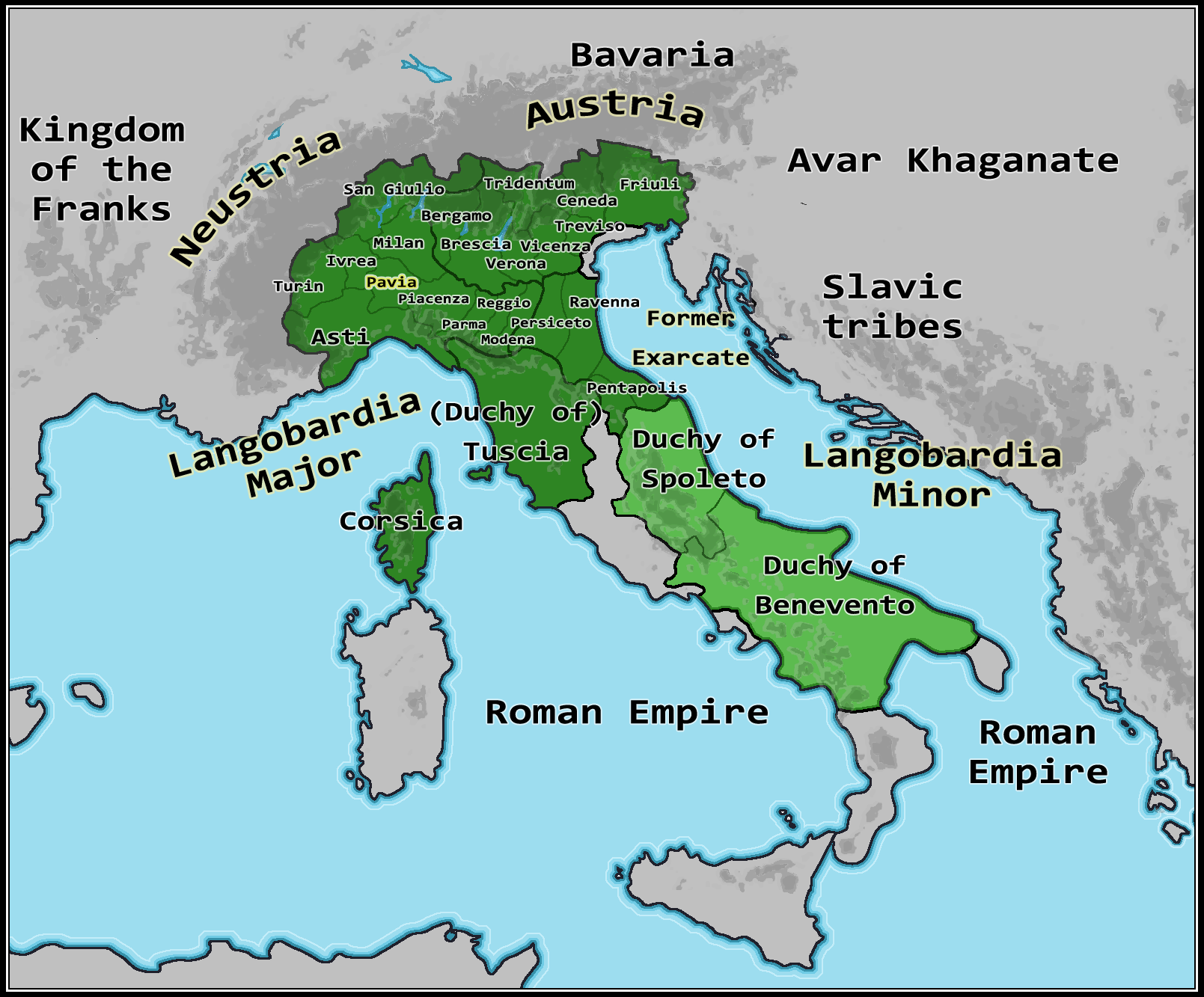
The Lombard Kingdom of Italy with the duchy in the northeast.

The Duchy of Tridentum (Trent) was an autonomous Lombard duchy, established by Euin during the Lombard interregnum of 574–584 that followed the assassination of the Lombard leader Alboin. The stronghold of Euin's territory was the Roman city of Tridentum in the upper valley of the Adige, in the foothills of the Alps in northern Italy, where the duchy formed one of the marches of the Lombard Kingdom of Italy. There he shared power with the bishop, who was nominally subject to the Patriarch of Aquileia. In 574–75, Lombard raiding parties pillaged the valley of the Rhône, incurring retaliatory raids into the duchy by Austrasian Franks, who had seized control of the mountain passes leading into the kingdom of Burgundy. Euin was at the head of the army loyal to Authari that went into the territory of the duke of Friuli in Istria, c 589, and he was sent by Agilulf to make peace with the Franks his neighbors, in 591. After Euin's death c 595, Agilulf installed Gaidoald, who was a Catholic, rather than an Arian Christian. After some friction between king and duke, they were reconciled in 600. The separate Lombard duchy of Brescia was united with Tridentum in the person of Alagis, a fervent Arian and opponent of the Lombard king, Perctarit, who was killed in the battle of Cornate d'Adda (688).

With the collapse of the Lombard kingdom in 773–74, the duchy of Tridentum passed into Frankish control and was transformed. After German king Otto I had subdued the Italian kingdom in 952 he incorporated Tridentum into the March of Verona. Its strategic position controlling the Alpine mountain passes encouraged the eleventh-century Holy Roman Emperors to invest the Bishop Ulrich II of Trent with temporal powers over a sizable territory, as an independent prince of the Empire, with the powers and privileges of a duke. A succession of Prince-Bishops ruled, except for a few short intervals, until 1802, when the bishopric was secularized and became a part of Austrian Tyrol.
