= Liutpert =

King of the Lombards from 700 to 702

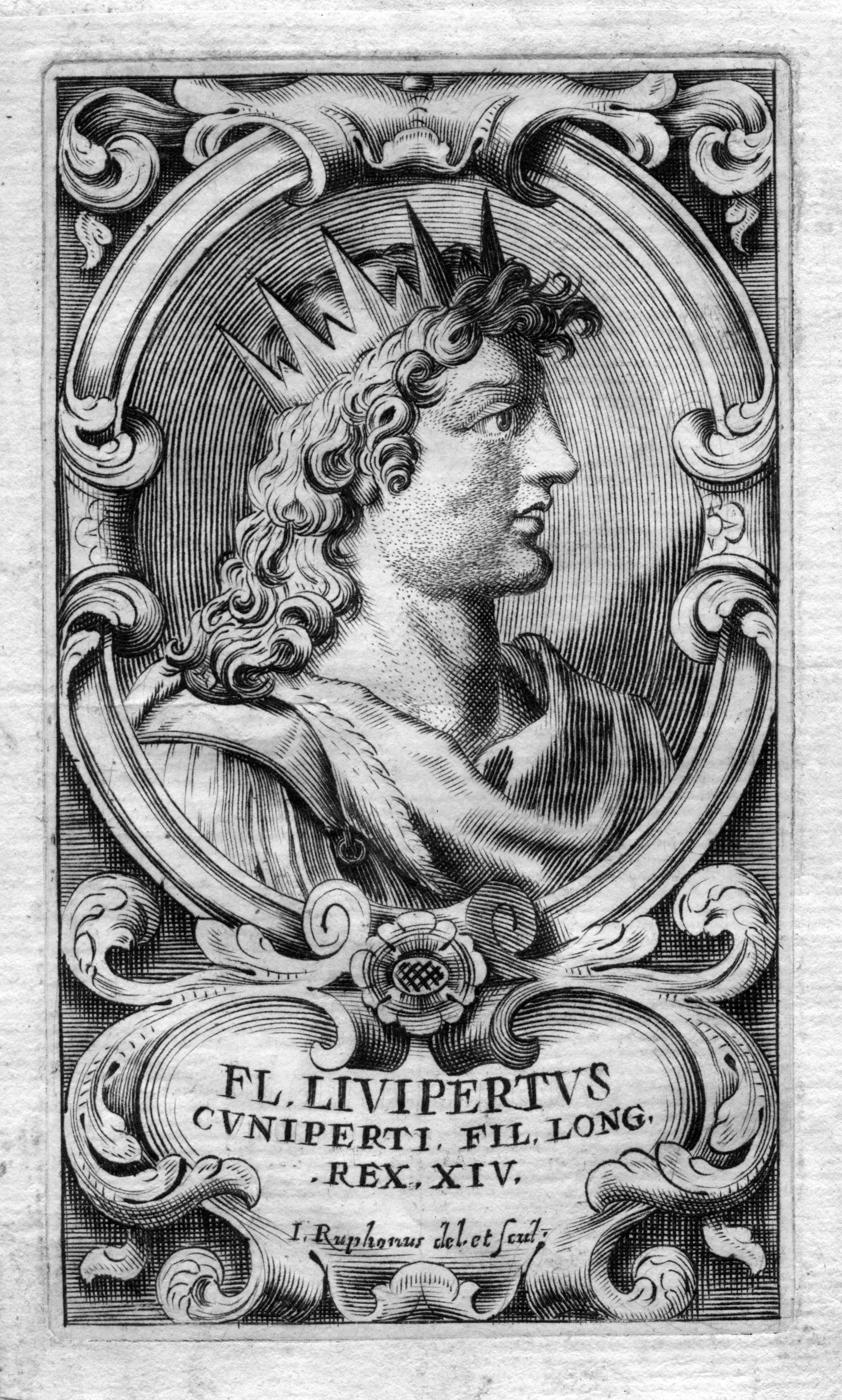

Liutpert (or Liutbert) (died 702) was the Lombard king of Italy between 700 and 702, with interruption. Upon succeeding his father, King Cunincpert, at a young age, he ruled together with his tutor, Ansprand, the duke of Asti. After eight months, he was deposed by Raginpert, the duke of Turin and son of Godepert, Liutpert's great-uncle, but succeeded in returning to the throne several months later upon Raginpert's death, only to be deposed again, taken captive from Pavia, and drowned by Aripert II, Raginpert's son. He was buried in the Basilica of Santissimo Salvatore in Pavia.

== Notes ==
Regnal titles
Preceded by Cunipert	King of the Lombards; 700–702	Succeeded by Raginpert
