= Rodoald =

King of the Lombards from 652 to 653

- King of the Lombards
- Reign: 652 – 653
- Predecessor: Rothari
- Successor: Aripert I
- Born: c. 630
- Died: 653
- Dynasty: Harodingian
- Father: Rothari
- Religion: Arian

Rodoald (or Rodwald), (c. 630 – 653) was a Lombard king of Italy, who succeeded his father Rothari on the throne in 652. He was said to be lecherous and he was assassinated after a reign of just six months in 653 by the husband of one of his lovers. Paul the Deacon writes that Rodoald "had reigned five years and seven days, " (more probably five months and seven days), although historians note that this length of reign is suspect. Aripert, a rival claimant, was elected with the support of the Catholic Church, which opposed the Arian monarchy.

== Sources ==
- Paul the Deacon (1907). History of the Lombards. Translated by Foulke, William Dudley. Philadelphia: University of Pennsylvania. See book IV, chapters 47−48, for Rodoald's reign.

Regnal titles
Preceded by Rothari	King of the Lombards; 652–653	Succeeded by Aripert I
