= Ansprand =

King of the Lombards in 712

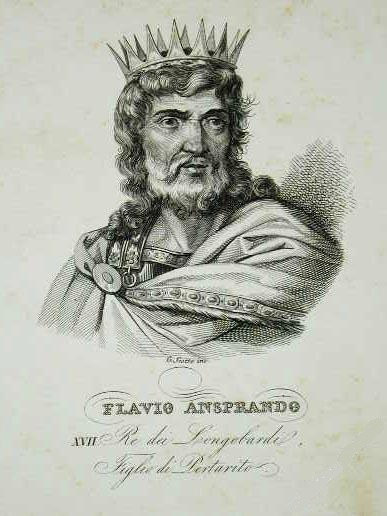

Ansprand (c. 657 – 712) was king of the Lombards briefly in 712. Before that, he was the duke of Asti and regent during the minority of Liutpert (700–701). He was defeated at Novara by Raginpert and exiled during the subsequent war over the succession, fleeing to the court of Theudebert, duke of Bavaria, in 702.

In 711, he returned with a large army from the duke. Many Austrians (the men of Venetia and the east) joined the returning regent and battle ensued near Pavia, between his forces and those of King Aripert II, who had usurped the throne. Aripert fled to his capital when the tide went against him, but he hoarded the treasures and tried to cross over into Gaul by night. He drowned in the Ticino River and Ansprand was acclaimed sovereign.

He ascended the throne in March and died in June, leaving his only surviving son, Liutprand, the kingdom. He was married to Teudelinda (8th-century), and was the father of Imberg.

== Notes ==
Regnal titles
Preceded by Aripert II	King of the Lombards; 712	Succeeded by Liutprand
