= Rodelinda (7th century) =

Lombard queen consort and wife of King Perctarit

Rodelinda (7th-century – d. 700) was a Lombard queen consort by marriage to king Perctarit.

She was the mother of Cunipert. She and her children spent ten years as hostages in Benevento after the deposition of her spouse in 662 until he took the throne a second time in 671. She appears to have been politically active during the second period of her spouse's reign: her son refers to her as ruler, she was the ruler in the capital in the absence of her husband during the rebellion of the Duke of Trento, and effected the succession of her son to the throne in 688.
