= List of kings of the Lombards =

The kings of the Lombards or reges Langobardorum (singular rex Langobardorum) were the monarchs of the Lombard people from the early 6th century until the Lombardic identity became lost in the 9th and 10th centuries. After 774, the kings were not Lombards, but Franks. From the 12th century, the votive crown and reliquary known as the Iron Crown (Corona Ferrea) retrospectively became a symbol of their rule, though it was never used by Lombard kings.

The primary sources for the Lombard kings before the Frankish conquest are the anonymous 7th-century Origo Gentis Langobardorum and the 8th-century Historia Langobardorum of Paul the Deacon. The earliest kings (the pre-Lethings) listed in the Origo are almost certainly legendary. They purportedly reigned during the Migration Period. The first ruler attested independently of Lombard tradition is Tato.

== Early rulers ==
=== Legendary rulers ===
- Sceafa, legendary king of the Lombards in the Widsith.
- Ybor and Agio, brothers, together with their mother Gambara, who led the emigration from Scandinavia
- Agilmund, son of Agio
- Laiamicho (Lamissio)
- Ortnit

=== Lething dynasty ===
The Lethings were an early dynasty from the time of Lethuc. The last ruling descendant of Lethuc was Walthari, whose son was in turn displaced by Audoin of the family of the Gausi.

- Lethuc (fl. c. 400), ruled for some 40 years.
- Aldihoc (mid-5th century)
- Godehoc (480s), led the Lombards into modern-day Austria
- Claffo (fl. c. 500)
- Tato (early 6th century, died perhaps 510), his son Ildichus died in exile
- Wacho (510–539), son of Unichus
- Walthari (539–546), son of Wacho

=== Gausian dynasty ===
- Audoin (546–565), Eadwine in the Widsith, led the Lombards into Pannonia

== Kings in Italy ==
=== Gausian dynasty ===
- Alboin (565–572), Ælfwine in the Widsith, led the Lombards into Italy

=== Unnamed dynasty ===
- Cleph (572–574)

Rule of the Dukes (Ten year interregnum)

- Authari (584–590), son of previous
- Agilulf (591–c. 616), cousin of previous

=== Bavarian dynasty ===
- Adaloald (c. 616–c. 626)

=== Non-dynastic king ===
- Arioald (c. 626–636)

=== Harodingians ===
- Rothari (636–652)
- Rodoald (652–653)

=== Bavarian dynasty, First Restoration ===
- Aripert I (653–661)
- Perctarit and Godepert (661–662)

=== Beneventan dynasty ===
- Grimuald (662–671)
- Garibald (671)

=== Bavarian dynasty, Second Restoration ===
- Perctarit (671–688) (restored from exile)
- Alahis (688–689), rebel
- Cunincpert (688–700)
- Liutpert (700–701)
- Raginpert (701)
- Aripert II (701–712)

=== Non-dynastic kings ===
- Ansprand (712)
- Liutprand (712–744)
- Hildeprand (744)
- Ratchis (744–749)
- Aistulf (749–756)
- Desiderius (756–774)

=== Carolingian dynasty ===
Charlemagne conquered the Lombards in 774 at the invitation of Pope Adrian I.

- Charlemagne (774–781) in personal union, passed kingship to his third son, Pepin.
- Pepin (or Pippin) (781–810), king under authority of Charlemagne
- Bernard (810–818)
- Lothair I (818–839)
- Louis II (839–875)

The title rex Langobardorum, synonymous with rex Italiae, lasted well into the High Middle Ages, but subsequent holders are found at King of Italy. For the kings after the Congress of Vienna see King of Lombardy-Venetia.

== Family tree ==
Family tree of Lombards Kings

The colors denotes the monarchs from the Houses of:

- Lething dynasty

- Gausian dynasty

- Unnamed dynasty

- Bavarian dynasty

- Non-dynastic king

- Harodingians

- Beneventan dynasty

- Carolingian dynasty

- Ruler of the Kingdom of Lombards (Regnum Langobardorum / Regnum totius Italiae)

Lethuc
Aldihoc
Godehoc
Claffo
Tato died 510	Unichus
Wacho r. 510-539	Austrigusa of the Gepids fl. 531	Audoin r. 545-565
Cleph ?-572-574	Walthari; 539-546	Garibald I of Bavaria; 540-591	Waldrada of Neustria; 531-572	Theudebald of Austrasia	Grasulf I of Friuli died 571	Alboin; 530-565-572
Authari; 540-84-90	Theodelinda of Bavaria; 570-628	Agilulf; 555-590-616	Gundoald; Duke of Asti; 565-616	Gisulf I of Friuli died 590	Tassilo I of Bavaria; 560-610
Rothari; 606-636-652	Gundeberga born 591	Arioald ?-626-636	Adaloald; 602-616- 626-628	Aripert I ?-653-661	Romilda of Friuli died 611	Gisulf II of Friuli died 611	Garibald II of Bavaria; 585-625
Rodoald; 637-652-653	Rodelinda	Perctarit ?-661-662- 671-688	Godepert ?-661-662	Theodota(?)	Grimoald; 610-662-671	Gella of Friuli	Theodo V of Bavaria; 625-716
Alahis r. 689	Cunipert r. 688-689, 689-700	Raginpert r. 701	Ansprand; 657-712-712	Garibald r. 671	Gotfrid of Alemannia died 709	daughter, name unknown
Liutpert r. 700- 701, 702	Aripert II r. 701-702, 702-712	Pemmo of Friuli died 739	Ritpurga	sibling, name unknown	Liutprand r. 712-744	Odilo of Bavaria died 748
Ratchis r. 744-749	Aistulf ?-749-756	Hildeprand r. 735-744	Desiderius ?-756-774-786
Hildegard; 754-783	Charles the Great; 748-778-814	Desiderata fl. 770	Liutperga fl. 763	Tassilo III of Bavaria; 741-796
kings of Italy

== Sources ==
- Oman, Charles (1914). The Dark Ages, 476–918 (Sixth ed.). London: Rivingtons.
