= Aripert II =

King of the Lombards from 701 to 712

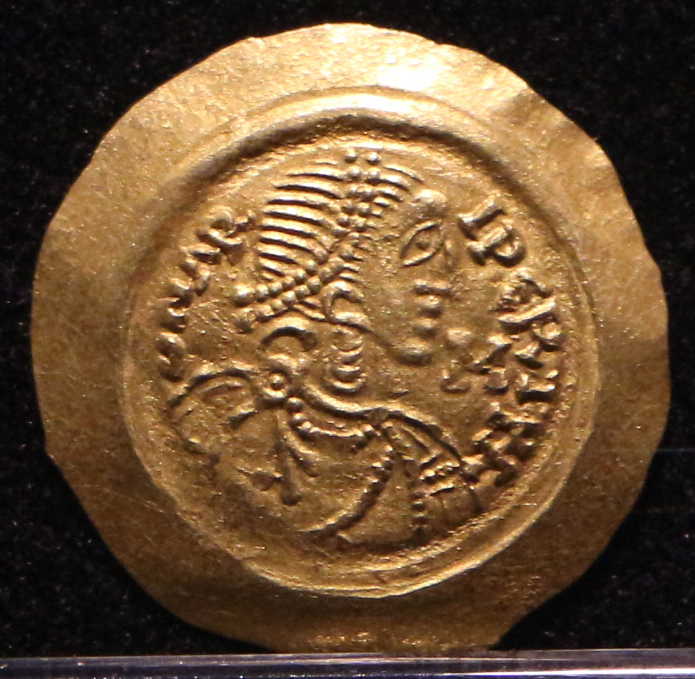
Tremissis minted at Pavia, bearing an effigy of Aripert II.

Aripert II (also spelled Aribert) was the king of the Lombards from 701 to 712. Duke of Turin and son of King Raginpert, and thus a scion of the Bavarian Dynasty, he was associated with the throne as early as 700. He was removed by Liutpert, who reigned from 700 to 702, with the exception of the year 701, when Raginpert seized the throne. After his father's death, he tried to take the throne, too. He defeated Liutpert and the regent Ansprand's men at Pavia and captured the king, whom he later had strangled in his bath. He seized the capital and forced Ansprand over the Alps. He was firmly in power by 703.

He thence reigned uninterrupted until his death. His reign was a troubled one. In 703, Faroald, duke of Spoleto, attacked the Exarchate of Ravenna, but Aripert refused to assist him, for he wanted good relations with papacy and empire. He tried nevertheless to assert his authority over Spoleto and Benevento in the Mezzogiorno. He nursed friendship with Pope John VI by donating vast tracts of land in the Cottian Alps to the Holy See. This friendship helped him little, for he had many rebellions to deal with and many Slovene raids into Venetia.

In 711, Ansprand, whom he had exiled, returned with a large army from the duke of Bavaria, Theudebert. Many Austrians (the men of Venetia and the east) joined the returning regent and battle was joined by Pavia. Aripert fled to his capital when the tide went against him, but he hoarded the treasures and tried to cross over into Gaul by night. He drowned in the River Ticino and Ansprand was acclaimed sovereign. He was the last Bavarian to wear the Iron Crown. He was buried in the Basilica of Santissimo Salvatore in Pavia.

== Notes ==
Regnal titles
Preceded by Raginpert	Duke of Turin; 702–712	Unknown
Preceded by Raginpert	King of the Lombards; 702–712	Succeeded by Ansprand
