= Aripert I =

King of the Lombards from 653 to 661

- King of the Lombards
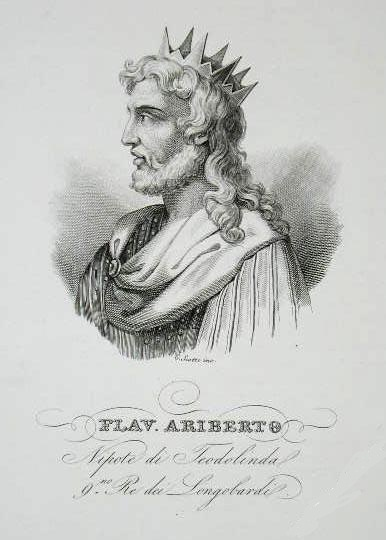
- Fantasy portrait of Aripert I
- Reign: 653 – 661
- Predecessor: Rodoald
- Successor: Godepert and Perctarit
- Dynasty: Bavarian dynasty
- Father: Gundoald, Duke of Asti
- Religion: Chalcedonian Christian

Aripert I (also spelled Aribert) was king of the Lombards (653–661) in Italy. He was the son of Gundoald, Duke of Asti, who had crossed the Alps from Bavaria with his sister Theodelinda. As a relative of the Bavarian ducal house, his was called the Bavarian Dynasty.

He was the first Chalcedonian Christian king of the Lombards, elected after the assassination of the Arian Rodoald. Not a warrior, he is mostly renowned for his church foundings. He spread Catholicism over the whole Lombard realm and built the Church of the Saviour in Pavia, the capital. He left the kingdom in a state of peace, asking the nobles to elect jointly his two sons, Perctarit and Godepert, which they did.

== Notes ==
Regnal titles
Preceded by Rodoald	King of the Lombards; 653–661	Succeeded by Godepert
Preceded by Rodoald	King of the Lombards; 653–661	Succeeded by Perctarit
