= Byzantine senate =

4th–13th century political institution

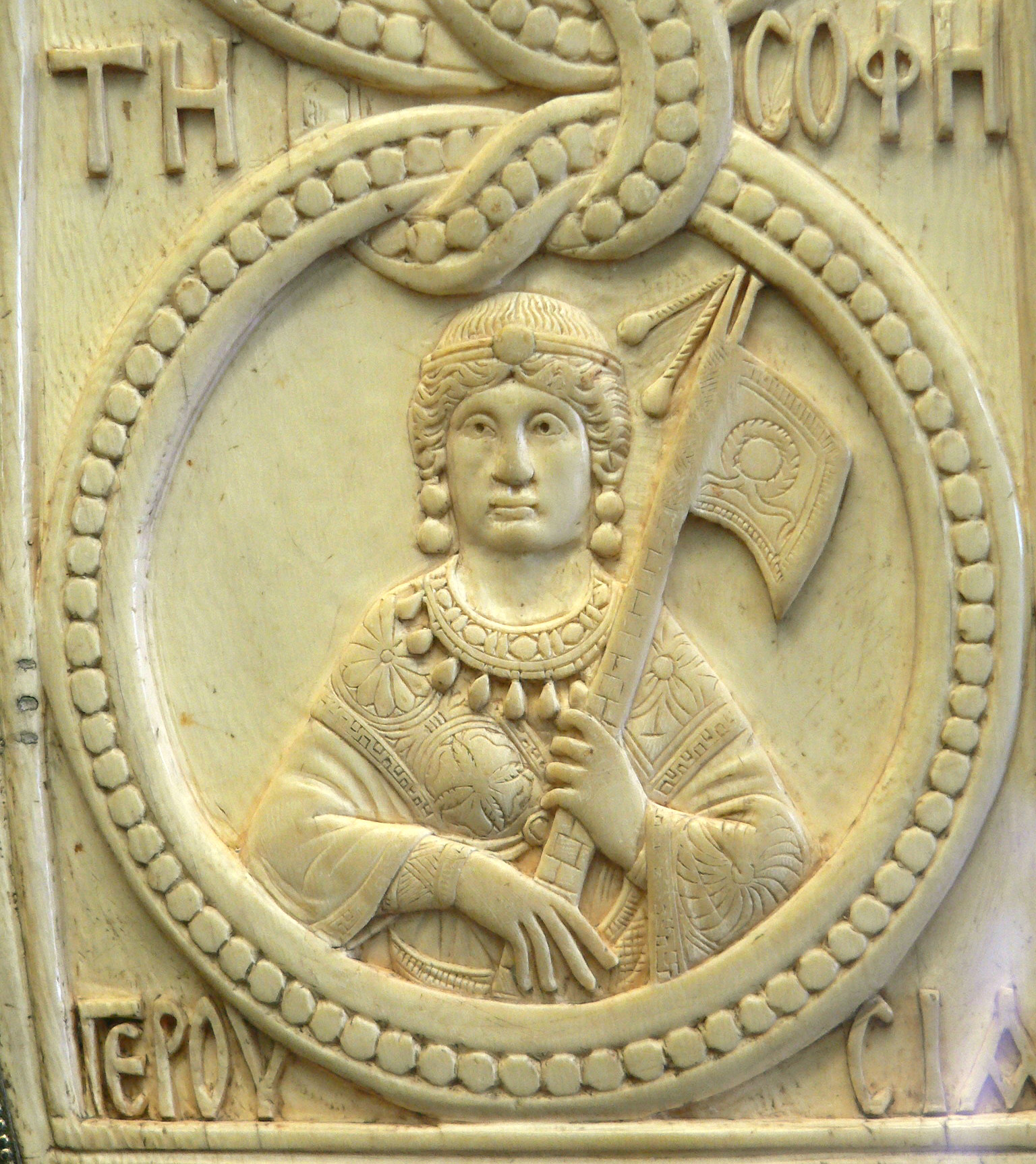
Personification of the senate, from the consular diptych of Theodore Philoxenus, 525 AD

The Byzantine senate or Eastern Roman senate (Greek: Σύγκλητος, Synklētos, or Γερουσία, Gerousia) was a continuation of the Roman Senate, established in the 4th century by Constantine I. It survived for centuries, but the senate's powers varied greatly during its history and gradually diminished until its eventual disappearance in the 13th century.

The senate of the Byzantine Empire originally consisted of Roman senators who happened to live in the East, or those who wanted to move to Constantinople, and a few other bureaucrats who were appointed to the senate. Constantine offered free land and grain to any Roman senators who were willing to move to the East. When Constantine founded the Eastern senate in Byzantium, it initially resembled the councils of important cities like Antioch rather than the Roman Senate. His son Constantius II raised it from the position of a municipal to that of an imperial body but the senate in Constantinople had essentially the same limited powers as the senate in Rome. Constantius II increased the number of senators to 2,000 by including his friends, courtiers, and various provincial officials.

== Admission and composition ==
The traditional principles that senatorial rank was hereditary and that the normal way of becoming a member of the senate itself was by holding a magistracy still remained in full force. By the time of the permanent division of the Roman Empire in 395, praetors' responsibilities had been reduced to a purely municipal role. Their sole duty was to manage the spending of money on the exhibition of games or on public works. However, with the decline of the other traditional Roman offices such as that of tribune the praetorship remained an important portal through which aristocrats could gain access to either the Western or Eastern Senates. The praetorship was a costly position to hold as praetors were expected to possess a treasury from which they could draw funds for their municipal duties. There are known to have been eight praetors in the Eastern Roman Empire who shared the financial burden between them. The late eastern Roman senate was very different from the Republican senate as the offices of aedile and tribune had long fallen into abeyance and by the end of the 4th century the quaestorship was on the point of disappearing, save as a provincial magistrate. The emperor or the senate itself could also issue a decree to grant a man not born into the senatorial order a seat in the senate. Exemption from the expensive position of praetor would also often be conferred on such persons that had become senators in this way.

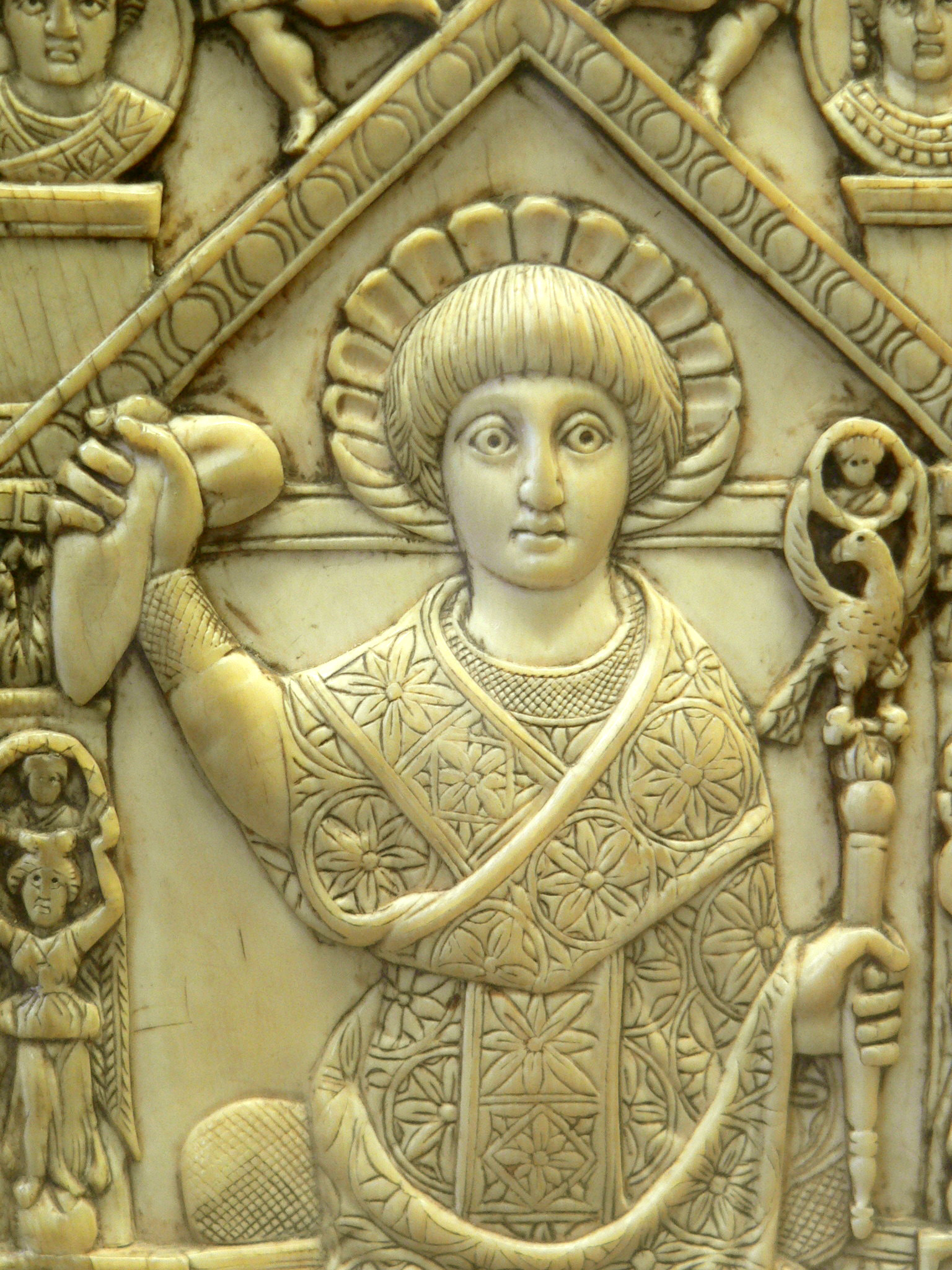
Consul Anastasius, from his consular diptych, 517 AD. He holds a consular scepter topped by an eagle and the mappa, a piece of cloth that was thrown to signify the start of the Hippodrome races that marked the beginning of a consulship

The senate was mostly composed of statesmen and officials, ranging from the most important statesmen in the Empire such as the Master of Offices and the Master of Soldiers to provincial governors and retired civil servants. The senatorial families in Constantinople tended to be less affluent and less distinguished than those in the West (where the size of the senate had also been increased to 2,000 in the 4th century). Some aristocrats attempted to become senators in order to escape the difficult conditions that were imposed on them by late Roman emperors such as Diocletian (r. 284-305 AD). The curiales (Roman middle class) were often forced to become decurions where they were charged with participating in local government at their own expense as well as having to collect taxes and pay any deficits from their own pockets. As it was recognised that many who sought seats in the senate were doing so primarily to escape the harsh duties of the decurion Theodosius I decreed that they must complete their public service even if they became senators.

The senate was led by the Prefect of the City (Constantinople), who conducted all of its communications with the emperor. It was composed of three orders, the illustres, spectabiles and clarissimi. The members of the illustres were those who held the highest offices in Eastern Rome, such as the master of soldiers and praetorian prefects. The spectabiles formed the middle class of the senate and consisted of important statesmen such as proconsuls, vicars and military governors of the provinces. The clarissimi was the lower class of the senate and was attached to the governors of the provinces and to other lesser posts. Members of the lower two orders were permitted to live anywhere within the Empire and were generally inactive senators. The majority of active members in the senate were the illustres, whose important offices were usually based in Constantinople and so were able to attend the senate frequently. By the end of the 5th century the two lower classes were completely excluded from sitting in the senate. During the reign of Justinian I the numbers of clarissimi were significantly increased which caused many officials to be promoted to the rank of spectabiles and this in turn caused there to be an increase of the numbers of illustres, which had previously been the elite class of the senate. As a result, a new order, the gloriosi, was created to accommodate the highest ranking senators. Being a Senator was generally a secondary career for most of the senate's members, who usually possessed important positions within the administrative machinery of the Empire.

== Powers and functions ==
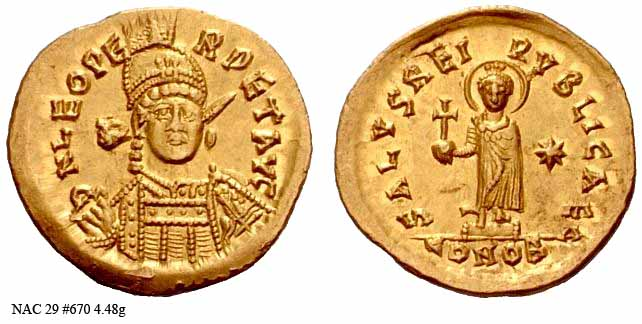
Solidus celebrating emperorship of Leo II. The emperor is coined as "Saviour of the Republic" — which the Empire continued to be in theory.

Whilst the powers of the senate were limited, it could pass resolutions (senatus consulta) which the Emperor might adopt and issue in the form of edicts. It could thus suggest Imperial legislation, and it acted from time to time as a consultative body. Some Imperial laws took the form of 'Orations to the senate', and were read aloud before the body. The Western Roman emperor Valentinian III in 446 formulated a legislative procedure which granted to the senate the right of co-operation, where any new law was to be discussed at a meeting between the senate and the council before being confirmed by the emperor. This procedure was included in Justinian's code although it is unclear whether it was fully adopted in the East. In addition the emperor would use the senate as a judicial court, and trials for high treason were sometimes referred to it. Ordinary crimes would also often be judged by a court consisting of the prefect of the city and five senators chosen by lot. The senate also maintained constitutional significance in that officially emperors were to be chosen by the military and the senate, although succession was almost always hereditary.

== Confrontations with the emperor ==
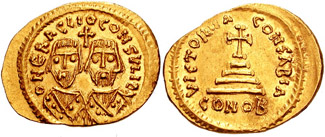
Gold solidus of the two Heraclii in consular robes, struck during their revolt against Phocas in 608

There were incidents when the senate confronted the emperor and attempted to assert authority on the basis of their constitutional importance regarding the succession of an Emperor. In 457 they offered to enthrone the master of soldiers, the Alan Aspar, but the tribune and senator Leo I, who was Aspar's subordinate, became emperor instead. In 532, some of the senators gave their support to the Nika rioters against Justinian I, who did not like or trust the wealthy senate. After 541, the senate lost many of its members due to a plague pandemic and during the ensuing economic turmoil, Justinian confiscated the wealth of many of the remaining senators. In 608 during the rule of Phocas, Heraclius the Elder and his son Heraclius were declared consuls with the backing of senate members in Carthage. Heraclius later was elected emperor. Previous emperor Phocas was deposed by the senate and arrested in a church by two senators.

When Emperor Heraclius died in 641, he left the Empire to be ruled by two of his sons: Constantine III from his first marriage with Eudokia and Heraklonas from his second marriage with Martina. Empress Martina demanded imperial power for herself (although most likely with intended favor for her son), and declared this in a grand ceremony held in the Hippodrome of Constantinople which was attended by the senate, other high officials and people of Constantinople. Opinion of the senate and the people being strongly against her, wanting Heraclius' sons to rule, Martina was forced to return to the Great Palace of Constantinople in defeat. However, Constantine died only four months later, leaving his half-brother Heraklonas as sole ruler, and rumours of Martina having assassinated him started to spread. Soon afterwards, a revolt led by general of the army named Valentinus began, and Heraklonas was forced to accept his young nephew Constans II, son of Constantine, as co-ruler. As a part of the negotiations, David brother of Heraklonas was also crowned as co-emperor. This, however, did not ease the discontent among the senate and the people, and soon the senate deposed Heraklonas. His nose was slit, Martina's tongue cut out and they were exiled to Rhodes. Constans II became sole emperor, under the regency of the senate.

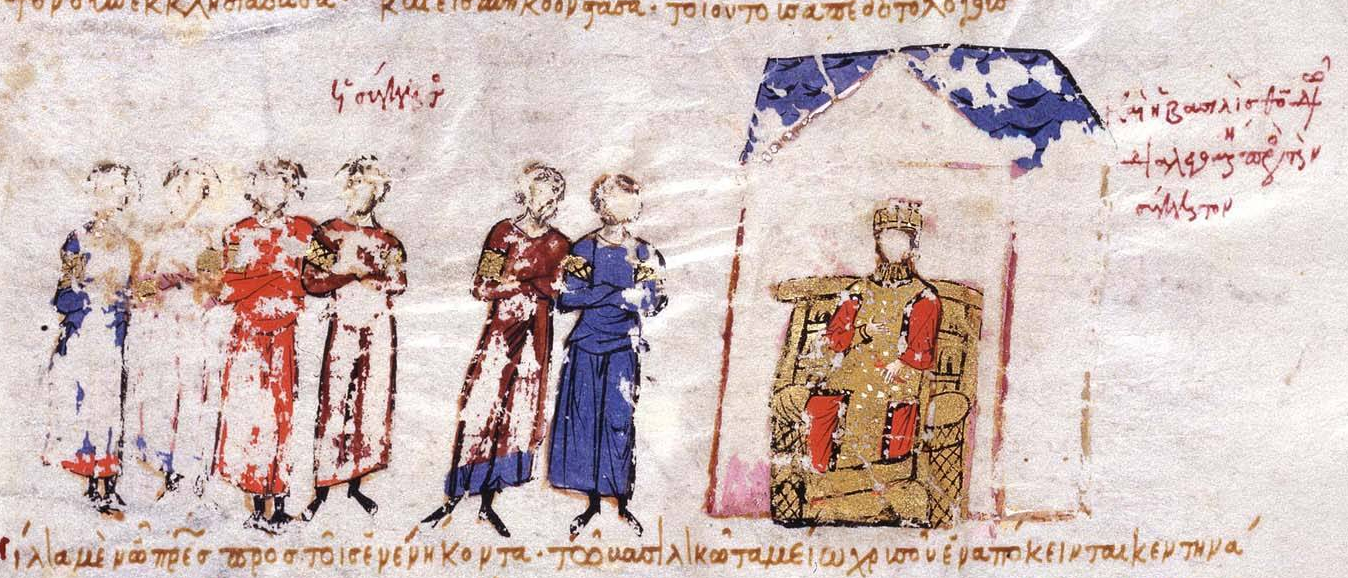
Depiction from the Madrid Skylitzes showing Empress Theodora conferring with the senate.

== Decline ==
The senate's power was gradually reduced over the course of history, although it still existed into the 13th century. From the seventh century on, it could be said that it was less of an institution than a class of dignitaries, as many of its remaining powers as a body were removed under legal reforms by the emperors Basil I and Leo VI.

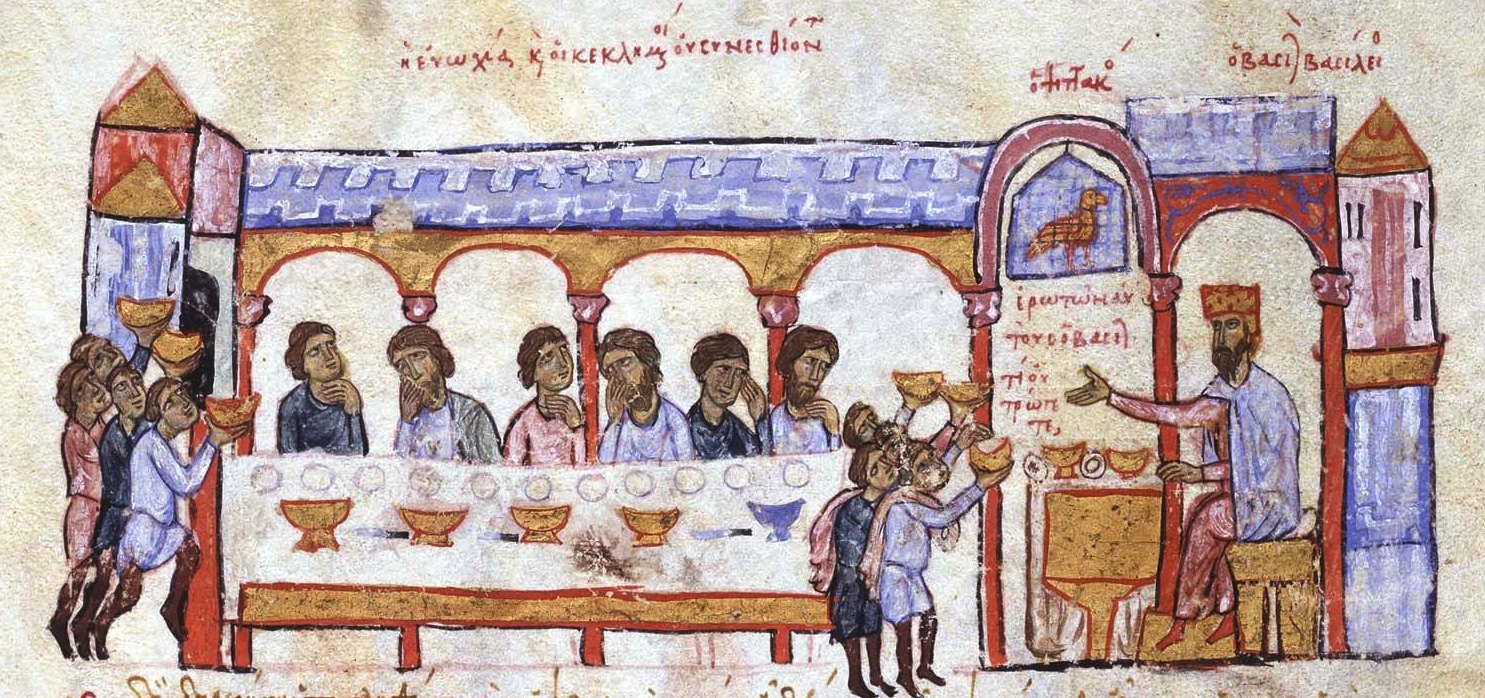
Emperor Basil I hosts a banquet for the senators.

The senate itself retained considerable prestige, especially in the 11th century when the "court party" came to power following the death of Basil II. With the final triumph of the military faction on the accession of Alexios I Komnenos, the senate began to fade into irrelevance and the title of senator could be bought from the emperor. In 1197 the senate was assembled—along with the clergy and guildsmen of the capital—to approve a special tax, the Alamanikon. The senators refused to be assessed for the tax, as it was contrary to custom, and the emperor was forced to tax the provinces and exempt the capital. The senate's last known act was to elect Nikolaos Kanabos as emperor in opposition to Isaac II and Alexius IV during the Fourth Crusade. Under the Palaeologus dynasty the title of senator survived for a time, but in the crises of the mid 14th century the ancient office, said to have been founded 2,000 years prior by the first Roman leader, Romulus, finally vanished for good.

== Senate houses ==
There were two senate houses in Constantinople. One, built by Constantine and restored by Justinian, was on the east side of the Augustaion, close to the Imperial Palace, at Magnaura, whilst the other was on the north side of the Forum of Constantine. The senate lost its houses in the 6th century and from then on assembled in the Great Palace of Constantinople.
