= Gregoria =

Byzantine empress in 641

- Augusta

Empress of the Byzantine Empire
- Tenure: 641
- Spouse: Constantine III
- Issue: Constans II; Theodosius
Names
- Gregoria
- Dynasty: Heraclian Dynasty
- Father: Niketas

Gregoria (Greek: Γρηγορία, romanized: Gregoría; fl. 641) was the Byzantine empress as the wife of Constantine III. She participated in the minority regency government of her son, Constans II, in 641–650.

== Life ==
She was a daughter of Niketas, a first cousin of Heraclius who had led an overland invasion of Roman Egypt in 608 in the revolt which elevated Heraclius to the throne. Niketas fought against the representatives of Phocas in Egypt and seems to have secured control of the province by 610.

On 5 October 610, Heraclius succeeded Phocas as the emperor. Niketas was rewarded with the social rank of patrician and the military position of Comes Excubitorum, commander of the Excubitors. He seems to have remained in control of Egypt and took part in the defense against the invasion of Khosrau II of the Sassanid Empire. Egypt was lost to Khosrau in 618 but Niketas survived. Niketas was then appointed Exarch of the Exarchate of Africa. His term started in 619 and lasted to his death in 628/629.

Her paternal grandfather was Gregorius, brother to Heraclius the Elder. Heraclius had been appointed Exarch of Africa by Maurice and lived to support the revolt of his son. But not to its conclusion. Gregorius seems to have served under the command of his brother but the extent of his role is unknown.

=== Empress ===
Gregoria was betrothed to her second cousin Constantine III, only known son of Heraclius and his first wife Eudokia. Constantine was crowned co-emperor by his father on 22 January 613.

Their marriage took place in 629/630. The groom was about seventeen years old. Gregoria was likely of equivalent age. She had arrived to Constantinople from the Western Pentapolis in Cyrenaica. Since Cyrenaica was in the territory of her father Niketas, Gregoria is assumed to have been brought up under his supervision instead of that of her father-in-law. She was the junior Empress with Martina as the senior one.

Gregoria and her husband had at least two sons. Constans II was born on 7 November 630. According to Theophanes, a second son was named Theodosius. He was executed by Constans in 659/660.

Heraclius died on 11 February 641. Constantine III became senior emperor with his paternal half-brother Heraklonas as his co-ruler. Of course, Heraclius' will emphasized that his two sons should rule jointly and equally, without one following the other, and govern by mutual agreement. He also included his wife Martina in the partnership, stressing that, as their mother and a rightful empress, she should be respected and have a voice in state affairs. Constantine died of tuberculosis between April and May of the same year. A revolt in favor of Constans resulted in the deposition of Heraklonas by September. Her son was a minor until 650, and Gregoria was most likely regent during his minority, but her acts as regent is not mentioned in Byzantine sources. However, she maintained control of the palace and custody of emperor, and consulted with Valentinus, the regent, on important matters.

Royal titles
| Preceded by Martina | Byzantine Empress consort 641 | Succeeded by Fausta |
