= Byzantine Empire under the Heraclian dynasty =

Period of Byzantine history from 610 to 711

Byzantine Empire Βασιλεία Ῥωμαίων (Ancient Greek) Imperium Romanum (Latin)
- 610–711
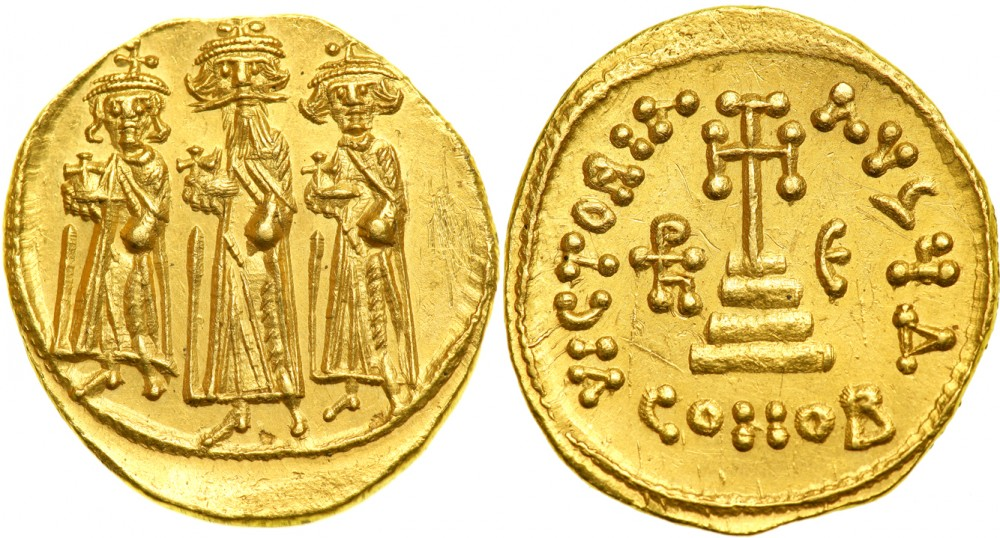
- Emblem of the Heraclian dynasty depicted on a coin

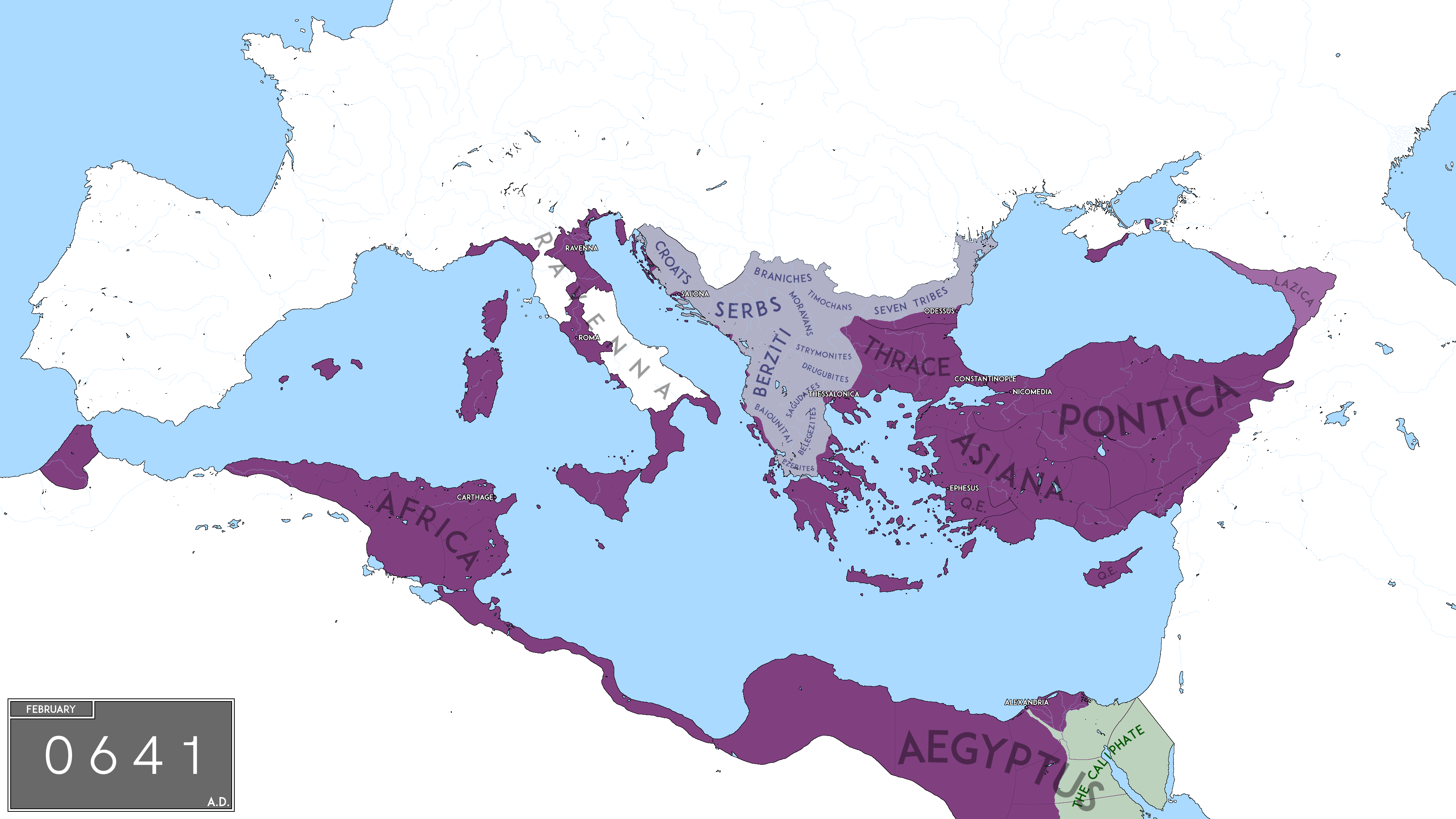
- The Byzantine Empire during the reign of Heraclius
- Capital: Constantinople
- Common languages: Greek; Latin
- Government: Monarchy
- Emperor
  - 610–641: Heraclius
  - 641: Constantine III
  - 641: Heraclonas
  - 641–668: Constans II
  - 668–685: Constantine IV
  - 685–695, 705–711: Justinian II
- Historical era: Late Antiquity to Early Middle Ages
  - Accession of Heraclius: 5 October 610 610
  - Death of Justinian II: 11 December 711 711
Preceded by
Byzantine Empire under the Justinian dynasty
Succeeded by
Twenty Years' Anarchy
First Bulgarian Empire
Umayyad Caliphate

The Byzantine Empire was ruled by emperors of the Heraclian dynasty from 610 to 711 AD. The Heraclian period encompassed the Byzantine–Sasanian War of 602–628, the Early Muslim conquests, and major political, military, religious, and administrative changes that transformed the Roman Empire in the eastern Mediterranean. The reign of Heraclius began during a period of severe crisis, when the Empire was at war with the Sasanian Empire and faced political instability and military pressure on several fronts. Heraclius is generally considered to have probably been of Armenian descent, although the origins of his family remain debated and some sources associate his family with Cappadocia. At the beginning of the dynasty, the Empire retained much of the political, institutional, and cultural heritage of the Roman state of Late Antiquity. During the seventh century, however, prolonged warfare, territorial losses, economic disruption, demographic changes, and internal religious controversies contributed to a profound transformation of the Empire.

By the end of the Heraclian period, the Empire had lost most of its territories outside Asia Minor, the Balkans, and a number of remaining possessions in the Mediterranean. Its political and military institutions had adapted to the conditions of the seventh century, while Greek had increasingly replaced Latin as the dominant language of administration and public life. The Empire was increasingly characterized by a more compact territorial core and a society shaped by prolonged warfare with the Caliphate. These developments contributed to the emergence of the medieval Byzantine state, although its rulers and inhabitants continued to identify themselves as Romans. The period ended with the second deposition of Justinian II in 711 and was followed by the period of political instability known as the Twenty Years' Anarchy.

The Heraclian dynasty was named after the emperor Heraclius, who, together with his father Heraclius the Elder, the Exarch of Africa, led a revolt against the emperor Phocas in 608. In 610, Heraclius sailed from Carthage to Constantinople, overthrew Phocas, and became emperor. At the time of his accession, the Empire was engaged in the Byzantine–Sasanian War of 602–628. The Sasanian armies subsequently captured large parts of the Empire's eastern territories, as well as Egypt and parts of Anatolia. After a series of military campaigns, Heraclius defeated the Sasanian forces and brought the war to an end in 628. The Empire temporarily recovered its eastern territories, but these gains were soon threatened by the rapid expansion of the Early Muslim conquests from the Arabian Peninsula.

Heraclius's successors struggled to contain the expanding Muslim caliphates. The Levant, Egypt, and much of North Africa were lost during the seventh century, while an Arab army and fleet attacked Constantinople during the Siege of Constantinople (674–678). Nevertheless, the Empire survived and gradually adapted to its reduced territory. The development of the theme system helped organize the military and administrative resources of the imperial heartland, particularly in Asia Minor, although the chronology and nature of the system's early development remain debated among historians. Under Constans II and Constantine IV, the Empire continued to resist Arab expansion while also confronting threats in the Balkans. Under Justinian II, Byzantine military activity in the East continued, while the Empire also became increasingly involved in conflicts with the Bulgars.

The latter part of the seventh century also saw the emergence of a major new power in the Balkans. In 680–681, the Byzantines were defeated by the Bulgars under Asparukh, and the First Bulgarian Empire was established south of the Danube. The Byzantine Empire subsequently recognized the Bulgarian state, which became an important political and military power in the Balkans. The Heraclian period ended in 711, when Justinian II was overthrown and killed during a revolt led by Philippikos Bardanes. His death brought the Heraclian dynasty to an end and ushered in a period of political instability known as the Twenty Years' Anarchy.

== Background ==
The Byzantine Empire after Heraclius reconquered the Eastern Provinces from the Sassanids.

Ever since the fall of the Western Roman Empire, the Eastern Roman Empire continued to see Western Europe as rightfully Imperial territory. However, only Justinian I attempted to enforce this claim with military might. Temporary success in the West was achieved at the cost of Persian dominance in the East, where the Byzantines were forced to pay tribute to avert war.

However, after Justinian's death, much of newly recovered Italy fell to the Lombards by 610, and the Visigoths soon reduced the imperial holdings in Spain by 624-625. At the same time, wars with the Persian Empire brought no conclusive victory. In 591 however, the long war was ended with a treaty favorable to Byzantium, which gained Armenia. Thus, after the death of Tiberius II, Maurice sought to restore the prestige of the Empire.

Even though the Empire had gained smaller successes over the Slavs and Avars in pitched battles across the Danube, both enthusiasm for the army and faith in the government had lessened considerably. Unrest had reared its head in Byzantine cities as social and religious differences manifested themselves into Blue and Green factions that fought each other in the streets. The final blow to the government was a decision to cut the pay of its army in response to financial strains. The combined effect of an army revolt led by a junior officer named Phocas and major uprisings by the Greens and Blues forced Maurice to abdicate. The Senate approved Phocas as the new Emperor and Maurice, the last emperor of the Justinian dynasty, was murdered along with his four sons.

The Persian King Khosrau II responded by launching an assault on the Empire, ostensibly to avenge Maurice, who had earlier helped him to regain his throne. Phocas was already alienating his supporters with his repressive rule (introducing torture on a large scale), and the Persians were able to capture Syria and Mesopotamia by 607. By 608, the Persians were camped outside Chalcedon, within sight of the imperial capital of Constantinople, while Anatolia was ravaged by Persian raids. Making matters worse was the advance of the Avars and Slavic tribes heading south across the Danube and into Imperial territory.

While the Persians were making headway in their conquest of the eastern provinces, Phocas chose to divide his subjects rather than unite them against the threat of the Persians. Perhaps seeing his defeats as divine retribution, Phocas initiated a savage and bloody campaign to forcibly convert the Jews to Christianity. Persecutions and alienation of the Jews, a frontline people in the war against the Persians helped drive them into aiding the Persian conquerors. As Jews and Christians began tearing each other apart, some fled the butchery into Persian territory. Meanwhile, it appears that the disasters befalling the Empire led the Emperor into a state of paranoia—although it must be said that there were numerous plots against his rule and execution followed execution. Among those individuals who were executed was the former empress Constantina and her three daughters.

== Heraclius ==
=== Fall of Phocas ===
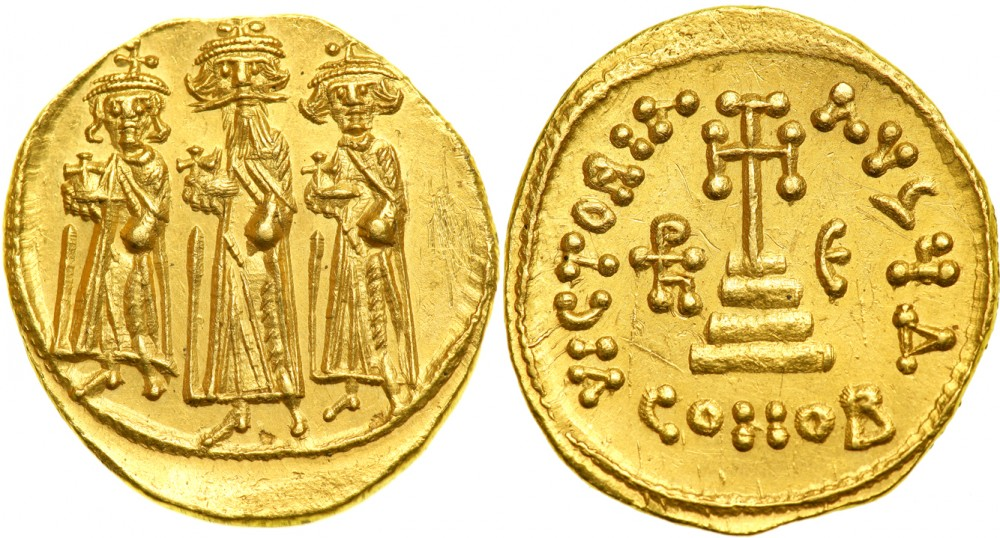
Solidus of Heraclius' reign, showing his son Constantine III as co-emperor.

Due to the overwhelming crisis facing the Empire that had pitched it into chaos, Heraclius the Elder now attempted to seize power from Phocas in an effort to restore stability. As the Empire was led into anarchy, the Exarchate of Africa remained relatively out of reach of Persian conquest. Far from the incompetent Imperial authority of the time, Heraclius, the Exarch of Carthage, with his brother Gregoras, began building up his forces to assault Constantinople. After cutting off the grain supply to the capital from his territory, Heraclius led a substantial army and a fleet in 608 to restore order in the Empire. Heraclius gave the command of the army to Gregoras' son, Nicetas, whilst command of the fleet went to Heraclius' son, Heraclius the Younger. Nicetas took part of the fleet and his forces to Egypt, seizing Alexandria towards the end of 608. Meanwhile, Heraclius the Younger headed to Thessalonica, from where, after receiving more supplies and troops, he sailed for Constantinople. He reached his destination on 3 October 610, where he was unopposed as he landed off the shores of Constantinople, citizens greeting him as their deliverer.

When Phocas was delivered to Heraclius, an interesting conversation took place:

Heraclius: "Is it thus that you have governed the Empire?"
Phocas: "Will you govern it better?"

The reign of Phocas officially ended in his execution and the crowning of Heraclius by the Patriarch of Constantinople two days later on 5 October. A statue of Phocas that rested in the Hippodrome was pulled down and set aflame, along with the colors of the Blues that supported Phocas.

=== Early failures ===
After having married his wife in an elaborate ceremony and crowned by the Patriarch, the 36-year-old Heraclius set out to perform his work as Emperor. The early portion of his reign yielded results reminiscent of Phocas' reign with respect to trouble in the Balkans. The Avars and Slavs poured through the western Adriatic, as well as through the southern and eastern portions of the Aegean area. Their large forces and strategic movement into Dalmatia engulfed several Byzantine cities, namely Singidunum (Belgrade), Viminacium (Kostolac), Naissus (Niš), Sardica (Sofia), and destroyed Salona in 614. However, numerous attempts to take the city of Thessalonica by the Slavs and Avars ended in failure, allowing the Empire to hold onto a vital city in the region.

In 613, the Byzantine army suffered a defeat at Antioch, allowing the Persians to move freely and effectively in all directions. This rapid advance caused the cities of Damascus and Tarsus to fall, along with Armenia. More seriously, however, was the loss of Jerusalem, which was besieged and captured by the Persians in three weeks. Countless churches in the city (including the Holy Sepulchre) were burnt and numerous relics, including the True Cross, the Holy Lance and the Holy Sponge, present at the time of Jesus Christ's death, were now in Ctesiphon, the Persian capital. The Persians remained poised outside of Chalcedon, not too far from the capital, and the province of Syria was in total chaos.

Despite Nicetas' earlier efforts, Egypt was also conquered, resulting in a significant loss in manpower, food supplies and revenue. However, the situation was not entirely hopeless. Constantinople's walls were as powerful and well-defended as ever, and Heraclius still had a large, better-trained, and better-armed fleet than any of his "barbarian" opponents (especially the Slavs and Avars). The Persians had no vessels in the Bosporus, and thus unable to effectively besiege the city.

=== Byzantine counter offensive ===
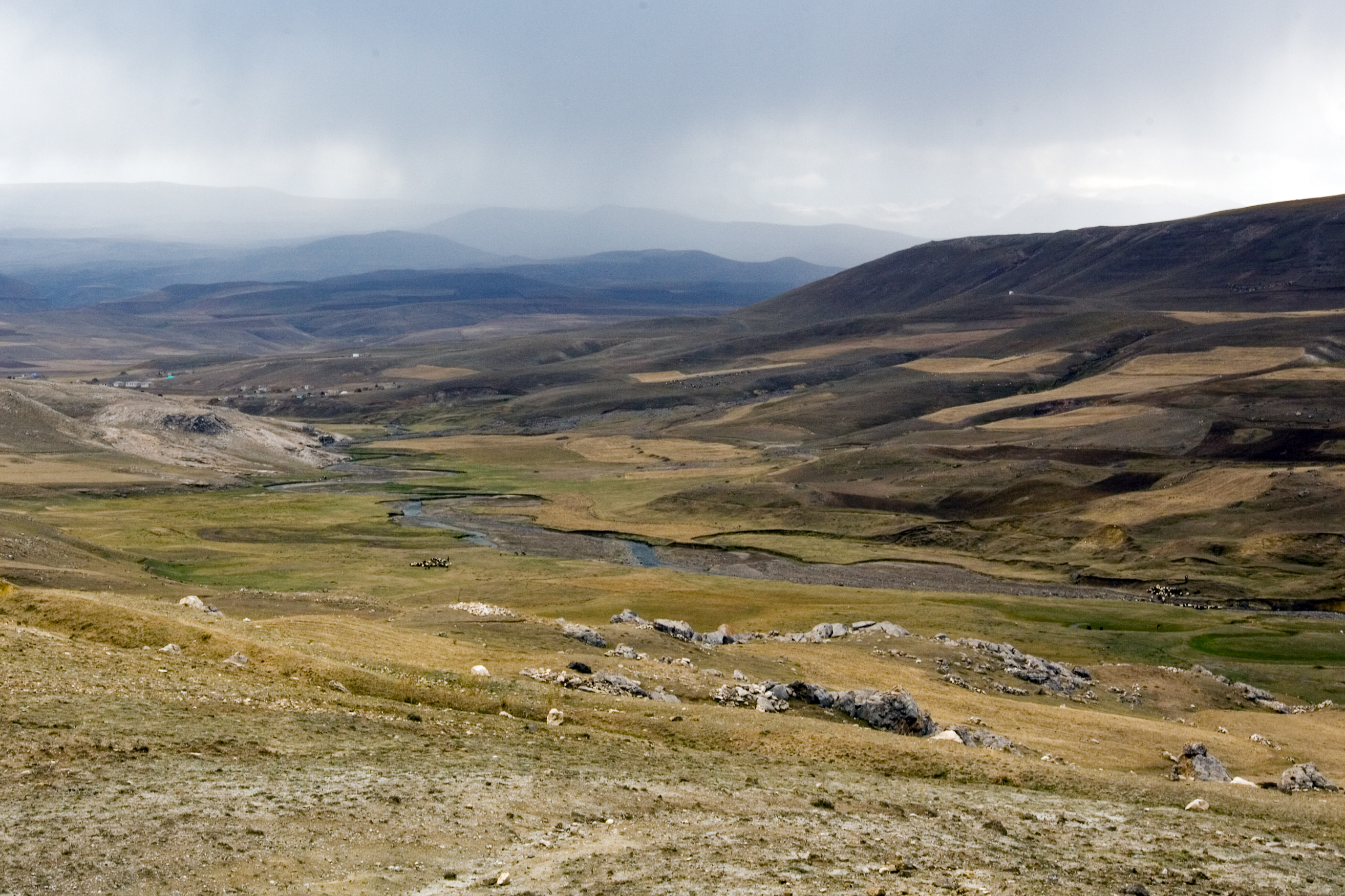
The Arsanias River, now known as the Murat River in modern Turkey.

To recover from key-battles that were lost to the Persians, Heraclius went about a reconstruction plan of the military, financing it by fining those accused of corruption, increasing taxes, and debasing the currency to pay more soldiers and forced loans. The Patriarch of Constantinople, Sergius, placed the finances of the Church into the hands of the State, a surprising but well-needed sacrifice. Heraclius now aimed to eliminate one of his dangerous threats, the Sassanid Empire. The Persians had conquered extensive amounts of territory in Anatolia, Mesopotamia, the Levant, and North Africa, but had yet to consolidate their hold on it. Heraclius decided to negotiate a peace with the Avars and Slavs by paying them a large amount of tribute so that he could freely move his armies from Europe to Asia in order to launch counter-offensives against the Persians. With his Eastern opponents still outside Chalcedon, in the spring of 622 Heraclius took the field. He sailed his newly created army down the Ionian coast and landed at Issus, the exact site where Alexander the Great had decisively defeated the Achaemenid Empire some 1,000 years prior. At Issus, Heraclius oversaw the extensive training of his men. In the autumn of that year, he marched his army northwards and encountered a Persian force in the Cappadocian highlands. Despite having no military experience in leading an army in the field, the Byzantine Emperor decisively routed the forces of the experienced Persian General Shahrbaraz, boosting his army's morale and recovering large amounts of territory.

In early 623, Heraclius led his forces through Armenia and modern-day Azerbaijan. By moving towards Armenia, this forced the Persians to move from their positions in Asia Minor and to follow the army "like a dog on a chain". It was in Armenia that the Byzantine army once again found success against the Persian general Shahrbaraz, winning a large victory. Events in the capital forced Heraclius and his army to return to Constantinople, as the Avar Khan was threatening action on the city. Heraclius was forced to increase the tribute being paid to the Avars, even having to go as far as sending hostages to the Khan to ensure payment. This once again shored up his rearguard, allowing him to re-engage the Persian army in March 623, as the Persian king Chosroes II had become ever more belligerent in his attitude, spurning a truce. On the way to Persia, the Byzantine army pillaged and looted extensively, including the destruction of the Persian palace at Ganzak. Burning numerous cities of his opponents, Heraclius made a risky decision and led his troops deep within the heartland of the Sassanid Empire to Ctesiphon, the Persian capital. However, Shahrbaraz began cutting off Heraclius' supply lines, forcing the latter to withdraw to the western shore of the Caspian Sea. There, his second wife and niece (Martina) safely delivered a child, although the marriage was seen by many as incestuous.

In 624, Heraclius led another campaign towards Lake Van. However, the victory that he sought would not come to him until the following year. Leading his army through Ararat down the Arsanias River for some 200 miles (320 km) to capture the cities of Martyropolis and Amida, Heraclius finally encountered a Persian army north of the town of Adana after marching 70 miles (113 km) through Mesopotamia. Initially, the battle went well for the Persians, as they obliterated the vanguard of the Byzantine army. However, Heraclius then seized the initiative by launching a seemingly suicidal charge across the River Euphrates, thus turning the tide of the battle. Shahrbaraz expressed his admiration at Heraclius to a renegade Greek:

See your Emperor! He fears these arrows and spears no more than would an anvil!

— Shahr-Baraz,

=== Siege of Constantinople ===
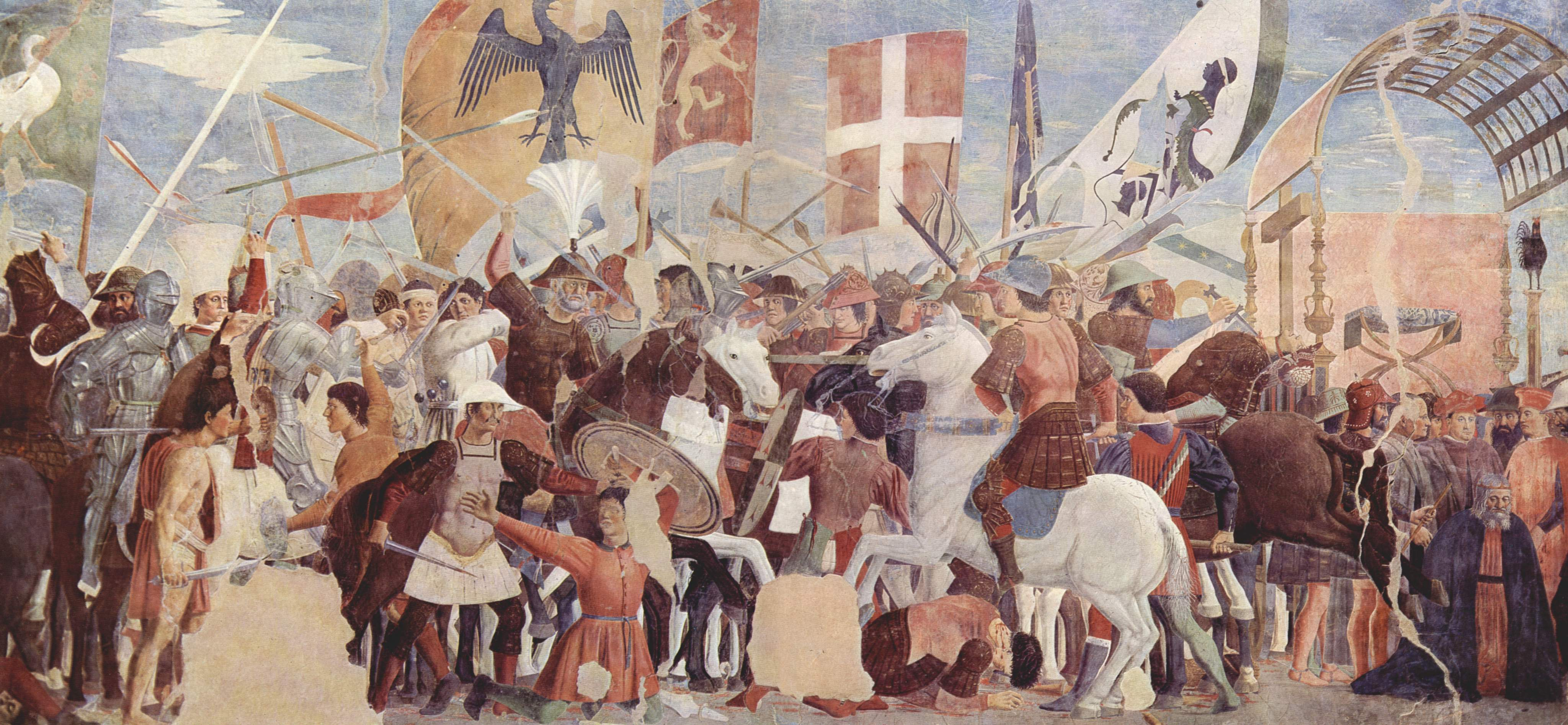
Battle between Heraclius and the Persians. Fresco by Piero della Francesca, c. 1452

Victory belonged to the Byzantines, and now, the honours of the war were even. However, the Persian threat was not yet diminished. The long-awaited assault on Constantinople was finally beginning to materialize—the Avars began moving siege equipment towards the Capital (the siege began on June 29, 626) whilst Shahrbaraz was ordered by King Khosrau II to send his army to Chalcedon and link up with the Avars. Khosrau began conscripting able-bodied men into a new army, raising a crack force of approximately 50,000 men. Heraclius, it seems, was not only being outmaneuvered, but being outmaneuvered by several larger armies. However, Heraclius attempted to match the Persians by duplicating their strategy and dividing his forces into three separate contingents. One army would defend the capital, whilst another, under the command of the Emperor's brother Theodore, would face the 50,000 conscripts in Mesopotamia who were commanded by the Persian General Shahin. Meanwhile, the third, which would be personally commanded by the Emperor, would march through Armenia and the Caucasus and into Persia, which he believed would have been stripped of most of the able-bodied men due to Khosrau's conscription. This would allow his forces to easily advance into the heartland of Persia.

Theodore's contingent fared well against Shahin in Mesopotamia, inflicting a crushing defeat on the Persians. During this battle, at Constantinople, the city was well defended with a force of some 12,000 cavalry (presumably dismounted), supported by the entire city's population. Indeed, the efforts of the Patriarch Sergius in whipping up the population into a religious and patriotic frenzy cannot be overlooked. When the Byzantine fleet annihilated a Persian and an Avar fleet in two separate ambushes, the besiegers appeared to have withdrawn in panic. And when word of Theodore's victory in Mesopotamia came, it was concluded by the besiegers that Byzantium was now under the protection of the Romans' Christian God.

=== Triumph ===
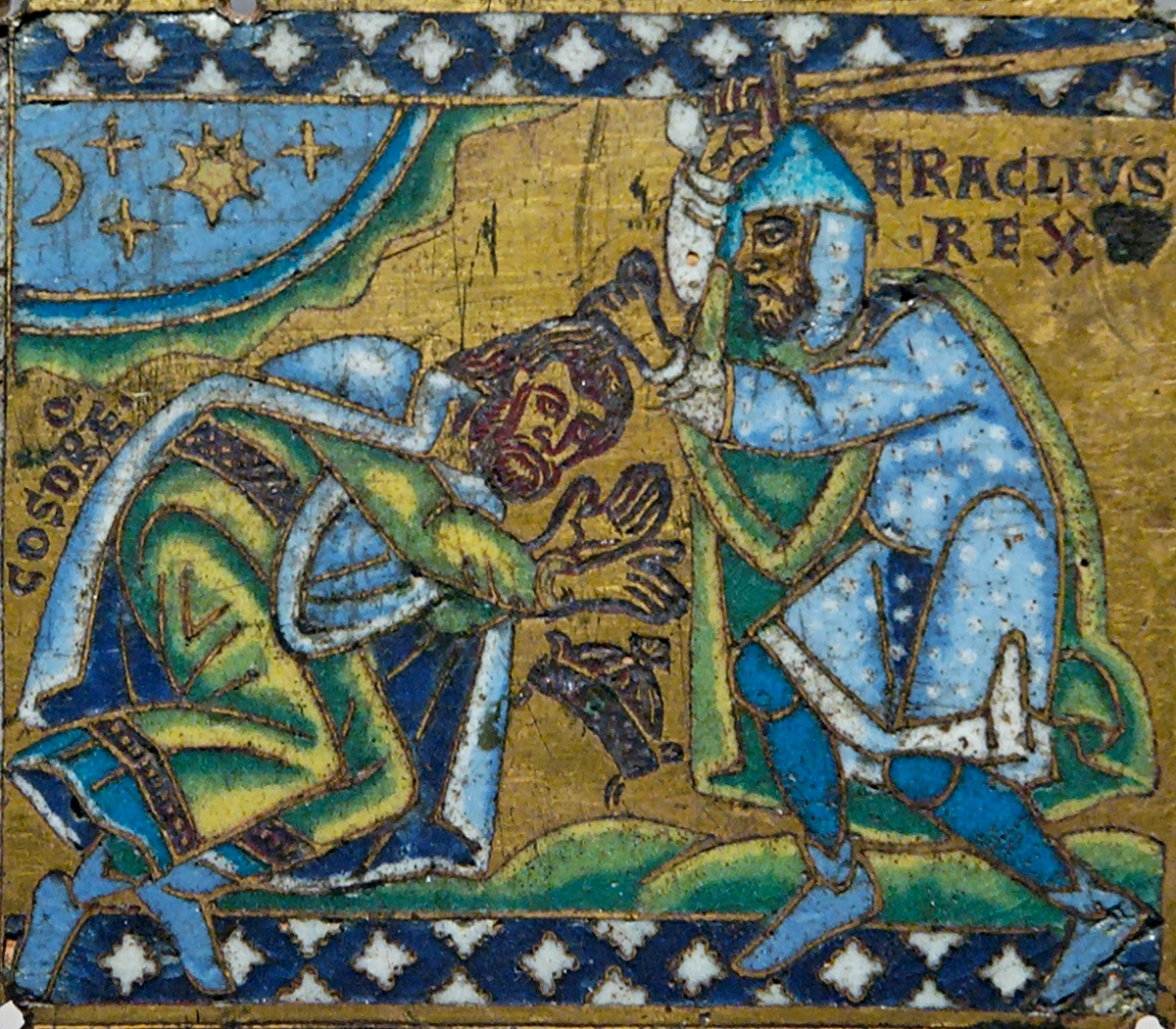
Heraclius overcoming Khosrau II; plaque from a cross (Champlevé enamel over gilt copper, 1160–1170, Paris, Louvre)

For Heraclius, 626 was a year of little action—it appears that in an attempt to bolster his forces, he promised the hand of his daughter Epiphania to the Khan of the Western Turkic Khaganate, Ziebel. Impressed by the offer, the Khan fielded some 40,000 troops on the Byzantine side. However, the Khan died just two years later, in 628. Nonetheless, Byzantium made good use of the boost in troops when Heraclius marched into Mesopotamia the following year. His objective was clear: to destroy the Persians' army and march to Ctesiphon, doing what no Roman Emperor had done in nearly 300 years (since the days of Julian the Apostate): . His army marched cautiously into this hostile terrain. It was known to Heraclius that a Persian force was close and an ambush was always a possibility. Meanwhile, Rhahzadh, the new Persian commander, was also not keen to face Heraclius until his army was ready for a pitched battle.

After spending a greater part of 627 in Mesopotamia, Heraclius finally encountered the Persian army close to the ruins of the city of Ninevah. For eleven hours, the Byzantines and the Persians fought each other continuously. In the thick of the fighting Razates issued a challenge to Heraclius, who accepted. Despite being wounded, Heraclius managed to decapitate Razates. When the sun finally began to set, the Persians had been defeated and both armies rested.

Heraclius later moved on to the Great Palace of Dastagird only to discover that Khosrau II had fled his Palace. In a fit of rage, Heraclius ordered that everything be burnt to the ground. Moving on, he soon found that Khosrau no longer commanded the loyalty of his subjects—as they refused to rally to defend Ctesiphon. Heraclius waited a week or two before marching his army back. Khosrau's son Siroes took power as Kavadh II and had his father shot to death with arrows. Later, the formation of a peace treaty favourable to the Byzantines led to the restoration of the pre-war boundaries. As an added bonus, all captives and Christian relics that had been captured by the Persians were returned. Thus, it was at the head of the True Cross that Heraclius entered the Capital on September 14, 628 triumphant. Leading a procession which included four elephants, the True Cross was placed high atop the altar of the Hagia Sophia.

By this time, it was generally expected by the Byzantine populace that the Emperor would lead Byzantium into a new age of glory. However, all of Heraclius' achievements would come to naught, when, in 633, the Byzantine–Arab Wars began.

=== Decline ===
The threat of the Arabs from Arabia was overlooked by both Persia and Byzantium for several reasons—most compelling of all were the wars between the two powers, and the lack of communication across the desert expanse. Nonetheless, efforts were conducted, sometimes cooperatively, by the Byzantines and the Persians to stop the advance of the Arabs.

On 8 June 632, the Islamic Prophet Muhammad died of a fever. However, the religion he left behind would transform the Middle East. In 633, the armies of Islam marched out of Arabia, their goal to spread the word of the prophet. In 634, the Arabs defeated a Byzantine force sent into Syria and captured Damascus. The arrival of another large Byzantine army outside Antioch forced the Arabs to retreat. The Byzantines advanced in May 636. However, a sandstorm blew on 20 August 636 against the Byzantines and when the Arabs charged against them they were utterly annihilated:

The Battle fought at Yarmuk was of the fiercest and bloodiest kind ... the Romans and their followers tied themselves to each other by chains, so that no one might set his hope to flight. By Allah's help some 70,000 of them were put to death and their remnants took to flight ...

— Al-Baladhuri,

Jerusalem surrendered to the Arabs in 637, following a stout resistance; in 638, the Caliph Omar rode into the city. Heraclius stopped by Jerusalem to recover the True Cross whilst it was under siege. In his old age he was becoming increasingly unstable in his rule. Once the commander of his father's fleet, he developed a phobia of the sea, and refused to cross the Bosporus to the capital. Only when several boats were tied along the length of the strait with shrubs placed along to hide the water did he ride across, "as if by land" as a contemporary put it.

Because of the Byzantine–Sasanian War of 602–628 both Byzantines and Persians exhausted themselves and made them vulnerable for the expansion of the Caliphate.

The Arab invasions and loss of territory was not all that bore heavily upon the Emperor's mind. It was rumoured that the incestuous marriage to his niece had incurred the wrath of God—of the nine children that he had, four had died in infancy, one had a twisted neck and one was deaf and dumb. Furthermore, it appears that the Empire was not even considering the Arab threat as a danger. The religious controversies once again emerged when the Patriarch of Constantinople Sergius proposed monothelitism as a compromise to the Chalcedonian Christians and the Monophysites. Heraclius agreed to the proposal. However, it received much criticism from both sides of the theological debate of Christ's true nature. When Sophronius, a major critic of monothelitism was elected as Patriarch of Jerusalem, the Empire began once again to tear itself apart. To some in the Empire the Arabs' promise of religious freedom seemed preferable to the other, seemingly blasphemous politically motivated proposals. At his death bed on 11 February 641, Heraclius died whispering that he had lied; he was reluctant to support monothelitism. It appears that unity was all that he sought.

The Byzantine Empire after the Arabs conquered the provinces of Syria and Egypt. At the same time the Slavs laid pressure and settled in the Balkan.

Before his death Heraclius was "persuaded" by his wife Martina to crown her son Heraclonas (Flavius Heraclius) co-heir to the throne of the Empire with Constantine, the son of Heraclius' first wife Eudocia—all the meanwhile ignoring the numerous Byzantines who saw her as the reason for Byzantium's recent misfortunes. Her ambitions for power ensured that Byzantium would continue to succumb to disorder.

=== Assessment of his rule ===
Heraclius's reign was one of mixed fortunes. He started his reign by losing the eastern provinces, brought it to its peak by retaking them against all odds, and ended it by losing them again. It was Heraclius who first withdrew the eastern field armies into Anatolia, sowing the seeds of the Theme system, and it was he who, through depopulation and the razing of fortifications, stabilized the Anatolian frontier, which would remain largely unchanged for the next 350 years.

By Heraclius's late reign, proper Latin had been reduced to a military and ceremonial role outside of the Exarchates, replaced by Greek as the language of court and high administration. This was the result of natural demographic shifts, and there was never an official change from language one to the other, as is sometimes claimed. He was also the first emperor to, after defeating the Persians, officially adopt the title of Basileus, "King" in Greek, though the title had been used unofficially for centuries; Procopius used the title frequently, for example. There is no indication, as is, again, sometimes claimed, that Basileus became Heraclius's "primary" title, and other prominent Imperial titles since ancient/Latin era of the Empire, such as Augustus and Imperator, remained in varying degrees of use for the remainder of the empire's lifetime.

Had Heraclius lived only until 629, he might have been remembered for his successful military reorganization and impressive handling of the last Persian war, which saw hope and victory snatched from the jaws of defeat. However, his lengthy life meant that the Byzantines remembered him for his religious controversies, failures against the Arabs, and incestuous marriage to his niece, which many believed to have brought divine retribution upon the entire Empire.

After his death, Heraclius' corpse remained unburied for three days, guarded by his soldiers until it was laid to rest in the Church of the Holy Apostles within a sarcophagus of white onyx next to the founder of his Empire, Constantine I.

== The Theme system ==
The establishment of the themes in the Byzantine Empire

The army of the Empire that Heraclius worked so hard to improve eventually was reorganized in Asia Minor into four Themes, in what is now known as the Theme system. This system was originally credited by Byzantine historians like George Ostrogorsky to Heraclius. He provides Theophanes as a source, quoting the expression "the district of the themes" in the year 622, showing the themes had begun to be created at this time. However, there is evidence presented by some modern historians that it could possibly be credited to Constans II, and yet others leave the door open that Heraclius could possibly have done so in the late 630s in Cilicia. In any case, the debate over exactly when the thematic system originated continues on.

The administrative regions created from this system were to be governed by a strategos, a military governor. The aim of these Themes was to maximize military potential—many able-bodied men and their families were settled in these four themes and given land for farming. In return for land, these men were to provide the Empire with loyal soldiers, and so began the Thematic armies of the Byzantine Empire that would prove to be reliable, though not unbeatable fighting force for centuries to come. Nonetheless, a native, well-trained army loyal to the state would serve the Empire far more than ill-disciplined mercenaries, whose loyalty to coin could be manipulated and turned against the state itself, as had been exemplified during the Fall of the Western Roman Empire.

== Constans II ==
=== Death of Heraclius ===
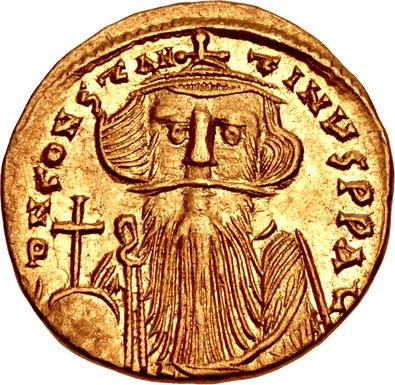
Solidus of Constans II, the inscription reads "Constantinus" as that was his actual name.

Heraclius' inability to rule the Empire as his death neared did Byzantium no favors. After Heraclius' death in February 641, the former Empress Martina declared herself, her son, Heraclonas, and her stepson, Constantine III Heraclius, co-emperors. However, the citizens of Constantinople refused to accept this. And so, when Constantine III died sometime in May 641 (considered by the majority of the Byzantines to have been done by Martina's hand), Heraclonas and his mother were deposed the following summer. Heraclonas' nose was slit and Martina's tongue was wrenched out. These acts ensured that Heraclonas could never become Basileus (Emperor) – the physical deformation would have made it impossible. However, as suspects of committing regicide, their exile to the island of Rhodes was a light punishment.

With Constantine dead, the populace of Constantinople turned to his 11-year-old son (also known as Heraclius), who was crowned emperor and changed his name to Constantine. However, he later became known by the nickname "Constans", thus becoming Constans II.

=== Wars with the Arabs ===
Constans II had inherited from his grandfather Heraclius the war with the Arabs, who were bent on conquering the Byzantine Empire and spreading the word of the Islamic Prophet Muhammad. Upon his ascension, there was little time to implement a defence for Egypt—and when the province fell in 642, Constans II could hardly be blamed.

The loss of Egypt and the Levant was catastrophic—along with the manpower from these regions, the substantial supply of food from Egypt was now but a thing of the past. Food shortages were now added to an increasing list of problems that the Emperor was facing. And to make matters worse for the Byzantines, the Arab armies gave no respite—by 647 the Exarchate of Carthage had been decisively defeated — another costly defeat as Africa was the Empire's main source of grain, aside from already lost Egypt. The list of defeats would continue to grow, as in 644, the Arabs began building a sizable fleet to take on the centuries of Greco-Roman naval dominance. In 657, the Arab fleet was sent to raid the Byzantine island of Cyprus—the island was barely defended, and the Arabs sacked the chief city of Constantia, destroyed its harbor installations, and ravaged the countryside. In 654, the Muslim fleet continued unopposed to the island of Rhodes. After the island fell, Constans II suffered another humiliating defeat at the Battle of the Masts, when he sent his fleet to engage the Arabs off Lycia. During the engagement, Constans II, fearing the possibility of being captured, exchanged clothing with another man so that he could escape without being identified. Though never captured, the experience was rather embarrassing for the so-called "King of Kings".

==== Respite ====
By this point, the Arabs appeared to the Romans as invincible, and thus, could only hinder themselves. Fortunately for Byzantium, the Arabs began to do just that. The Caliph Uthman ibn Affan was assassinated in Medina. As a result, Ali, the Islamic Prophet Muhammed's son-in law was elected as his successor. However, Muawiya, the governor of Syria who led the Arab fleet against Byzantium, was proclaimed Caliph in Syria, as well. Only when Ali was assassinated in 661 did the civil strife end, much to Byzantium's disappointment.

=== Attempts to deal with religious controversies ===
Clearly, Byzantium stood no chance whatsoever of defending herself against her opponents when bishops tore the Empire over theological debates. Constans II saw this and it seems that he had enough of it. In 648, Constans still only 18 years of age, declared an edict that no one would raise the monothelitism versus Chalcedon controversy under the pain of banishment, following an excommunication by the Pope Theodore I to the Patriarch of Constantinople Pyrrhus. When Theodore's successor, Martin I once again added fuel to the fire by summoning a council in condemnation of Monethelitism in October 648, he was arrested, brought to the capital and badly mistreated as a common criminal. In prison it is said that his mistreatment was "such that blood was on the floor." Finally, after being accused of treason and regicide he was banished to the Crimea. Such was the frustration of the Emperor.

=== To the West ===
Constans II decided to turn his attention to the West in the hope of achieving better luck. Whilst the Saracens were establishing themselves in former Byzantine territory, the Avars and Bulgars still remained along the Danube river, as did the Slavs, whose annual payment to the Empire was falling short. Constans II then decided to move his capital to Syracuse in Sicily in 662. Some say that this was to escape horrible visions of his brother whom he had murdered two years past. His stay in Italy and Sicily can only be imagined as unpleasant for the locals. Everything of any value in Rome was requisitioned by the Byzantine army—even copper from the rooftops. It was to many people's relief that Constans II was murdered while bathing by his Greek servant on 15 July 668.

Constans II left the Empire in a worse state than he had found it. The Byzantine-Arab wars became increasingly one-sided and the immense resources of the Caliphate meant that any reconquest was now remotely unlikely — and more so whilst disunity through dissatisfied peasants and restless Bishops lingered on.

=== Tang-dynasty China ===
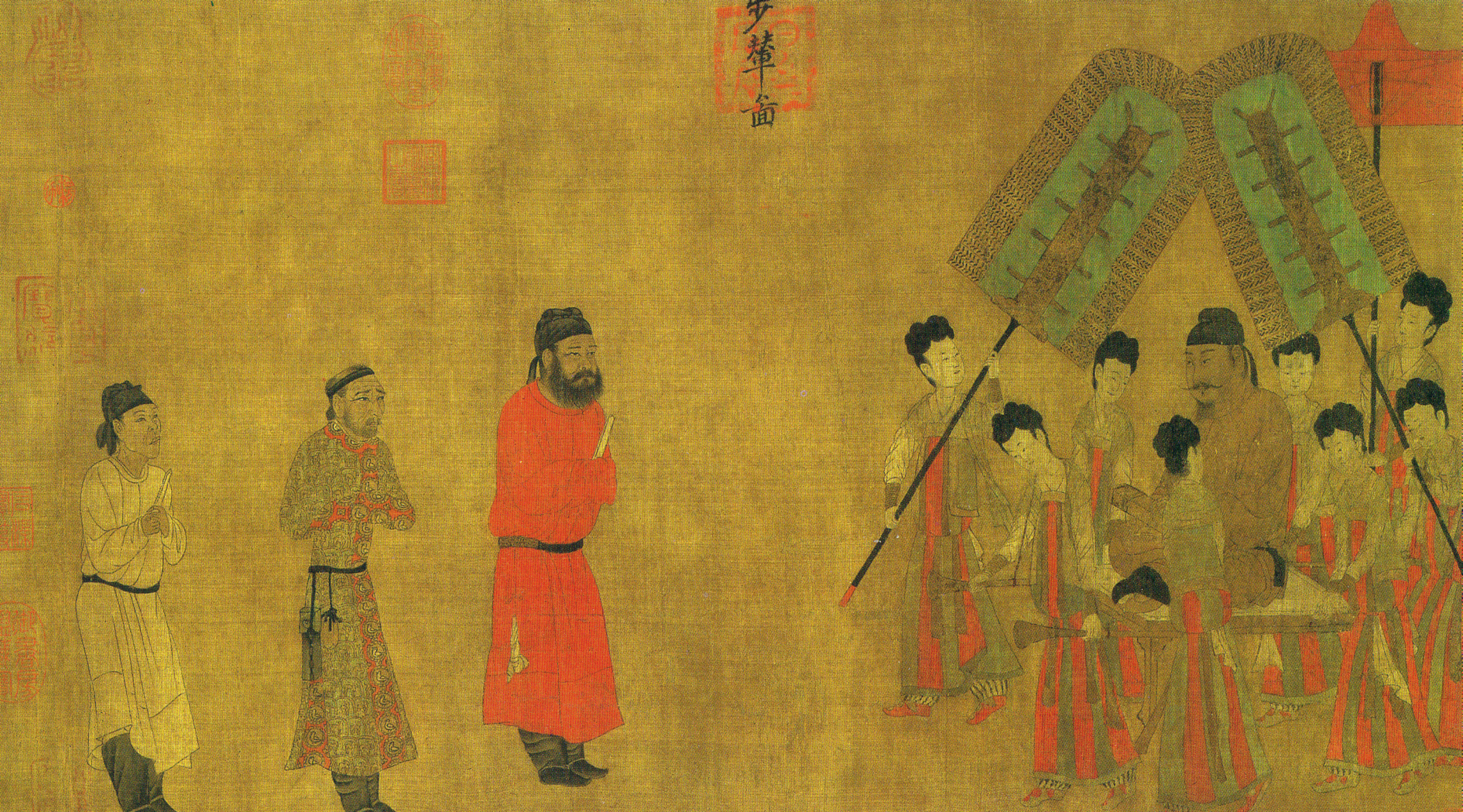
Emperor Taizong of Tang (r. 626–649) giving an audience to Gar Tongtsen Yulsung, ambassador of the Tibetan Empire, in a painting by Tang Chinese artist Yan Liben (600–673 AD)

There also seem to have been interactions between the Byzantine realm and China at this time. Byzantine Greek historian Procopius stated that two Nestorian Christian monks eventually uncovered how silk was made. From this revelation monks were sent by Justinian I as spies on the Silk Road from Constantinople to China and back to steal the silkworm eggs. This resulted in silk production in the Mediterranean, particularly in Thrace, in northern Greece, and giving the Byzantine Empire a monopoly on silk production in medieval Europe until the loss of its territories in Southern Italy. The Byzantine historian Theophylact Simocatta, writing during the reign of Heraclius (r. 610–641), relayed information about China's geography, its capital city Khubdan (Old Turkic: Khumdan, i.e. Chang'an), its current ruler Taisson whose name meant "Son of God" (Chinese: Tianzi, although this could be derived from the name of Emperor Taizong of Tang), and correctly pointed to its reunification by the Sui dynasty (581–618) as occurring during the reign of Maurice, noting that China had previously been divided politically along the Yangzi River by two warring nations. This seems to match the conquest of the Chen dynasty in southern China by Emperor Wen of Sui (r. 581–604).

The Chinese Old Book of Tang and New Book of Tang mention several embassies made by Fu lin (拂菻; i.e. Byzantium), which they equated with Daqin (i.e. the Roman Empire), beginning in 643 with an embassy sent by the king Boduoli (波多力, i.e. Constans II Pogonatos) to Emperor Taizong of Tang, bearing gifts such as red glass. These histories also provided cursory descriptions of Constantinople, its walls, and how it was besieged by Da shi (大食; the Arabs of the Umayyad Caliphate) and their commander "Mo-yi" (摩拽伐之; i.e. Muawiyah I, governor of Syria before becoming caliph), who forced them to pay tribute. Henry Yule highlights the fact that Yazdegerd III (r. 632–651), last ruler of the Sasanian Empire, sent diplomats to China for securing aid from Emperor Taizong (considered the suzerain over Ferghana in Central Asia) during the loss of the Persian heartland to the Islamic Rashidun Caliphate, which may have also prompted the Byzantines to send envoys to China amid their recent loss of Syria to the Muslims. Tang Chinese sources also recorded how Sassanid prince Peroz III (636–679) fled to Tang China following the conquest of Persia by the growing Islamic caliphate. Other Byzantine embassies in Tang China are recorded as arriving in 711, 719, and 742. From Chinese records it is known that Michael VII Doukas (Mie li sha ling kai sa 滅力沙靈改撒) of Fu lin dispatched a diplomatic mission to China's Song dynasty that arrived in 1081, during the reign of Emperor Shenzong of Song.

== Constantine IV ==
=== Siege of Constantinople ===
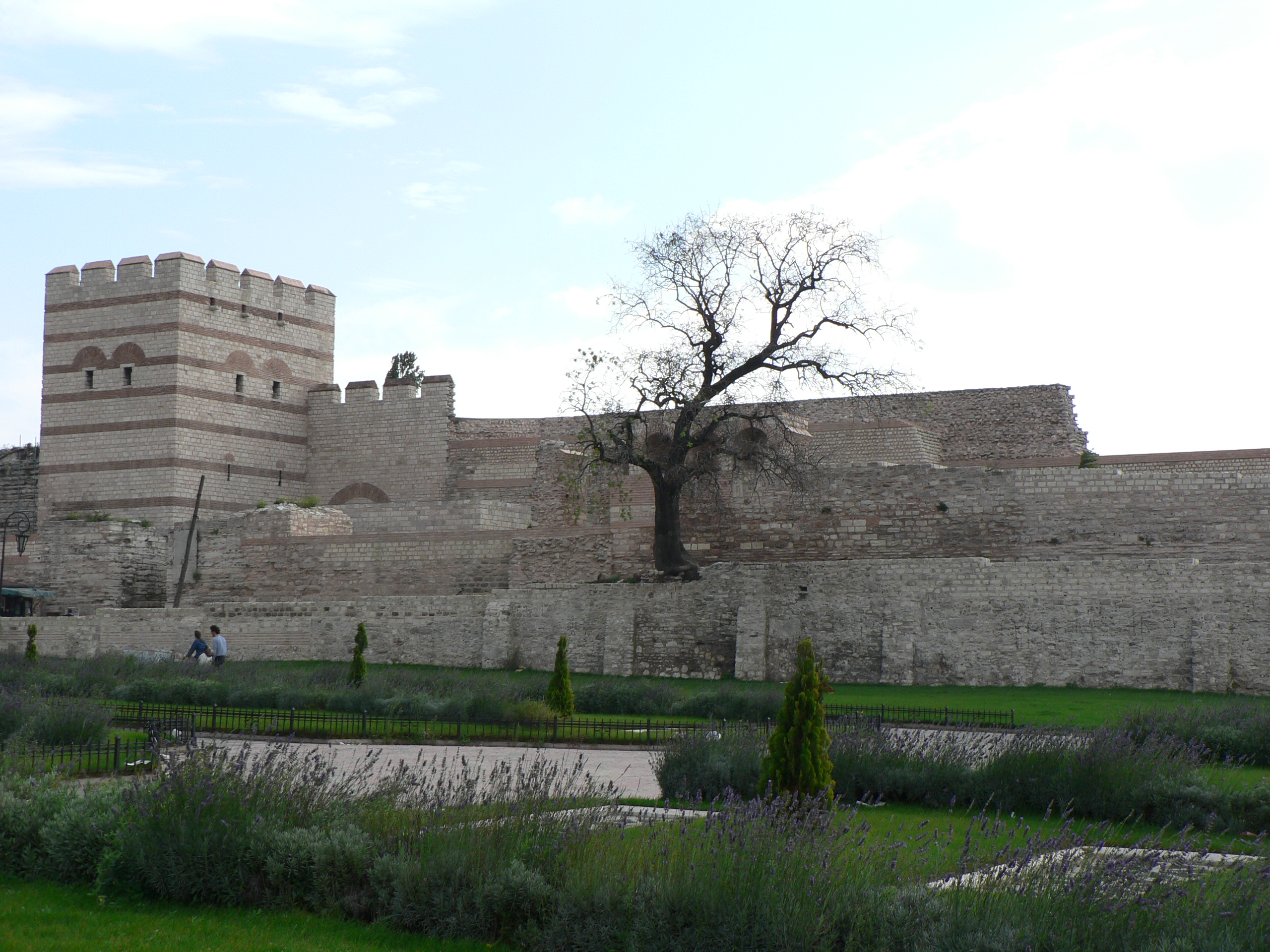
The Arabs failed to breach the heavy walls of Constantinople.

Like his predecessors, the wars with the Saracens continued relatively unabated. Before becoming Emperor, Constantine IV was the administrator of his father's lands for the eastern portions of the Empire, what few territories they were. They became fewer still when the Arabs began taking one Imperial Byzantine city after another along the coast of Ionia. Finally in 672, Muawiya the Caliph captured the peninsula of Cyzicus, only 50 miles (80 km) from Constantinople. The scene was all too depressingly familiar — the capital was under threat and the odds were not favorable to the defenders — the Arabs had brought with them heavy siege weapons and began the siege of Constantinople in 674. Despite this, Constantinople was simply too much for the Arabs — where else before disunity, sheer bad luck or skill & zeal had given the warriors of Islam victory, now it was the defenders of the capital who, armed with Greek fire repelled every Arab assault. Finally in 678, after suffering massive casualties, the Saracens withdrew and Muawiya accepted an offer of peace. By 680, Muawiya was dead and Constantine IV, now at the height of his popularity, had managed to defeat the Arabs, both at land in Lycia and at sea.

=== Wars with the Bulgars ===
With the Saracen threat averted, the Byzantines turned their attention to the west, where the Bulgars were encroaching on Imperial territory. In 680, Constantine IV launched a naval expedition to drive them back — the expedition failed and the Bulgars grew even bolder. Unable to stop them by force, Constantine settled for a humiliating, but not disastrous treaty whereby "protection" money had to be paid to the Bulgar King. The greatest implication of this treaty was that Byzantium would no longer have to worry about the Bulgars for the rest of Constantine's reign.

=== Third Council of Constantinople ===
Constantine IV was determined to solve the problem of the monotheletism/chalcedon controversy once and for all. Calling forth representatives from all corners of Christendom to discuss the matter at hand, they debated until in 681 when Constantine IV, who had presided over much of the meetings, endorsed the virtually unanimous findings. Four years later in 685, Constantine IV died. His death at thirty three years robbed Byzantium of a good Emperor who had defeated her enemies from within as well as without.

Constantine's wife Anastasia had given him a son, Justinian. As it would turn out, his name would dictate his foreign policy in an attempt to emulate Justinian I's conquest of the West — a risky move considering what few resources the Empire had to defend herself.

== Justinian II ==
=== Victories ===
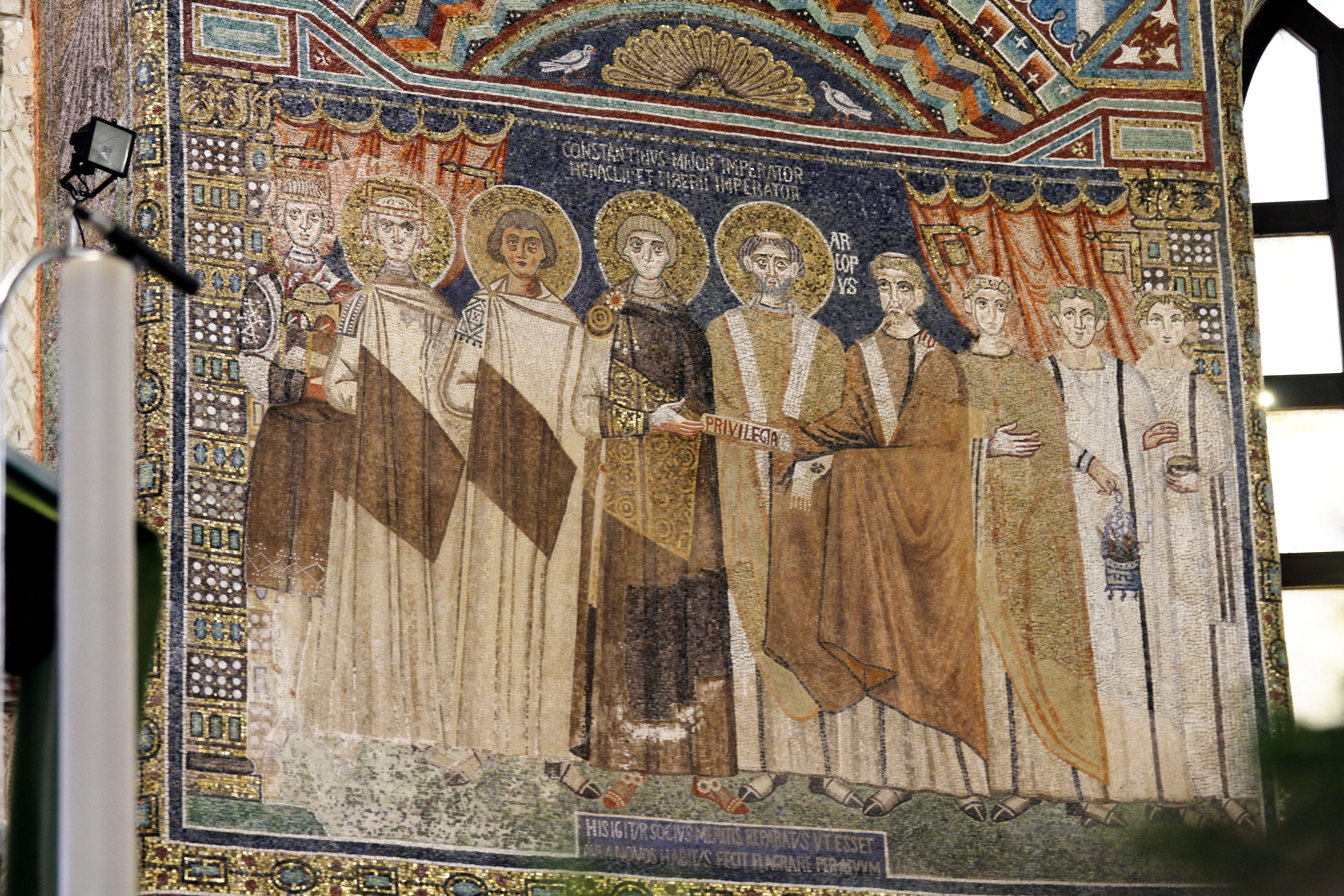
Mosaic of Constantine IV (center) with his co-emperors Heraclius, Tiberius and Justinian II to his right.

The beginning of Justinian's reign continued the successes his father had enjoyed against the Arab invaders. Campaigning into Armenia, Georgia and even Syria, he was able to enforce a renewal of a peace treaty signed by his father and the Caliph. With the wars in the east favorably concluded, Justinian II turned his attention to the west where he sent an expedition against the Slavs between 688 and 689. His success in the west was crowned with a triumphant entry into Thessalonika, the second city of the Empire.

Following these victories, Justinian set about attempting to increase the Opsikion Theme by bringing in some 250,000 settlers of Slavic origin into Asia Minor. The benefit of the move was twofold—in addition to opening up more agricultural land, there would also have been an increase in the population and a larger number of Thematic militia troops could be raised — allowing the Empire to wage war with more. Furthermore, the increase in the lower classes shifted the balance of power from the aristocracy to the class of well-off peasants. These self-sufficient peasants, who owned their own land formed the backbone of the Thematic armies. Under such circumstances the power of the Empire and the Emperor increased simultaneously. Since pre-Imperial times the Plebeians looked towards a military champion to combat the rule of the aristocracy, thus the Plebs supported a strong emperor.

=== Failures ===
In 691, war with the Arabs resumed and Justinian began increasing taxes in order to finance the conflict. However, in the face of these extortionate requisitions some 20,000 Slavic soldiers deserted to the Arabs—with them went Armenia to the enemy. Enraged, Justinian ordered the extermination of all Slavs in Bithynia—countless men, women and children were put to the sword in rage.

Justinian then turned his attention to religious matters, which had been quieted down by the efforts of his father. When he called another council to wrap up loose ends from the previous (fifth and sixth – thus called Quinisext Council) ecumenical councils, trivial and strict proposals were laid out including excommunication for "crimes" ranging from provocative or seductive hair curling, the mention of the pagan gods (especially Bacchus during the grape harvest), the selling of charms, dealing with fortune tellers and even dancing. Hermits were forbidden from talking with townsfolk or presenting themselves in a particular manner. To make matters worse, no representatives were summoned from Rome so when Pope Sergius I was asked to approve of 102 canons he not only refused but managed to use the militias of Rome and Ravenna against the Exarch Zacharias. The clemency of the pope allowed the Exarch of Ravenna to escape with his life.

Upon hearing of this, Justinian is said to have gone into another one of his rages. He was already unpopular at the young age of 23. His heavy handedness in extracting the tax money from the peasants and the rich made him deeply resented, especially with his use of torture, which included the use of fire and whips. It was therefore to no one's surprise (though to many a Byzantine's delight) that rebellion came from the ranks of the aristocracy. The revolt found a leader in a professional but disgraced soldier, Leontius.

== Non-dynastic: Leontius ==
=== Prisoner ===
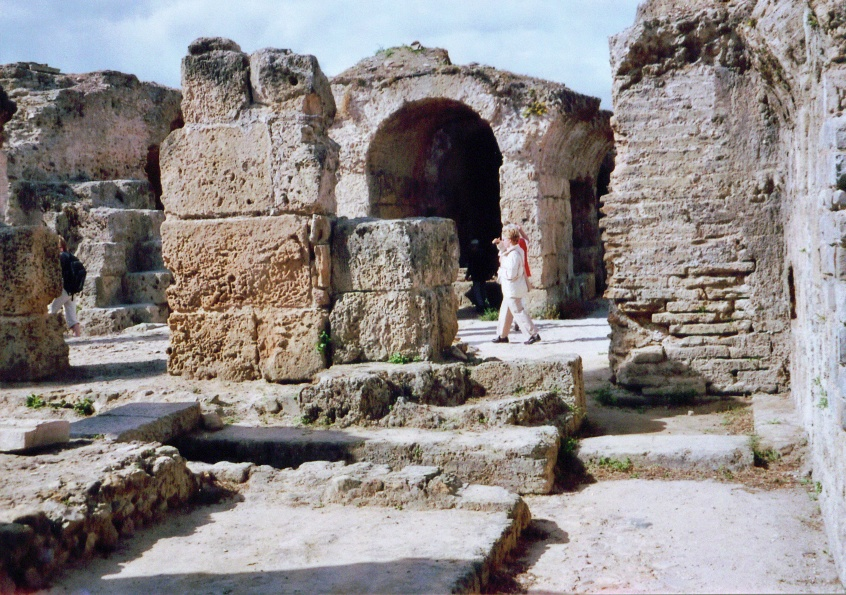
The ruins of Carthage

Leontius was in prison when a monk once told him that he would one day wear the Imperial diadem. Such talk was not only dangerous for the monk (who if discovered would have been blinded and exiled for treason) but also dangerous for the man whose ears received — and preyed upon Leontius' mind until in 695 (after being released) he immediately began a relatively unplanned coup. Fortunately for him many of his comrades had also been imprisoned (suggesting that perhaps his entire unit may well have been disgraced) so when he marched upon his former prison to release the inmates, many declared their support for him.

=== Rise and fall ===
Marching on to the Hagia Sophia, he was fortunate enough to find the support of the Patriarch Callinicus I—whose recent insults to the incumbent Emperor left him in fear of his life and with little choice.

With the support of the fanatical Hippodrome Blue team, Leontius and his men overthrew Justinian II, cutting his nose off in the oriental process of rhinokopia and declaring himself as Basileus.

Leontius' rule was both brief and a miserable failure. The armies of Islam were once more on the march and this time the Exarch of Carthage was in serious trouble. Earlier defeats had established Arab supremacy in the region. Leontius, despite his military background, had an unsuccessful expedition sent to Carthage. Rather than report their loss and face the inevitable wrath of the Emperor, the defeated troops decided to name one of their own as Basileus (a German called Apsimar) and with the support of the Hippodrome Green team (a serious rival of the Blue team that promoted Leontius to the Imperial throne) established Apsimar as Basileus Tiberius III.

== Non-dynastic: Tiberius III ==
Tiberius' rule was similarly short but slightly more impressive for his successful campaigning against the Saracens—indeed it seems that his Germanic heritage had given him the same appetite for war that had allowed many of his "barbarian" kind to conquer the Western Empire, with his troops reaching into Armenia and even Muslim-held Syria. But by that time in 705, he was overthrown by military force. Justinian, who for ten years was in exile, returned. The Byzantine population could not have asked for a worse overthrow.

== Justinian II (restored) ==
=== Years in exile ===
After having been deposed by Leontius, Justinian escaped to the Khagan of the Khazars who welcomed him and even gave his sister as a wife to him. Renaming his wife Theodora he settled at Phanagoria at the entrance to the Sea of Azov where they could keep an eye on Imperial events. Justinian was forced to act when in 704 word reached that he was wanted dead or alive for a handsome reward. Such rumors were confirmed when a band of soldiers arrived at his location. Realizing that his life was in danger, he invited two of the officers (whom he suspected as the assassins) to his house and murdered them. Leaving his wife in the safety of her brother, he fled to Bulgaria, Byzantium's chief opponent in the West. There he secured a pact with the Bulgar King Tervel granting him the title of Caesar if he aided him in regaining the throne of Byzantium.

=== Restoration and rule ===
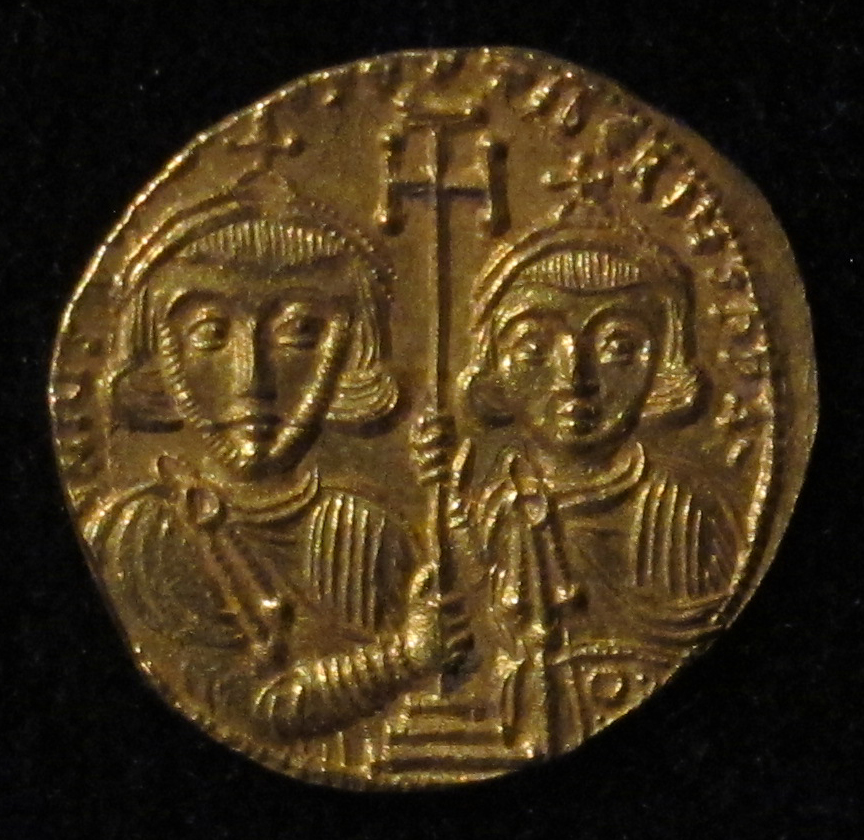
Justinian II and his son Tiberius

In the spring of 705, Constantinople found itself surrounded by yet another army of Slavs and Bulgars, led by Justinian. After three days of scouting his men found an abandoned conduit running across the walls and managed to slip inside. There he surprised the sleeping guards at the Palace of Blachernae. Within moments, the building was his and Tiberius fled to Bithynia whilst the citizens of the capital surrendered—the alternative would have been a savage sack that in the mind of the vengeful Justinian, was what it needed. The following day, Justinian was given the title of Caesar and a purple robe.

With his coup successful, Justinian II set about bringing his wife back and settling the numerous scores he had with his disloyal subjects. Tiberius and his predecessor Leontius were both executed the previous day after a humiliating pelting at the Hippodrome. Next the Patriarch Callinicus, whose offence had led to his hasty support of Leontius and the crowning of both of Justinian's successors led to his blinding and exile to Rome. After that Justinian set about killing Tiberius' brother, Heraclius who was perhaps the best general in the Empire. With him and his staff of officers dead, Byzantium's neighbours lost no time in exploiting the weakened army—suffering major defeats against the barbarian tribes near the mouth of the Danube and losing the vital stronghold of Tyana in Cappadocia.

=== Expeditions of revenge ===
==== Ravenna ====
Bent upon making others suffer as he had, Justinian had an expedition sent against the Exarchate of Ravenna, for reasons which elude historians today—though sheer madness cannot be ruled out. Upon arriving there the expedition led by Theodore sacked the city whilst his men deceptively invited the officials to a banquet where they were seized and sent to Constantinople. Upon arrival they were met by Justinian, who had them all executed except the Archbishop, who nonetheless suffered a blinding and the usual exile—not being able to return until Justinian was in his grave. It was this execution that led to Ravenna being looted by Theodore and his men.

In Rome however the mood was calmed by the Pope Constantine the Syrian. Relations between the Pope and the Emperor had greatly improved—with the Emperor kissing the Pope's feet and sending an impressive delegation before him to meet the Pope (consisting of the Patriarch of Constantinople and Justinian's son and co-emperor). Arriving at Constantinople in 711 he came to an accord with Justinian finally approving half of the 102 canons still outstanding from the Quinisext Council (dealing with the trivial matters he addressed before his exile) and agreeing to drop the other, perhaps less important canons. Satisfied he allowed the Pope a safe journey to Rome.

==== Cherson ====
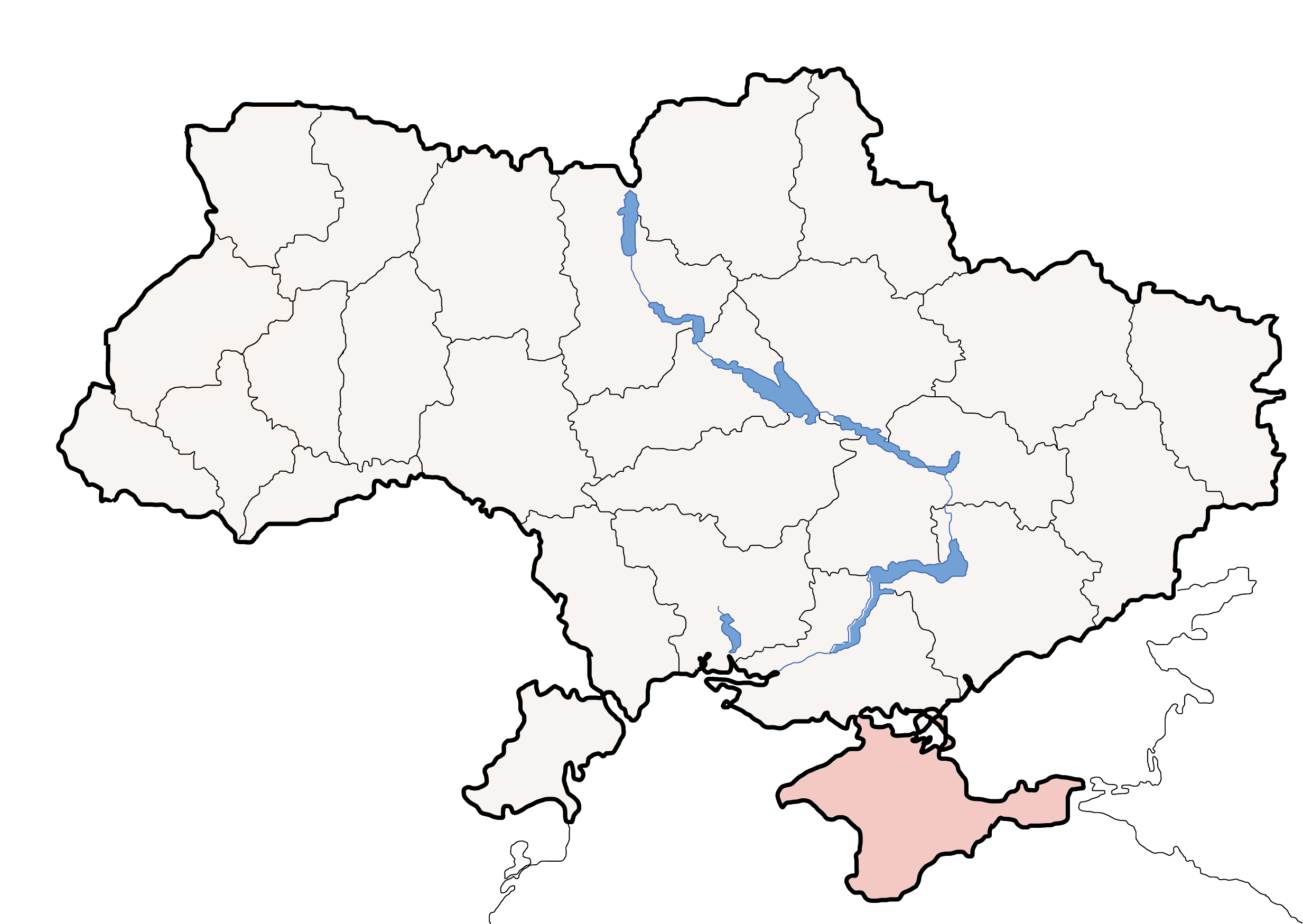
Map of the Crimea. The Ancient Greeks had colonized the region as a trade outpost for the Black Sea.

Justinian then targeted his former place of exile in the Crimea. There his brother-in-law, the Khagan, had infringed on Imperial territory by establishing a Khazar governor of his own to run Cherson. Upon arriving there, the expedition set about doing its work—countless citizens were drowned (apparently with weights attached) and seven were roasted alive. The Tudun, the governor appointed by the Khagan was sent to Constantinople with 30 others. However, a storm destroyed his army and his fleet when he ordered it to return. Justinian is said to have greeted the news with great laughter. Another fleet was sent but the arrival of the Khagan's army made Justinian reconsider his move to a more diplomatic one. He decided to send the Tudun back to the Khagan with his apologies and had George of Syria to present the Imperial apology. The citizens of Cherson were naturally in no mood to hear any apology after what Justinian had done. When the Tudun died along the way, the Khazars took it upon themselves to send his 300-strong escort to the afterlife with him.

==== Overthrow ====
After the fiasco of the Cherson expedition, the citizens there proclaimed a new man, Bardanes (an exiled General) the Basileus of Byzantium. Justinian was enraged at these turn of events. Once more he began redirecting resources to another expedition under the Patriarch Maurus against Cherson, resources that could have been better spent against the Arabs or the Bulgars. The Khazars appeared at the scene preventing the expedition from destroying no more than two defense towers before being obliged to make terms. The Patriarch realized that returning to the capital in defeat would undoubtedly lead to a violent retirement at the hands of Justinian. Therefore, in a similar case to Leontius and Tiberius' usurpation, he defected and, with the army and navy under his command, declared his support for the renegade Bardanes, who changed his name to Philippicus.

As Philippicus headed for the Capital Justinian was making his way to Armenia, a warzone between the Byzantines and Arabs. He reached as far as Nicomedia when attempting to turn back, he was caught at the twelfth mile stone of the Capital and executed on the spot. Philippicus had arrived before he could and was greeted with open arms at the capital.

Theodora, the Khazar wife of Justinian II escaped to a nearby monastery with her son and former co-emperor Tiberius. The young boy was holding on to the True Cross when a soldier entered and forced his hand from it. It is said that the soldier then laid the Cross with great respect on the altar. Following this rather pious act, he then dragged the boy outside and beneath the porch of a nearby church, butchered the line of Heraclius into extinction forever.

== Heraclian dynasty family tree ==
Maurice emperor	Gregoras patricius	Epiphania	Heraclius the Elder exarch of Africa
Theodore curopalates
Maria	Khosrow II shah of Persia	(sister)	Shahrbaraz shah of Persia	Nicetas governor of Egypt	Fabia Eudokia	Heraclius; 610–641	Martina empress regent
Nike	Gregoria	Constantine III; 641	Eudoxia Epiphania	illegitimate John Athalarichos	Theodosios	Fabius (Flavius) (?)	Constantine caesar	Heraclonas; 641
Theodosios	Manyanh	Fausta	Constans II; 641–668	David Tiberius caesar	Martinus caesar	Augoustin	Martina	Febronia
Tiberius	Heraclius	Constantine IV; 668–685	Anastasia
Heraclius	Eudokia	Justinian II; 685–695; 705–711	Theodora of Khazaria
Anastasia	Tiberius

== Timeline ==
- Red denotes Senior Emperor (basileus after 629)
- Pink denotes Junior Emperors (augustus after 629)
- Orange denotes Caesars
- Yellow denotes Nobelissimoi

== See also ==
- Byzantine–Arab Wars
- Family tree of Byzantine emperors
