= Martina (daughter of Heraclius) =

7th-century Byzantine princess

Martina or Anastasia was a Byzantine princess, daughter of Emperor Heraclius (r. 610–641) and his second wife Empress Martina (r. 613–641).

== Life ==
She was proclaimed Augusta. Her coronation took place on 4 July 638, during the coronation ceremony held at the Augustaion, at which her siblings Heraclonas, Augustina, and David were proclaimed Augustus, Augusta, and Caesar, respectively. These appointments were intended to solidify the ruling dynasty; however, they failed to achieve the desired result, instead provoking controversy and resentment toward the emperor.
