= Martina (empress) =

Roman empress from 613 to 641

- Augusta
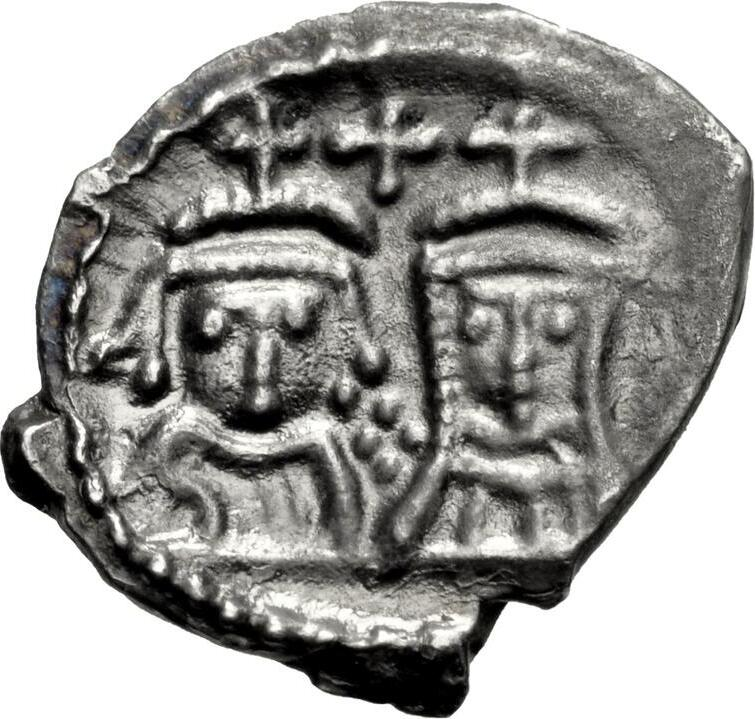
- Half-siliqua minted under Heraclius depicting his son Constantine (left) and Martina (right)

Empress of the Byzantine Empire
- Tenure: 613–641
- Born: 6th century
- Died: after 641; Rhodes
- Spouse: Heraclius
- Issue more...: Heraclonas
- Dynasty: Heraclian Dynasty
- Father: Martinus
- Mother: Maria

Martina (Greek: Μαρτίνα, romanized: Martína; died after 641) was an empress of the Eastern Roman Empire, the second wife of her uncle the emperor Heraclius, and regent in 641 with her son. She was a daughter of Maria, Heraclius' sister, and a certain Martinus. Maria and Heraclius were children of Heraclius the Elder and his wife Epiphania according to the chronicle of Theophanes the Confessor.

== Empress ==
Eudokia, the first wife of Heraclius, died on 13 August 612. According to the Chronographikon syntomon of Ecumenical Patriarch Nikephoros I of Constantinople, the cause of death was epilepsy.

According to Theophanes, Martina married her maternal uncle not long after, placing the marriage in 613 at the latest. However, Nikephoros places the marriage during the wars with the Eurasian Avars which took place in the 620s.

The marriage was considered to fall within the prohibited degree of kinship, according to the rules of Chalcedonian Christianity concerning incest. This particular case of marriage between an uncle and a niece had been declared illegal since the time of the Codex Theodosianus. Thus the marriage was disapproved by the people of Constantinople and the Church. The unpopularity of the marriage was further exacerbated by the populace's adoration for the previous empress.

Despite his disapproval and attempts to convince Heraclius to repudiate Martina, Patriarch Sergius I of Constantinople performed the ceremony himself and crowned Martina in the Augustaeum after she was proclaimed augusta by Heraclius. Even the members of the imperial family voiced their objections, with Heraclius' brother (and Martina's uncle) Theodore continually criticizing Heraclius by pointing out that his sin 'is continually before him' in reference to Martina and their offspring.

The emperor and the empress were, however, clearly a close couple: Martina accompanied her husband in his most difficult campaigns against the Sassanid Empire. She was also at his side at Antioch when the news was received of the serious defeat by the Arabs at the river Yarmuk in August 636. These defeats would haunt Martina through her regency and make her increasingly unpopular. Her unpopularity with the people of Constantinople may have possibly led to her removal from coinage in 629. However, other scholars advise caution against such a view, as her disappearance in coinage came at the same time as Heraclius' major monetary reform.

== Regent ==
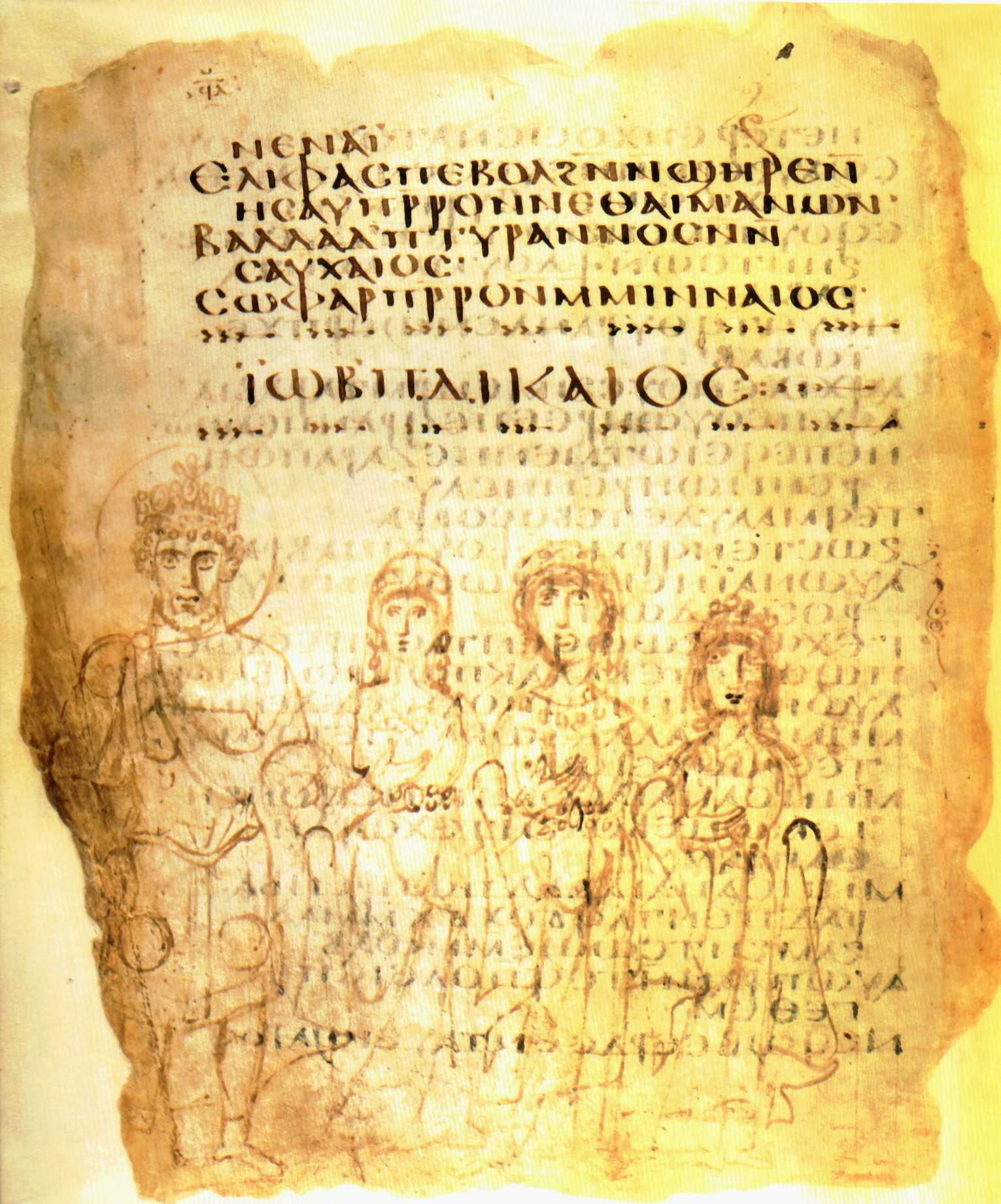
An early 7th-century drawing depicting Job and his family represented as Heraclius (left), Martina (far right), his sister Epiphania, and his daughter Eudoxia.

On his deathbed in 641, Heraclius left the empire to both Heraclius Constantine, his son from his first marriage, and Heraclonas, his son with Martina, granting them equal rank. Martina was to be honoured as empress and mother of both of them, as well as insofar as she might have influence at court as well.

Heraclius died on 11 February 641 of an edema which Nikephoros considered a divine punishment for his sinful marriage. Three days later Martina took the initiative in announcing the contents of Heraclius' will in a public ceremony. The authority for such a ceremony typically belonged to the succeeding emperor, not to the empress. Martina was attempting to establish her own authority over the two co-emperors.

The ceremony took place in the Hippodrome of Constantinople. Present were members of the Byzantine Senate, other dignitaries and the crowds of Constantinople. Absent were both Constantine and Heraclonas. Martina read the contents of the will and claimed the senior authority in the Empire for herself. However the crowd instead acclaimed the names of the two emperors and not her own, thus objecting to her assumption of imperial authority. She was forced to return to the palace in defeat.

Relations of Martina and her stepson were always difficult. Because of Heraclonas' young age, Martina ruled through him, consistently opposing the policies of Constantine, leading to the creation of two different political factions. When Heraclius Constantine died suddenly of tuberculosis only four months later, the common belief was that the empress poisoned him to leave Heraclonas as sole ruler. However historians like Herren and Garland have stated that this is most likely not true. With his death and her son becoming sole ruler, Martina gained complete and uncontested control over the government. Martina began immediately to exile the prominent supporters of Constantine and with the help of Patriarch Pyrrhus, one of her primary advisors, revived the policy of monothelitism. She recalled Bishop Cyrus of Alexandria and sent him to Egypt after his exile, showing her dedication to the policy of monothelitism.

== Downfall and deposition ==
Her actions and the rumors of poisoning Constantine caused the people and the Senate to turn against Martina and her son. The Armenian Valentinus with the troops from Asia Minor, marched to Chalcedon and a frightened Heraclonas named Constans II, son of late Constantine, a co-emperor.

After September 641 there was a huge revolt and the army ransacked the harvest on the Asiatic side of the Bosphoros. That month, Martina lost the support of one of her devout followers, Pyrrhus of Constantinople, who abandoned the city after being repeatedly assaulted and followed. This left her vulnerable to the Senate who despised her.

In November 641, their downfall was completed as the army marched on Constantinople and captured Martina and her three sons, Heraclonas, David and Marinos. Martina's tongue was slit, her sons had their noses cut off, and her youngest sons were castrated. Eventually they were sent to Rhodes.

== Analysis ==
Lynda Garland completed a comprehensive study of Byzantine empresses, covering Martina extensively. She summarised that Empress Martina was a 'scapegoat' for the failure against Arab expansion as well as the continuation of her husband's policies of monothelitism. Martina's ambition for her family did cause resentment amongst the people of Constantinople. However, she continued the legacy of providing and fighting for her heirs, similarly to many other Byzantine empresses.

== Children ==
Martina and Heraclius had several children, though the names and order of these children are questions for debate:

- Constantine. Died young. (Note: The chronicle of Theophanes the Confessor states that "the other Constantine" was named caesar in 617. However, this is most likely a confusion caused by misdating the indiction. The event must refer to the elevation of Heraclonas as caesar in 632.)
- Fabius, who had a paralyzed neck. Died young. (Note: His name is given in the history of Nicephorus I of Constantinople. The earliest known manuscript calls him "Fabius", while a latter version calls him "Flavius". He's not mentioned ever again, hence why it is assumed he died young.)
- Theodosius, who was a deaf-mute, married Nike, daughter of Persian general Shahrbaraz.
- Heraclonas, emperor 638–641.
- David Tiberios (born on 7 November 630), proclaimed caesar in 638. He was briefly proclaimed augustus and co-emperor with Heraclonas and Constans in 641. Deposed, mutilated and exiled to Rhodes.
- Martinus. A caesar. Possibly the youngest son that died after being emasculated according to John of Nikiu.
- Augustina. Proclaimed an augusta in 638.
- Martina and/or Anastasia. Proclaimed augusta in 638.

Of these at least two were disabled, which was seen as punishment for the illegality of the marriage and may have been a consequence of inbreeding.

== Bibliography ==
- Garland, Lynda (1999). "Martina (?615/16–41)". Byzantine Empresses: Women and Power in Byzantium. Routledge. pp. 61–72. ISBN 0-415-14688-7.
- Charles, Robert H. (2007) [1916]. The Chronicle of John, Bishop of Nikiu: Translated from Zotenberg's Ethiopic Text. Merchantville, NJ: Evolution Publishing. ISBN 9781889758879.
- Nicephorus (1990). Short history. Translated by Cyril Mango. Dumbarton Oaks. ISBN 0-88402-184-X.
- Martindale, J. R.; Jones, A. H. M.; Morris, John, eds. (1971–1992). Prosopography of the Later Roman Empire. Cambridge University Press.
- Ostrogorsky, George (1956). History of the Byzantine State. Oxford: Basil Blackwell.

Royal titles
Preceded by Eudokia	Byzantine Empress consort c. 613–641	Succeeded by Gregoria
