= Eudoxia Epiphania =

Byzantine princess

Eudoxia Epiphania (Greek: Εύδοκία Επιφανεία, romanized: Eúdokía Epiphaneía, 7 July 611 – before 4 January 639; also known as Epiphania, Eudocia or Eudokia) was the only daughter of the Byzantine Emperor Heraclius and his first wife Eudokia.

== Life ==
She was born at Constantinople on July 7, 611, baptized on August 15, and crowned Augusta (in the oratory of St. Stephen in the palace) on October 4 of the same year.

When she was about 15 years old, her father allied with the Western Göktürks and the Khazars against the Sassanian Persians and the Eurasian Avars. To secure the assistance of the Turks, Eudoxia was promised in marriage to either the Turkic ruler Ziebel (probably Tong Yabghu) (Note: Ziebel is also identified as Sipi khagan, Tong Yabghu's brother or uncle.) or his son. She was afterwards sent to her Turkic husband, but the news of his death stopped her journey, and prevented the consummation of the marriage.

She died before 4 January 639, since she is not named in the de ceremoniis of that day.

== Resources ==
- Garland, Lynda. "Epiphania (daughter of Heraclius)". De Imperatoribus Romanis. Archived from the original on 2001-05-30.
- Artamonov, Mikhail. Istoriya Khazar. Leningrad, 1962.
- Brook, Kevin Alan. The Jews of Khazaria. 2nd ed. Rowman & Littlefield Publishers, Inc, 2006.
- Christian, David. A History of Russia, Mongolia and Central Asia. Blackwell, 1999.
- Ducange. Familiae Byzantinae. Paris, 1680. p. 118.
- Dunlop, Douglas M. History of the Jewish Khazars. Princeton Univ. Press, 1954.
- Gibbon, Edward. The History of the Decline and Fall of the Roman Empire. London, 1845. Ch. 46.

== See also ==
- List of Byzantine emperors
- List of Roman and Byzantine Empresses
