= Early Christian Necropolis of Pécs =

World Heritage Site in Hungary

Early Christian Necropolis of Pécs (Sopianae)
UNESCO World Heritage Site
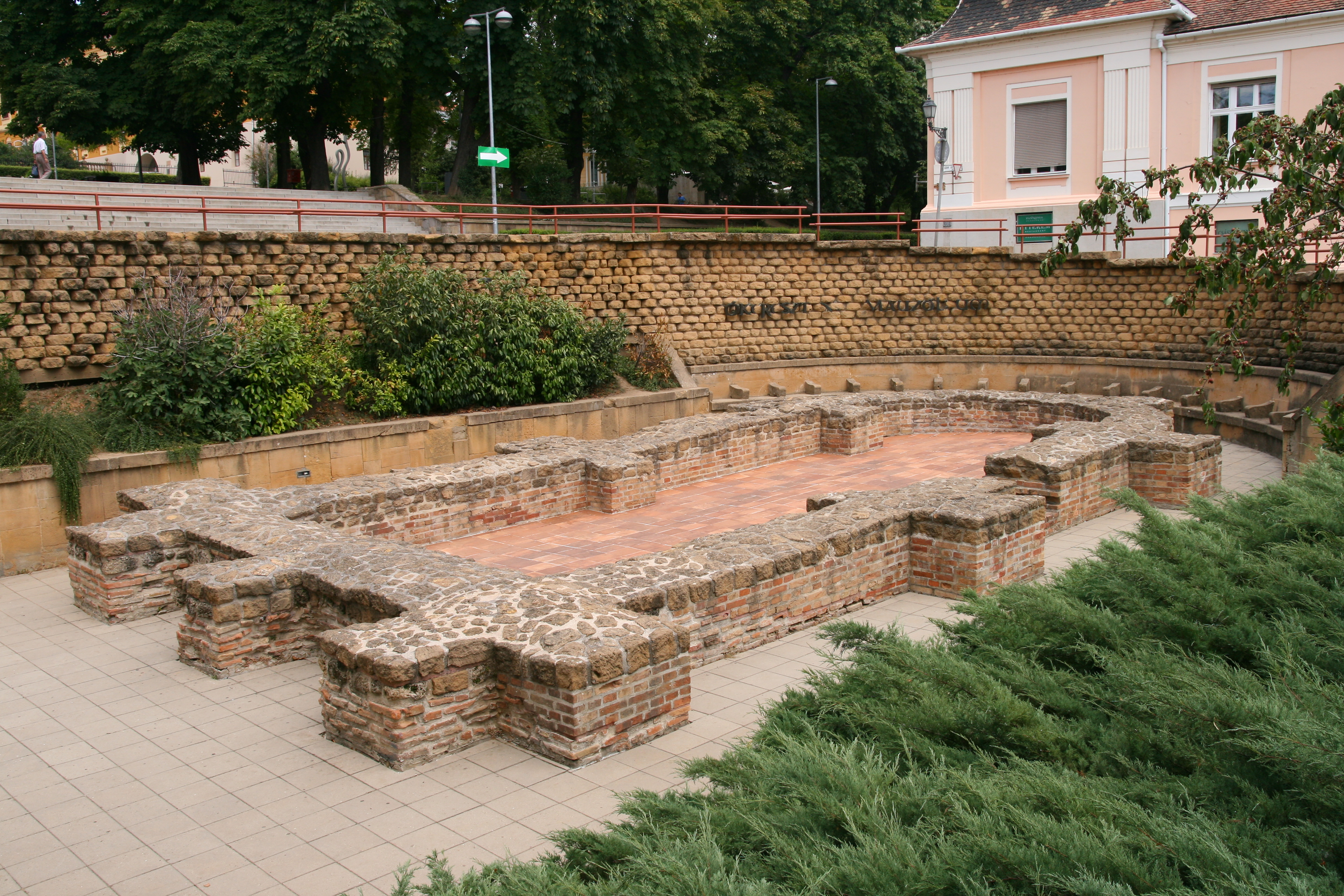
- Remnants of an Early Christian Church, 4th century AD
- Interactive map of Early Christian Necropolis of Pécs (Sopianae)
- Criteria: Cultural: iii, iv
- Reference: 853
- Inscription: 2000 (24th Session)
- Area: 3.76 ha (9.3 acres)
- Buffer zone: 4.87 ha (12.0 acres)

The Early Christian Necropolis of Pécs is a Roman cemetery and archeological site in Pécs, Hungary. Dating from the 4th century AD, the necropolis contains many decorated tombs, mausoleums, and burial chapels from the Early Christian period. It is one of the most significant Roman cemeteries outside of Italy. Because of its size, unique architecture, artistry, and testimony to the spread of Christianity in the Late Roman Empire, the necropolis was added to the UNESCO World Heritage List in 2000.

== History ==
In the 1st century AD, what would become western Hungary was incorporated into the Roman Empire as part of the province of Pannonia. Soon thereafter, the town of Sopianae was founded where modern-day Pécs stands, by colonists from the west who had intermarried with the local Illyrian-Celtic people. By the 4th century, the town had become prosperous because of its location at the crossroads of multiple trading routes. A cemetery was built to the north of the town, where it was used for Christian burials until the dissolution of the Roman Empire.

The first of the chambers was rediscovered and excavated in 1782, after the demolition of a Renaissance-era palace. Further excavations in the 20th century led by Otto Szőnyi and architect István Möller uncovered more tombs.

== Description ==
In total, the necropolis contains 20 excavated monuments and over 500 more modest graves clustering around the major monuments. This represents one of the largest and densest collections of burial monuments in the northern and western Roman provinces. The monuments were for the wealthy families of Sopianae and served as both the burial site and the location of the burial ceremonies for these families. The necropolis has two stories: a network of underground chambers, catacombs, and crypts built out of limestone where the dead would be buried in sarcophagi or brick tombs, and above-ground chapels and mausoleums built on top. The burial chambers are richly decorated with murals depicting scenes from Christianity (including images of the Apostles, Jonah, and Shadrach, Meshach, and Abednego), in addition to floral, and geometric patterns. In some of the chambers, portraits of the interred line the walls.
