= Heraclius Constantine =

Byzantine emperor in 641

- Emperor of the Romans
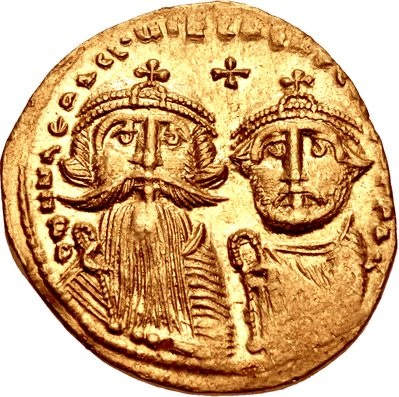
- Solidus of Heraclius Constantine (right) with his father Heraclius (left)

Byzantine emperor
- Reign: 11 February – 25 May 641
- Coronation: 22 January 613
- Predecessor: Heraclius
- Successor: Heraclonas
- Co-emperor: Heraclonas
- Born: 3 May 612
- Died: 25 May 641 (Note: Or, according to the Necrologium, 20 April, which would make a total reign of 99 days (counting from 11 January) as opposed to the "103 days" (from 11 February) indicated by Nikephoros. The latter date, 11 February, is traditionally the most accepted.) (aged 29); Chalcedon, Bithynia (now Kadıköy, Istanbul)
- Spouse: Gregoria
- Issue: Constans II; Theodosius
Names
- Heraclius Constantinus
Regnal name
- Latin: Imperator Caesar Flavius Heraclius novus Constantinus Augustus; Greek: Αὐτοκράτωρ καῖσαρ Φλάβιος Ἡράκλειος νέος Κωνσταντῖνος αὐγουστος
- Dynasty: Heraclian
- Father: Heraclius
- Mother: Fabia Eudokia
- Religion: Chalcedonian Christianity

Heraclius Constantine (Latin: Heraclius novus Constantinus; Greek: Ἡράκλειος νέος Κωνσταντῖνος, romanized: Hērákleios néos Kōnstantīnos; 3 May 612 – 25 May 641), often enumerated as Constantine III, was one of the shortest reigning sole Byzantine emperors, ruling for three months in 641. He was the eldest son of Emperor Heraclius and his first wife Fabia Eudokia.

== Early life ==
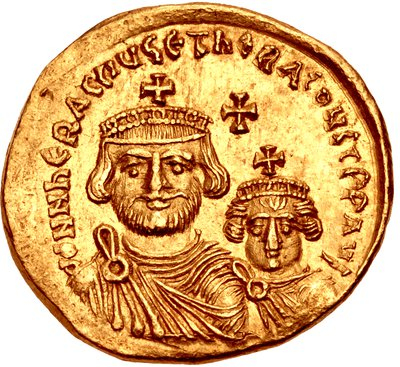
Solidus of Heraclius (left) and an infant Heraclius Constantine (right) minted circa 613-616 after the latter's coronation.

Heraclius Constantine was born on 3 May 612, to the recently-crowned emperor Heraclius and his first wife Fabia Eudokia, and baptised by the patriarch of Constantinople Sergius I. Constantine's mother passed away three months later in August of epilepsy and soon after Constantine's elder sister, born the year prior, was proclaimed Augusta in October, followed by Constantine's own coronation as Augustus on 22 January 613. Subsequently, Constantine was betrothed to Gregoria, a daughter of his father's first cousin, Nicetas. As the couple were second cousins, the marriage was technically incestuous, but this consideration must have been outweighed by the advantages of the match to the family as a whole. Furthermore, its illegality paled into insignificance beside Heraclius' marriage to his niece Martina the same year. In comparison, Constantine's marriage was far less scandalous than that of his father.

Growing up in the midst of the Byzantine–Sasanian War of 602–628, Constantine was left as the sole emperor in Constantinople under the care of Sergius and the patrician Bonus after Heraclius' departure in April 622 to confront the Persians. Simultaneous conflict with the Avars, resulted in the khagan Bayan III being named the symbolic regent (epitropos) of Constantine in 623, however peace wouldn't last and in 626 the Persians and Avars together laid siege to Constantinople, where Constantine, now 14, participated in the defence of the city. That same year, Constantine's half brother Heraclonas was born whilst his father and mother were on campaign in Lazica.

Heraclius returned victorious to Constantinople in 629 after the conclusion of the war with Persia. Around the same time, Constantine and Gregoria married and gave birth to a son Constantine (Constans II) on 7 November 630, the same day as Heraclius Constantine's own half-brother David was born. Having formally assumed the title of basileus in 629, Heraclius instituted a re-organisation of the imperial college to accommodate his extended family that now consisted of three sons and one grandson; Constantine remained at the now sub-ordinate rank of Augustus, but on 1 January 632 assumed the consulship at the same ceremony where Heraclonas was raised to the rank of Caesar. (Note: Theophanes dates the event to 613, but he also states that it occurred in the 5th indiction, that is, 617. Official documents indicate that it occurred in the next indictional cycle, that is, 632.) The pre-eminence of his step-mother Martina and her children lead to a gradual weakening of Constantine's position, whose role was restricted to ceremonial roles in the place of his father. At a ceremony on 4 July 638 attended by Constantine, Heraclonas was made Augustus, David took his place as Caesar and the recently-born younger brother Martinus was raised to the rank of nobilissimus.

== Sole Reign ==
Constantine became senior emperor when his father died on 11 February 641. He reigned together with his younger half-brother Heraclonas, the son of Martina. Another shuffling of the imperial college saw Constantine's son Constans promoted to Caesar, ahead of his half-uncle David and Martinus, who was also promoted and the anonymous youngest son took Martinus' place as nobilissimus.

Constantine's supporters feared action against him on the part of Martina and Heraclonas, and the treasurer Philagrius advised him to write to the army, informing them that he was dying and asking for their assistance in protecting the rights of his children. He also sent a vast sum of money, more than two million solidi (gold coins), to Valentinus, an adjutant of Philagrius, to distribute to the soldiers to persuade them to secure the succession for his sons after his death.

He died of tuberculosis after only three months, on 25 May, leaving Heraclonas sole emperor. A rumor that Martina had him poisoned led first to the imposition of Constans II as co-emperor and then to the deposition, mutilation, and banishment of Martina and her sons.

== Family ==
In 629 or 630, Constantine married Gregoria, the daughter of Niketas. They had two sons:

- Constans II, who succeeded as emperor
- Theodosius

== Regnal name ==
The Romans themselves did not use regnal numbers, which are instead applied to the emperors by modern historians. There is particular confusion surrounding the name "Constantine III" as it has been also applied to the earlier Western emperor Constantine (r. 407–411), who started as a usurper but was later recognized by Honorius (r. 395–423). Charles le Beau (1701–1778), who established the convention of numbering eleven Constantines, uses the numeral only for the Eastern emperor. Edward Gibbon (1737–1794) also explicitly refers to the Western emperor as a usurper and gives the numeral to the Eastern one. Justin Sabatier (1792–1869) and Louis Félicien de Saulcy (1807–1880) notably enumerate Heraclius Constantine as "Heraclius II", a numeral often used for his brother Heraclonas, but refer to the next Constantine as Constantine IV, thus indirectly counting the Western emperor. This numbering has been followed by a few authors. Warwick Wroth (1858–1911) uses no numeral for Heraclius Constantine and uses "Constantine III" as an alternative name for Constans II. The Prosopography of the Later Roman Empire (PLRE) (1980) uses the numeral solely for the Eastern emperor, while the Oxford Dictionary of

Byzantium (1991) uses it solely for the Western one. Philip Grierson (1910–2006) applies the numeral to both emperors, but treats "Constantine III" more like an alternate name for Heraclius Constantine, who is not given a numeral in the index. The Roman Imperial Coinage (RIC), which ends with the fall of the West, uses the numeral for the Western emperor, which has now become standard. Strangely enough, both Constantines had a son called Constans. Neither the RIC, PLRE nor Grierson give the Western one a numeral, yet he's still often called "Constans II".

== See also ==
- List of Byzantine emperors

Heraclius Constantine Byzantine Empire under the Heraclian dynasty Born: 3 May 612 Died: 25 May 641
Regnal titles
Preceded by Heraclius	Byzantine emperor 613–641 with Heraclius, 613–641 and Heraclonas, 641	Succeeded by Heraclonas
Political offices
Preceded by Heraclius in 611, then lapsed	Roman consul 632	Succeeded by Lapsed, Heraclonas in 639
