= Fabia Eudokia =

Roman empress from 610 to 612

Eudokia
- Augusta
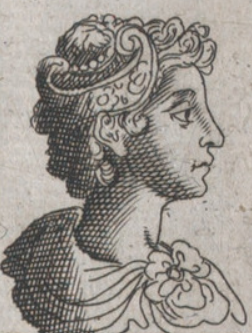
- Imaginary 16th-century portrait from Speculum Romanae Magnificentiae

Empress of the Byzantine Empire
- Tenure: 610–612
- Born: c. 580; Exarchate of Africa
- Died: 13 August 612 (aged c. 31–32); Constantinople (modern-day Istanbul, Turkey)
- Burial: Church of the Holy Apostles
- Spouse: Heraclius
- Issue: Eudoxia Epiphania; Constantine III
- Dynasty: Heraclian
- Father: Rogas

Eudokia or Eudocia (Greek: Εὐδοκία, romanized: Eudokía; c. 580 – 13 August 612), originally named Fabia, was a North African woman who became Eastern Roman empress as the first wife of Heraclius from 610 to her death. She was a daughter of Rogas, a wealthy African man, according to Theophanes the Confessor.

== Empress ==
Her birth name was Fabia, she was betrothed to Heraclius when the future emperor still resided in the Exarchate. The Exarch at the time was her father-in-law Heraclius the Elder.

Heraclius had started a revolt against Phocas in 608. Under unknown circumstances both Fabia and her mother-in-law Epiphania seem to have been captured by Phocas by 610. They spent their captivity in the monastery "Nea Metanoia" (New Repentance) and were used as hostages to prevent Heraclius from besieging Constantinople. The two women were eventually released by members of the Green faction of Byzantine chariot racing events. They were delivered to Heraclius at the small island of Kalonymos in the Sea of Marmara, leaving him free to launch his successful assault. The Excubitors defected to his side and thus allowed him to enter the city without serious resistance. On 5 October 610, Heraclius was proclaimed Emperor and, on the same day, married Fabia. She took the name Eudokia and was granted the title of Augusta.

== Death ==
Eudokia died on 13 August 612. According to the Chronographikon syntomon of Ecumenical Patriarch Nikephoros I of Constantinople, the cause of death was epilepsy. According to Nikephoros, her funeral was accompanied with an incident revealing how popular she was with the general populace. A maidservant spat out of an upstairs window while the funeral procession was just below it. The coffin was still open, and the saliva reached the robes of the corpse. The crowds took offense and burned the girl alive.

Eudokia was buried the next day in the Church of the Holy Apostles. Heraclius went on to marry his niece Martina.

== Children ==
Eudokia and Heraclius had two children:

- Eudoxia Epiphania, a daughter. Born on 7 July 611. She was proclaimed Augusta on 4 October 612.
- Heraclius Constantine, a son, who went on to be Emperor Constantine III. Born on 3 May 612. Crowned co-emperor on 22 January 613.

== See also ==
- List of Roman and Byzantine empresses

Royal titles
Preceded by Leontia	Byzantine Empress consort 610–612	Succeeded by Martina
