= Heraclonas =

Byzantine emperor in 641

- Emperor of the Romans
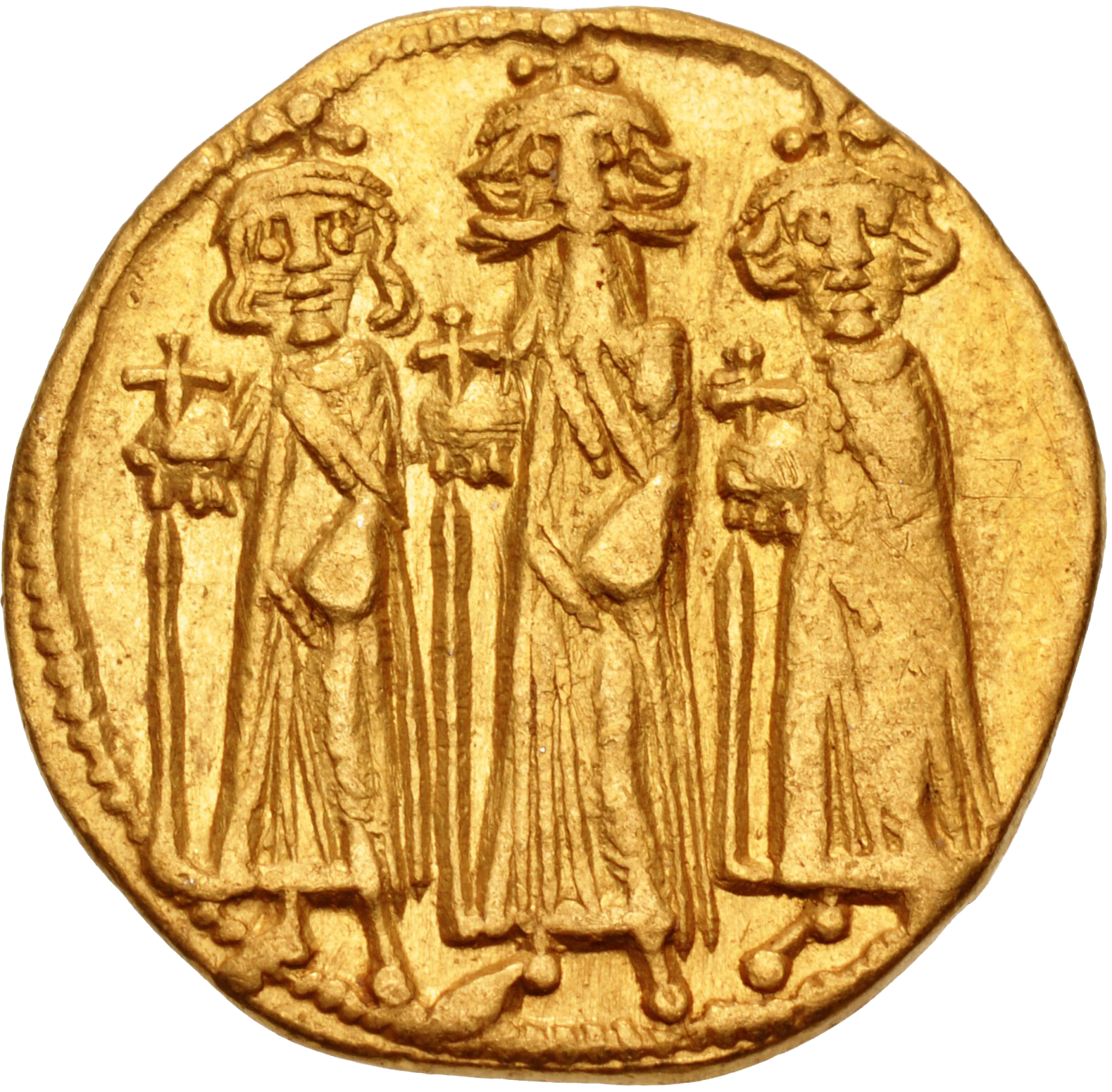
- Solidus depicting Heraclonas (left), Heraclius (center) and Constantine III (right).

Byzantine emperor
- Reign: February – October/ November 641
- Coronation: 4 July 638
- Predecessor: Heraclius Constantine
- Successor: Constans II
- Co-emperor: Constantine III (until May 641); Tiberius (October 641)
- Caesar: 1 January 632 – 4 July 638
- Born: 626; Lazica
- Died: 642 (aged 15–16); Rhodes
Names
- Heraclius (Note: Heraclonas' full name is sometimes given as "Constantinus Heraclius" on the authority of Theophanes, who calls him "the younger Constantine, also called Herakleios". Constantine III is referred as "his own brother, the little Constantine". On this basis, Philip Grierson attributed to Heraclonas several coins previously thought to represent Constans II. However, George E. Bates used other numismatic evidence to show that the emperor depicted is indeed Constans II, and that Heraclonas only ruled as "Heraclius".)
Regnal name
- Latin: Imperator Caesar Flavius Heraclius Augustus; Greek: Αὐτοκράτωρ καῖσαρ Φλάβιος Ἡράκλειος αὐγουστος
- Dynasty: Heraclian
- Father: Heraclius
- Mother: Martina
- Religion: Chalcedonian Christianity

Heraclius (Latin: Heraclius, Ancient Greek: Ἡράκλειος, romanized: Hērákleios; 626 – 642), known by the diminutive Heraclonas or Heracleonas (Greek: Ἡρακλ[ε]ωνᾶς, romanized: Hērákl[ei]onas), and sometimes enumerated as Heraclius II, (Note: He is even more rarely called Heraclius III, with Heraclius Constantine numbered as 'Heraclius II' instead of 'Constantine III'.) was briefly Byzantine emperor in 641.

Heraclonas was the son of Heraclius and his niece Martina, whose blood relation made their marriage unpopular. Upon his death in February 641 Heraclius was succeeded jointly by Constantine III, his son from a previous marriage, and by Heraclonas, with Martina receiving the title Μήτηρ καὶ Βασίλισσα or Mater et Augusta ("Mother and Empress"). Factions had already begun to form around the co-emperors when Constantine died of tuberculosis in May and Heraclonas became sole ruler, under the regency of his mother due to his young age. The ongoing Arab conquest of Egypt, Martina's support for monothelitism, and suspicions that Constantine had been poisoned combined to arouse hostility against the government. In October or November 641 the general Valentinus overthrew Heraclonas and replaced him with Constans II, the son of Constantine III. Heraclonas's nose was cut off and he was exiled to Rhodes, where he is believed to have died in the following year.

== Family and historical context ==
Heraclonas was born in 626, in the suburban Palace of Sophianae. He was the son of Emperor Heraclius, and his niece-wife Martina, and was born while Heraclius campaigned in the east against the Persians.

Under Heraclius, the Byzantine Empire was invaded in 639 by the Arabs, due to the failure of the Theme of Mesopotamia to pay tribute. The cities of Edessa and Dara were quickly captured, while another army under 'Amr ibn al-'As occupied the coastal towns of Byzantine Egypt. Stiff resistance by Byzantine forces led by John, the Prefect of Egypt, prevented the invaders from crossing the Nile. After a bloody battle in which John perished, 'Amr was forced to appeal to the Rashidun Caliph Umar for more troops. John was replaced by another general, Theodore, who gathered his forces around Babylon Fortress, a major Egyptian stronghold. By summer 640, 'Amr's forces had swelled to around 15,000 men. With these men, 'Amr decisively defeated Theodore north of Babylon, before laying siege to the fortress itself.

== Life ==
Heraclonas was made caesar by Heraclius on 1 January 632; at a ceremony held on 4 July 638, in the chapel of Saint Stephen at the Palace of Daphne, he was further elevated to augustus (co-emperor), while his younger brother David was made caesar. A description of the ceremony is preserved in De Ceremoniis which says that the kamelaukion (caesar cap) of Heraclonas was removed from his head and replaced with the imperial crown. The same kamelaukion was then placed on David's head.

Heraclius died of edema on 11 February 641, leaving the Empire jointly to his eldest son, Constantine III, and Heraclonas, who were both proclaimed emperor in late May 641. At the time of his elevation to co-emperor, Heraclonas was only 15 years old, whereas Constantine was 28, which effectively gave the real power to Constantine. Much of the Byzantine public objected to Heraclius' will, as Heraclonas was the result of an avunculate marriage—a marriage between an uncle and niece—which many felt was illegal, thereby making Heraclonas a bastard. Also considered objectionable was that Constantine's ten-year-old son, Constans II, was not elevated alongside Constantine and Heraclonas, breaking the tradition of the succession of senior emperorship from father to eldest son, when possible. It was also thought that the lack of elevation could have precluded him from the succession entirely.

Shortly after Constantine took the throne, he was informed by his finance minister, Philagrius, that Heraclius had created a secret fund for Martina, administered by Patriarch Pyrrhus. Constantine confiscated this account, using it to help meet the budget for the spring military payroll, which, along with the traditional accessional donatives that comprised half of the payroll, totaled 2,016,000 nomisma. Constantine appointed Valentinus as the commander of the main eastern army, in the hopes of retaining at least the Egyptian coastline. However the Byzantine general Theodore was still unable to repel the Arab attacks. Constantine summoned Cyrus of Alexandria, made him Prefect of Egypt, and instructed him to prepare to reinforce Alexandria. Before this invasion could take place, Babylon surrendered to the Arabs, allowing them to besiege Alexandria.

Heraclius' will also stated that Martina should serve as mother and empress-regent (sharing significant power), but this part was rejected by the Senate. Because of Heraclonas' young age, Martina ruled through him, consistently opposing the policies of Constantine, leading to the creation of two different political factions. Constantine's faction was initially the more powerful of the two, but this control was weakened by a flagging economy and the loss of Egypt to the Arabs. Shortly after, on 25 May 641, (Note: Constantine's death is sometimes given alternatively as 20 or 24 April. The first date is probably a mistake for 23 April, and it is derived from the 13th-century Chronicon Altinate (edited by Philip Grierson), which gives Heraclius’ death as 11 January. The 23/24 April date is obtained by adding 103 days, the reign-length given by Nikephoros, to 11 January. However, Nikephoros himself places Heraclius' death on 11 February, a date accepted by nearly all scholars. Constantine should have died on 25 May following this same logic. The date is also sometimes given as 24 May (that is, using inclusive counting, though this metod is not used when reckoning Heraclius' death).) Constantine died of an advanced case of tuberculosis, although some supporters of Constantine alleged Martina had him poisoned, leaving Heraclonas as the sole ruler, under the regency of Martina.

=== Sole rule and fall ===
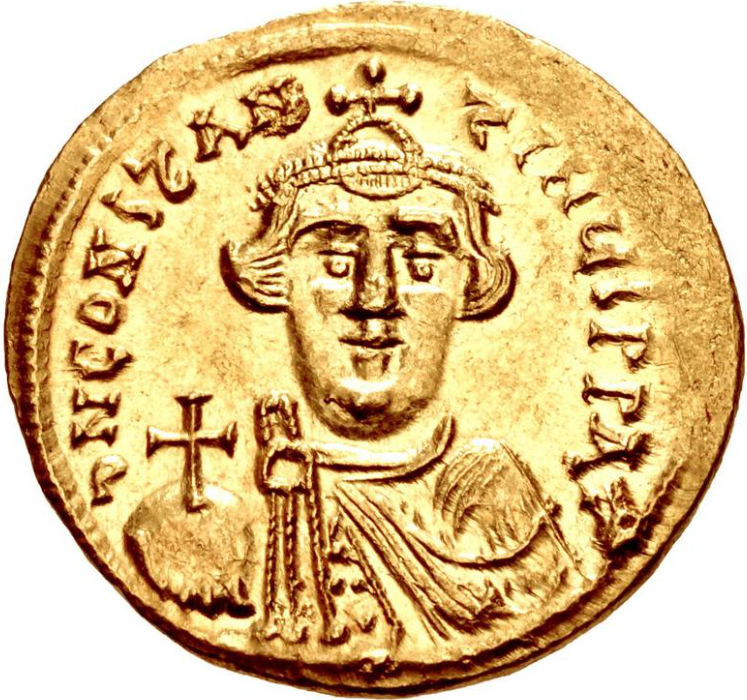
Solidus of Constans II.

Martina maintained the plans of Constantine, and sent Cyrus to Alexandria, with much of the praesental army. She then summoned the Thracian army to Constantinople, to replace them. Around this time, the Patriarch Pyrrhus, an influential advisor of Martina, succeeded in reviving the policy of Monothelitism. As a result of this policy, Kyros, a monothelete, regained control of the see of Alexandria, giving him both religious and secular control. Martina instructed Kyros to attempt to negotiate with the Arabs, as they believed that they were unable to defeat them militarily. Kyros met with 'Amr at the Babylon Fortress and there agreed upon the surrender of Egypt.

Martina was opposed by Valentinus, who was beyond her reach in Anatolia, although she exiled his patron, Philagrius, to Africa. Heraclonas and Martina lost the support of the Byzantine Senate and people due to the rumors that Martina had poisoned Constantine and their support for Monothelitism. Also at this time, both Heraclonas and Martina's relations with the army suffered as a result of Martina's inability to raise enough funds to match the donative given by Constantine.

In August 641, Valentinus marched his troops to Chalcedon, to force Martina to elevate Constans II to co-emperor. While Valentinus was encamped across the Bosphorus from Constantinople, a mob rose up in the city, demanding that Pyrrhus crown Constans II as emperor, and then abdicate, to be replaced by his steward Paul II. Martina, now in a truly desperate situation, offered the military further donatives, recalled Philagrius from Africa, and offered Valentinus the title of Count of the Excubitors. In late September/October, Martina elevated Constans to co-emperor, but also crowned Heraclonas' brother David. Despite these offers, Valentinus entered the city in October/November, (Note: This must have happened some time after the election of Paul on 1 October. Treadgold argued that Heraclonas was deposed on 5 November 641, as attested in the Chronicon Altinate. Stratos favored January 642, but this would require to place Heraclius' death on March 641. Ostrogorsky gives September 641, but he reaches that conclusion by mixing several contradictory accounts. The fall of Martina is usually dated to late 641.) deposed Heraclonas and Martina, and then elevated Constans to emperor. Valentinus was unwilling to kill a woman and child, but had Martina's tongue slit and Heraclonas' nose cut off in January 642, then exiled them to Rhodes; this is believed to be the first time that the political mutilation of Byzantine prisoners was utilized to signify that the person could no longer hold political power. After this, nothing is known of them, although it is believed that Heraclonas died in 642, likely in Rhodes.

== Notes ==
Regnal titles
Preceded by Constantine III, Heraclius	Byzantine emperor 641 with Constantine III (February–March); Constans II (September–November); David Tiberius (October–November)	Succeeded by Constans II
Political offices
Preceded by Heraclius Constantinus Augustus in 631	Roman Consul; 639	Succeeded by Constantinus Augustus in 642
