= 668 =

Calendar year

668 in various calendars
Gregorian calendar	668; DCLXVIII
Ab urbe condita	1421
Armenian calendar	117; ԹՎ ՃԺԷ
Assyrian calendar	5418
Balinese saka calendar	589–590
Bengali calendar	74–75
Berber calendar	1618
Buddhist calendar	1212
Burmese calendar	30
Byzantine calendar	6176–6177
Chinese calendar	丁卯年 (Fire Rabbit); 3365 or 3158 — to — 戊辰年 (Earth Dragon); 3366 or 3159
Coptic calendar	384–385
Discordian calendar	1834
Ethiopian calendar	660–661
Hebrew calendar	4428–4429
- Hindu calendars
Vikram Samvat	724–725
Shaka Samvat	589–590
Kali Yuga	3768–3769
Holocene calendar	10668
Iranian calendar	46–47
Islamic calendar	47–48
Japanese calendar	Hakuchi 19 (白雉１９年)
Javanese calendar	559–560
Julian calendar	668; DCLXVIII
Korean calendar	3001
Minguo calendar	1244 before ROC 民前1244年
Nanakshahi calendar	−800
Seleucid era	979/980 AG
Thai solar calendar	1210–1211
Tibetan calendar	མེ་མོ་ཡོས་ལོ་ (female Fire-Hare); 794 or 413 or −359 — to — ས་ཕོ་འབྲུག་ལོ་ (male Earth-Dragon); 795 or 414 or −358

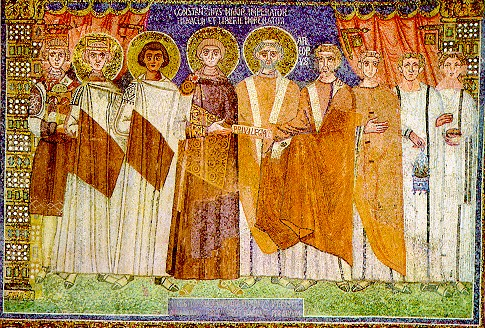
Mosaic panel of Constantine IV (Ravenna)

Year 668 (DCLXVIII) was a leap year starting on Saturday of the Julian calendar. The denomination 668 for this year has been used since the early medieval period, when the Anno Domini calendar era became the prevalent method in Europe for naming years.

== Events ==
=== By place ===
==== Byzantine Empire ====
- July 15 – Emperor Constans II is killed under mysterious circumstances in his bath, during a mutiny at Syracuse. The Byzantine court returns to Constantinople after an absence of 5 years, in which the Muslim-Arabs have made annual invasions and devastations of Anatolia. Probably assassinated by his chamberlain after a 27-year reign, Constans is succeeded by his son Constantine IV (the "Bearded"), alongside his brothers Heraclius and Tiberius as co-emperors.
- Mezezius, Byzantine general and patrikios ("first patrician"), is proclaimed emperor by the army in Syracuse. Constantine IV organizes an expedition to suppress the military revolt in Sicily.

==== Europe ====
- Ebroin, mayor of the palace, becomes de facto ruler of Neustria and (in theory) "of the Franks". According to Bede, he runs the nation's foreign policy and internal security.
- Kotrag, ruler (khagan) of Great Bulgaria, leads the Khazars in overthrowing his brother Batbayan of the Onogurs, and moves south into the Carpathian Mountains.
- Asparukh, leader of the Utigurs, leaves the Ongal area to Kotrag, and leads his people into Moesia in Northern Bulgaria (approximate date).

==== Arabian Empire ====
- Caliph Muawiyah I receives an invitation from Saborios, Byzantine commander of the troops in Armenia, to help overthrow Constantine IV in Constantinople. He sends a Muslim army under his son Yazid, against the Byzantine Empire.
- Yazid reaches Chalcedon in Bithynia, and takes the important Byzantine center Amorium (modern Turkey).
- Arab forces conquer the Garamantes in the Sahara desert (Libya).

==== Asia ====
- Chinese troops sent by the Tang dynasty emperor Gao Zong complete their expedition in the Korean Peninsula. Leaders of the expedition have been selected by the emperor's powerful concubine Wu Zetian. The kingdom of Goguryeo is overthrown; the Unified Silla period starts.
- Emperor Tenji of Japan officially accedes to the throne, and hunts on the Moor of Ōmi-Gamōno. The letters exchanged between prince Ōama and princess Nukata are recorded in Man'yōshū.
- The monk Gyōki, one of the founders of Japanese Buddhism, is born in the Ōtori District of Kawachi Province.

=== By topic ===
==== Religion ====
- Theodore of Tarsus is made archbishop of Canterbury. He introduces a strict Roman parochial system that becomes the model for the secular state.
- Colman of Lindisfarne, accompanied by 30 disciples, sails for Ireland, settling down at Inishbofin and founds a monastery.

== Births ==
- Al-Walid I, Muslim caliph (d. 715)
- Gyōki, Japanese Buddhist priest (d. 749)
- Justinian II, Eastern Roman Emperor (d. 711)

== Deaths ==
- September 15 – Constans II, Byzantine emperor (b. 630)
- Brahmagupta, Indian mathematician and astronomer (b. ca. 598)
- Judoc, Breton noble and Catholic saint (b. 600)
- Saborios, Byzantine general (approximate date)
- Wandregisel, Frankish monk and abbot
- Zhiyan, Chinese (Buddhist) patriarch (b. 602)
