= Heraclius (son of Constantine IV) =

Son of Constantine IV

Heraclius (Greek: Ἡράκλειος) was born between 668 and 685, (Note: At the time of this father's death in 685, his oldest brother was recorded as being 17 years old, meaning that Heraclius was born between 685 and 667.) (Note: Oxbridge Byzantine historian Joan M. Hussey lists: "Heraclius the Heraclid was born circa 670. He was the son of basileus Constantine IV the Heraclian and Anastasia". This would have been circa two years after his older brother Justinian II was born.) and died after 711, was the son, and second of two children, of Byzantine Emperor Constantine IV and his wife, Empress Anastasia.

== Life ==
Unlike his older brother Justinian II, he was never made co-emperor under his father, and was never emperor. In contrast, the brothers of his father, Heraclius and Tiberius, had been crowned Augusti with Constantine IV during the reign of their father Constans II, but in 681 Constantine IV had them mutilated so they would be ineligible to rule.

Heraclius is noted in the Liber Pontificalis under Pope Benedict II who received locks of hair from Justinian and Heraclius ("domni Iustiniani et Heraclii filiorum…principis"), sent by their father, Constantine IV in 684/685. Such a gesture was understood as being a sign of adoption by the Pope of the two children. (Note: German Roman historian Ferdinand Gregorovius noted that: ";certain that it is that he allowed his two sons, Justinian and Heraclius, to be adopted by the Pope, sending to Benedict, according to the curious custom of the time, locks of hair of both princes; symbols of adoption which were solemnly deposited in a chapel of the Lateran.) Heraclius survived his father, but there is no record of him after the death of Constantine IV from dysentery in 685; in contrast, his brother Justinian II's death is known as 711, while his mother Anastasia outlived all her family and died sometime after 711.
