= Constantine IV =

Byzantine emperor from 668 to 685

- Emperor of the Romans
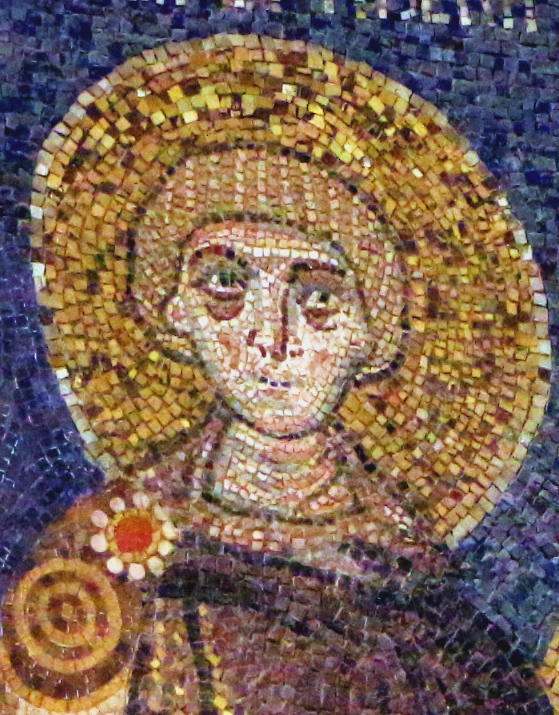
- Constantine IV, mosaic in basilica of Sant'Apollinare in Classe, Ravenna.

Byzantine emperor
- Reign: September 668 – July 685
- Coronation: 13 April 654
- Predecessor: Constans II
- Successor: Justinian II
- Co-emperors: Constans II (654–668); Heraclius (659–681); Tiberius (659–681)
- Born: c. 650; Constantinople (now Istanbul, Turkey)
- Died: 10 July 685 (aged ≈35); Constantinople
- Burial: Church of the Holy Apostles, Constantinople
- Spouse: Anastasia
- Issue: Justinian II; Heraclius
Regnal name
- Latin: Imperator Caesar Flavius Constantinus Augustus; Greek: Αὐτοκράτωρ καῖσαρ Φλάβιος Κωνσταντῖνος αὐγουστος (Note: Constantine and his wife used at least two seals on which his name was rendered as Constantinos Constantos. The name Constantus may have been a patronym, as some modern day historians translate Constantinus Constantus as "Constantine, son of Constans". At least two documents refer to him as "Autokrator Phlabios Konstantinos" (Αὐτοκράτωρ Φλάβιος Κωνσταντῖνος), following the old imperial formula.)
- Dynasty: Heraclian
- Father: Constans II
- Mother: Fausta
- Religion: Chalcedonian Christianity

Saint Constantine the New

Holy and Right-Believing Emperor of the Romans
- Venerated in: Eastern Orthodoxy
- Major shrine: Church of the Holy Apostles
- Feast: 3 September
- Attributes: Imperial attire

Constantine IV (Greek: Κωνσταντῖνος, romanized: Kōnstantīnos; Latin: Constantinus; c. 650 – 10 July 685), called the Younger (Greek: ὁ νέος, romanized: ho Néos) and often incorrectly the Bearded (Greek: Πωγωνᾶτος, romanized: Pōgōnãtos) out of confusion with his father, (Note: The nickname appears prominently in older scholarship, following the chronicles of Symeon Logothete, Kedrenos and Zonaras. This confusion arises from the convoluted nomenclature of the Heraclians: Heraclius (r. 610–641) named his sons Heraclius ("Heraclonas") and Heraclius Constantine ("Constantine III"), who had in turn a son also named Heraclius Constantine ("Constans II"). The emperor Constantine VII (r. 945–959), despite having access to all official documents, uses the name "Constantine Pogonatus" to both Constans II and Constantine IV in different occasions, apparently confusing them.) was Byzantine emperor from 668 to 685. His reign saw the first serious check to nearly 50 years of uninterrupted Arab expansion, most notably his successful defence of Constantinople, and the temporary stabilization of the Byzantine Empire after decades of war, defeats, and civil strife. His calling of the Sixth Ecumenical Council saw the end of the monothelitism controversy in the Byzantine Empire; for this, he is venerated as a saint in the Eastern Orthodox Church, with his feast day on September 3.

== Early career ==
Map of the Byzantine Empire (orange, possessing Anatolia, North Africa, and much of Italy) in 650, showing the Rashidun Caliphate (green, possessing Egypt, the Levant, and much of the Middle East), after the loss of Egypt and other territories to Muslim conquest

The eldest son of Constans II and Fausta, daughter of patrician Valentinus, Constantine IV had been named a co-emperor with his father in 654, almost certainly in Easter (13 April). His year of birth is unknown, but often given as c. 650. (Note: Probably on the basis that most co-emperors were crowned as children. Honorius (384) was 9 years old, Theodosius II (401) was 1 year old, Valentinian III (425) was 6 years old, Leo II (473) was 6 years old, Theodosius (590) was 7 years old, and Constantine III (613) was 1 year old. Tiberius and Constans II (641), were both 11 years old.) He became emperor in September 668, when news arrived at Constantinople that Constans II had been assassinated in Sicily.

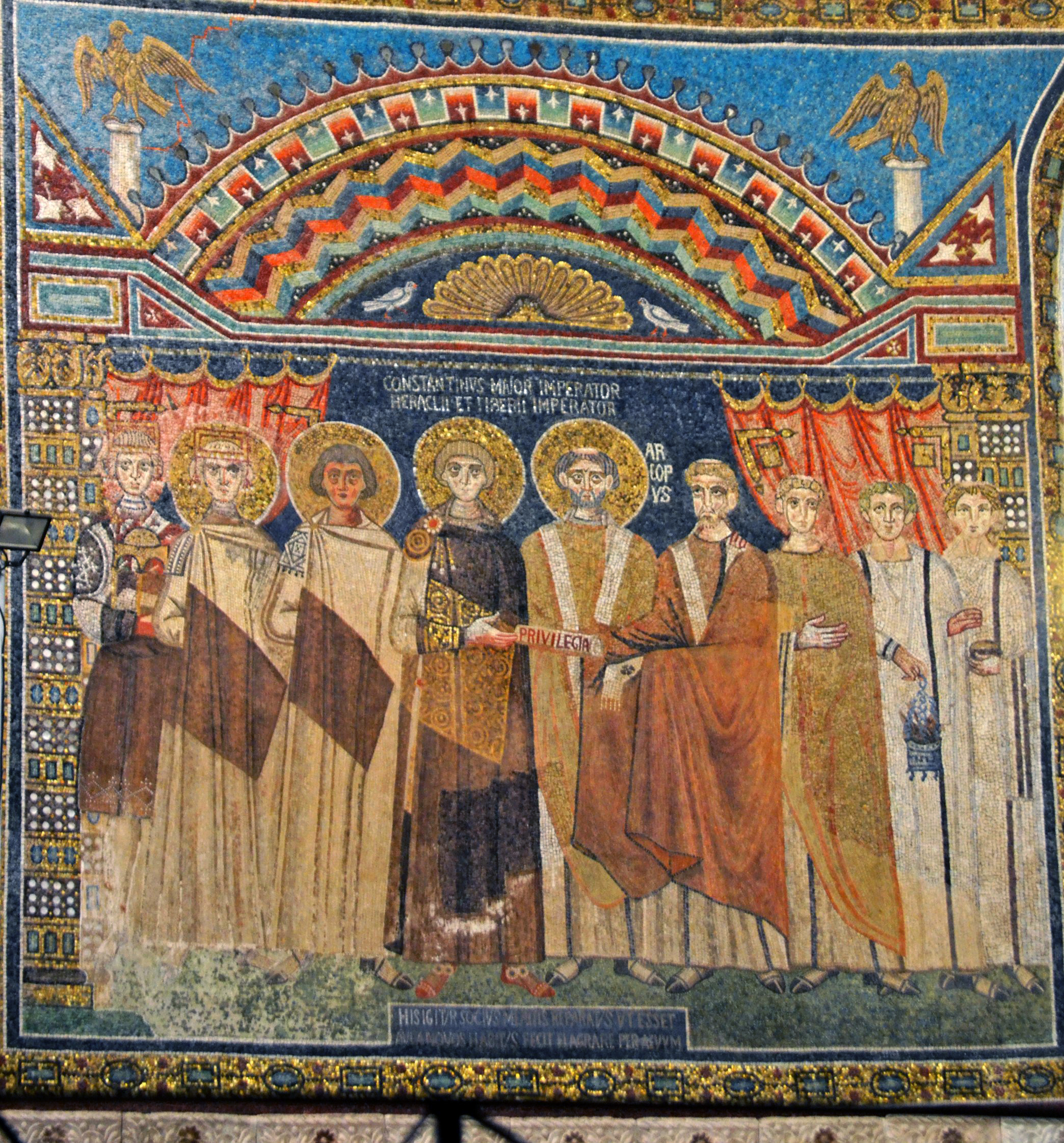
Mosaic of Constantine IV with his family and imperial figures. The upper legend reads: constantinus maior imperator - heraclii et tiberii imperator. (Note: The mosaic must have been made shortly before Heraclius and Tiberius' deposition in 681. Justinian II (far left) is idealized being as tall as them, while in reality he was at least a decade younger and aged between 10–13.)

The first task before the new Emperor was the suppression of the military revolt in Sicily under Mezezius which had led to his father's death. Within seven months of his accession, Constantine IV had dealt with the insurgency with the support of Pope Vitalian, but this success was overshadowed by troubles in the east.

As early as 668 the Caliph Muawiyah I received an invitation from Saborios, the commander of the troops in Armenia, to help overthrow the Emperor at Constantinople. He sent an army under his son Yazid against the Byzantine Empire. Yazid reached Chalcedon and took the important Byzantine center Amorion. While the city was quickly recovered, the Arabs next attacked Carthage and Sicily in 669. In 670 the Arabs captured Cyzicus and set up a base from which to launch further attacks into the heart of the Empire. Their fleet captured Smyrna and other coastal cities in 672. Also, in 672, the Arabs sent a large fleet to attack Constantinople by sea. While Constantine was distracted by this, the Slavs laid siege to Thessalonica.

== The First Arab Siege of Constantinople (667–669) ==
Modern scholarship has re-evaluated the first Arab siege of Constantinople, which has traditionally been dated to 674–678. Recent research suggests that the events more likely occurred between 667 and 669.

In 663, Emperor Constans II relocated the imperial residence to Syracuse, transferring a significant portion of the Byzantine military to Sicily. This move weakened the defenses of Constantinople and left the capital more exposed to Arab attacks. Arab raids into Anatolia had already begun by c. 662 – c. 663, shortly after Muʿāwiya I consolidated his control over the Caliphate following a period of internal conflict. One of these expeditions, led by Busr ibn Abī Artāt, reportedly reached the outskirts of Constantinople and plundered nearby settlements.

During this period, the Byzantine military was unable to repel the incursions effectively. The situation encouraged Saborios, the commander of the Armeniac Theme, to rebel against imperial authority with Arab support. Although Saborios died before his plans were realized, Muʿāwiya proceeded with a large-scale campaign intended to pressure the Byzantine Empire.

In the summer of 667, Muʿāwiya dispatched an army under the command of Fadālah ibn ʿUbayd al-Ansarī towards Constantinople, while a fleet led by his son, Yazīd ibn Muʿāwiya, advanced by sea. The land forces conducted raids across Anatolia and reached Chalcedon by late 667, where they wintered. Yazīd's fleet, composed of Syrian and Egyptian contingents, arrived in the same area by autumn. According to al-Tabarī, several notable figures of early Islam accompanied Yazīd, including ʿAbdallāh ibn ʿAbbās, ʿAbdallāh ibn ʿUmar, ʿAbdallāh ibn al-Zubayr, and Abū Ayyūb al-Anṣārī.

The combined forces blockaded Constantinople but did not attempt a major assault during the winter of 667. Instead, they carried out limited raids in the surrounding countryside. By spring of 668, the siege intensified, lasting through early summer. However, shortages of supplies and an outbreak of disease (reportedly smallpox) caused severe losses among the Arab troops. Yazīd eventually lifted the siege and withdrew. The remaining forces established a base at Cyzicus, from which they continued smaller operations in the region until c. 669 – c. 670, when they finally returned to Syria.

== Succession Crisis and the usurpation of Mizizios (668) ==
The aftermath of the first Arab siege of Constantinople (667–669) coincided with a period of instability within the Byzantine Empire. Emperor Constans II had established his residence in Syracuse several years earlier, leaving the capital under the authority of his son, Constantine IV. When news of the Arab withdrawals from Constantinople failed to reach Sicily, partly due to the continued naval blockade, rumors of the capital's fall spread rapidly.

On 15 July 668, Constans II was assassinated in Syracuse, reportedly by members of his entourage. Following his death, a group of conspirators proclaimed Mizizios, a high-ranking officer in Sicily, as emperor. However, Mizizios gained little support beyond parts of the local army. Pope Vitalian withheld recognition of his rule, and the imperial navy, commanded by the local officer Severus, remained faithful to Constantine. The fleet soon sailed back to Constantinople, restoring naval control of the legitimate emperor.

== Consolidation of Constantine IV's rule ==
By the end of 668, Constantine IV had reasserted his authority in the capital. Possession of the fleet allowed him to defend the city and to neutralize renewed Arab naval threats. To secure the western provinces, he sent his younger brothers and co-emperors to Sicily with additional forces, dividing military responsibilities among them.

Meanwhile, Muʿāwiyah ibn Ḥudayj al-Kindī, governor of Egypt, launched an expedition against Sicily in an attempt to exploit the Byzantine succession crisis. The Arab fleet conducted brief raids on the island, but when Constantine's forces arrived, reportedly with around six hundred ships, the Arabs withdrew without battle. Constantine landed at Syracuse, captured Mizizios, and ordered his execution. The remaining rebels were sent in chains to Constantinople.

== Monetary reforms and imperial propaganda ==
In the aftermath of his father's assassination, Constantine IV faced a severe economic crisis. The relocation of the imperial treasury to Syracuse, combined with losses in Syria and Anatolia, had depleted supplies of precious metals. To stabilize the currency, Constantine reintroduced the heavier copper follis design originally issued under Justinian I, quadrupling its weight and restoring its intrinsic value. This reform also served to undermine any coinage issued by the usurper Mizizios.

When his son was born in 669, Constantine named him Justinian II, signaling a deliberate association with the earlier Justinian dynasty and its ideals of renovatio imperii. The emperor's coinage reforms and imperial imagery reinforced this ideological link. During his reign, the Byzantines gradually regained the initiative against Arab forces, conducting counteroffensives into Egypt and Syria that helped end fifteen years of continuous raids. The death of Muʿāwiya I in 680 marked the close of this turbulent era.

== Later reign ==
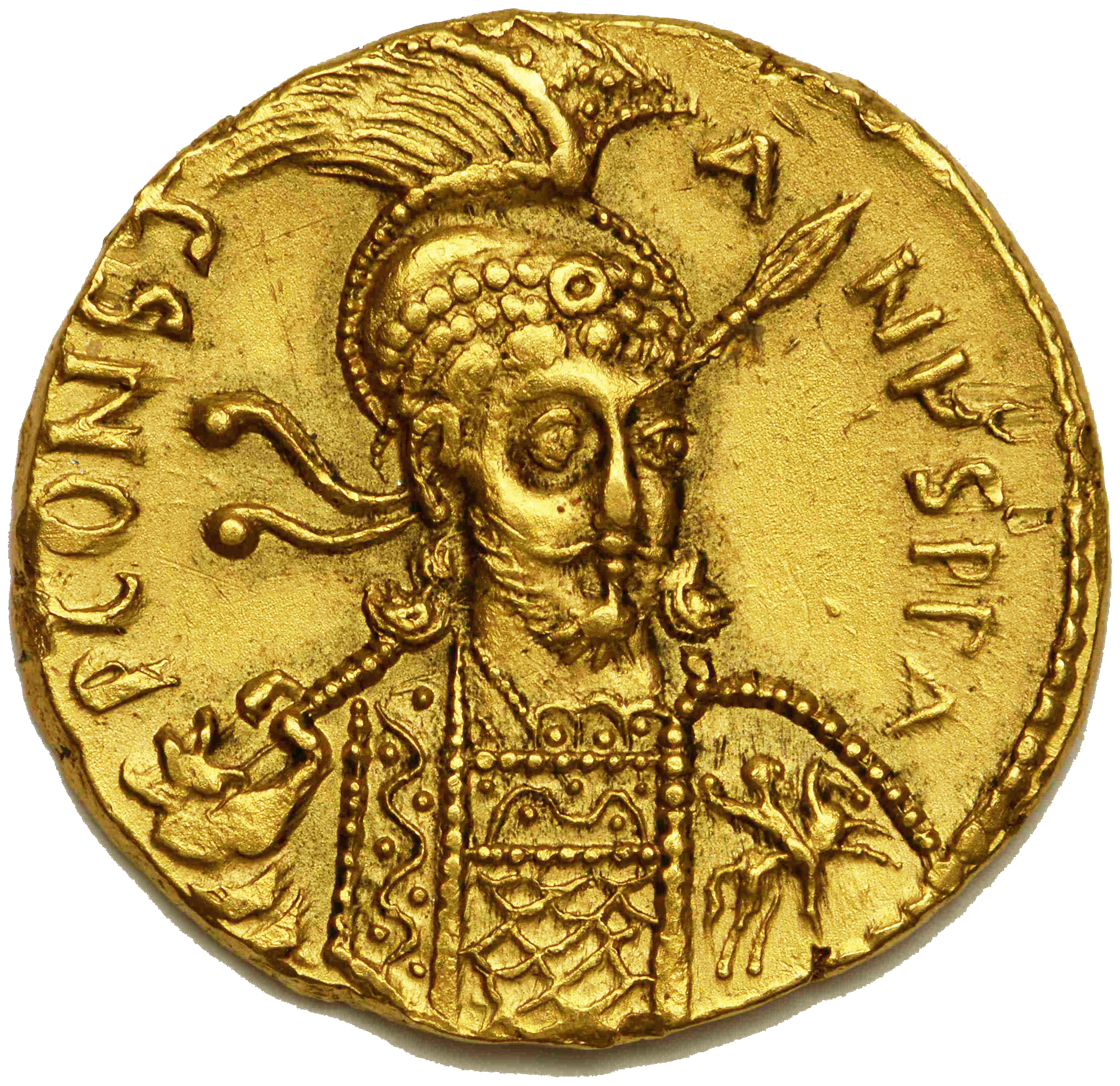
Solidus of Constantine IV, c. 681–685

With the temporary passing of the Arab threat, Constantine turned his attention to the Church, which was torn between Monothelitism and Orthodoxy. In November 680 Constantine convened the Sixth Ecumenical Council (also known as the Third Council of Constantinople). Constantine presided in person during the formal aspects of the proceedings (the first eleven sittings and then the eighteenth), surrounded by his court officials, but he took no active role in the theological discussions. The Council reaffirmed the Orthodox doctrines of the Council of Chalcedon in 451. This solved the controversy over monothelitism; conveniently for the Empire, most monothelites were now under the control of the Umayyad Caliphate. The council closed in September 681.

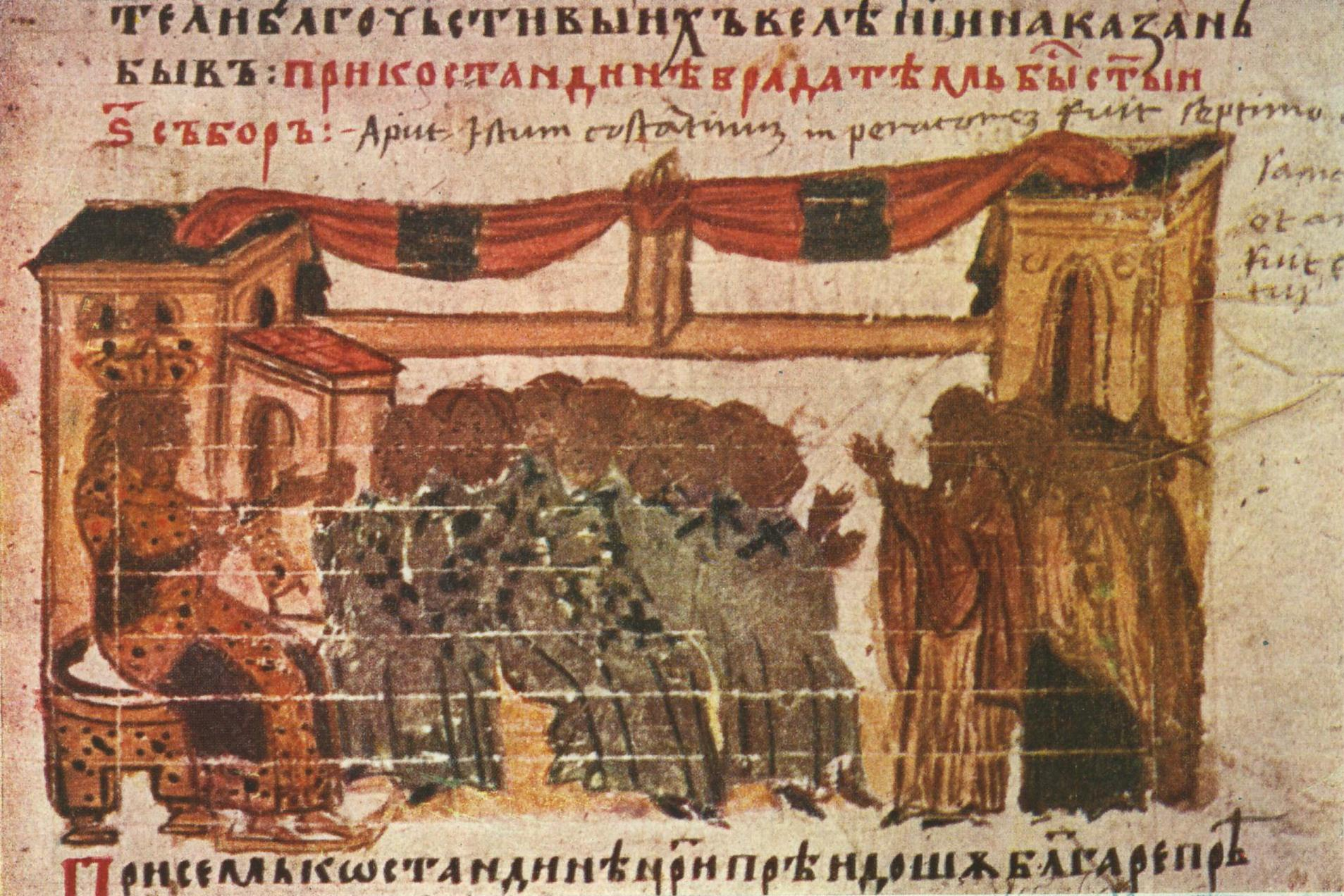
Constantine IV convenes the 3rd Council of Constantinople, miniature from the 12th century Manasses Chronicle.

Due to the ongoing conflicts with the Arabs during the 670s, Constantine had been forced to conclude treaties in the west with the Lombards, who had captured Brindisi and Taranto. Also in 680, the Bulgars under Khan Asparukh crossed the Danube into nominally Imperial territory and began to subjugate the local communities and Slavic tribes. In 680, Constantine IV led a combined land and sea operation against the invaders and besieged their fortified camp in Dobruja. Suffering from bad health, the Emperor had to leave the army, which panicked and was defeated by the Bulgars. In 681, Constantine was forced to acknowledge the Bulgar state in Moesia and to pay tribute/protection money to avoid further inroads into Byzantine Thrace. Consequently, Constantine created the Theme of Thrace.

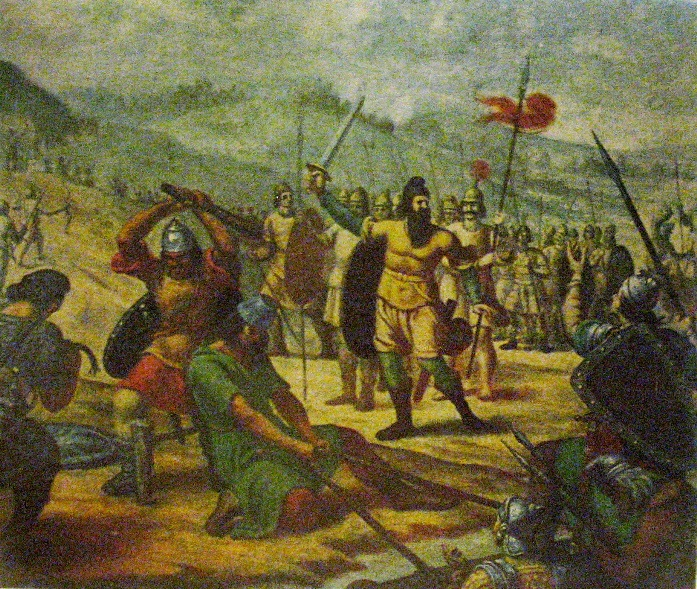
Khan Asparukh crosses the Danube and settles in Moesia, by Nikolai Pavlovich (ca. 19th century).

His brothers Heraclius and Tiberius had been crowned with him as augusti during the reign of their father, and this was confirmed by the demand of the populace, but in late 681 Constantine had them mutilated by slitting their noses so they would be considered ineligible to rule. Some argue that he then associated Justinian II to the throne, but all contemporary evidence indicates that he became emperor only after Constantine's death on 10 July 685. (Note: "Constantine's death is usually placed in September 685 on the ground that the sources attribute to him a reign of 17 years... Since such a figure can be taken only as a round number, there is no objection to accepting the date 10 July given the Catalogus.")

Constantine IV died of dysentery on 10 July 685.

== Family ==
By his wife Anastasia, Constantine IV had at least two sons:

- Justinian II in 669, who succeeded him as emperor at the age of sixteen.
- Heraclius c. 670, known only from an episode in which his father sent locks of his and his brother's hair to Pope Benedict II.

== In art and popular culture ==
- Constantine IV was portrayed by Iossif Surchadzhiev in the 1981 Bulgarian movie Aszparuh, directed by Ludmil Staikov.
- Constantine IV is the subject of the song "Imperator" ("Emperor"), released by the Bulgarian heavy metal band Epizod in their 2012 album Moyata molitva ("My prayer").

== See also ==
- List of Byzantine emperors

== Sources ==
=== Primary sources ===
- Theophanes (1997) [c. 820]. Chronographia. Translated by Mango, Cyril. Oxford University Press. ISBN 9780198225683.

=== Secondary sources ===
- Bury, John Bagnell (1889). A History of the Later Roman Empire from Arcadius to Irene (395 A. D. to 800 A.D.). Vol. II. Macmillan and Co.
- Garland, Lynda (2000). "Anastasia (Wife of Constantine IV)". De Imperatoribus Romanis. (Archive)
- Gibbon, Edward (1827). The History of the Decline and Fall of the Roman Empire. Vol. 6. Oxford: William Pickering.
- Grierson, Philip (1962). "The Tombs and Obits of the Byzantine Emperors". Dumbarton Oaks Papers. 16. doi:10.2307/1291157. ISSN 0070-7546. JSTOR 1291157.
- Grierson, Philip (1968). Catalogue of the Byzantine Coins in the Dumbarton Oaks Collection. Vol. 2. Dumbarton Oaks. ISBN 9780884020240.
- Grumel, Venance (1968). "Quel est l'empereur Constantin le nouveau commémoré dans le Synaxaire au 3 septembre?". Analecta Bollandiana. 84 (1–2): 254–260. doi:10.1484/J.ABOL.4.02605. ISSN 2507-0290. JSTOR 44169223.
- Kazhdan, Alexander, ed. (1991), Oxford Dictionary of Byzantium, Oxford University Press, ISBN 978-0-19-504652-6

Laurent, V. (1939). "Notes de titulature byzantine". Échos d'Orient. 38 (195–196): 355–370. doi:10.3406/rebyz.1939.2941.

- Meyendorff, John (1989). Imperial unity and Christian divisions. The Church in history. Vol. 2. Crestwood, NY: St. Vladimir's Seminary Press. ISBN 978-0-88-141056-3.
- Moore, R. Scott (1997). "Constantine IV (668-685 A.D.)". De Imperatoribus Romanis. Archived from the original on 28 February 2018.()
- Norwich, John Julius (1990), Byzantium: The Early Centuries, Penguin, ISBN 0-14-011447-5
- Ostrogorsky, George (1956). History of the Byzantine State. Oxford: Basil Blackwell.
- Settipani, Christian (2006). Continuité des élites à Byzance durant les siècles obscurs: les princes caucasiens et l'empire du VIe au IXe siècle. Paris: De Boccard.
- Zuckerman, C. (1995). "A Gothia in the Hellespont in the Early Eighth Century". Byzantine and Modern Greek Studies. 19 (1): 234–242. doi:10.1179/030701395790836649. S2CID 162205022.
- Jankowiak, M. (2013). "The First Arab Siege of Constantinople", Travaux et Mémoires 17, 237–322.

Constantine IV Heraclian Dynasty Born: 650 Died: 685
Regnal titles
Preceded by Constans II	Byzantine emperor 668–685 with Constans II, 654–668; Heraclius and Tiberius, 659–681	Succeeded by Justinian II
Political offices
Preceded by Constans II in 642, then lapsed	Roman consul 668	Succeeded by Lapsed, Justinian II in 686
