= Martinus (son of Heraclius) =

Byzantine caesar from c. 639 to 641

Caesar of the Byzantine Empire
- Reign: c. 639 – September or October 641
- Predecessor: Heraclonas
- Successor: Constans II
- Co-rulers: Heraclonas; David Tiberius; Constans II (all in 641)
- Died: Possibly in 641
- Dynasty: Heraclian
- Father: Heraclius
- Mother: Martina

Martinus (Greek: Μαρτίνος, romanized: Martínos) or Marinus (Greek: Μαρίνος, romanized: Marínos; died possibly in 641) was caesar of the Byzantine Empire from c. 639 to 641. Martinus was the fifth son of Emperor Heraclius and Empress Martina, who was Heraclius' second wife and niece. Martinus was elevated to caesar, a junior imperial title that placed him on the line of succession, at some point between 638 and 640 by his father.

Heraclius died on 11 February 641, leaving the Byzantine Empire to Martinus's half-brother Constantine III and his elder full brother Heraclonas; Constantine III soon died of tuberculosis, although some of his partisans alleged that Martina poisoned him. One such partisan, Valentinus, led troops to Chalcedon, across the Bosporus strait from the imperial capital, Constantinople, to force Martina to install Constans II, the son of Constantine III, as co-emperor. Valentinus seized Constantinople and forced Martina to install Constans II in September or October 641, and deposed Martina, Heraclonas, and Martinus. Martinus was mutilated and exiled to Rhodes. He died soon after, possibly during or immediately after the mutilations.

== Life ==
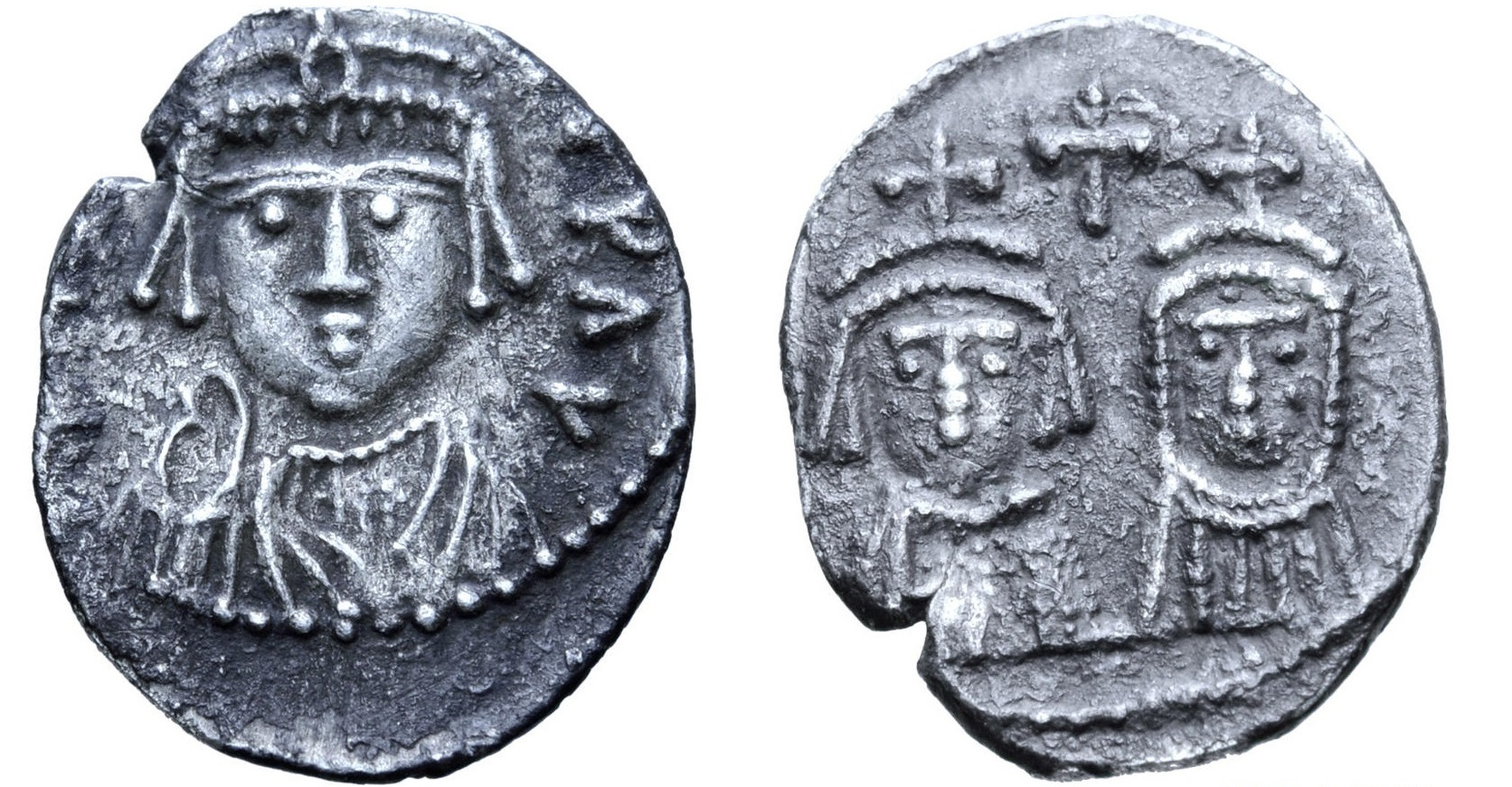
Coin of 616, depicting Martinus's father Heraclius, his half-brother Constantine III, and his mother Martina

Martinus was born to Byzantine Emperor Heraclius and Empress Martina, Heraclius's niece and second wife, at an unknown date; he was likely named after his mother. Prior to taking the throne in 610, Heraclius had been married to Fabia Eudokia, with whom he had had a daughter, Eudoxia Epiphania, and a son, Constantine III. After she died in 612, to further secure the succession, Heraclius remarried, wedding his niece Martina in either 613 or 623, with the latter date considered more likely. Although this marriage was very unpopular and offended the clergy, it was very fruitful. The number and order of Heraclius's children by Martina is unsure, with sources estimating nine, ten, or eleven children. Their first two sons were disabled and therefore unable to inherit, but Heraclonas was born healthy in 626, David Tiberius in 630, and Martinus at some later time. Constantine III was raised to co-emperor in 613 (aged 9 months), and Heraclonas in 638 (aged 12 years).

Martinus received the high courtly title nobilissimus under Heraclius, while his elder brother David was made caesar (a junior imperial title which placed him on the line of succession) on 4 July 638. According to the Byzantine historian Nicephorus Gregoras, Martinus was also made caesar on the same day, but the later historian Emperor Constantine VII mentions only Tiberius. A partially preserved papyrus letter known as SB VI 8986, and another papyrus document, CPR XXIII 35, shows that Martinus was definitely promoted to caesar at some point between 639 and 640, although the exact dating is debated: the German papyrologist who restored SB VI 8986, Fritz Mitthof, and the Byzantine historian Nikolaos Gonis argue for a date range between October 639 and September 640, whereas Byzantine scholar Constantin Zuckerman argues for a range between 4 January 639 and 8 November 639.

According to the 7th-century historian John of Nikiu, Martinus and his brother David were involved in the banishment of Ecumenical Patriarch Pyrrhus of Constantinople (r. 638–641) to the Exarchate of Africa. However, the two princes were too young at the time to have taken an active role in any banishment and the account by John of Nikiu is so contradictory that no safe conclusions can be drawn from it.

=== Reign of Constantine III and Heraclonas ===
Map of the Byzantine Empire in 650, after the loss of Egypt and other territories to Muslim conquest

When Heraclius died on 11 February 641, he declared in his will that Constantine III (aged 28) and Heraclonas (aged 15) would equally co-rule the empire, but should consider Martina as their mother, and empress. The Byzantine Senate accepted Constantine III and Heraclonas as co-emperors, but rejected Martina as regent for Heraclonas. On 20/24 April or 26 May 641, Constantine died of an advanced case of tuberculosis. However, some of his supporters alleged that Martina had him poisoned, leaving her son Heraclonas as the sole ruler under her regency. In August 641, Valentinus, a general who had been loyal to Constantine before his death, led his troops to Chalcedon to force Martina to elevate Constans II, the son of Constantine, to co-emperor. A mob rose up in the city, demanding that Patriarch Pyrrhus crown Constans II as emperor, and then abdicate, to be replaced by his steward Paul II (r. 641–653). Martina, now in a truly desperate situation, offered the military further donatives (monetary gifts to the army to secure their loyalty), and attempted to negotiate with Valentinus, recalling an influential patron of his, Philagrius, from exile in Africa, and offering him the title of comes excubitorum (a very influential post that entailed command over the imperial bodyguard).

=== Valentinus's revolt and Martinus's death ===
In late September or October, Martina elevated Constans to co-emperor, but also raised Heraclonas's brother Tiberius to co-emperor alongside them. Despite these overtures, Valentinus entered Constantinople shortly thereafter, deposed Heraclonas and Martina, and then elevated Constans to sole emperor. Heraclonas, Martina, Tiberius, and Martinus are said by John of Nikiu to have been "escorted forth with insolence". Valentinus had Martinus's nose cut off, emasculated him, and then banished him and his family to Rhodes, where they remained until their deaths. According to some sources, these mutilations either killed Martinus immediately or soon afterwards.

== Primary sources ==
- Chronicle of John of Nikiû
- CPR XXIII 35
- De Ceremoniis
- SB VI 8986

Regnal titles
Preceded by Heraclonas	Caesar of the Byzantine Empire c. 639 – September or October 641 with David Tiberias (4 July 638 – November 641)	Succeeded by Constans II
