= Tiberius (son of Constans II) =

Byzantine co-emperor from 659–681

- Augustus
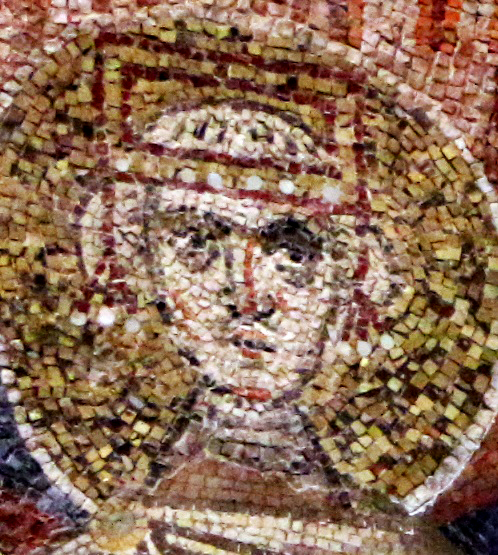
- Tiberius, mosaic in basilica of Sant'Apollinare in Classe, Ravenna.

Byzantine co-emperor
- Reign: 659–681 (22 years)
- Coronation: 2 June 659
- Predecessor: Constans II
- Successor: Constantine IV
- Co-emperors: Heraclius; Constans II; Constantine IV
- Born: Constantinople (now Istanbul, Turkey)
- Dynasty: Heraclian
- Father: Constans II
- Mother: Fausta
- Religion: Christianity

Tiberius (Greek: Τιβέριος, romanized: Tibérios) was Byzantine co-emperor from 659 to 681. He was the son of Constans II and Fausta, who was elevated in 659, before his father departed for Italy. After the death of Constans, Tiberius' brother Constantine IV, ascended the throne as senior emperor. Constantine attempted to have both Tiberius and Heraclius removed as co-emperors, which sparked a popular revolt, in 681. Constantine ended the revolt by promising to accede to the demands of the rebels, sending them home, but bringing their leaders into Constantinople. Once there, Constantine had them executed, then imprisoned Tiberius and Heraclius and had them mutilated, after which point they disappear from history.

== Life ==
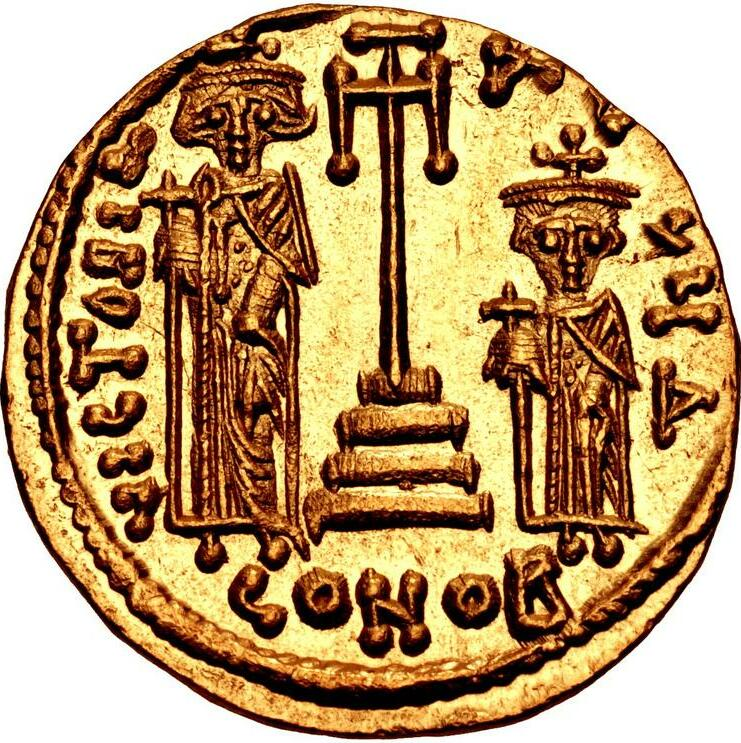
Tiberius and Heraclius on the reverse of a solidus.

Tiberius was the youngest son of Constans II. His mother was Fausta, daughter of the Patrician Valentinus. Although his eldest brother Constantine IV had been raised to the rank of co-emperor in 654, in 659, shortly before his father's departure for Italy, Tiberius was also elevated by Constans to the rank of co-emperor, alongside his older brother Heraclius. The coronation ceremony took place between 27 April and 9 August. Given that most coronations took place in festive days, it's very likely that this one took place on Whitsunday (2 June). In 663, Constans tried to have his sons join him in Sicily, but this provoked a popular uprising in Constantinople, led by Theodore of Koloneia and Andrew, and the brothers remained in the imperial capital.

With Constans II's death in 668, Constantine IV became the senior emperor. After ruling alongside Tiberius and Heraclius for thirteen years, Constantine attempted to demote his brothers from the imperial position, but this provoked a military revolt in the Anatolic Theme (in modern Turkey). The army marched to Chrysopolis, and sent a delegation across the straits of the Hellespont to Constantinople, demanding that the two brothers should remain co-emperors alongside Constantine IV. They based their demand on the belief that, since Heaven was ruled by the Trinity, in the same way the empire should be governed by three Emperors. Confronted by this situation, Constantine kept a close eye on his brothers, and sent across a trusted officer, Theodore, the captain of Koloneia. Constantine gave Theodore the delicate task of praising the soldiers for their devotion and agreeing with their reasoning, with the objective of persuading them to return to their barracks in Anatolia. He also invited the leaders of the rebellion to come over to Constantinople and consult with the Senate in order that they may begin the process of confirming the army's wishes. Happy with this apparently positive outcome, the army departed back to Anatolia, while the instigators of the movement entered the city. With the military threat now gone, Constantine moved against the leaders of the revolt, captured them and had them hanged at Sycae.

Because he was the focus of a plot to curtail Constantine's power, both he and his brother were now suspect in the senior emperor's eyes; also, the emperor was keen to raise up his own son, the future Justinian II. Sometime between 16 September and 21 December 681, Constantine ordered the mutilation of his brothers by slitting their noses, and ordered that their images no longer appear on any coinage, and that their names be removed from all official documentation; likely to ensure that his son, Justinian II would, succeed him. After this point, neither are mentioned again in the historical record.

== Bibliography ==
- Bury, J.B. (1889), A History of the Later Roman Empire from Arcadius to Irene, Vol. II, MacMillan & Co., OCLC 168739195
- Grierson, Philip (1968). Catalogue of the Byzantine coins in the Dumbarton Oaks Collection and in the Whittemore Collection. Vol. 2. Dumbarton Oaks. ISBN 978-0-88402-024-0. OCLC 847177622.
- Haldon, John (2016). The Empire That Would Not Die. Harvard University Press. ISBN 9780674088771.
- Hoyland, Robert G. (2012). Theophilus of Edessa's Chronicle and the circulation of historical knowledge in late antiquity and early Islam. Liverpool University Press. ISBN 978-1846316975.
- Kazhdan, Alexander, ed. (1991), Oxford Dictionary of Byzantium, Oxford University Press, ISBN 978-0-19-504652-6
- Lilie, Ralph-Johannes (2013). Winkelmanns, Friedhelm; Ludwig, Claudia; Pratsch, Thomas; Zielke, Beate (eds.). Prosopographie der mittelbyzantinischen Zeit Online. Walter de Gruyter. OCLC 913120464.
- Moore, R. Scott (1997). "Constantine IV (668–685 A.D.)". De Imperatoribus Romanis. Archived from the original on 28 February 2018.
- Stratos, Andreas Nikolaos (1980). Byzantium in the Seventh Century: 634–641. A.M. Hakkert. OCLC 490722634.
- Oaks, Dumbarton (1968). Catalogue of the Byzantine coins in the Dumbarton Oaks Collection and in the Whittemore Collection. Dumbarton Oaks. OCLC 847177622.
- Winkelmann, Friedhelm; Lilie, Ralph-Johannes, eds. (2001), Prosopographie der mittelbyzantinischen Zeit: I. Abteilung (641–867) – 5. Band: Theophylaktos (#8346) – az-Zubair (#8675), Anonymi (#10001–12149) (in German), Walter de Gruyter, ISBN 978-3-11-016675-0
