= Saburrus =

Saburrus (fl. 663) was a Byzantine military leader of Persian descent who served under Emperor Constans II (r. 641–668). He commanded a force of 20,000 soldiers in an operation against the Lombard Duchy of Benevento, but after suffering defeat at Forino, he retreated to Naples. His name appears only in the History of the Lombards by Paul the Deacon and is likely a variation of the Greek names Σαπώρης, Σαβώριος, or Σαβόριος, all of which are derived from the Middle Persian Shābuhr—from which the New Persian Shapur (شاپور) originates.

== Sources ==
- Shukurov, Rustam (2023a). "Speaking Persian in Byzantium". Journal of Late Antique, Islamic and Byzantine Studies. 2 (1–2): 202–214. doi:10.3366/jlaibs.2023.0020.
- Shukurov, Rustam (2023b). Byzantine Ideas of Persia, 650–1461. Routledge. doi:10.4324/9781003205197. ISBN 9781003205197.
