= David (son of Heraclius) =

Byzantine co-emperor in 641 CE

Tiberius
- Emperor of the Romans

Byzantine emperor
- Augustus: September/October – November 641
- Predecessor: Heraclonas
- Successor: Constans II
- Co-emperors: Heraclonas and Constans II
- Caesar: 4 July 638 – September/October 641
- Born: David; 7 November 630
Regnal name
- Tiberius
- Dynasty: Heraclian
- Father: Heraclius
- Mother: Martina
- Religion: Chalcedonian Christianity

David (Greek: Δαυίδ; fl. 630–641) was one of three co-emperors of Byzantium for a few months in late 641, and had the regnal name Tiberius. David was the son of Emperor Heraclius and his wife and niece Empress Martina. He was born after the emperor and empress had visited Jerusalem and his given name reflects a deliberate attempt to link the imperial family with the Biblical David. The David Plates, which depict the life of King David, may likewise have been created for the young prince or to commemorate his birth. David was given the senior court title caesar in 638, in a ceremony during which he received the kamelaukion cap previously worn by his older brother Heraclonas.

After the death of Emperor Heraclius in February 641, when David was 10 years old, a power struggle ensued between different branches of the imperial family. As part of a compromise, David was raised to be co-emperor, ruling with his brother Heraclonas and their nephew Constans II. The Byzantine state faced serious challenges while Tiberius was co-emperor, with the ongoing Muslim conquest of Egypt and continuing religious strife over monothelitism and other Christological doctrines. All three emperors were children and the Empress Dowager Martina acted as regent. Martina was deeply unpopular due to her incestuous relationship with Heraclius, her unconventional habits, and her ambition. Her regime was deposed in a rebellion, probably by January 642. She and her sons were exiled to Rhodes and, in an early example of Byzantine political mutilation, Martina's tongue was cut out and the noses of her sons were cut off. There is no further historical record of Tiberius, and some historians speculate that he and his family lived out the rest of their lives peacefully.

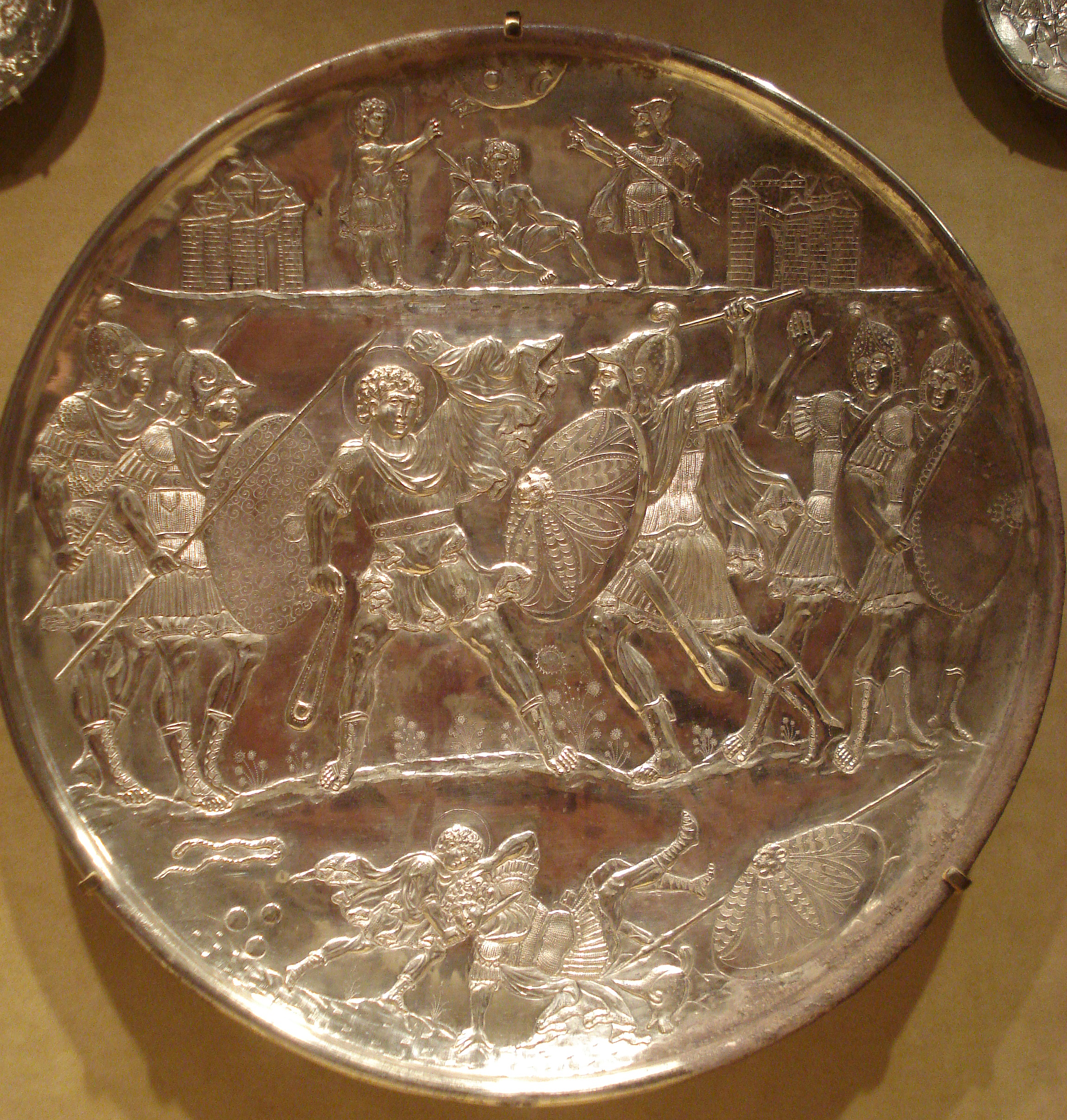
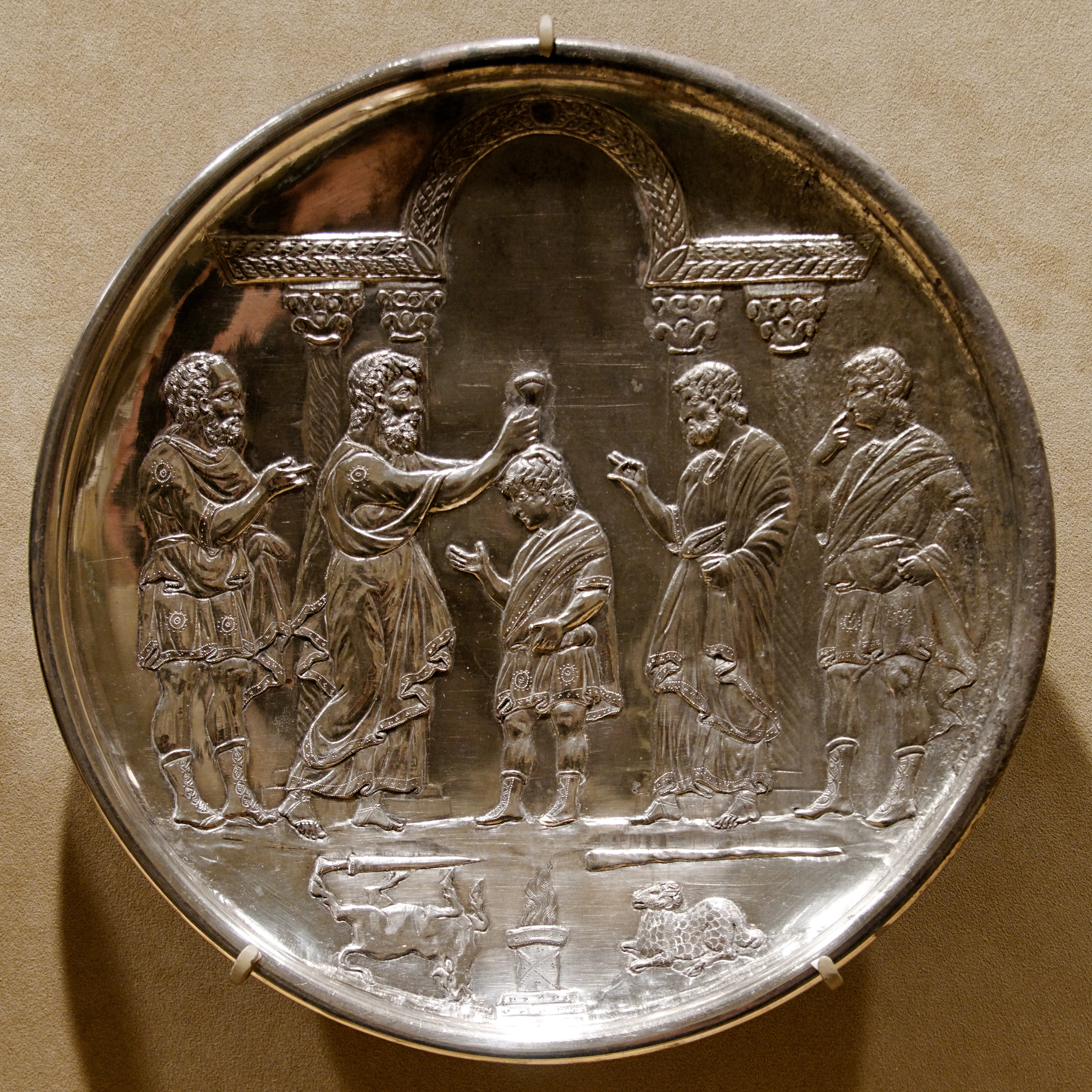
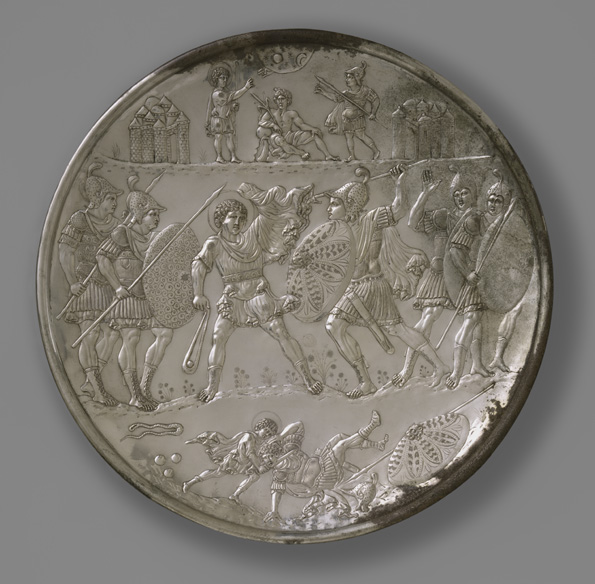
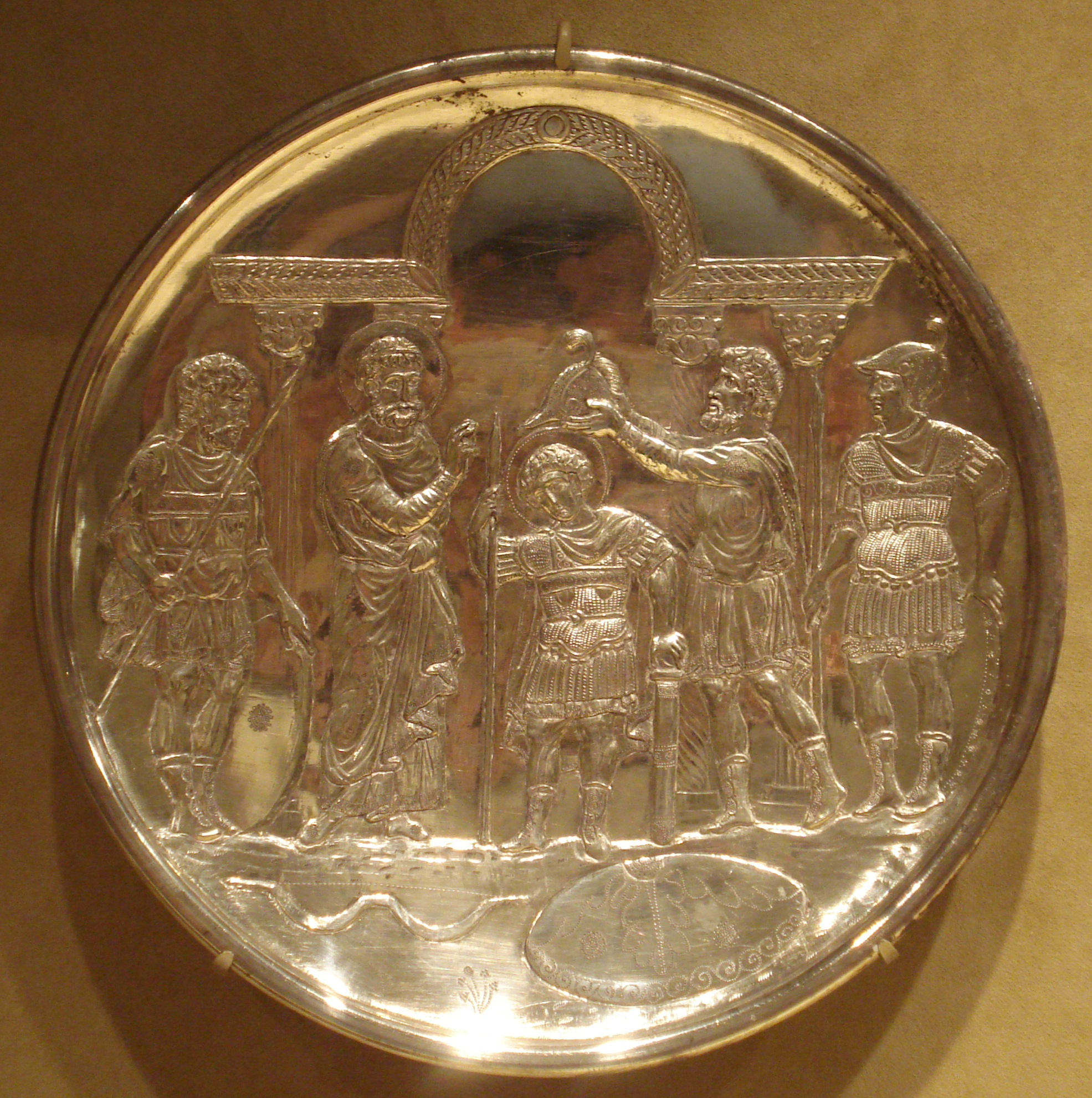
Four of the David Plates depict (clockwise) David's being summoned by the prophet Samuel, being anointed by him, receiving Saul's armor, and battling Goliath. From the collection of the Metropolitan Museum of Art, New York.

== Under the reign of Heraclius ==
David was the son of Byzantine Emperor Heraclius and Empress Martina, his wife and niece. According to the Chronicle of Theophanes the Confessor, David was born on 7 November, 630, the same day as his nephew Constans II. Earlier that year, David's parents had been in Jerusalem with David in utero. While his siblings received traditional dynastic names, that of David seems to have been chosen deliberately for symbolic value out of a desire to link the imperial family with the Biblical David. Byzantine art historian Cecily Hennessy points out that the birth of David occurred after several children of Heraclius and Martina had been born malformed or died in infancy. The occasion may have been a cause for commemoration. Heraclius had a set of silver plates known as the David Plates created, most likely in either 629 or 630. Hennessy suggests that since the plates present iconography of the Biblical David as a boy, they may have been "made for the young prince David". Heraclius had produced two children by Fabia Eudokia (Eudoxia Epiphania and Emperor Constantine III) and at least nine with Martina, most of whom were sickly, and four of whom died in infancy. (Note: The number and order of Heraclius's children by Martina is unsure, some sources saying nine children and others ten.)

David was made caesar under Heraclius on 4 July 638, (Note: John Haldon gives the date as 7 July 638.) elevated from his previous status of despotes (an honorific usually reserved for sons of the reigning emperor), while his older brother Heraclonas was promoted from caesar to co-emperor. The ceremony took place in the chapel of Saint Stephen at the Palace of Daphne. A description of the ceremony is preserved in De Ceremoniis which says that the kamelaukion (caesar cap) of Heraclonas was removed from his head and replaced with the imperial crown. The same kamelaukion was then placed on David's head and the ceremony proceeded as follows in a translation by Byzantine scholar Walter Kaegi:

There was prayer for the despotes David as the kamelaukion was placed on his head as he ascended to the rank of Caesar. That having been done, the most glorious Patricians were summoned according to custom, and they entered the Augusteum and received the great emperor and his sons, the Caesar being present. All ex-consuls and those with ranks as high as illustres departed and stood on the steps of the forecourt. The gates of the armory were opened and all of the standards (signa) and scholae and demes [factions] entered. The Patriarch exited with them [the emperor and his sons]. And with everyone acclaiming them, the emperor and his sons departed for the Great Church.

Kaegi notes that this solemn celebration papered over tensions between branches of the imperial family and also served as an occasion for "pageantry at Constantinople in an otherwise doleful era". The Byzantine scholar Andreas Stratos emphasizes that the measures were intended to ensure a regular line of succession for the family of Heraclius. The high number of titled princes under Heraclius had not been seen since the days of Constantine the Great.

At a later ceremony focused on Heraclius's daughters as well as his sons, David was hailed by name along with other members of the imperial family, David Caesar, tu vincas, literally "David Caesar, may you be victorious". The Latin phrase tu vincas in the Greek text is an echo of Roman heritage and earlier times. Kaegi comments that "Heraclius and his family made a point of showing themselves to their subjects in ways that matched public expectations even as illness and age was taking its toll on Heraclius himself."

== Succession struggle ==
Heraclius died on 11 February 641. His will declared that Constantine III and Heraclonas would co-rule the empire with both of them regarding Martina as "mother and empress". Popular opinion in Byzantium was strongly against Martina because of her incestuous relationship with Heraclius, her unconventional habits, such as the fact she often traveled with the army, and her ambition; the populace and elites of the Byzantine Empire believed she was putting pressure on Heraclius in an attempt to have her own sons secure the succession, rather than Constantine.

Historian Lynda Garland has described Martina as "probably the most detested empress of all time". The Byzantine Senate accepted Constantine III and Heraclonas as co-emperors, but rejected any role for Martina in the government. Emperor Constantine III was chronically ill and took measures to ensure that he would be succeeded by his own offspring rather than those of Martina. He sent a vast sum of money to general Valentinus, asking him to oppose Martina and her children and ensure the succession for his own sons. Constantine died after a short reign, in April or May 641. His cause of death was likely tuberculosis, but the accusation that Martina poisoned him was later officially propagated, by Constans II. At this point, an eleven-year-old Heraclonas was left as the sole emperor with his mother as regent and de facto ruler.

Martina took measures to mitigate the hostility of the army, but her regime remained deeply unpopular. In the autumn of 641 Valentinus led his troops to Chalcedon in opposition to Martina and Heraclonas. A mob rose up in Constantinople, demanding that Constans II be crowned as emperor. Heraclonas agreed and crowned his nephew. The coronation of Constans II did not calm the riots in Constantinople which next led to Patriarch Pyrrhus resigning his office. According to John of Nikiû, David and his younger brother Martinus were involved in banishing Pyrrhus to the Exarchate of Africa. However, the two princes were too young at the time to have taken an active role in any banishment, and the account by John of Nikiû is so contradictory that no safe conclusions can be drawn from it.

Martina was in a difficult situation and resorted to negotiations with Valentinus, whose army was still in Chalcedon. She offered the military donatives (monetary gifts given to the army to secure their loyalty), and offered Valentinus the title of Count of the Excubitors. As part of a compromise, David was raised to co-emperor with the regnal name Tiberius, ruling with his brother Heraclonas and their nephew Constans II. All three emperors were children, and the Empress Dowager Martina acted as regent.

== Tiberius as co-emperor ==
The coronation of David took place in late September or early October of 641, the new emperor being a ten-year-old boy. David assumed the name Tiberius upon his coronation. The adoption of one of the traditional regnal names was common among seventh- and eighth-century Byzantine emperors: other examples include Apsimarus/Tiberius III (698), Bardanes/Philippicus (711), Artemius/Anastasius (713), Basilius/Tiberius (718), and Petasius/Tiberius (728).

The most important primary source for the period preceding the reign of Tiberius is Nicephorus, but that account breaks off as Tiberius is crowned, leaving his short reign attested only by sparse and contradictory sources. One dubious source is the Synodicon Vetus, where Tiberius is attested as the recipient of a papal letter:

In addition, the thrice-blessed Pope John of Rome – for he had succeeded the monothelete Honorius – assembled a divine and sacred synod and, anathematizing Sergius, Cyrus, and Pyrrhus, proclaimed two natures and energies in our Master and God Jesus Christ, and afterward he sent a decree of orthodoxy to David and Heraclius, the sons of Heraclius.

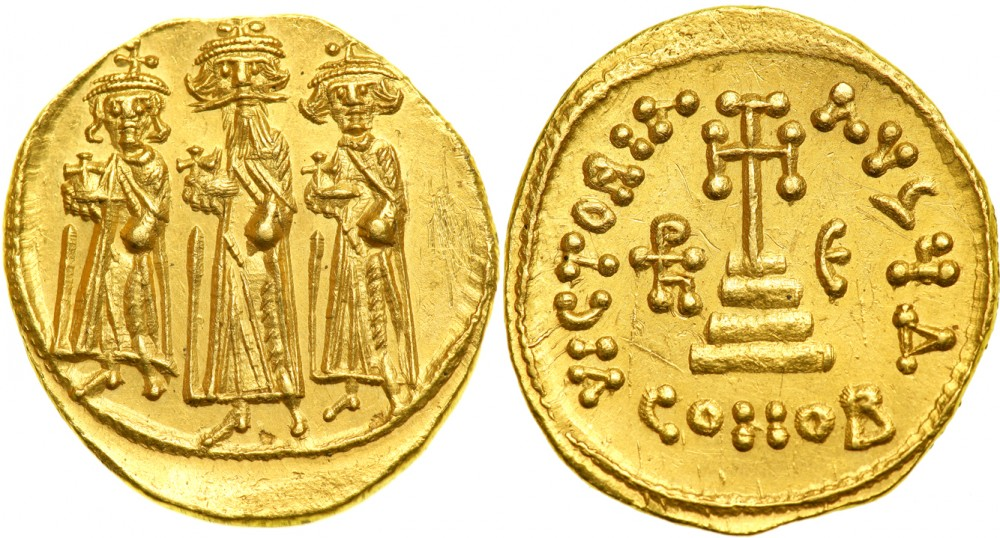
The "epsilon" coin, which Hahn suggests was minted under Heraclonas, Tiberius and Constans II

The editors of the 1979 edition of the Synodicon Vetus, John M. Duffy and John Parker, note that the account becomes confused in this area, and the letter was more likely sent to Constantine III and Heraclonas. Christological controversy was rife at this time, and Martina enthusiastically supported Monothelitism.

Numismatists in the nineteenth century suggested that Tiberius was portrayed on certain copper coins, but these identifications were later shown to be mistaken. Some coins were presumably minted during his reign; Byzantine numismatist Wolfgang R. O. Hahn points out that mints sometimes resort to type immobilisé, continuing to use old motifs even after the emperor depicted has already died or lost power. Since there were multiple emperors in 641, the mints may have resorted to reusing a depiction of three co-emperors originally intended to signify Heraclius, Constantine III and Heraclonas. Hahn points to a coin with this depiction which bears an epsilon on its back, as well as the Heraclius monogram. One possibility is that the epsilon represents "ἕτερος", "the second", referring to "Heraclius II", meaning Heraclonas, whose name is a diminutive of his birth name Heraclius, and that this three-emperor coin has been made to represent Heraclonas and his co-emperors, Constans II and Tiberius. Alternatively, and with the same result, epsilon (the fifth letter of the Greek alphabet) could signify the fifth year of a lustrum cycle, which here would apply to the 15th indiction beginning on 1 September 641.

Some fragmentary Egyptian papyrus documents from 641 contain dating clauses that scholars have taken to refer to David, giving the number of years since he was raised to caesar. The Muslim conquest of Egypt was ongoing at this time, which would end with the negotiated surrender of Egypt to the Rashidun Caliphate. Martina and her sons took a relatively moderate stance toward the Muslims, likely out of fear that any intensification of the fighting would further jeopardize the regime.

Map of the Byzantine Empire (orange, possessing Anatolia, North Africa, and much of Italy) in 650, showing the Rashidun Caliphate (green, possessing Egypt, the Levant, and much of the Middle East), after the loss of Egypt and other territories to Muslim conquest

== Downfall ==
Though it is known that the rule of Martina and her sons was brief, both the timing and circumstances of their downfall are related in confusing and contradictory ways by the primary sources. According to Sebeos they were deposed by Valentinus when he marched on Constantinople to put Constans II on the throne. Theophanes states they were ousted by the Senate, and there is some evidence to suggest that the Senate acted following riots instigated by the aristocratic Blue faction. A seventh-century inscription found in the walls of Byzantium references the role that the Blues had within this insurrection, saying "The fortune of Constantine our God-protected ruler and of the Blues is victorious." John of Nikiû has the most detailed account of the downfall, but his story is regarded as improbable and unreliable. John relates that Martina and her sons had formed an alliance with the Bulgar ruler Kubrat and a military leader named David with the intention to deny the throne to the descendants of Constantine III. Following this, a military leader named Theodore led a rebellion and first defeated David, Martina's ally, and then marched against Constantinople where he overthrew Martina's regime.

The sources all report that some manner of the Byzantine practice of mutilating defeated enemies to prevent them from reclaiming the throne was undertaken at the defeat of Martina and her sons, possibly the first time such occurred, although they disagree on the exact nature of these mutilations. Theophanes says that the tongue of Martina and the nose of Heraclonas were cut off. John of Nikiû reports that Theodore "had Martina and her three sons, Heraclius, David, and Martinus, escorted forth with insolence, and he stripped them of the imperial crown, and he had their noses cut off, and he sent them in exile to Rhodes." George Ostrogorsky and John Haldon date the deposition of Martina's sons to the end of September 641; Warren Treadgold to c. 5 November 641, while Stratos argued for January 642, accepting Theophanes' account that Heraclius died in March. There is no further historical record of Tiberius. Stratos speculates that Martina and her family simply lived out the rest of their lives peacefully on Rhodes.
