= Saborios =

Saborios or Saborius (Greek: Σαβώριος) was a Byzantine general who rose in revolt against Emperor Constans II (r. 641–668) in 667–668. He sought and obtained the aid of the Caliph Muawiyah I (r. 661–680), but was killed in a horse accident before confronting the imperial troops.

== Biography ==
Saborios is mentioned as being of Persian descent by Theophanes the Confessor (his name is a rendering of the Persian Shapur), but most modern scholars regard him an Armenian. He is sometimes identified with a certain Pasagnathes, "patrikios of the Armenians", who rebelled in 651/652.

In 667, Saborios was the governing general (strategos) of the theme of the Armeniacs, covering the northeastern part of Byzantine Anatolia. At the time, and for several years, Emperor Constans II had been residing in Syracuse in Sicily, having left the capital Constantinople in the hands of his young son, co-emperor, and eventual successor, Constantine IV (r. 668–685). In the emperor's absence, Caliph Muawiyah had sent a series of devastating raids into Anatolia, targeting chiefly the Armeniac theme.

Taking advantage of the absence of many soldiers of the other themes with Constans in Sicily, Saborios launched a revolt in late 667. In order to secure his rear, he sent one of his generals, Sergios, to Damascus to enlist Muawiyah's support. Constantine, learning of the rebellion, also sent an envoy, the eunuch koubikoularios Andrew, to the caliph. Andrew, however, could not match the rebel's offer of a heavy tribute ("the entire public revenues" according to Theophanes) and Muawiyah agreed to support Saborios with troops. Despite this setback, Andrew arranged for Sergios, who had insulted him during the negotiations, to be captured at a pass near Arabissus in Cilicia by troops loyal to the emperor. Sergios was then castrated and impaled on a stake.

Nevertheless, with his eastern flank secure, Saborios marched west towards Constantinople, and succeeded in gaining control over most of Anatolia. He camped with his men at Hexapolis, also known as Hadrianopolis, in Bithynia, where he drilled his troops and awaited the arrival of the Arab army. Saborios was readying his men to face an oncoming loyalist army under the patrikios Nikephoros, when his horse bolted, slamming his head on a city gate and killing him. The Armeniac troops, left leaderless, quickly submitted, and by the time the Arab troops arrived, the revolt was effectively over. The Arab army used the turmoil to raid as far as the Bosporus and capture Amorion, but the city was retaken by the Byzantines during the following winter.

== Legacy ==
Saborios's rebellion did not result in any territorial losses for Byzantium, but was important nonetheless as the first attested rebellion of a thematic force, heralding a number of similar revolts during the remainder of the 7th and throughout the 8th centuries. Despite the continued occurrence of revolts, however, Saborios's fate also encouraged a belief, oft-repeated in Byzantine and Syriac sources, that death would result from rebelling against the lawful emperor in Constantinople, and from dealing with the infidel Muslims.
