= Fausta (wife of Constans II) =

Byzantine empress from 642 to 668

- Augusta

Empress of the Byzantine Empire
- Tenure: 642–668
- Born: c. 630
- Died: after 668; Constantinople (now Istanbul, Turkey)
- Burial: Church of the Holy Apostles
- Spouse: Constans II
- Issue: Constantine IV; Heraclius; Tiberius
- Dynasty: Heraclian
- Father: Valentinus

Fausta (Greek: Φαύστα, romanized: Faústa; c. 630 – after 668) was the Byzantine empress as the wife of Constans II, whom she married in 642.

== Family ==
Fausta was a daughter of Valentinus, a general of Armenian origins, reputedly a descendant of the Arsacids.

Valentinus enters historical record as an adjutant of Philagrius, the sakellarios (treasurer) of Heraclius. Heraclius died on 11 February 641. His will left the throne to two of his sons, as co-rulers to each other. The first son was Constantine III, his only known son by his first wife Eudokia. The second son was Heraklonas, eldest son of Heraclius by his niece and second wife Martina. Martina was to remain Augusta and thus maintain influence at court.

Constantine was the only one of the two co-emperors to be old enough to rule by himself. He was about twenty-nine years old at the time but already suffered from tuberculosis. Chances were that he would not survive long and Heraklonas would remain as sole emperor. However Constantine set about to secure the loyalty of the Byzantine army for himself. His father had entrusted Patriarch Pyrrhus I of Constantinople with the administration of a treasury fund for Martina. Constantine confiscated the fund and used it for the spring military payroll and substantial donations to the army, estimated to about two millions coins.

Valentinus was appointed commander of the eastern divisions of the Byzantine army at about the same time. The extent of his actual jurisdiction is uncertain due to an ongoing war with the Umayyad Caliphate under Umar. He was appointed by Constantine and would remain loyal to him.

== Marriage ==
Constantine III died between April and May 641, after a reign of three to four months. Heraklonas was left the senior emperor by default and was placed under the regency of Martina. However partisans of Constantine in the army spread the rumor that their emperor had been poisoned.

Valentinus took control of the troops in Anatolia and before long started a revolt in the name of Constans II, eldest surviving son of Constantine III. The boy was barely eleven years old but was proclaimed the rightful heir to his father by the rebels. Valentine led a march to Chalcedon and thus set camp almost directly opposite Constantinople.

The revolt by the Anatolian forces was soon matched by a revolt within the capital. Both sharing the same goal of placing Constans on the throne. Martina had to agree to concessions. Constans was proclaimed co-emperor and her ally Patriarch Pyrrhus was forced to resign. He was replaced by Patriarch Paul II of Constantinople who was an acceptable choice for the rebels. Valentinus was offered the title comes excubitorum, commander of the Excubitors, and thus promoted to a position of great power in the Byzantine court.

All concessions were in vain. In September, 641, Valentinus entered the city. Heraklonas and Martina were deposed and subjected to mutilation: the nose of Heraklonas and the tongue of Martina were cut, and both were exiled to Rhodes. Constans was left the only Emperor, and was soon after bethrothed to Fausta.

The marriage took place in 642. According to the chronicle of John of Nikiû, Valentinus tried to become co-emperor, his argument being that an adult emperor was needed against the Caliphate. The people of Constantinople rose again in defense of Constans and the general had to be content with the offer of general command of the army. His second attempt to rise to the throne in 644 was also stopped by revolt. Theophanes the Confessor reports this second attempt cost Valentinus his life.

== Empress ==
The first known son of Fausta and Constans was Constantine IV. He was born c. 650, eight years following the marriage of his parents. He was proclaimed co-emperor in 654. Two younger sons are known, Heraclius and Tiberius, because of being proclaimed co-emperors in 659.

In 661, Constans II left Constantinople for Syracuse where he set his residence for the rest of his reign. Constantine IV, Heraclius and Tiberius remained in the capital. There is some uncertainty over the location of Fausta.

On September 15, 668, Constans II was assassinated in his bath by his chamberlain. Fausta likely survived him. Constantine succeeded to the throne with his brothers as co-emperors. Constantine had Heraclius and Tiberius deposed in 681. Fausta could still be alive at the time.

De Ceremoniis by Constantine VII mentions the grave of Fausta in the Church of the Holy Apostles but not the date of her death.

== Sources ==
- Charanis, Peter (1963). The Armenians in the Byzantine Empire. Lisbon: Fundação Calouste Gulbenkian Armenian Library. OCLC 17186882.
- Charles, Robert H. (2007) [1916]. The Chronicle of John, Bishop of Nikiu: Translated from Zotenberg's Ethiopic Text. Merchantville, NJ: Evolution Publishing. ISBN 9781889758879.
- Treadgold, Warren (1997). A History of the Byzantine State and Society. Stanford, California: Stanford University Press. ISBN 0-8047-2630-2.

Royal titles
Preceded by Gregoria	Byzantine Empress consort 642–668	Succeeded by Anastasia
