= Mizizios =

Mizizios Մժէժ
- Emperor of the Romans
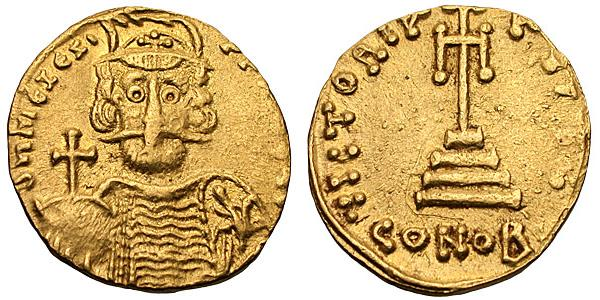
- A solidus of Mizizios struck in Syracuse, Sicily

Usurper of the Byzantine Empire
- Reign: 15 July 668 – February/March 669 (7 months)
- Predecessor: Constans II
- Successor: Constantine IV
- Born: 622
- Died: 669 (Aged 46-47)

Mizizios or Mezezius (Greek: Μιζίζιος; Armenian: Մժէժ, romanized: Mžēž or Mzhezh) (Note: Called "Mizizios" (Μιζίζιος) by Theophanes the Confessor; "Μizizos" or "Nizizos" (Μιζιζός/Νιζιζός) by George Monachos; "Nizizios" (Νιζίζιος) by Symeon the Logothete; "Mezeuxios" (Μεζεύξιος) by Pope Gregory II. PmbZ, Mizizios (#5163)) was an Armenian noble who served as a general of Byzantium, later usurping the Byzantine throne in Sicily from 668 to 669.

== Origin and early career ==
According to the Byzantine chroniclers, Mizizios was an Armenian, and "exceedingly handsome and beautiful". According to Cyril Toumanoff, he descended from the princely Gnuni family. In a letter supposedly written by Pope Gregory II to the Emperor Leo III the Isaurian (r. 717–741 A.D), he is referred to as komes of the Opsikion (Latin: obsequium)—at that time not yet a province, but rather the emperor's personal military retinue and field army. The 12th-century Syriac chronicle of Michael the Syrian, and the so-called Chronicle of 1234, also accord him the rank of patrikios.

== Usurpation and death ==
Mizizios accompanied Emperor Constans II (r. 641–668 A.D) in his Italian and Sicilian expedition. When Constans was murdered in Syracuse, Sicily, in 668 A.D, Mizizios was proclaimed emperor against his will. However, according to the supposed letter of Pope Gregory II, the Sicilian bishops had pushed him to rebellion, because Constans had been a heretic for his support of Monothelitism. Michael the Syrian implies that the rebellion lasted about seven months before it was suppressed, but the sources, and modern scholars, are divided in how that came about: Theophanes the Confessor reports that Constans' son, Constantine IV (r. 668–685 A.D), personally led an expedition to Sicily, where he had Mizizios and his father's murderers executed, while the Liber pontificalis reports that loyalist troops from Italy and the Exarchate of Africa suppressed the revolt, executed Mizizios, and sent his severed head to Constantinople.

Mizizios had one son, John, who remained on Sicily after his father's execution. According to Michael the Syrian, in ca. 678 A.D, he too rebelled against Constantine IV, and also lasted for seven months before the emperor arrived in Sicily and defeated and killed him.

== Sources ==
- Kazhdan, Alexander, ed. (1991). The Oxford Dictionary of Byzantium. Oxford and New York: Oxford University Press. ISBN 0-19-504652-8.
- Lilie, Ralph-Johannes; Ludwig, Claudia; Pratsch, Thomas; Zielke, Beate (2013). Prosopographie der mittelbyzantinischen Zeit Online. Berlin-Brandenburgische Akademie der Wissenschaften. Nach Vorarbeiten F. Winkelmanns erstellt (in German). Berlin and Boston: De Gruyter.
