= Cecily Hennessy =

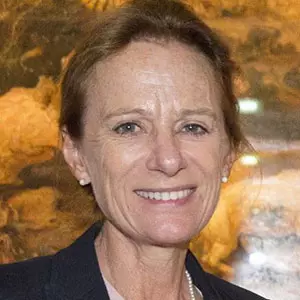

Cecily Jane Hennessy, FSA is the Academic Director of Christie's Education, London. She has promoted studies on the imagery of children and is an authority on the representation of children, adolescents and the family in Byzantium.

Her book, Images of Children in Byzantium, published in 2008, has been followed by many articles and essays on children, adolescents and the family in Byzantium, on middle and late Byzantine manuscripts, and on the architecture, topography and paintings of Constantinople, Ravenna and Jerusalem.

She has also published, for a general audience, Painting in Cappadocia: A Guide to the Sites and Byzantine Church Decoration, in 2013 and Early Christian and Medieval Rome: A Guide to the Art and Architecture, in 2017.

She completed her PhD thesis at the Courtauld Institute of Art in 2001. In November 2016 she was elected a fellow of the Society of Antiquaries of London.

== Selected publications ==
=== Books ===
- Images of Children in Byzantium, Ashgate, 2008. ISBN 978-0754656319
- Painting in Cappadocia: A Guide to the Sites and Byzantine Church Decoration, Cecily Hennessy Publications, 2013. ISBN 978-0957662803
- Early Christian and Medieval Rome: A Guide to the Art and Architecture, Cecily Hennessy Publications, 2017. ISBN 978-0957662810

=== Contributions ===
- The Early Christian and Byzantine entries, 30,000 years of Art, Phaidon, 2007.
- The Early Christian and Byzantine entries, 10,000 years of Art, Phaidon, 2009.
- The Byzantine entries, The Art Museum, Phaidon, 2011.
