= Sykai =

Ancient suburb of Byzantium

Coordinates: 41°01′23″N 28°58′23″E

Sycae (Greek: Συκαί), later known as Justinianae (Ίουστινιάναι) and Justinianopolis (Ίουστινιανούπολις), was a town of ancient Thrace, a suburb of Byzantium-Constantinople, that was inhabited during the Roman and Byzantine empires.

Its site is located near the neighborhood of Galata in Karaköy, East Thrace (European Turkey).
