= Valentinus (usurper) =

Byzantine general and usurper (died 644 or 645)

Usurper of the Byzantine Empire
- Reign: c. 644 / 645
- Predecessor: Heraclonas
- Successor: Constans II
- Died: 644 or 645; Constantinople
- Issue: Fausta
Names
- Vałentinos Aršakuni
- Dynasty: Arsacid (by blood); Heraclian (by marriage of his daughter)

Valentinus (Ancient Greek: Οὐαλεντῖνος, romanized: Oualentĩnos or Ancient Greek: Βαλεντῖνος, romanized: Balentĩnos; died 644 or 645), sometimes anglicized as Valentine, was a Byzantine usurper of probable Armenian extraction, who served under emperor Constans II from 641 until 644 or 645. He rose to prominence under Heraclius Constantine (Constantine III), who appointed him to secure the succession of his son Heraclius (the later Constans II) to the throne, at the cost of Heraclonas and Martina. Valentinus managed to successfully depose them, along with Heraclonas's brothers David Tiberius and Martinus; this left Constans as sole ruler. Valentinus became the boy's regent, becoming the most powerful man in the empire. Following a failed military campaign against the Arabs, ties between him and Constans became increasingly hostile, such that in 644 or 645, Valentinus attempted to become augustus (emperor) and depose Constans. This failed, and Valentinus was lynched along with his envoy Antoninus.

== Biography ==
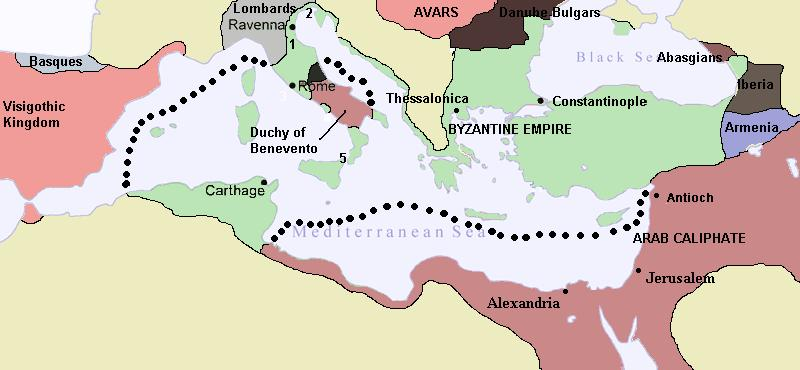
The Mediterranean region in Valentinus' time

According to Sebeos, Valentinus was of Armenian origin, being descended from the royal Arsacid clan. He was initially a member of the retinue of the sakellarios Philagrius, and was tasked in early 641 by Emperor Constantine III (r. February–May 641) to distribute money to the troops in order to secure their loyalty to his infant son Constans, and not the faction of Heraclius's empress-dowager Martina. It is possible that he had been appointed as general or plenipotentiary over the Byzantine army, or that he held the post of comes Obsequii.

In the event, however, on Emperor Constantine's death in May 641, Martina and her son Heraclonas seized power, whilst the loyalists of Constans, most prominently Philagrius, were banished. At this point, Valentinus, who had carried out his assignment and secured the support of the army, led the troops to Chalcedon, across the Bosporus from Constantinople, and demanded that Constans be made co-emperor. Bowing to this pressure, in late September Constans was crowned co-emperor by Heraclonas. In an effort to reduce the importance of this act, however, Heraclonas also had two of his younger brothers, David and Marinus, raised to the rank of augustus and caesar respectively. Valentinus himself was "rewarded" by being given the title of comes excubitorum. Nevertheless, according to Sebeos's account, it was Valentinus who engineered the final fall and mutilation of Martina and Heraclonas a few months later, and imposed Constans as sole Byzantine emperor.

By early 642, Valentinus became the most powerful man in the Byzantine Empire. He seemingly received quasi-imperial honour. Some authors state that he was raised to the rank of caesar, but primary sources only state that he was allowed to wear the imperial purple. At the same time, he was appointed commander-in-chief of the Byzantine army, and his daughter Fausta was married to the young Emperor Constans II and proclaimed augusta. In 643 or 644, Valentinus led a campaign against the Arabs, reportedly in a concerted pincer movement with another army under an Armenian general named David. Valentinus's army, however, was routed and he himself reportedly panicked and fled, leaving his treasury to be captured by the Arabs. This severely strained his ties with Constans and the Byzantine Senate.

In 644 or 645, Valentinus attempted to usurp his son-in-law's throne. He appeared at Constantinople with a contingent of troops, and demanded to be crowned emperor. His bid for the throne, however, failed, since both the capital's populace and the leading men of the state, Patriarch Paul II foremost, rejected his claim. According to the chroniclers, the populace lynched his envoy Antoninus, before proceeding to kill Valentinus himself.

== Sources ==
- Kazhdan, Alexander, ed. (1991). The Oxford Dictionary of Byzantium. Oxford and New York: Oxford University Press. ISBN 0-19-504652-8.
- Jones, A. H. M.; Martindale, J. R.; Morris, John, eds. (1992). "Valentinus 5". Prosopography of the Later Roman Empire. Vol. III. Cambridge University Press. pp. 1354–1355. ISBN 9780521201605.
- Lilie, Ralph-Johannes; Ludwig, Claudia; Pratsch, Thomas; Zielke, Beate (2001). "Ualentinos (#8545)". Prosopographie der mittelbyzantinischen Zeit: 1. Abteilung (641–867), Band 5 : Theophylaktos (# 8346) – az-Zubair (# 8675), Anonymi (# 10001–12149) (in German). Berlin and Boston: De Gruyter. pp. 69–73. ISBN 978-3-11-016675-0.
- John of Nikiû (c. 700), Chronicle, 1916 translation by Zotenberg.
