= De Imperatoribus Romanis =

Online peer-reviewed encyclopedia about Byzantine and Roman Emperors

De Imperatoribus Romanis (DIR) is an online peer-reviewed encyclopedia about the emperors of the Roman Empire, including the Byzantine Empire. It was established in 1996 by Michael DiMaio and hosted at Salve Regina University. The Academic Computer Services of Loyola University Chicago has hosted the encyclopedia since June 2023.

The Cambridge Companion to the Age of Constantine (2006) says that its articles "offer sound overviews and a regularly updated bibliography".
