= Constans II =

Roman emperor from 641 to 668

- Emperor of the Romans
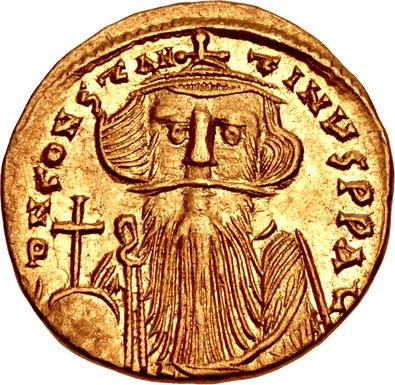
- A solidus of Constans II c. 651–3 (aged 21–3), wearing a crown and holding the globus cruciger. The inscription reads d n constantinus pp av.

Byzantine emperor
- Reign: November 641 – 15 July 668
- Coronation: September 641
- Predecessor: Heraclonas
- Successor: Constantine IV
- Co-emperors: Tiberius (641); Heraclius (659–681); Tiberius (659–681); Constantine IV (654–668)
- Born: Heraclius; 7 November 630; Constantinople
- Died: 15 July 668 (aged 37); Syracuse, Sicily
- Spouse: Fausta
- Issue Detail: Constantine IV; Heraclius; Tiberius
Regnal name
- Latin: Imperator Caesar Flavius Constantinus Augustus; Greek: Αὐτοκράτωρ καῖσαρ Φλάβιος Κωνσταντῖνος αὐγουστος (Note: Recorded under the Armenian form and word order as Ogostos Kostandin in Movses Kaghankatvatsi II.20, where an Armenian translation of a letter from this emperor appears. The words Constantinus Avg were also used on his solidi.)
- Dynasty: Heraclian
- Father: Constantine III
- Mother: Gregoria
- Religion: Nicene Christianity

Constans II (Note: The Byzantines themselves did not use regnal numbers, which are instead applied to the emperors by modern historians. Constans II is most commonly enumerated after Constans I (r. 337–340), but has also sometimes been enumerated as Constans III, also counting the co-emperor Constans (r. 409–411). "Constans" is a nickname given to the Emperor, who had been baptized Heraclius (Herakleios) (Greek: Ἡράκλειος, romanized: Hērákleios) and reigned officially as "Constantine" (Greek: Κωνσταντῖνος, romanized: Kōnstantīnos, lit. 'Constantinus'). The nickname established itself in Byzantine texts and has become standard in modern historiography. It was apparently well known during his lifetime, as Constantine IV sometimes called himself "Constantinos Constantos", i.e. "Constantine, son of Constans". The emperor has also rarely been designated Constantine III, a name typically reserved for his father Heraclius Constantine.) (Greek: Κώνστας, romanized: Kōnstās; 7 November 630 – 15 July 668), also called "the Bearded" (Greek: ὁ Πωγωνᾶτος, romanized: ho Pōgōnãtos), (Note: Some sources call him "Constantine the Bearded". The nickname was previously attributed to his son Constantine IV, who was known by his contemporaries as "Constantine the Younger".) was the Byzantine emperor from 641 to 668. Constans was the last attested emperor to serve as consul, in 642, (Note: His inauguration as consul is sometimes dated to 632, but this is likely a mistake, as the consular inauguration was usually celebrated on January of the first regnal year.) although the office continued to exist until the reign of Leo VI the Wise (r. 886–912). His religious policy saw him steering a middle line in disputes between the Orthodox and Monothelites by refusing to persecute either and prohibited discussion of the natures of Jesus Christ under the Typos of Constans in 648. His reign coincided with Arab invasions under Umar, Uthman, and Mu'awiya I in the late 640s to 660s. Constans was the first emperor to visit Rome since the fall of the Western Roman Empire in 476, and the last one to visit Rome while the Empire still held it.

== Origins and early career ==
Constans was born on 7 November 630 in Constantinople, the Byzantine capital, to Gregoria and Constantine III. Constantine III was a son of Emperor Heraclius, while his mother Gregoria was a daughter of Nicetas, a first cousin of Heraclius.

Heraclius died in February 641 and was succeeded by Constantine III and Heraclonas, his younger half-brother through Heraclius' second marriage to Martina. Constans was most likely elevated to caesar by his father to ease his succession to the throne against Martina and her sons. Constantine III died suddenly after three months of rule, leaving the 15-year old Heraclonas as senior emperor.

In September 641, the 10-year old Constans II was crowned co-emperor due to rumors that Heraclonas and Martina poisoned Constantine III. Later that same year, on or around 5 November, Heraclonas was deposed by Valentinus, one of Heraclius’ most trusted generals, and Constans II was left as sole emperor. (Note: Some sources, such as the PBW, date the deposition of Heraclonas on 9 November. The date is unsourced and unexplained, but it's probably a mistake for 5 November.) Constans owed his rise to the throne to a popular reaction against his uncle and to the protection of the soldiers led by Valentinus. Although the precocious emperor addressed the senate with a speech blaming Heraclonas and Martina for eliminating his father, he reigned under a regency of senators led by Patriarch Paul II of Constantinople. In 644, Valentinus attempted to seize power for himself, but failed.

== Reign as emperor ==
Map of the Byzantine Empire (orange, possessing Anatolia, North Africa, and much of Italy) in 650, showing the Rashidun Caliphate (green, possessing Egypt, the Levant, and much of the Middle East), after the loss of Egypt and other territories to Muslim conquest

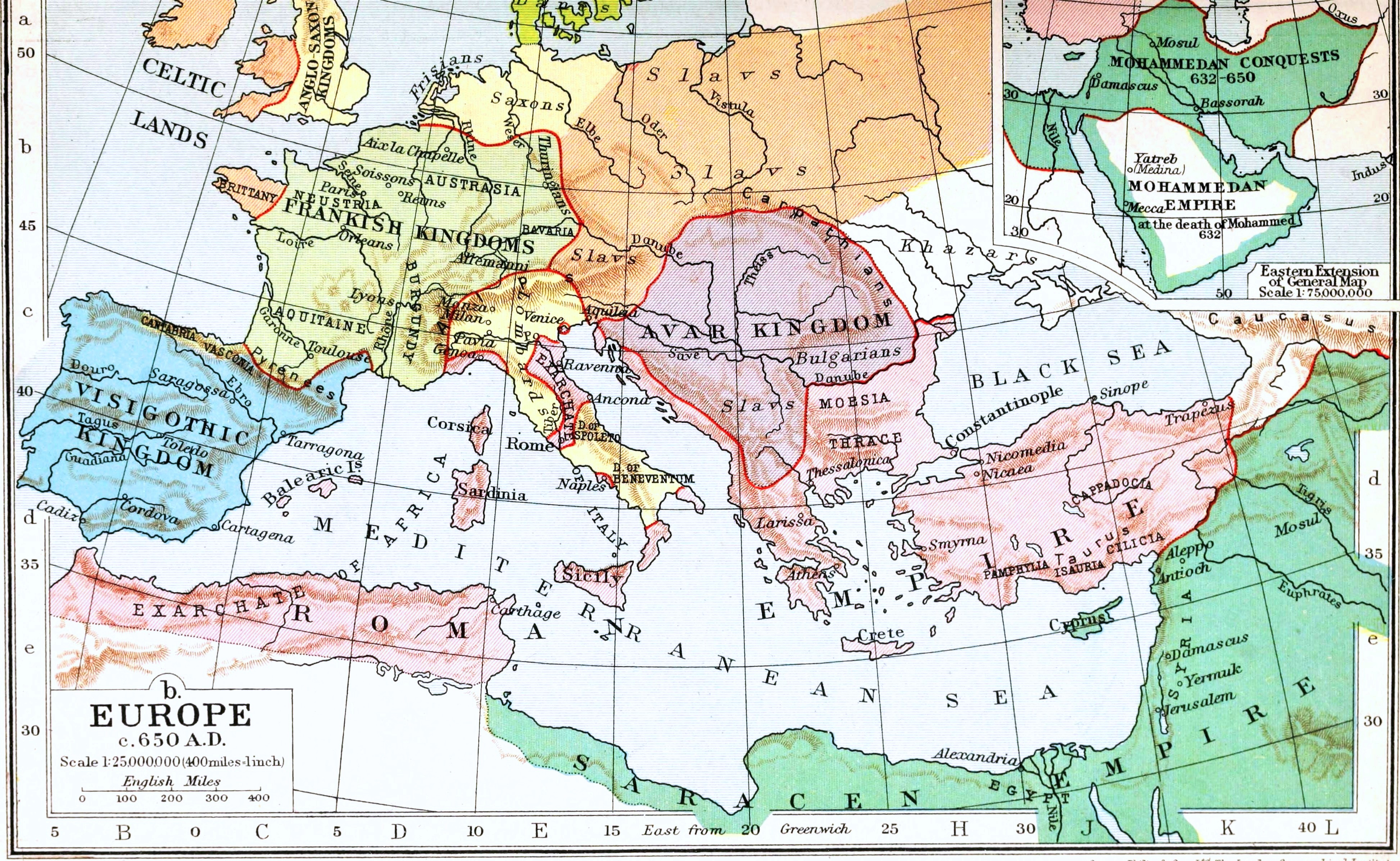
Byzantine Empire in 650 under Constans II

Under Constans, the Byzantines completely withdrew from Egypt in 642, and the third Rashidun caliph Uthman (r. 644–656) launched numerous attacks on the islands of the Mediterranean and Aegean Seas. A Byzantine fleet under the admiral Manuel occupied Alexandria again in 645, and the Alexandrians hailed him as a liberator, since the caliphate levied heavier taxes and showed less respect for their religion. However, Manuel squandered his time and popularity in plundering the countryside, and eventually the Arab army managed to force him to embark for home. The situation was complicated by the violent opposition to Monothelitism by the clergy in the west and the related rebellion of the Exarch of Carthage, Gregory the Patrician. The latter fell in battle against the army of caliph Uthman, and the region remained a vassal state under the Caliphate until the First Fitna broke out and imperial rule was restored.

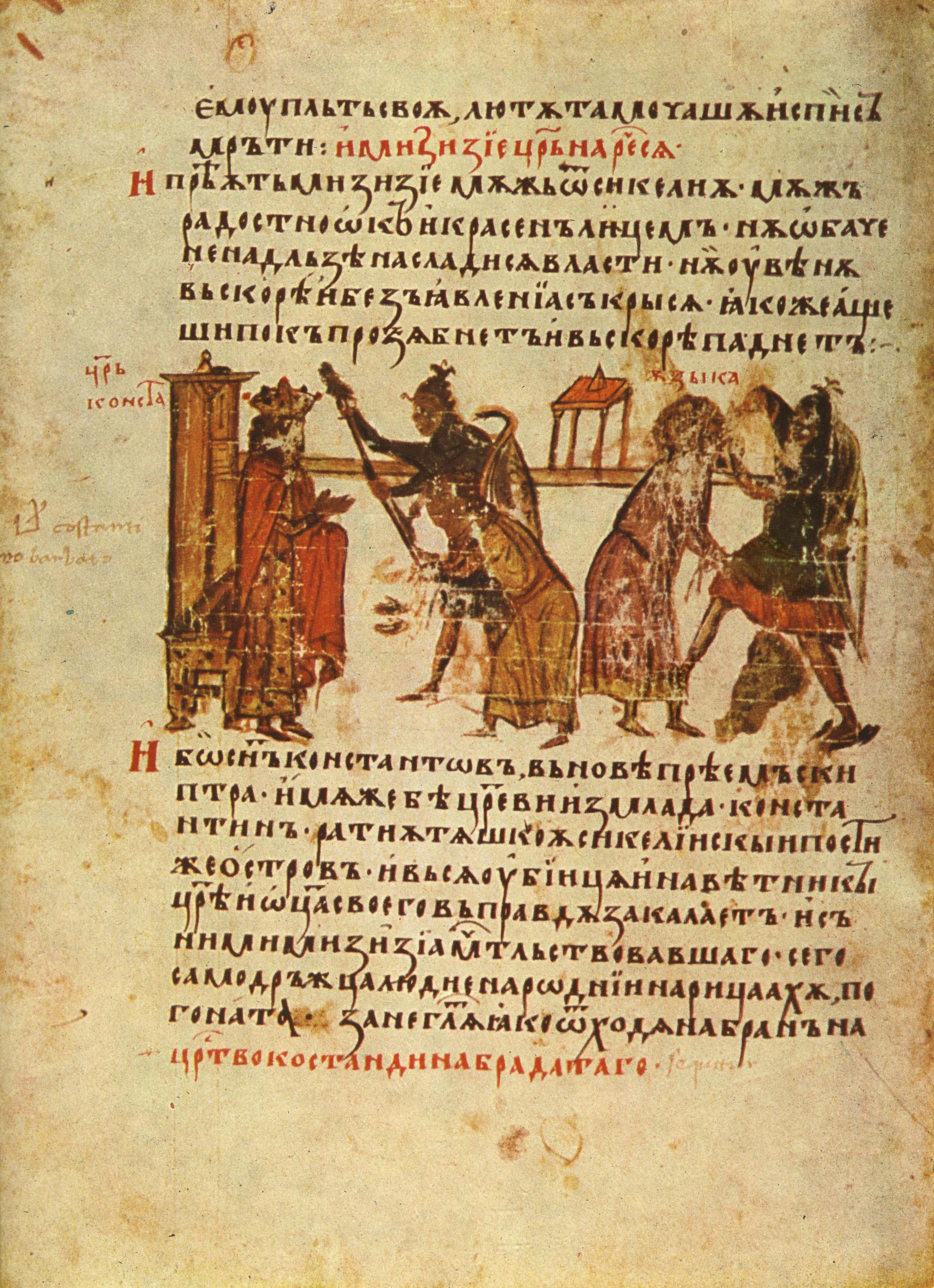
Torture of Maximus the Confessor under the orders of emperor Constans II, miniature from the 12th century Manasses Chronicle

Constans attempted to steer a middle line in the church dispute between Orthodoxy and Monothelitism by refusing to persecute either and prohibiting further discussion of the natures of Jesus Christ by decree in 648 (the Typos of Constans). Naturally, this live-and-let-live compromise satisfied few passionate participants in the dispute.

Meanwhile, the advance of the Rashidun Caliphate continued unabated. In 647 they entered Armenia and Cappadocia and sacked Caesarea Mazaca. In the same year, they raided Africa and killed Gregory. In 648, the Arabs raided into Phrygia, and in 649 they launched their first maritime expedition against Crete. A major Arab offensive into Cilicia and Isauria in 650–651 forced the Emperor to enter into negotiations with Caliph Uthman's governor of Syria, Mu'awiya I (r. 656–661), who later reigned as the first Umayyad caliph. The truce that followed allowed a short respite and made it possible for Constans to hold the western portions of Armenia.

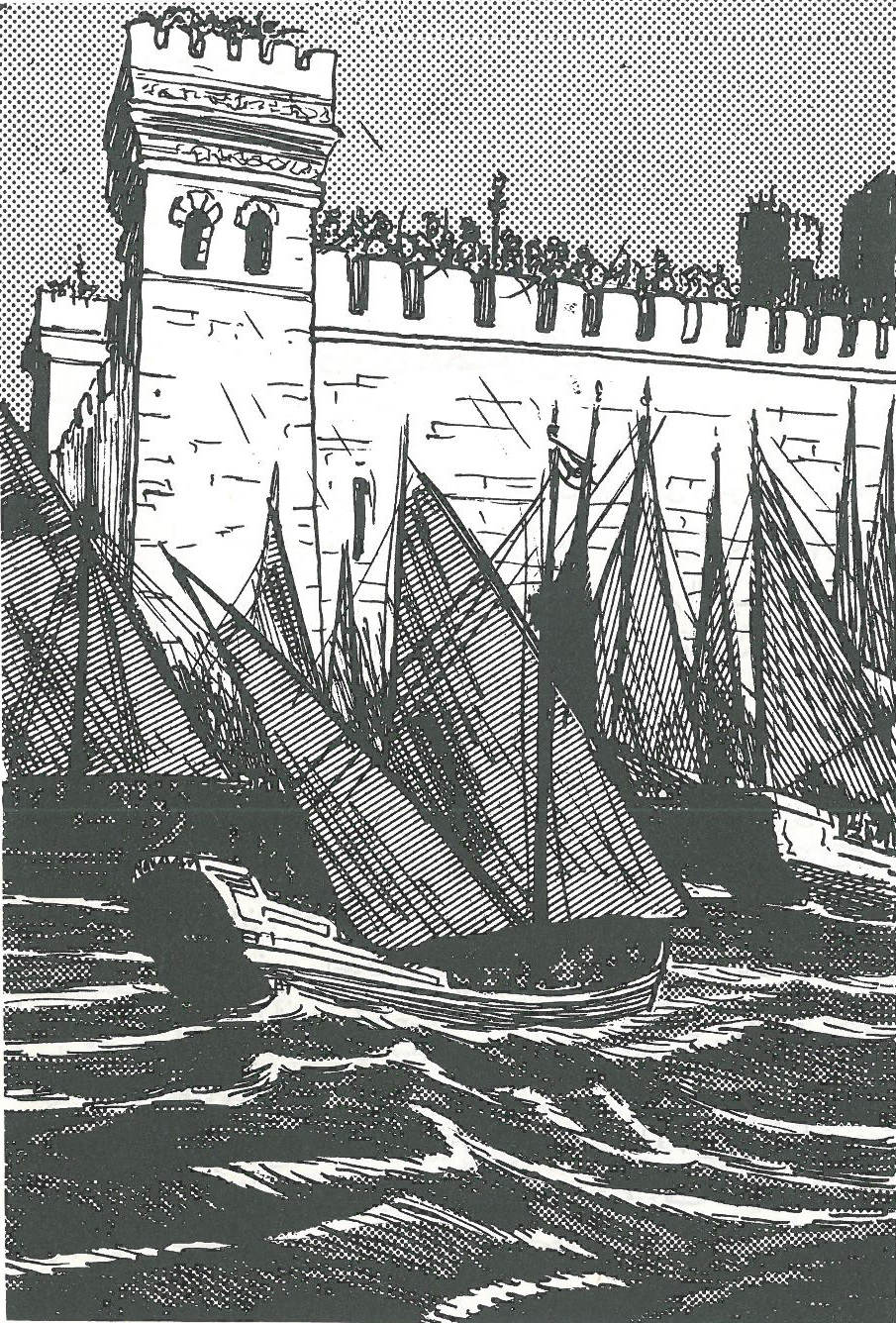
The Roman fleet engaging the Arabs at the Battle of the Masts off the Lycian coast as seen in an artistic depiction from 1935.

In 654, however, Mu'awiya renewed his raids by sea, plundering Rhodes. Constans led a fleet to attack the Muslims at Phoinike (off Lycia) in 655 at the Battle of the Masts, but he was defeated: 500 Byzantine ships were destroyed in the battle, and the Emperor himself was almost killed. The sea battle was so devastating that the emperor escaped only by trading clothes with one of his men. According to chronicler Theophanes the Confessor, before the battle Constans dreamed of being at Thessalonica: this dream predicted his defeat because "Thessalonika" is similar to the phrase thes allo niken ("gave victory to another (the enemy)" in Greek). Caliph Uthman was preparing to attack Constantinople, but he did not carry out the plan, as the First Fitna broke out in 656.

In 658, with the eastern frontier under less pressure, Constans defeated the Slavs in the Balkans, temporarily reasserting some notion of Byzantine rule over them and resettled some of them in Anatolia (c. 649 or 667). In 659 he campaigned far to the east, taking advantage of a rebellion against the Caliphate in Media. The same year he concluded peace with the Arabs.

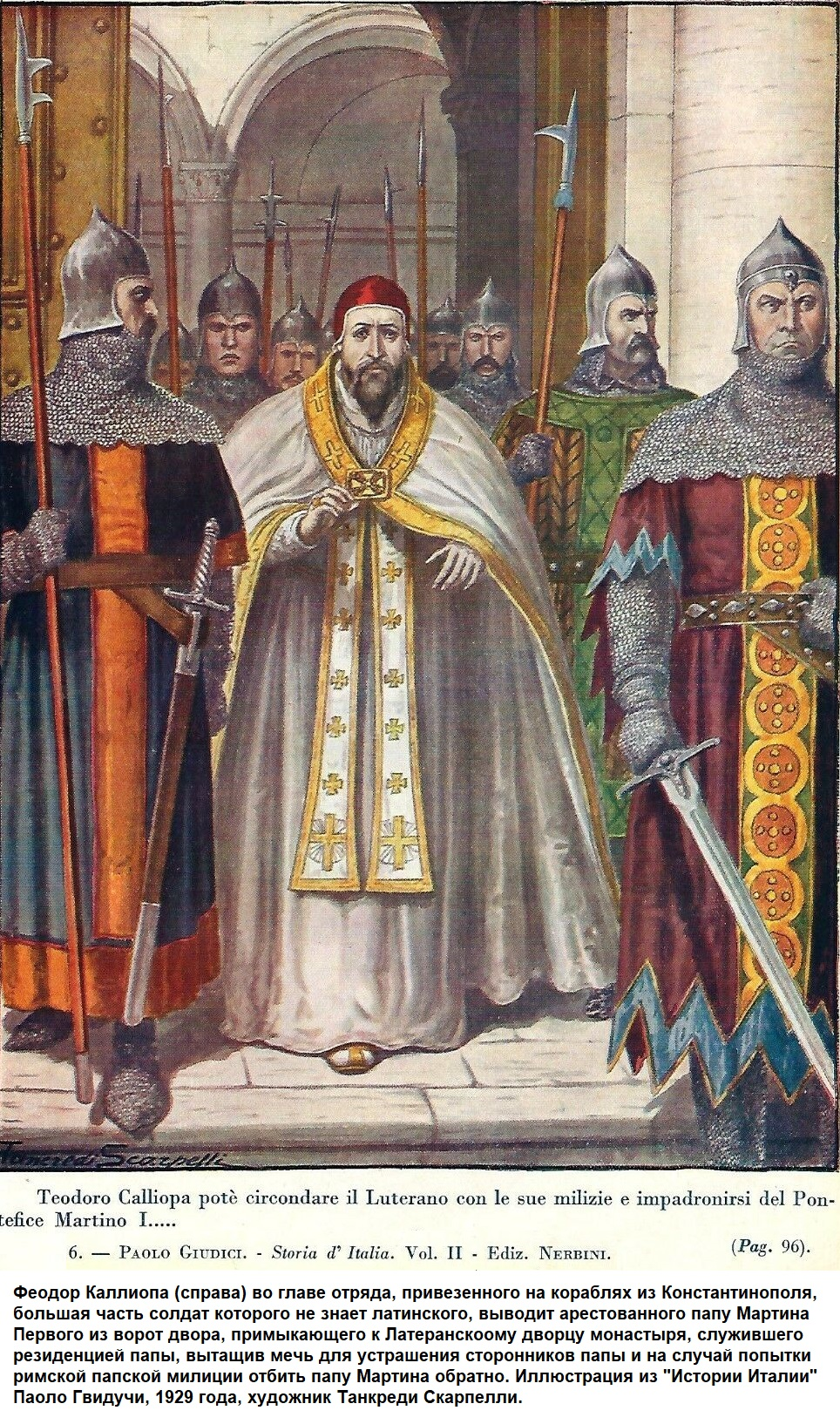
Pope Martin I being arrested by the exarch of Ravenna Theodore Calliopolis by order of Constans II as imagined in an artistic depiction from 1929.

Now Constans could turn to church matters once again. Pope Martin I had condemned both Monothelitism and Constans' attempt to halt debates over it in the Lateran Council of 649. The Emperor ordered the Exarch of Ravenna to arrest the Pope. Exarch Olympius excused himself from this task, but his successor, Theodore I Calliopas, carried it out in 653. Pope Martin was brought to Constantinople and condemned as a criminal, ultimately being exiled to Cherson, where he died in 655.

Constans grew increasingly fearful that his younger brother, Theodosius, could oust him from the throne; he therefore obliged Theodosius to take holy orders and later had him killed in 660. Constans' sons Constantine, Heraclius, and Tiberius had been associated on the throne since the 650s. However, having attracted the hatred of the citizens of Constantinople, Constans decided to leave the capital and to move to Syracuse in Sicily.

On his way, he stopped in Macedonia and fought the Slavs at Thessalonica with success. Then, in the winter of 662–663, he made his camp at Athens.

From there, in 663, he continued to Italy. He launched an assault against the Lombard Duchy of Benevento, which then encompassed most of Southern Italy. Taking advantage of the fact that Lombard king Grimoald I of Benevento was engaged against Frankish forces from Neustria, Constans disembarked at Taranto and besieged Lucera and Benevento. However, the latter resisted and Constans withdrew to Naples. During the journey from Benevento to Naples, Constans II was defeated by Mitolas, Count of Capua, near Pugna. Constans ordered Saburrus, the commander of his army, to attack the Lombards again, but he was defeated by the Beneventani at Forino, between Avellino and Salerno.

In 663 Constans visited Rome for twelve days—the first emperor since the fall of the Western Roman Empire in 476 and, along with John V Palaiologos, one of only two Eastern Roman emperors since the division of the Roman empire in 395 to set foot in Rome—and was received with great honor by Pope Vitalian (657–672). Although on friendly terms with Vitalian, he stripped buildings (including the Pantheon) of their ornaments and bronze to be carried back to Constantinople, and in 666 declared the Pope to have no jurisdiction over the Archbishop of Ravenna, since that city was the seat of the Exarch, his immediate representative. His subsequent moves in Calabria and Sardinia were marked by further strippings and request of tributes that enraged his Italian subjects.

According to Warren Treadgold, the first themes were created between 659 and 661, during the reign of Constans II. However, John Haldon states that this idea is not supported by a "a shred of evidence", although redistribution of the armies across the Anatolian provinces did take place, and likely resulted in administrative changes.

== Death and succession ==
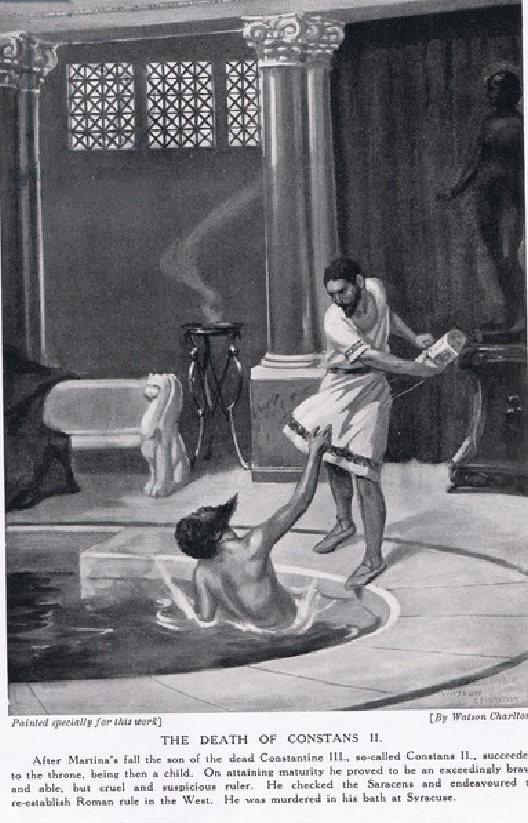
The death of Constans II from the book Hutchinson's History of the Nations (c. 1920)

On 15 July 668, he was assassinated in his bath by his chamberlain, either killed with a bucket or stabbed with a knife. His son Constantine succeeded him as Constantine IV. A brief usurpation in Sicily by Mezezius was quickly suppressed by the new emperor.

== Other sources ==
Historian Robert G. Hoyland asserts that Mu'awiya posed a significant Islamic challenge to Constans: "deny [the divinity of] Jesus and turn to the Great God who I worship, the God of our father Abraham". He speculates that Mu'awiya's tour of Christian sites in Jerusalem was done to demonstrate "the fact that he, and not the Byzantine emperor, was now God's representative on earth".

=== Record in Chinese sources ===
643 in Chang'an. Meeting of the ambassadors of Constans II with Emperor Taizong of Tang China. The subject of negotiations was cargo delays on the Silk Road due to tribal conflict in the Western Turkic Khaganate, which was responsible for the safety of goods on the Silk Road. To restore order, Taizong supported the election of the head of the khaganate to Irbis and it was necessary to inform the authorities of the Byzantium Empire, which was the main recipient of the goods. Illustration from the early 20th century.

The Chinese dynastic histories of the Old Book of Tang and New Book of Tang mention several embassies made by Fu lin (拂菻), which they equated with Daqin (the Roman Empire). These are recorded as having begun in the year 643 with an embassy sent by the king Boduoli (波多力, Constans II Pogonatos) to Emperor Taizong of Tang, bearing gifts such as red glass and green gemstones. Other contacts are reported taking place in 667, 701, and perhaps 719, sometimes through Central Asian intermediaries. These histories also record that the Arabs (Da shi 大食) sent their commander "Mo-yi" (Chinese: 摩拽伐之, Pinyin: Mó zhuāi fá zhī), to besiege the Byzantine capital, Constantinople, and forced the Byzantines to pay them tribute.

This Arab commander "Mo-yi" was identified by historian Friedrich Hirth as Muawiyah I (r. 661–680), the governor of Syria before becoming the Umayyad caliph. The same books also described Constantinople in some detail as having massive granite walls and a water clock mounted with a golden statue of man. The Byzantine historian Theophylact Simocatta, writing during the reign of Heraclius (r. 610–641), relayed information about China's geography, its capital city Khubdan (Old Turkic: Khumdan, i.e. Chang'an), its current ruler Taisson whose name meant "Son of God" (Chinese: Tianzi), and correctly pointed to its reunification by the Sui dynasty (581–618) as occurring during the reign of Maurice, noting that China had previously been divided politically along the Yangzi River by two warring nations.

== Family ==
By his wife Fausta, a daughter of the patrikios Valentinus, Constans II had three sons:

- Constantine IV, who succeeded him as Emperor
- Heraclius, co-emperor from 659 to 681
- Tiberius, co-emperor from 659 to 681

== Coinage gallery ==
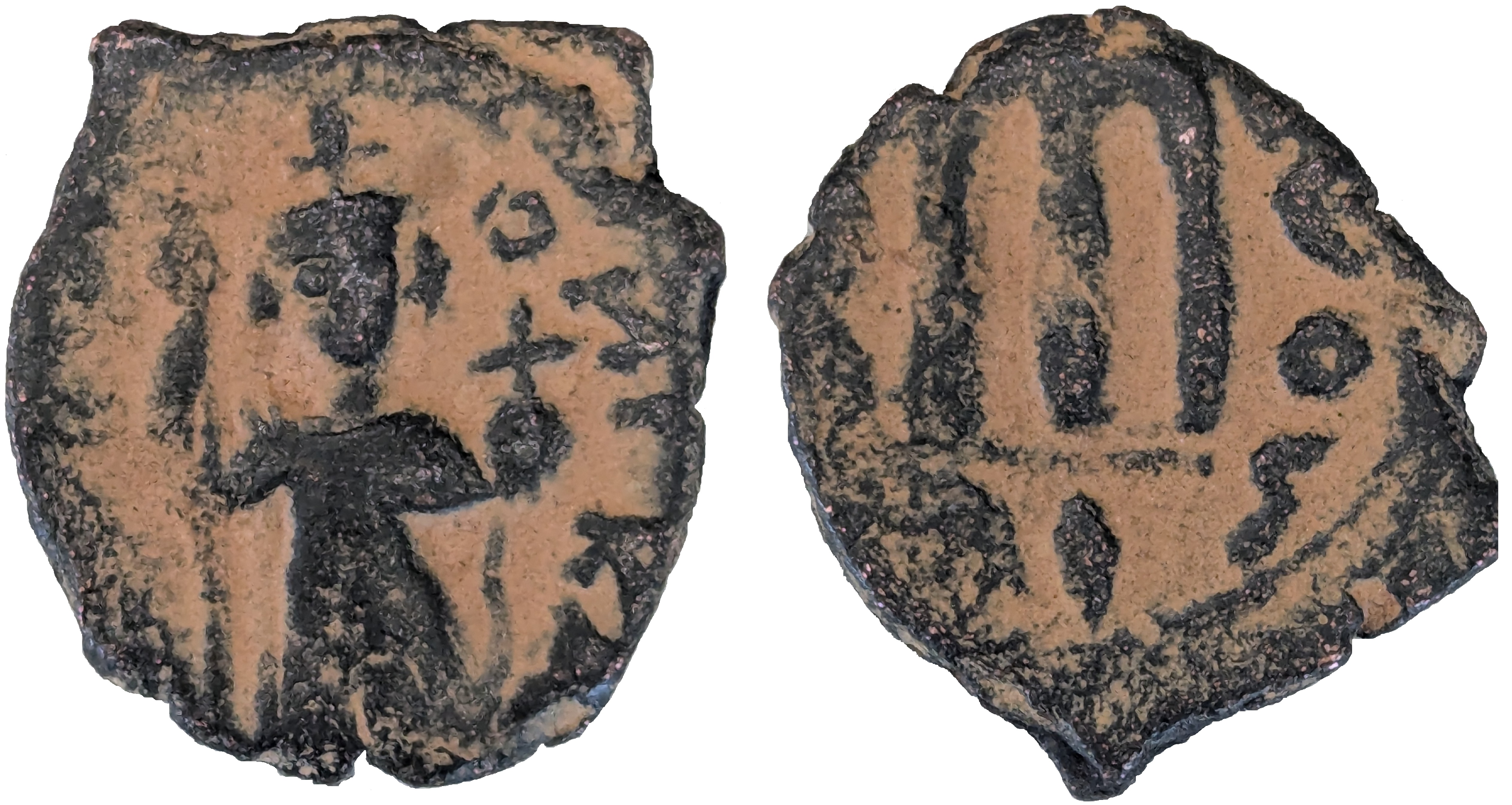
Bronze follis of Roman Emperor Constans II, 641 AD, the first year of reign, inscribed on the obverse: [EN T૪T]O NIKA

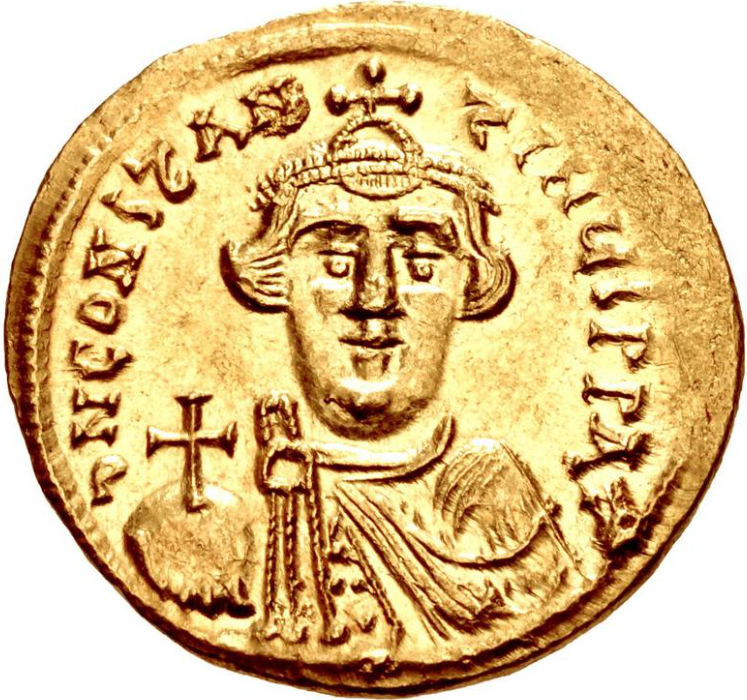
Solidus of Constans II, c. 642 (aged 12) (Note: This type is sometimes mistaken for Heraclonas.)

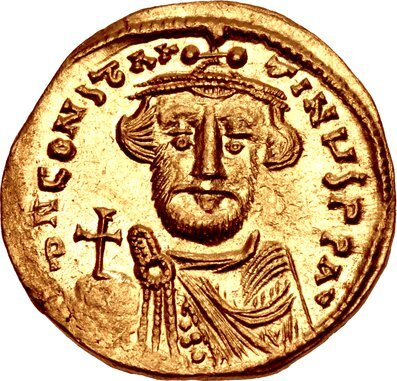
Solidus minted c. 647 (aged 17)

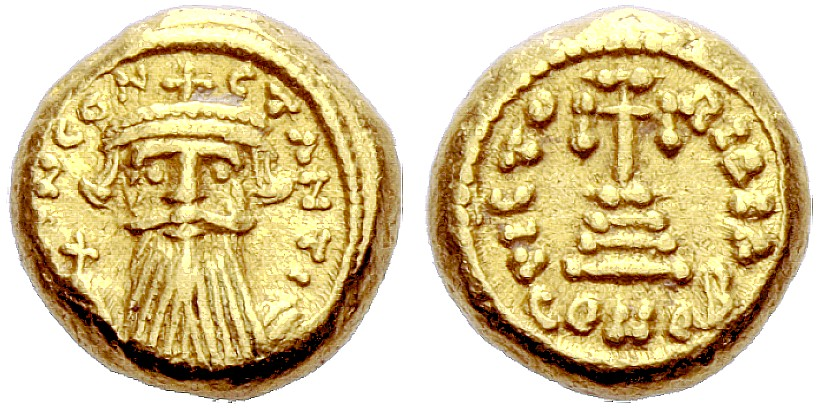
A solidus minted in Carthage, 652 (aged 22)

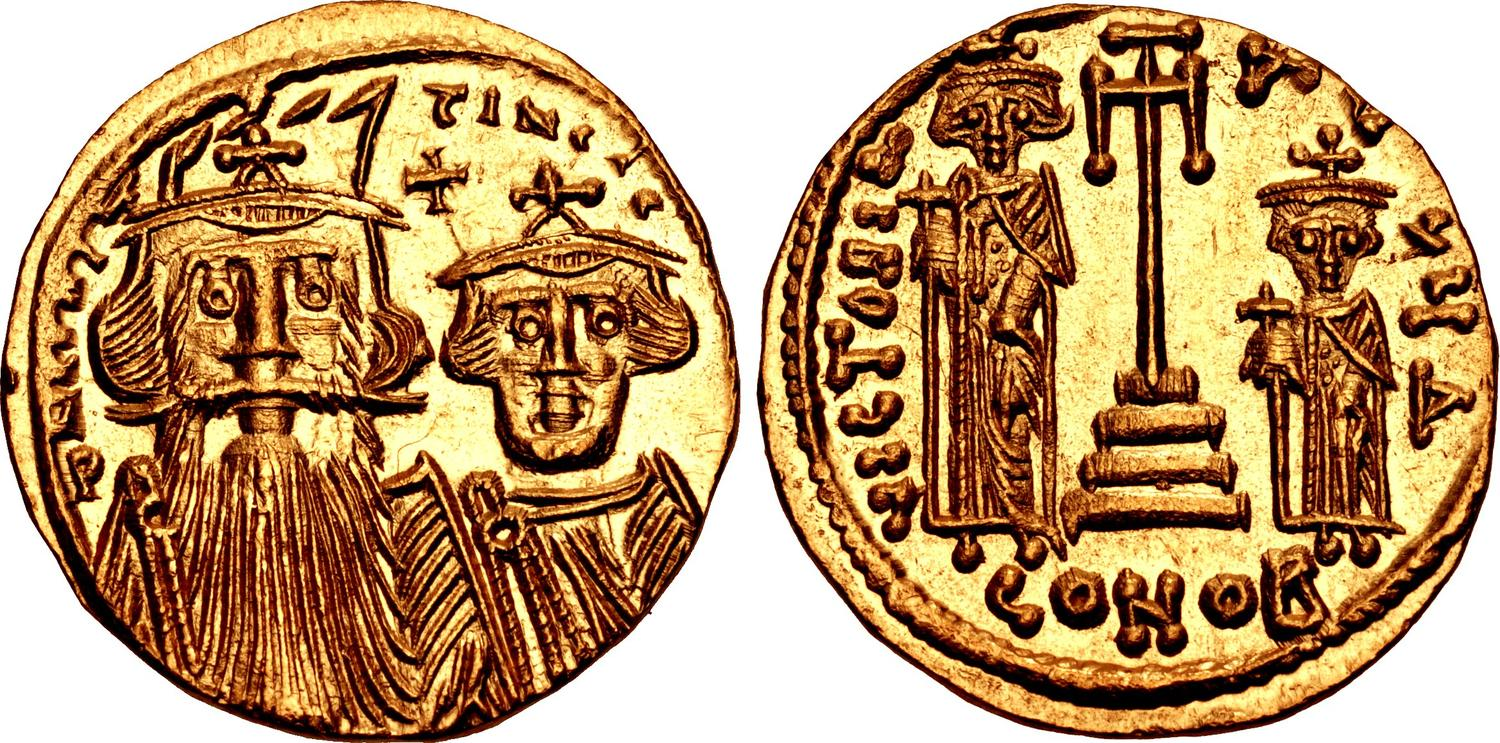
Solidus minted c. 662 (aged 32) depicting Constans alongside his sons and co-emperors

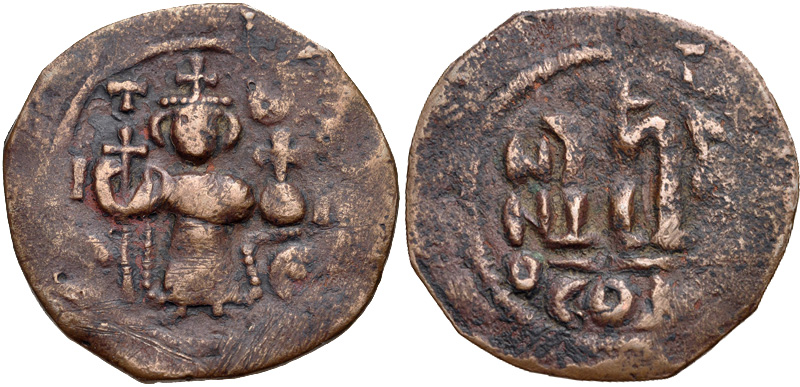
Coin of the Rashidun Caliphate with Constans II, c. 647–670

== See also ==
- List of Byzantine emperors

== Bibliography ==
- Biermann, Felix (2009). "Byzantine Coin Finds from the 6th to the 8th Century Between Elbe and Oder and their Meaning for Settlement History". In Wołoszyn, M. (ed.). Byzantine Coins in Central Europe between the 5th and 10th Century. Kraków: Institute of Archaeology University of Rzeszów. ISBN 978-8376760087.
- Browning, Robert (1992). The Byzantine Empire. The Catholic University of America Press.
- Bury, John Bagnell (1889). A History of the Later Roman Empire from Arcadius to Irene (395 A. D. to 800 A.D.). Vol. II. Macmillan and Co.
- Foss, Clive (2005). "Emperors named Constantine". Revue numismatique (in French). 6 (161): 93–102. doi:10.3406/numi.2005.2594.
- Grierson, Philip (1968). Catalogue of the Byzantine Coins in the Dumbarton Oaks Collection. Vol. 2. Dumbarton Oaks. ISBN 9780884020240.
- Hoyland, Robert G. (2015). In God's Path: the Arab Conquests and the Creation of an Islamic Empire. Oxford: Oxford University Press. ISBN 978-0-19-991636-8.
- Ostrogorsky, George (1956). History of the Byzantine State. Oxford: Basil Blackwell.
- Meyendorff, John (1989). Imperial unity and Christian divisions: The Church 450–680 A.D. The Church in history. Vol. 2. Crestwood, NY: St. Vladimir's Seminary Press. ISBN 978-0-88-141056-3.
- Moosa, Matti (2008). "Islam and Christianity: Jihad and Holy War". The Crusades: Conflict Between Christendom and Islam. Piscataway: Gorgias Press. pp. 33–54. doi:10.31826/9781463211158-003. ISBN 978-1463211158.
- Pringle, Denys (1981). The Defence of Byzantine Africa from Justinian to the Arab Conquest: An Account of the Military History and Archaeology of the African Provinces in the Sixth and Seventh Century. Oxford, United Kingdom: British Archaeological Reports. ISBN 0-86054-119-3.
- Widdowson, Marc (2009). "The early Christian insurgency in Islamic Spain". Small Wars & Insurgencies. 20 (3–4): 478–506. doi:10.1080/09592310903026977. S2CID 144989232.
- Zuckerman, Constantin (2010). "On the title and the office of the Byzantine basileus". Travaux et Mémoires du Centre de recherche d'Histoire et Civilisation de Byzance. 16: 865–890. ISSN 0577-1471.
- Kazhdan, Alexander, ed. (1991). The Oxford Dictionary of Byzantium. Oxford and New York: Oxford University Press. ISBN 0-19-504652-8.
- Lilie, Ralph-Johannes; Ludwig, Claudia; Pratsch, Thomas; Zielke, Beate (2013). "Konstans II". Prosopographie der mittelbyzantinischen Zeit Online. Berlin-Brandenburgische Akademie der Wissenschaften. Nach Vorarbeiten F. Winkelmanns erstellt (in German). Berlin and Boston: De Gruyter.
- Liber Pontificalis
- Paul the Deacon, Historia Langobardorum, Book V

Constans II Heraclian dynasty Born: 7 November 630 Died: 15 July 668
Regnal titles
Preceded by Heraclonas	Byzantine Emperor; 641–668 with David Tiberius (641); Constantine IV (654–685); Heraclius (659–681); Tiberius (659–681)	Succeeded by Constantine IV
Political offices
Vacant Title last held by Heraclius Augustus in 639	Roman consul 642	Vacant Title next held by Constantinus Augustus in 668
