= Siege of Constantinople (717–718) =

717–718 siege of the Byzantine capital

Second Arab siege of Constantinople
- Part of the Arab–Byzantine wars (Early Muslim conquests)
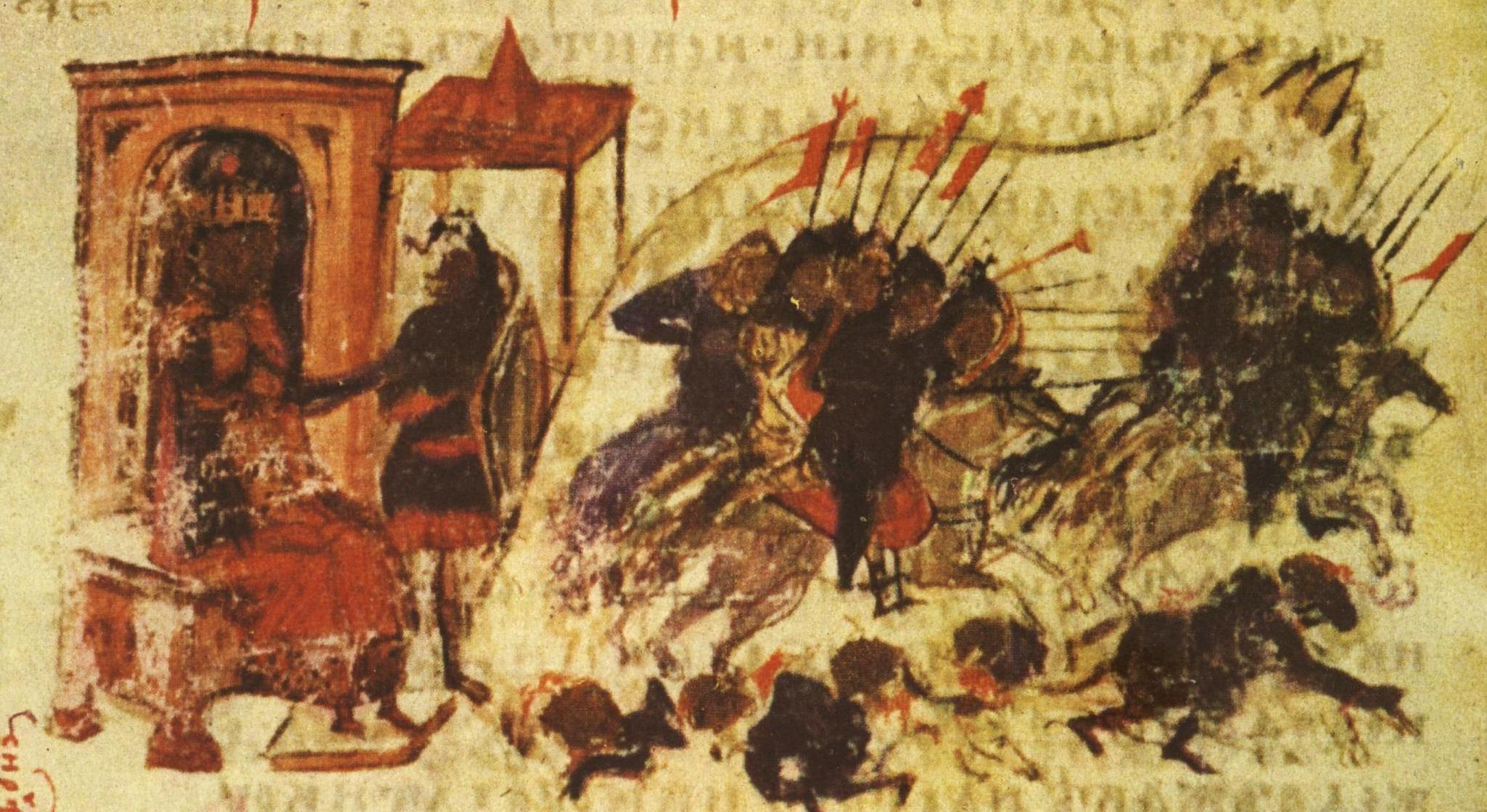
- The second Arab siege of Constantinople, as depicted in the 14th-century Bulgarian translation of the Manasses Chronicle
Date	15 July/August 717 – 15 August 718
Location	Constantinople, Thrace, Bithynia and Sea of Marmara (modern-day Istanbul, Turkey) 41.0125°N 28.9750°E
Result	Byzantine–Bulgarian victory

Belligerents
Umayyad Caliphate	Byzantine Empire; Bulgaria

Commanders and leaders
Sulayman ibn Abd al-Malik; Umar ibn Abd al-Aziz; Maslama ibn Abd al-Malik; Umar ibn Hubayra; Sulayman ibn Mu'ad; Bakhtari ibn al-Hasan; Amr ibn Qais; Abdallah al-Battal	Leo III the Isaurian; Tervel of Bulgaria

Strength
120,000 (al-Mas'udi); 1,800 ships (Theophanes)	c. 15,000 Byzantines (estimate) c. 12,000 Bulgars

Casualties and losses
150,000 killed (Muslim sources); 300,000 killed (Western sources)	Unknown

In 717–718, Constantinople, the capital of the Byzantine Empire, was besieged by the Muslim Arabs of the Umayyad Caliphate. The campaign marked the culmination of twenty years of attacks and progressive Arab occupation of the Byzantine borderlands, while Byzantine strength was sapped by prolonged internal turmoil. In 716, after years of preparations, the Arabs, led by Maslama ibn Abd al-Malik, invaded Byzantine Asia Minor. The Arabs initially hoped to exploit Byzantine civil strife and made common cause with the general Leo III the Isaurian, who had risen up against Emperor Theodosius III. Leo, however, deceived them and secured the Byzantine throne for himself.

After wintering in the western coastlands of Asia Minor, the Arab army crossed into Thrace in the early summer of 717 and built siege lines to blockade the city, which was protected by the massive Theodosian Walls. The Arab fleet, which accompanied the land army and was meant to complete the city's blockade by sea, was partly neutralized soon after its arrival by the Byzantine navy through the use of Greek fire. This allowed Constantinople to be resupplied by sea, while the Arab army was crippled by famine and disease during the unusually hard winter that followed. In spring 718, two Arab fleets sent as reinforcements were destroyed by the Byzantines after their Christian crews defected, and an additional army sent overland through Asia Minor was ambushed and defeated. Coupled with attacks by the Bulgars on their rear, the Arabs were forced to lift the siege on 15 August 718. On its return journey, the Arab fleet was almost completely destroyed by natural disasters.

The siege's failure had wide-ranging repercussions. The rescue of Constantinople ensured the continued survival of Byzantium and marked the end of a century of constant war, territorial losses and internal strife, while the Caliphate's strategic outlook was altered: although regular attacks on Byzantine territories continued, the goal of outright conquest was abandoned. Historians consider the siege to be one of history's most important battles, as its failure postponed the Muslim advance into Southeastern Europe for centuries.

== Background ==
Following the first Arab siege of Constantinople (674–678), the Arabs and Byzantines experienced a period of peace. After 680, the Umayyad Caliphate was in the throes of the Second Muslim Civil War, and the consequent Byzantine ascendancy in the East enabled the emperors to extract huge amounts of tribute from the Umayyad government in Damascus. In 692, as the Umayyads emerged as victors from their civil war, Emperor Justinian II (r. 685–695, 705–711) resumed hostilities with the Caliphate. The result was a series of Arab victories that led to the loss of Byzantine control over Armenia and the Caucasian principalities and a gradual encroachment upon the Byzantine borderlands. Year by year, the Caliphate's generals, usually members of the Umayyad family, launched raids into Byzantine territory and captured fortresses and towns. After 712, the Byzantine defensive system began to show signs of collapse: Arab raids penetrated further and further into Asia Minor, border fortresses were repeatedly attacked and sacked, and references to Byzantine reaction in the sources become more and more scarce. In this, the Arabs were aided by the prolonged period of internal instability that followed the first deposition of Justinian II in 695, in which the Byzantine throne changed hands seven times in violent coups. In the words of the Byzantinist Warren Treadgold, "the Arab attacks would in any case have intensified after the end of their own civil war.” With far more men, land, and wealth than Byzantium, the Arabs had begun to concentrate all their strength against it. Now they threatened to extinguish the empire entirely by capturing its capital."

== Sources ==
The information available on the siege comes from sources composed in later dates, which are often mutually contradictory. The main Byzantine source is the extensive and detailed account of the Chronicle of Theophanes the Confessor (760–817) and secondarily the brief account in the Breviarium of Patriarch Nikephoros I of Constantinople (died 828), which shows small differences, mainly chronological, from Theophanes's version. For the events of the siege, both authors appear to have used a primary account composed during the reign of Leo III the Isaurian (r. 717–741) which therefore contains a favourable depiction of the latter, while Theophanes apparently relies on an unknown biography of Leo (ignored by Nikephoros) for the events of 716. The 8th-century chronicler Theophilus of Edessa records the years leading up to the siege and the siege itself in some detail, paying particular attention to the diplomacy between Maslama and Leo III. The Arab sources, mainly the 11th-century Kitab al-'Uyun and the more concise narrative in the History of the Prophets and Kings by al-Tabari (838–923), rely on primary accounts by early 9th-century Arab writers, but are more confused and contain several legendary elements. The Syriac language accounts are based on Agapius of Hierapolis (died 942), who likely drew from the same primary source as Theophanes, but are far briefer.

== Opening stages of the campaign ==
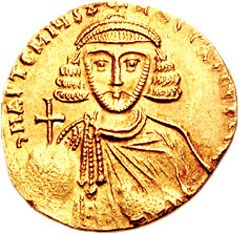
Gold solidus of Anastasius II, who prepared Constantinople for the coming Arab assault

The Arab successes opened the way for a second assault on Constantinople, an undertaking already initiated under Caliph al-Walid I (r. 705–715). Following his death, his brother and successor Sulayman (r. 715–717) took up the project with increased vigour, according to Arab accounts because of a prophecy that a Caliph bearing the name of a prophet would capture Constantinople; Sulayman (Solomon) was the only member of the Umayyad family to bear such a name. According to Syriac sources, the new Caliph swore "to not stop fighting against Constantinople before having exhausted the country of the Arabs or to have taken the city". The Umayyad forces began assembling at the plain of Dabiq north of Aleppo, under the direct supervision of the Caliph. As Sulayman was too sick to campaign himself, however, he entrusted command to his brother Maslama ibn Abd al-Malik. The operation against Constantinople came at a time when the Umayyad empire was undergoing a period of continuous expansion to the east and west. Muslim armies advanced into Transoxiana, India, and the Visigothic Kingdom of Hispania.

Arab preparations, especially the construction of a large fleet, did not go unnoticed by the worried Byzantines. Emperor Anastasius II (r. 713–715) sent an embassy to Damascus under the patrician and urban prefect, Daniel of Sinope, ostensibly in order to plea for peace, but in reality to spy on the Arabs. Anastasius, in turn, began to prepare for the inevitable siege: the fortifications of Constantinople were repaired and equipped with ample artillery (catapults and other siege weapons), while food stores were brought into the city. In addition, those inhabitants who could not stockpile food for at least three years were evacuated. Anastasius strengthened his navy and in early 715 dispatched it against the Arab fleet that had come to Phoenix—usually identified with modern Finike in Lycia, it may also be modern Fenaket across Rhodes, or perhaps Phoenicia (modern Lebanon), famed for its cedar forests—to collect timber for their ships. At Rhodes, however, the Byzantine fleet, encouraged by the soldiers of the Opsician Theme, rebelled, killed their commander John the Deacon and sailed north to Adramyttium. There, they acclaimed a reluctant tax collector, Theodosius, as emperor. Anastasius crossed into Bithynia in the Opsician Theme to confront the rebellion, but the rebel fleet sailed on to Chrysopolis. From there, it launched attacks against Constantinople, until, in late summer, sympathizers within the capital opened its gates to them. Anastasius held out at Nicaea for several months, finally agreeing to resign and retire as a monk. The accession of Theodosius, who from the sources comes across as both unwilling and incapable, as a puppet emperor of the Opsicians provoked the reaction of the other themes, especially the Anatolics and the Armeniacs under their respective strategoi ('generals') Leo the Isaurian and Artabasdos.

Map of Byzantine Asia Minor and Thrace in the early 8th century

In these conditions of near-civil war, the Arabs began their carefully prepared advance. In September 715, the vanguard, under general Sulayman ibn Mu'ad, marched over Cilicia into Asia Minor, taking the strategic fortress of Loulon on its way. They wintered at Afik, an unidentified location near the western exit of the Cilician Gates. In early 716, Sulayman's army continued into central Asia Minor. The Umayyad fleet under Umar ibn Hubayra cruised along the Cilician coast, while Maslama ibn Abd al-Malik awaited developments with the main army in Syria.

The Arabs hoped that the disunity among the Byzantines would play to their advantage. Maslama had already established contact with Leo the Isaurian. French scholar Rodolphe Guilland theorized that Leo offered to become a vassal of the Caliphate, although the Byzantine general intended to use the Arabs for his own purposes. In turn, Maslama supported Leo hoping to maximize confusion and weaken the Empire, easing his own task of taking Constantinople.

Sulayman's first objective was the strategically important fortress of Amorium, which the Arabs intended to use as a base the following winter. Amorium had been left defenceless in the turmoil of the civil war and would have easily fallen, but the Arabs chose to bolster Leo's position as a counterweight to Theodosius. They offered the city terms of surrender if its inhabitants would acknowledge Leo as emperor. The fortress capitulated, but still did not open its gates to the Arabs. Leo came to the vicinity with a handful of soldiers and executed a series of ruses and negotiations to garrison 800 men in the town. The Arab army, thwarted in its objective and with supplies running low, withdrew. Leo escaped to Pisidia and, in summer, supported by Artabasdos, was proclaimed and crowned as Byzantine emperor, openly challenging Theodosius.

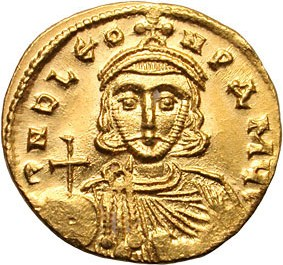
Gold solidus of Leo III

Leo's success at Amorium was fortunately timed, since Maslama with the main Arab army had in the meantime crossed the Taurus Mountains and was marching straight for the city. In addition, as the Arab general had not received news of Leo's double-dealing, he did not devastate the territories he marched through—the Armeniac and Anatolic themes, whose governors he still believed to be his allies. On meeting up with Sulayman's retreating army and learning what had transpired, Maslama changed direction: he attacked Akroinon and from there marched to the western coastlands to spend the winter. On his way, he sacked Sardis and Pergamon. The Arab fleet wintered in Cilicia. Leo, in the meantime, began his own march on Constantinople. He captured Nicomedia, where he found and captured, among other officials, Theodosius's son, and then marched to Chrysopolis. In spring 717, after short negotiations, he secured Theodosius's resignation and his recognition as emperor, entering the capital on 25 March. Theodosius and his son were allowed to retire to a monastery as monks, while Artabasdos was promoted to the position of kouropalates and received the hand of Leo's daughter, Anna.

== Opposing forces ==
From the outset, the Arabs prepared for a major assault on Constantinople. The late 8th-century Syriac Zuqnin Chronicle reports that the Arabs were "innumerable", while the 12th-century Syriac chronicler Michael the Syrian mentions a much-inflated 200,000 men and 5,000 ships. The 10th-century Arab writer al-Mas'udi mentions 120,000 troops, and the account of Theophanes the Confessor 1,800 ships. Supplies for several years were hoarded, and siege engines and incendiary materials (naphtha) were stockpiled. The supply train alone is said to have numbered 12,000 men, 6,000 camels and 6,000 donkeys, while according to the 13th-century historian Bar Hebraeus, the troops included 30,000 volunteers (mutawa) for the Holy War (jihad). The Byzantines' strength is entirely unknown, but Constantinople's defenders likely did not number over 15,000 men, given both the exhaustion of the Byzantine Empire's manpower and the limitations imposed by the need to maintain and feed such a force.

Whatever the true numbers, the attackers were considerably more numerous than the defenders; according to Treadgold, the Arab host may have outnumbered the entire Byzantine army. Little is known on the detailed composition of the Arab force, but it appears that it mostly consisted of, and was led by, Syrians and Jazirans of the elite ahl al-Sham ('People of Syria'), the main pillar of the Umayyad regime and veterans of the struggle against Byzantium. Alongside Maslama, Umar ibn Hubayra, Sulayman ibn Mu'ad, and Bakhtari ibn al-Hasan are mentioned as his lieutenants by Theophanes and Agapius of Hierapolis, while the later Kitab al-'Uyun replaces Bakhtari with Abdallah al-Battal.

Although the siege consumed a large part of the Caliphate's manpower and resources, it was still capable of launching raids against the Byzantine frontier in eastern Asia Minor during the siege's duration: in 717, Caliph Sulayman's son Daud captured a fortress near Melitene and in 718 Amr ibn Qais raided the frontier. On the Byzantine side, the numbers are unknown. Aside from Anastasius II's preparations (which might have been neglected following his deposition), the Byzantines could count on the assistance of the Bulgar ruler Tervel, with whom Leo concluded a treaty that possibly included alliance against the Arabs.

== Siege ==
Map of the environs of Constantinople in Byzantine times

In early summer, Maslama ordered his fleet to join him and with his army crossed the Hellespont (Dardanelles) at Abydos into Thrace. The Arabs began their march on Cοnstantinople, thoroughly devastating the countryside, gathering supplies, and sacking the towns they encountered. In mid-July or mid-August, the Arab army reached Constantinople and isolated it completely on land by building a double siege wall of stone, one facing the city and one facing the Thracian countryside, with their camp positioned between them. According to Arab sources, at this point Leo offered to ransom the city by paying a gold coin for every inhabitant, but Maslama replied that there could not be peace with the vanquished, and that the Arab garrison of Constantinople had already been selected.

The Arab fleet under Sulayman (often confused with the Caliph himself in the medieval sources) arrived on 1 September, anchoring at first near the Hebdomon. Two days later, Sulayman led his fleet into the Bosphorus and the various squadrons began anchoring by the European and Asian suburbs of the city: one part sailed south of Chalcedon to the harbours of Eutropios and Anthemios to watch over the southern entrance of the Bosporus, while the rest of the fleet sailed into the strait, passed by Constantinople and began making landfall on the coasts between Galata and Kleidion, cutting the Byzantine capital's communication with the Black Sea. But as the Arab fleet's rearguard, twenty heavy ships with 2,000 marines, was passing the city, the southerly wind stopped and then reversed, drifting them towards the city walls, where a Byzantine squadron attacked them with Greek fire. Theophanes reported that some went down with all hands, while others, burning, sailed down to the Princes' Islands of Oxeia and Plateia. The victory encouraged the Byzantines and dejected the Arabs, who, according to Theophanes, had originally intended to sail to the sea walls during the night and try to scale them using the ships' steering paddles. The same night, Leo drew up the chain between the city and Galata, closing the entrance to the Golden Horn. The Arab fleet became reluctant to engage the Byzantines, and withdrew to the safe harbour of Sosthenion further north on the European shore of the Bosporus.

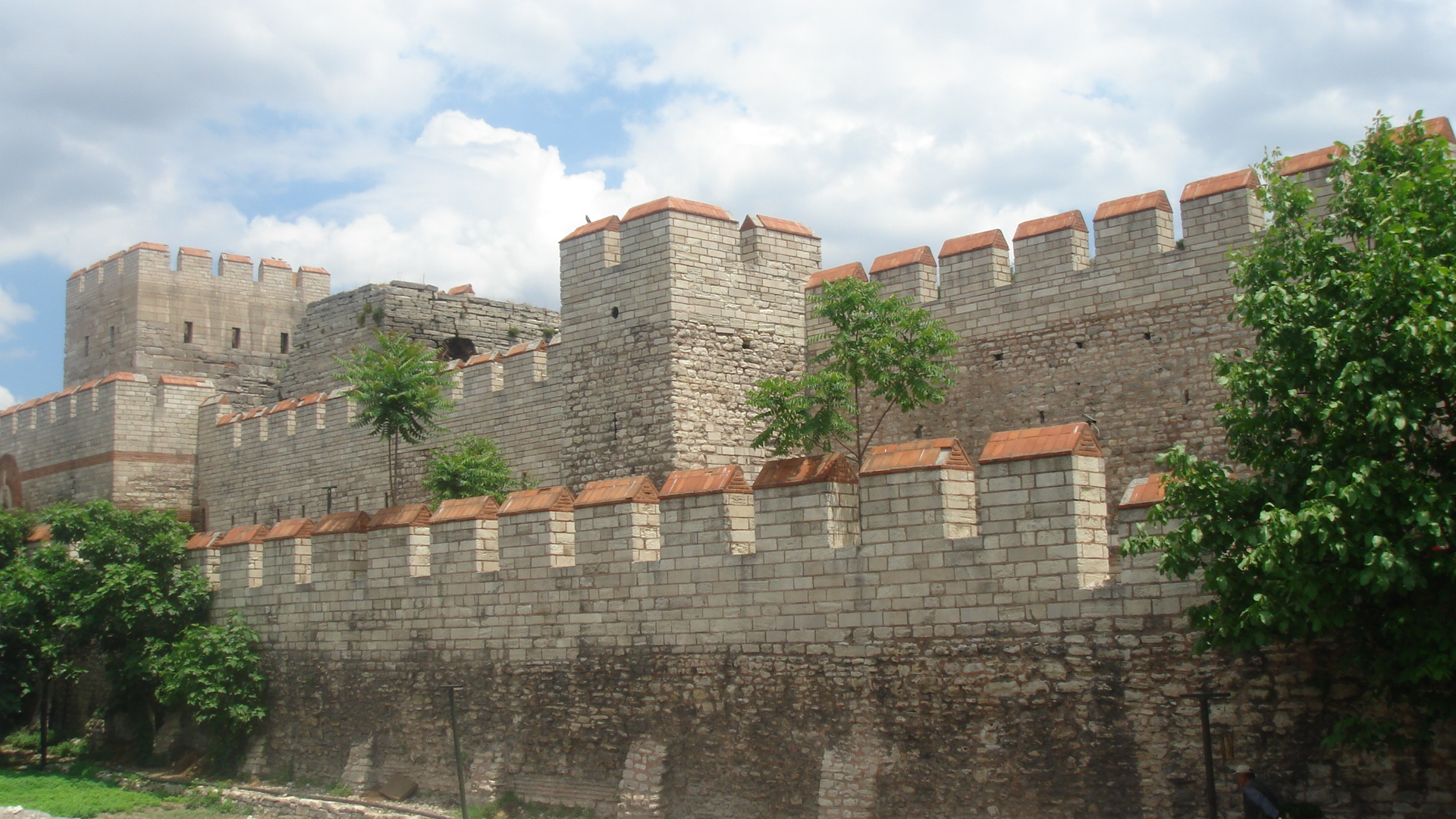
Photo of a restored section of the triple Theodosian Walls protecting Constantinople from its land side

The Arab army was well-provisioned, with Arab accounts reporting high mounds of supplies piled up in their camp, and had even brought along wheat to sow and harvest the next year. The failure of the Arab navy to blockade the city, however, meant that the Byzantines too could ferry in provisions. In addition, the Arab army had already devastated the Thracian countryside during its march and could not rely on it for foraging. The Arab fleet and the second Arab army, which operated in the Asian suburbs of Constantinople, were able to bring in limited supplies to Maslama's army. As the siege drew into winter, negotiations opened between the two sides, extensively reported by Arab sources but ignored by Byzantine historians. According to the Arab accounts, Leo continued to play a double game with the Arabs. One version claims that he tricked Maslama into handing over most of his grain supplies, while another claims that the Arab general was persuaded to burn them altogether, so as to show the inhabitants of the city that they faced an imminent assault and induce them to surrender. The winter of 718 was extremely harsh; snow covered the ground for over three months. As the supplies in the Arab camp ran out, a terrible famine broke out: the soldiers ate their horses, camels, and other livestock, and the bark, leaves and roots of trees. They swept the snow of the fields they had sown to eat the green shoots, and reportedly resorted to cannibalism and eating the dung of each other and their animals. Consequently, the Arab army was ravaged by epidemics; with great exaggeration, the Lombard historian Paul the Deacon put the number of their dead of hunger and disease at 300,000.

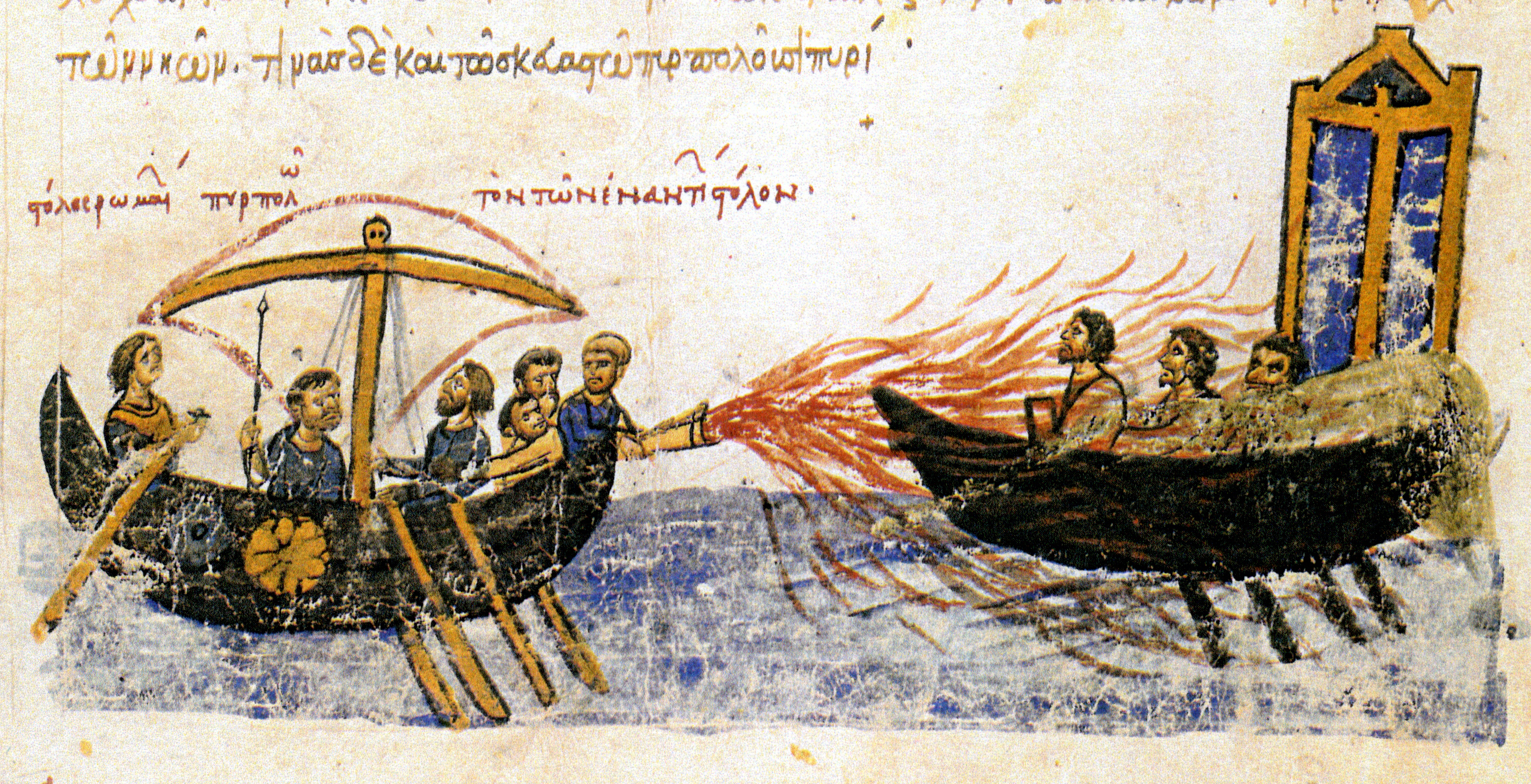
Depiction of the use of Greek fire, miniature from the Madrid Skylitzes

The Arab situation looked set to improve in spring when the new Caliph, Umar II (r. 717–720), sent two fleets to the besiegers' aid: 400 ships from Egypt under a commander named Sufyan and 360 ships from Africa under Izid, all laden with supplies and arms. At the same time, a fresh army began marching through Asia Minor to assist in the siege. When the new fleets arrived in the Sea of Marmara, they kept their distance from the Byzantines and anchored on the Asian shore, the Egyptians in the Gulf of Nicomedia near modern Tuzla and the Africans south of Chalcedon (at Satyros, Bryas and Kartalimen). Most of the Arab fleets' crews were composed of Christian Egyptians, however, and they began deserting to the Byzantines upon their arrival. Notified by the Egyptians of the advent and disposition of the Arab reinforcements, Leo launched his fleet in an attack against the new Arab fleets. Crippled by the defection of their crews, and helpless against Greek fire, the Arab ships were destroyed or captured along with the weapons and supplies they carried. Constantinople was now safe from a seaborne attack. On land too the Byzantines were victorious: their troops managed to ambush the advancing Arab army under a commander named Mardasan and destroy it in the hills around Sophon, south of Nicomedia.

Constantinople could now be easily resupplied by sea and the city's fishermen went back to work, as the Arab fleet did not sail again. Still suffering from hunger and pestilence, the Arabs also lost a major battle against the Bulgars, who killed, according to Theophanes, 22,000 men. The sources are divided on the details of the Bulgar participation in the siege: Theophanes and al-Tabari report that the Bulgars attacked the Arab encampment (likely because of their treaty with Leo), while according to the Syriac Chronicle of 846, it was the Arabs who strayed into Bulgar territory, seeking provisions. Michael the Syrian on the other hand mentions that the Bulgars participated in the siege from the beginning, with attacks against the Arabs as they marched through Thrace towards Constantinople, and subsequently on their encampment. According to some modern interpretations of the original sources, the first Bulgar victory may have been against a separate Arab army under Ukhaida that ranged as far as Beroia, followed by an attack against the Arabs in Thrace. The Bulgars continued harassing the Arab encampments for the duration of the siege.

The siege had clearly failed, and Caliph Umar sent orders to Maslama to retreat. After thirteen months of siege, on 15 August 718, the Arabs departed. The date coincided with the feast of the Dormition of the Theotokos (Assumption of Mary), and it was to her that the Byzantines ascribed their victory. The retreating Arabs were not hindered or attacked on their return, but their fleet lost more ships in a storm in the Sea of Marmara, while other ships were set afire by ashes from the volcano of Thera, and some of the survivors were captured by the Byzantines, so that Theophanes claims that only five vessels made it back to Syria. Arab sources claim that altogether 150,000 Muslims perished during the campaign, a figure which, according to the Byzantinist John Haldon, "while certainly inflated, is nevertheless indicative of the enormity of the disaster in medieval eyes".

== Aftermath ==
The Umayyad Caliphate and the Byzantine Empire, c. 740

The expedition's failure weakened the Umayyad state. As historian Bernard Lewis commented, "Its failure brought a grave moment for Umayyad power. The financial strain of equipping and maintaining the expedition caused an aggravation of the fiscal and financial oppression which had already aroused such dangerous opposition. The destruction of the fleet and army of Syria at the sea walls of Constantinople deprived the regime of the chief material basis of its power". The blow to the Caliphate's might was severe, and although the land army did not suffer losses in the same degree as the fleet, Umar is recorded as contemplating withdrawing from the recent conquests of Hispania and Transoxiana, as well as a complete evacuation of Cilicia and other Byzantine territories that the Arabs had seized over the previous years. Although his advisors dissuaded him from such drastic actions, most Arab garrisons were withdrawn from the Byzantine frontier districts they had occupied in the lead-up to the siege. In Cilicia, only Mopsuestia remained in Arab hands as a defensive bulwark to protect Antioch. The Byzantines even recovered some territory in western Armenia for a time. In 719, the Byzantine fleet raided the Syrian coast and burned down the port of Laodicea and, in 720 or 721, the Byzantines attacked and sacked Tinnis in Egypt. Leo also restored control over Sicily, where news of the Arab siege of Constantinople and expectations of the city's fall had prompted the local governor to declare an emperor of his own, Basil Onomagoulos. It was during this time, however, that effective Byzantine control over Sardinia and Corsica ceased.

Besides this, the Byzantines failed to exploit their success in launching attacks of their own against the Arabs. In 720, after a hiatus of two years, Arab raids against Byzantium resumed, although now they were no longer directed at conquest, but rather seeking booty. The Arab attacks would intensify again over the next two decades, until the major Byzantine victory at the Battle of Akroinon in 740. Coupled with military defeats on the other fronts of the overextended Caliphate, and the internal instability which culminated in the Abbasid Revolution, the age of Arab expansion came to an end.

== Historical assessment and impact ==
The second Arab siege of Constantinople was far more dangerous for Byzantium than the first as, unlike the loose blockade of 674–678, the Arabs launched a direct, well-planned attack on the Byzantine capital, and tried to cut off the city completely from land and sea. The siege represented a final effort by the Caliphate to "cut off the head" of the Byzantine Empire, after which the remaining provinces, especially in Asia Minor, would be easy to capture. The reasons for the Arab failure were chiefly logistical, as they were operating too far from their Syrian bases. However, the superiority of the Byzantine navy through the use of Greek fire, the strength of Constantinople's fortifications, and the skill of Leo III in deception and negotiations also played important roles.

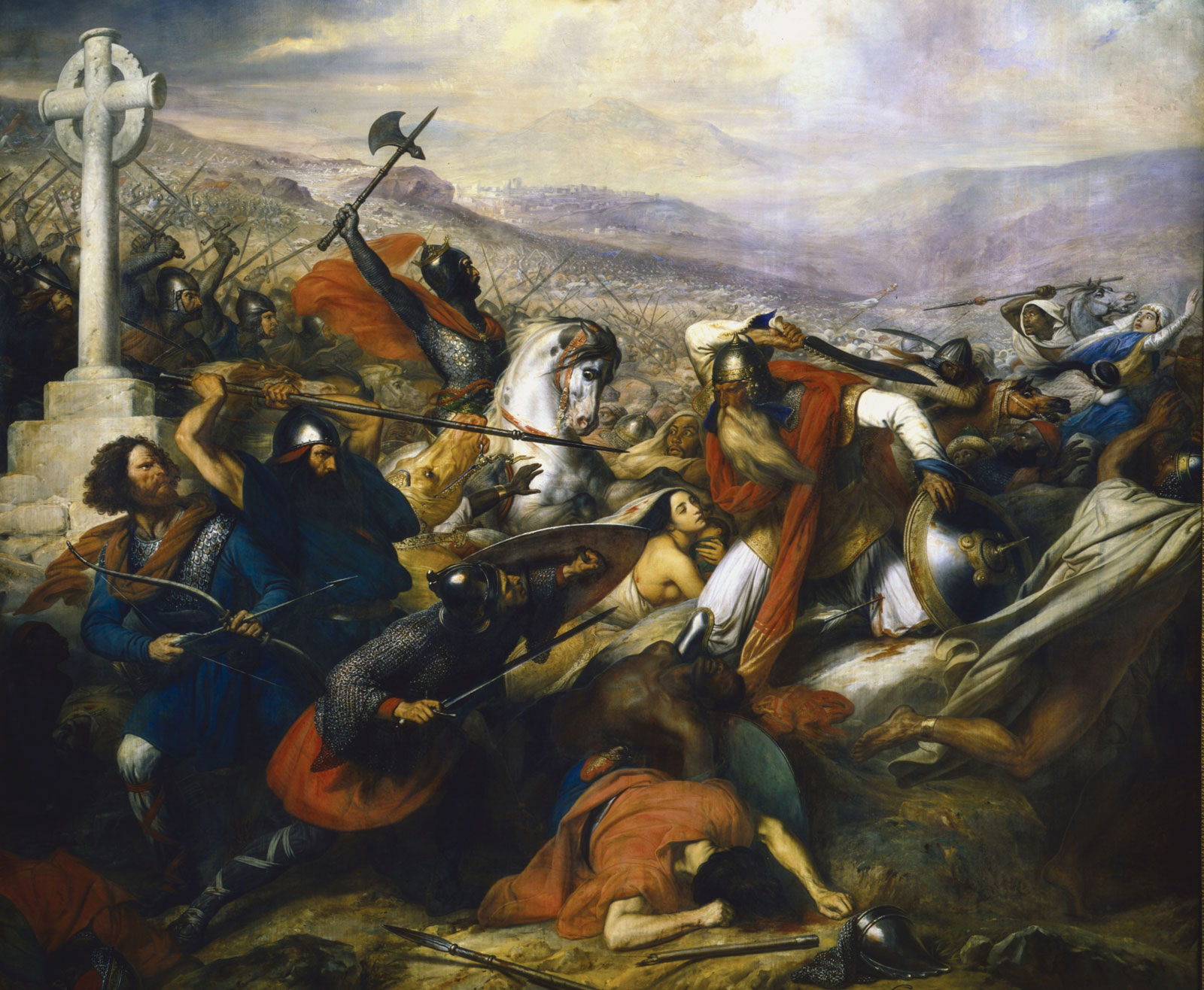
Along with the Battle of Tours in 732, the siege of Constantinople stopped the Muslim expansion into Europe

The failure of the Arab siege led to a profound change in the nature of warfare between Byzantium and the Caliphate. The Muslim goal of conquest of Constantinople was effectively abandoned, and the frontier between the two empires stabilized along the line of the Taurus and Antitaurus Mountains, over which both sides continued to launch regular raids and counter-raids. In this incessant border warfare, frontier towns and fortresses changed hands frequently, but the general outline of the border remained unaltered for over two centuries, until the Byzantine conquests of the 10th century. The eastern fleets of the Caliphate entered a century-long decline; only the Ifriqiyan fleets maintained regular raids on Byzantine Sicily, until they too subsided after 752. Indeed, with the exception of the advance of the Abbasid army under Harun al-Rashid up to Chrysopolis in 782, no other Arab army would ever come within sight of the Byzantine capital again. Consequently, on the Muslim side the raids themselves eventually acquired an almost ritual character, and were valued mostly as a demonstration of the continuing jihad and sponsored by the Caliph as a symbol of his role as the leader of the Muslim community.

The outcome of the siege was of considerable macrohistorical importance. The Byzantine capital's survival preserved the Empire as a bulwark against Islamic expansion into Europe until the 15th century, when it fell to the Ottoman Turks. Along with the Battle of Tours in 732, the successful defence of Constantinople has been seen as instrumental in stopping Muslim expansion into Europe. Historian Ekkehard Eickhoff writes that "had a victorious Caliph made Constantinople already at the beginning of the Middle Ages into the political capital of Islam, as happened at the end of the Middle Ages by the Ottomans—the consequences for Christian Europe [...] would have been incalculable", as the Mediterranean would have become an Arab lake, and the Germanic successor states in Western Europe would have been cut off from the Mediterranean roots of their culture. Military historian Paul K. Davis summed up the siege's importance as follows: "By turning back the Moslem invasion, Europe remained in Christian hands, and no serious Moslem threat to Europe existed until the fifteenth century. This victory, coincident with the Frankish victory at Tours (732), limited Islam's western expansion to the southern Mediterranean world." Thus the historian John B. Bury called 718 "an ecumenical date", while the Greek historian Spyridon Lambros likened the siege to the Battle of Marathon and Leo III to Miltiades. Consequently, military historians often include the siege in lists of the "decisive battles" of world history.

== Cultural impact ==
Among Arabs, the 717–718 siege became the most famous of their expeditions against Byzantium. Several accounts survive, but most were composed at later dates and are semi-fictional and contradictory. In legend, the defeat was transformed into a victory: Maslama departed only after symbolically entering the Byzantine capital on his horse accompanied by thirty riders, where Leo received him with honour and led him to the Hagia Sophia. After Leo paid homage to Maslama and promised tribute, Maslama and his troops—30,000 out of the original 80,000 that set out for Constantinople—departed for Syria. The tales of the siege influenced similar episodes in Arabic epic literature. A siege of Constantinople is found in the tale of Omar bin al-Nu'uman and his sons in the Thousand and One Nights, while both Maslama and the Caliph Sulayman appear in a tale of the Hundred and One Nights from the Maghreb. The commander of Maslama's bodyguard, Abdallah al-Battal, became a celebrated figure in Arab and Turkish poetry as "Battal Gazi" for his exploits in the Arab raids of the next decades. Similarly, the 10th-century epic Delhemma, related to the cycle around Battal, recounts a fictionalized version of the 717–718 siege.

Later Muslim and Byzantine tradition also ascribed the building of Constantinople's first mosque, near the city's praetorium, to Maslama. In reality, the mosque near the praetorium was probably erected in about 860, as a result of an Arab embassy in that year. Ottoman tradition also ascribed the building of the Arap Mosque (located outside Constantinople proper in Galata) to Maslama, although it erroneously dated this to around 686, probably confusing Maslama's attack with the first Arab siege in the 670s. The passing of the Arab army also left traces at Abydos, where "Maslama's Well" and a mosque attributed to him were still known in the 10th century.

Eventually, following their repeated failures before Constantinople, and the continued resilience of the Byzantine state, the Muslims began to project the fall of Constantinople to the distant future. Thus the city's fall came to be regarded as one of the signs of the arrival of the end times in Islamic eschatology. The siege became a motif in Byzantine apocalyptic literature as well, with decisive final battles against the Arabs before the walls of Constantinople being featured in the early 8th-century Greek translation of the Syriac Apocalypse of Pseudo-Methodius and the Apocalypse of Daniel, written either at about the time of the siege or a century later.
