= Theodosius III =

Byzantine emperor from 715 to 717

- Emperor of the Romans
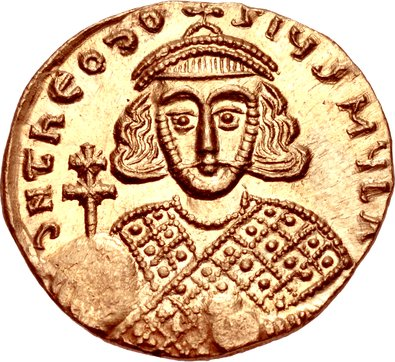
- Solidus of Theodosius III. The inscription reads d n theodosius mul a.

Byzantine emperor
- Reign: c. May 715 – 25 March 717
- Predecessor: Anastasius II
- Successor: Leo III
- Died: After 717, possibly on 24 July 754
- Issue: Theodosius
- Dynasty: Twenty Years' Anarchy
- Father: Tiberius III?

Theodosius III (Greek: Θεοδόσιος, romanized: Theodósios) was the Byzantine emperor from c. May 715 to 25 March 717. Before rising to power and seizing the throne of the Byzantine Empire, he was a tax collector in Adramyttium. In 715, the Byzantine navy and the troops of the Opsician Theme, one of the Byzantine provinces, revolted against Emperor Anastasius II (r. 713–715), acclaiming the reluctant Theodosius as emperor. Theodosius led his troops to Chrysopolis and then Constantinople, the capital, seizing the city in November 715. Anastasius did not surrender until several months later, accepting exile in a monastery in return for safety. Many themes viewed Theodosius to be a puppet of the troops of the Opsician Theme, and his legitimacy was denied by the Anatolics and the Armeniacs under their respective strategoi (generals) Leo the Isaurian and Artabasdos.

Leo declared himself emperor in the summer of 716 and allied himself with the Umayyad Caliphate, the Islamic empire; Theodosius sought aid from the Bulgarians under Khan Tervel (r. 700–721), setting a firm border at Thrace and ceding the Zagoria region to the Bulgarians, as well as stipulating the payment of tribute to them. Leo then marched his troops to Constantinople, seizing the city of Nicomedia, and capturing many officials, including Theodosius's son, also named Theodosius. With his son in captivity, Theodosius took the advice of Patriarch Germanus and the Byzantine Senate, and negotiated with Leo, agreeing to abdicate and recognize Leo as emperor. Leo entered Constantinople and definitively seized power on 25 March 717, allowing Theodosius and his son to retire to a monastery. Exactly when Theodosius died is uncertain, but it may have been on 24 July 754.

== History ==
=== Background ===
A map of the Byzantine Empire during the Twenty Years' Anarchy

After the Umayyad Caliphate was repelled at the first Arab siege of Constantinople (674–678), the Arabs and Byzantines experienced a period of peace between each other. Hostilities were resumed by Byzantine Emperor Justinian II (r. 685–695, 705–711), resulting in a string of Arab victories. As a consequence, the Byzantines lost control over Armenia and the Caucasian principalities, and the Arabs gradually encroached upon the Byzantine borderlands. Annually, generals from the Caliphate would launch raids into Byzantine territory, seizing fortresses and towns. After 712, the defenses of the Byzantine Empire weakened, as Arab raids penetrated deeper into Byzantine Asia Minor, and Byzantine response to these raids became less common; much of the frontier became depopulated, as the inhabitants were either killed, enslaved, or driven away. A result of this was that many frontier forts, especially in Cilicia, were gradually abandoned. The success of these raids emboldened the Arabs, who prepared for a second assault against Constantinople as early as the reign of Caliph al-Walid I (r. 705–715). After his death, his successor, Sulayman (r. 715–717) continued planning the campaign, Sulayman began assembling his forces in late 716, on the plain of Dabiq, north of Aleppo, entrusting the command of these forces to his brother, Maslama ibn Abd al-Malik.

The Slavs and Bulgars also formed a growing threat to the northern frontier of the Byzantine Empire, threatening Byzantine control in the Balkans. During the rule of Byzantine Emperor Philippicus (r. 711–713), in 712, the Bulgarians under Khan Tervel advanced as far as the walls of Constantinople itself, plundering the surrounding country, including villas and estates near the capital, where the Byzantine elites often summered.

Theodosius came to power during a period called the Twenty Years' Anarchy, defined by struggles between the emperors and the elites, and political instability, with a rapid succession of emperors. The nobles of this time were often natives of Asia Minor, and rarely had a strong agenda beyond preventing the emperors from growing stronger and disrupting the status quo. The Twenty Years' Anarchy began when Emperor Justinian II was overthrown by Leontius (r. 695–698) in 695, ending the Heraclian dynasty, which had retained power for eighty years. During this period of anarchy, seven different emperors took the throne, including a restored Justinian for a time. The modern historian Romilly Jenkins states that between 695 and 717 the only competent emperors were Tiberius III (r. 698–705) and Anastasius II (r. 713–715). The crisis was ended by Emperor Leo III (r. 717–741), who overthrew Theodosius, and whose dynasty reigned for 85 years.

=== Rise to the throne ===
Sulayman's preparations, including his construction of a war fleet, were quickly noticed by the Byzantine Empire. Emperor Anastasius II began making preparations to defend against this new onslaught. This included sending the patrician and urban prefect, Daniel of Sinope, to spy on the Arabs, under the pretense of a diplomatic embassy, as well as shoring up the defences of Constantinople, and strengthening the Byzantine navy. The 9th-century Byzantine historian Theophanes states that in early 715 Anastasius II had commanded the navy to gather at Rhodes to then advance to Phoenix. (Note: Usually identified with modern Finike in Lycia, it may also be modern Fenaket across from Rhodes, or perhaps Phoenicia (modern Lebanon).) It was there that the troops of the Opsician Theme mutinied against their commander, John the Deacon, killing him before sailing for Adramyttium, in southwestern Asia Minor, and there declared Theodosius, a tax collector, as Emperor Theodosius III. The Zuqnin Chronicle states that Theodosius ruled under the regnal name Constantine, his full name being "Theodosius Constantinus". The historian J. B. Bury suggests that he was selected at random for little more than the fact that he already had an imperial-sounding name, was inoffensive, obscure but respectable, and could easily be controlled by the Opsicians. Graham Sumner, a Byzantologist, suggests that Theodosius might be the same person as Theodosius, the son of Emperor Tiberius III, therefore explaining why he might have been chosen by the troops, as he would have legitimacy from his father, himself made emperor by a naval revolt. Theodosius, the son of Tiberius, was bishop of Ephesus by c. 729, and held this position until his death, sometime around 24 July 754, and was a leading figure of the iconoclastic Council of Hieria in 754. Byzantine historians Cyril Mango and Roger Scott do not view this theory as likely, as it would mean that Theodosius lived for thirty more years after his abdication. Cyril Mango proposed that it was actually Theodosius III's son who became bishop, rather than the son of Tiberius.

Theodosius was allegedly unwilling to be emperor and according to Theophanes:

When the malefactors arrived at Adramyttium, being leaderless they found there a local man named Theodosius, a receiver of public revenues, non-political and a private citizen. They urged him to become Emperor. He, however, fled to the hills and hid. But they found him and forced him to accept acclamation as Emperor.

He was acclaimed as Emperor Theodosius III by the troops of the Opsician Theme at Adramyttium in c. May 715. Anastasius led his army into Bithynia in the Opsician Theme to crush the rebellion. Rather than remaining to fight Anastasius, Theodosius led his fleet to Chrysopolis, across the Bosporus from Constantinople. From Chrysopolis, he launched a six-month-long siege of Constantinople, before supporters within the capital managed to open the gates for him, allowing him to seize the city in November 715. Anastasius remained at Nicaea for several months, before finally agreeing to abdicate and retire to a monastery.

=== Reign ===
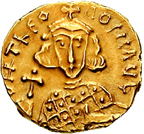
Coin of Theodosius with the title augustus

One of Theodosius's first acts as emperor was to reinstate the depiction of the Sixth Ecumenical Synod in the Great Palace of Constantinople, which Emperor Philippicus Bardanes had removed, earning himself the epithet of "Orthodox" in the Liber Pontificalis for this action. (Note: Some sources, such as George Ostrogorsky, state that Anastasius II was the first to reinstate the image of the Sixth Ecumenical Synod, citing Agathon the Diacon.) Theodosius, whom Byzantine sources convey as being both unwilling and incapable, was viewed by many of his subjects as a puppet emperor of the troops of the Opsician Theme. Thus he was not recognized as legitimate by the Anatolic and the Armeniac Themes, under their respective strategoi (generals) Leo the Isaurian and Artabasdos. Although they had not taken any action to prevent the overthrowal of Anastasius, they took issue with Theodosius's ascension, and Leo proclaimed himself Byzantine emperor in the summer of 716. He also sought the support of the Arabs, who viewed the Byzantine disunity as advantageous, and thought the confusion would weaken the Byzantine Empire and make it easier to take Constantinople. Theodosius negotiated a treaty with the Bulgarian khan Tervel (r. 700–721), likely to secure his support against an imminent Arab attack. The treaty fixed the border between the Byzantine Empire and the Bulgarian Empire at Thrace, ceding the Zagoria region to the Bulgarians, as well as stipulating the payment of tribute to the Bulgarians, the return of fugitives, and some trade agreements.

Around this time, Sulayman had begun advancing into Byzantine territory, laying siege to Amorium, and a separate force entered Cappadocia. Negotiations with Leo led them to withdraw. Leo began to march his troops to Constantinople soon after declaring himself emperor, first capturing Nicomedia, where he found and captured, among other officials, Theodosius's son, and then marched to Chrysopolis. After his son was captured, Theodosius, taking the advice of Patriarch Germanus and the Byzantine Senate, agreed to abdicate and recognize Leo as emperor. Bury states that the elite of Constantinople, who might otherwise have sided with the inoffensive Theodosius, who would be unlikely to politically weaken them, sided with Leo, as Theodosius was not competent enough to deal with the Arab threat. He further states that the meeting of the Patriarch, senate, and chief officials, which chose Leo over Theodosius, was done with the knowledge and consent of Theodosius himself, who accepted the decision. Bury postulates that, without the threat of the Arabs, it is possible that Theodosius may have retained power, and a succession of nominal emperors might have followed him, controlled by court officials and the elites.

Leo entered Constantinople and definitively seized power on 25 March 717, allowing Theodosius and his son, also named Theodosius, to retire to a monastery as monks. After his retirement to a monastery, Theodosius might have become the bishop of Ephesus, if he was the same person as Theodosius, son of Tiberius, in c. 729, and, if he is the same, died on 24 July 754 according to Sumner. Either he or his son is buried in the Church of St. Philip in Ephesus. Little is known of the reign of Theodosius III.

Regnal titles
Preceded by Anastasius II	Byzantine emperor May 715 – 25 March 717	Succeeded by Leo III
Political offices
Vacant Title last held by Anastasius II	Roman consul 716	Vacant Title next held by Leo III
