= Byzantine–Bulgarian treaty of 716 =

716 treaty between Bulgaria and the Byzantine Empire

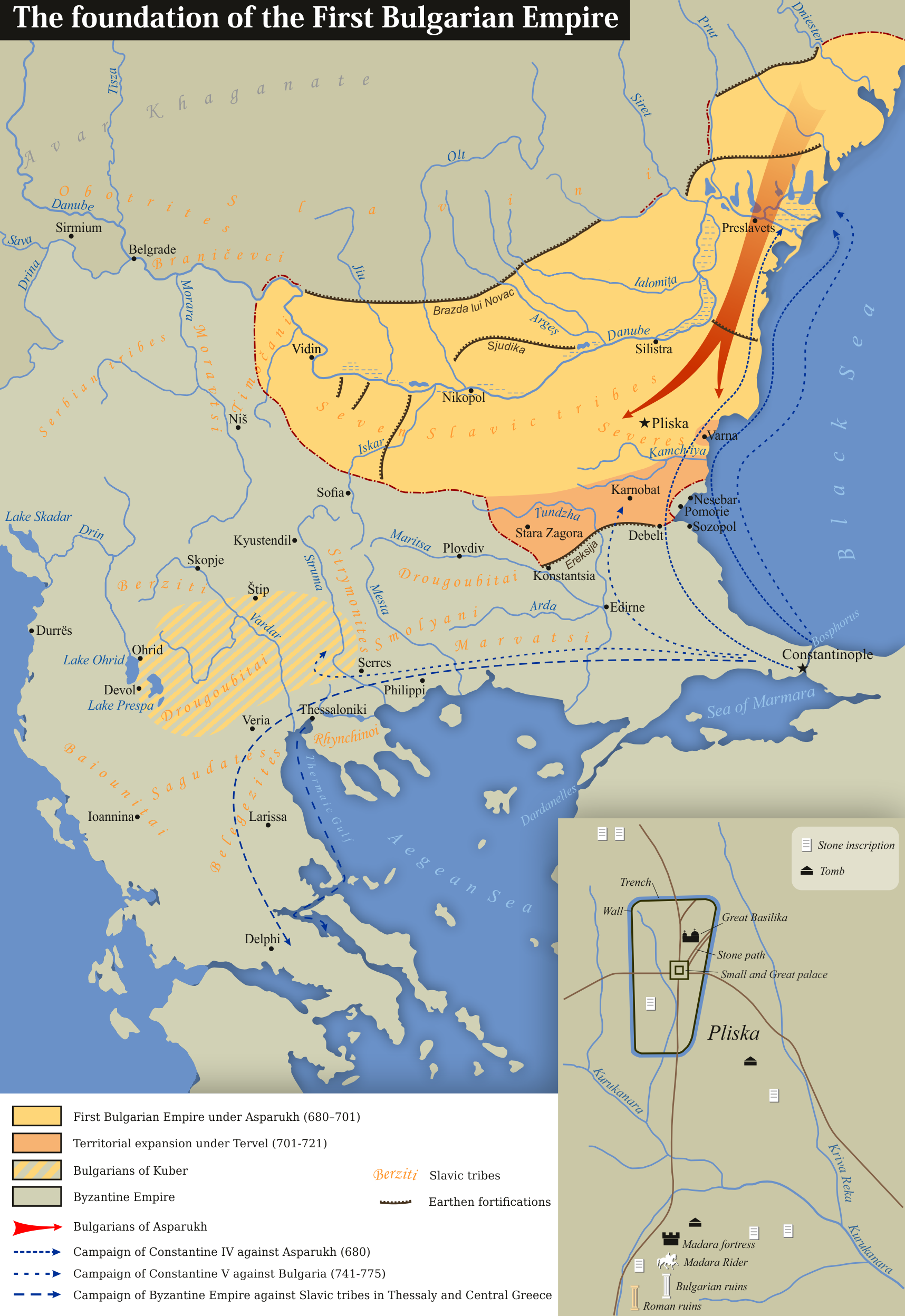
Bulgaria and the Byzantine Empire in 716 after the treaty.

The Treaty of 716 was an agreement between Bulgaria and the Byzantine Empire. It was signed by the son of the ruling Bulgarian Khan Tervel, Kormesiy and the Byzantine Emperor Theodosius III.

== Background ==
In 705 AD, the deposed Byzantine emperor Justinian II asked the Bulgarian khan Tervel for assistance to regain his throne. The Bulgarians sent 15,000-strong army and Justinian entered Constantinople. Tervel was awarded with the title Caesar, a huge amount of gold, silver and garments as well as the region called Zagore to the south of Stara Planina. However, when Justinian II stabilized his position in Constantinople he invaded Bulgaria to retake the lost territory but was defeated in the Battle of Anchialus (708) and later executed by his political rivals. The hostilities continued until 716 when the treaty was signed between the Bulgarians and Byzantines.

== Settlements ==
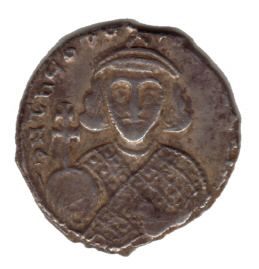
Emperor Theodosius III.

The terms of the treaty of 716 were:

- The Byzantine Empire recognized the Bulgarian borders including the newly gained lands of Zagore. In the treaty, the border between the two countries was stated as beginning at Mileoni in Thrace. However, Mileoni cannot be identified in the text but it obviously stands as a geographical term. According to Konstantin Jireček, Mileoni should be identified with one of the peaks of the Manastir Heights on the northern foothills of the Sakar Mountain. On the highest peak (590 m) there are ruins of a fortress of a type typical for a Byzantine border outpost and most probably it served as a border point. The border was defined by means of a trench (Erkesiya), known in the Middle Ages as the "big trench". It began from the lagoons around the Mandra Lake to the north of the ruins of Debelt and ran westwards to the Maritsa River with a length of 131 km.
- The Byzantine Empire must continue to pay annual tribute to Bulgaria. The annual tribute agreed in 679 between Asparukh and Constantine IV and confirmed by Justinian II was reaffirmed.
- Both countries agreed to exchange refugees charged with conspiracy against the legal ruler. This term was pushed by Theodosius III because his authority was not stable and the Bulgarians had in the past helped rebels to take the imperial crown.
- Goods could only be imported or exported when provided with a state seal. Goods without documents were to be confiscated for the state treasury. The Bulgarian merchants gained official access to Europe's largest market in Constantinople.

== Aftermath ==
The treaty was in Bulgaria's favour but it proved to be vital for the Byzantine Empire. Based on that agreement the Bulgarians sent an army to relieve the Second Arab siege of Constantinople and ambushed an Arab force near the city, another Arab force sent by Caliph Sulayman arrived in 717 under ‘Ubayda ibn Qays Al-‘Uqayli, and met the Bulgars in a victorious battle, Arab sources mention the conquest of a city called “Madīnat al-Saqāliba” (City of The Slavs).

In 719 Tervel withdrew his support for the new pretender for the Byzantine throne Anastasius. The treaty lasted until 756 when the Bulgarian Khan Kormisosh asked for tribute for the newly constructed Byzantine border fortifications but his envoy was ignored. A long period of Byzantine–Bulgarian wars began which lasted with interruptions for more than half a century. Despite the initial Byzantine successes in 792, 811 and 813 they suffered crushing defeats. A year before the battle of Versinikia in 813 Khan Krum offered the Byzantines to reestablish the Treaty of 716. However, his offer was declined because of the third point of the treaty concerning the exchange of political refugees. The Byzantines still had illusions that they could interfere in the Bulgarian internal affairs after the series of weak and short-ruled Bulgarian khans in the second half of the 8th century. After the death of Krum, a new 30-year peace treaty was signed in 815 between the new Khan Omurtag and Leo V the Armenian.
