= Twenty Years' Anarchy =

Period of acute internal instability in the Byzantine Empire from 695 to 717

Byzantine Empire Βασιλεία Ῥωμαίων (Ancient Greek) Imperium Romanum (Latin)
- 695–717
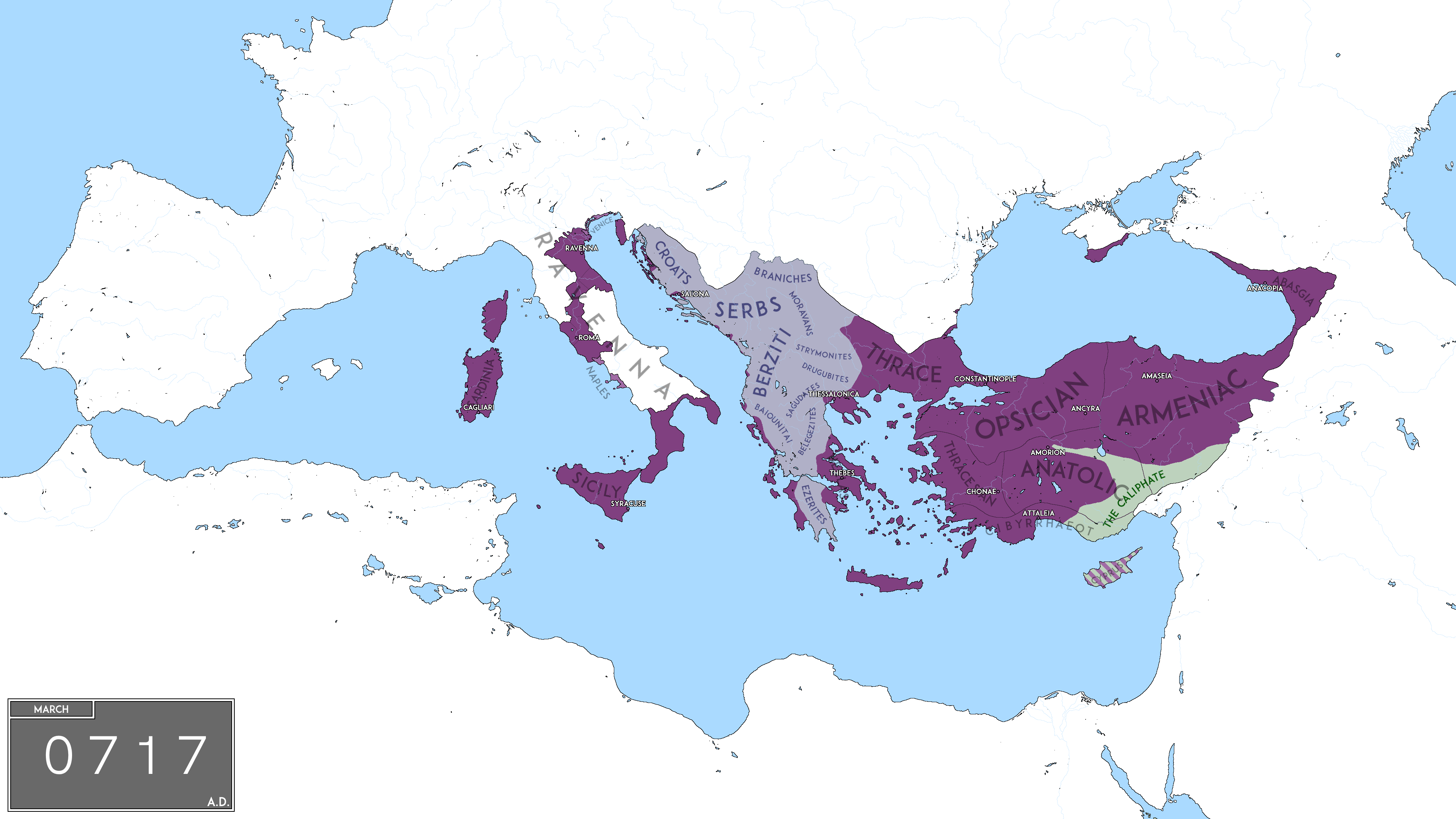
- The Byzantine Empire by the end of the Twenty Years' Anarchy in 717 AD.
- Capital: Constantinople
- Common languages: Greek; Latin
- Religion: Chalcedonian Christianity
- Government: Monarchy
- Emperor
  - 695–698: Leontius
  - 698–705: Tiberius III
  - 705–711: Justinian II (restored; second term)
  - 711–713: Philippicus
  - 713–715: Anastasius II
  - 715–717: Theodosius III
- History
  - First deposition of Justinian II: 695
  - Deposition of Theodosius III: 717
Preceded by	Succeeded by
Byzantine Empire under the Heraclian dynasty	Byzantine Empire under the Isaurian dynasty

The Twenty Years' Anarchy is a historiographic term used by some modern scholars for the period of acute internal instability in the Byzantine Empire, marked by the rapid succession of several emperors to the throne. It began with the first deposition of Justinian II in 695 and ended in 717, when Leo III the Isaurian took power and inaugurated the Isaurian dynasty.

== Justinian II and the usurpers - 685–711 ==
The reign of Justinian II (685–711) became increasingly despotic and violent, and his policies met with considerable opposition. He was eventually deposed and exiled by Leontius (695–698) in 695, precipitating a prolonged period of instability and anarchy, with seven emperors in twenty-two years.

Leontius was popular at first, but his reputation was ruined in 698 when a failed naval expedition led to the loss of Carthage. Fearing punishment from Leontius, the expedition army helped Tiberius III to overthrow him. While Tiberius (698–705) worked to bolster the eastern frontier and reinforce the defenses of Constantinople, Justinian was conspiring to make a comeback. Allied with the Bulgars, he recaptured Constantinople and executed Tiberius.

Justinian dealt brutally with Tiberius's supporters, and his ensuing reign of six years (705–711) was marked by similar cruelty. He lost the ground regained by Tiberius in the east, and imposed his views on the Pope. The historical role of consul was merged with the other titles of the basileus, taking the Byzantine Empire yet further from its origins and strengthening the Emperor's constitutional position as absolute monarch. In 711 Justinian was overthrown again by the rebellion of Philippicus (711–713). Justinian was captured and executed as was his son and co-emperor, Tiberius (706–711), thus extinguishing the Heraclian line.

== Philippicus - 711–713 ==
Philippicus' rebellion extended beyond politics to religion, deposing the Patriarch Cyrus, reestablishing Monothelitism and overturning the Sixth Ecumenical Council, which in turn alienated the empire from Rome. Militarily the Bulgars reached the walls of Constantinople, and moving troops to defend the capital allowed the Arabs to make incursions in the east. His reign ended abruptly when an army rebellion deposed him and replaced him with Anastasius II (713–715).

== Anastasius II - 713–715 ==
Anastasius reversed his predecessor's religious policies and responded to Arab attacks by sea and land, this time reaching as far as Galatia in 714, with some success. However, the very army that had placed him on the throne (the Opsikion army) rose against him, proclaimed a new emperor and besieged Constantinople for six months, eventually forcing Anastasius to flee.

== Theodosius III - 715–717 ==
The troops had proclaimed Theodosius III (715–717) as the new emperor, and once he had overcome Anastasius was almost immediately faced with the Arab preparations for the siege of Constantinople (717–718), forcing him to seek assistance from the Bulgars. He in turn faced rebellion from two other themata, Anatolikon and Armeniakon in 717, and chose to resign, being succeeded by Leo III the Isaurian (717–741) bringing an end to the cycle of violence and instability.

Unlike the neighboring Sasanian Empire, which had swiftly collapsed under the Arab threat, the Byzantine Empire survived despite its internal problems and the presence of enemies on two fronts. This was made possible by the strength of the empire's military organization, and by factional struggles within the Arab world.

== See also ==
- Arab–Byzantine wars
- Byzantine–Bulgarian Wars#Tervel's wars
- Family tree of Byzantine emperors

== Sources ==
- Kaegi, Walter Emil (1992). Byzantium and the Early Islamic Conquests. Cambridge, United Kingdom: Cambridge University Press. ISBN 978-0-521-41172-1.
- Bellinger, Alfred Raymond; Grierson, Philip, eds. (1992). Catalogue of the Byzantine Coins in the Dumbarton Oaks Collection and in the Whittemore Collection: Phocas to Theodosius III, 602–717. Part 1. Phocas and Heraclius (602–641). Dumbarton Oaks. ISBN 9780884020240.
- Jenkins, Romilly (1966). Byzantium The Imperial centuries AD 610–1071. Weidenfeld & Nicolson ISBN 0-8020-6667-4
