= Anastasius II (emperor) =

Byzantine emperor from 713 to 715

- Emperor of the Romans
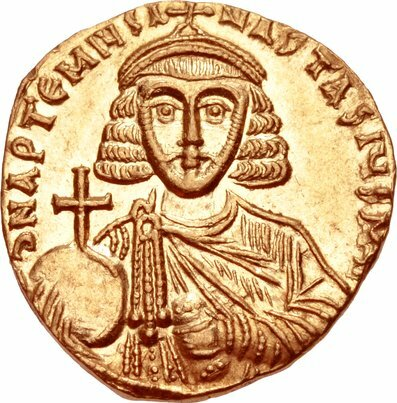
- Solidus of Anastasius II. The inscription reads d n artemius anastasius mul a.

Byzantine emperor
- Reign: 4 June 713 – late 715
- Predecessor: Philippicus
- Successor: Theodosius III
- Died: 1 June 719; Church of the Holy Apostles, Constantinople (now Istanbul, Turkey)
- Spouse: Irene
Regnal name
- Artemius Anastasius
- Dynasty: Twenty Years' Anarchy

Anastasius II (Greek: Ἀναστάσιος, romanized: Anastásios; died 719), born Artemius (Greek: Ἀρτέμιος, romanized: Artémios), was the Byzantine emperor from 713 to 715. His reign was marked by significant religious and political decisions aimed at stabilizing the Empire. One of his notable actions was reversing the previous appointment of a Monothelete patriarch of Constantinople, instead reinstating Orthodoxy by appointing Germanus I to the position. This move was made in an effort to gain the favor of Pope Constantine.

Anastasius II dedicated his efforts to fortifying the Empire and fostering a period of stability. However, his reign was cut short when he was deposed by Theodosius III during the Byzantine campaign against the Umayyad Caliphate in 715. Undeterred, four years later, in 719, Anastasius launched a rebellion against Leo III the Isaurian in a bid to reclaim the imperial throne.

Initially, Anastasius received support from Tervel of Bulgaria, who provided soldiers and funds for his cause. However, the situation took a turn when Anastasius failed to enter Constantinople, and the Bulgarian forces he had brought with him complied with a request from Leo III to hand over Anastasius and his allies. Consequently, Anastasius was executed alongside other members of the rebellion in 719.

== Biography ==
Anastasius, originally named Artemios (Greek: Ἀρτέμιος; male form of Artemis) held prominent positions as a bureaucrat and Imperial secretary (asekretis) under preceding emperors. His tenure coincided with a period of turmoil and instability in the Byzantine Empire known as The Twenty Years' Anarchy. Following the initial removal of the last hereditary ruler, Justinian II, the empire experienced a rapid succession of four rulers from 695 to 713. The fourth ruler, Philippicus, successfully deposed Justinian II for the second time.

Philippicus adopted policies that proved unfavorable to the majority of the empire's population, who adhered to Orthodoxy. Notably, he deposed the Orthodox patriarch of Constantinople in favor of a Monothelete patriarch. This decision garnered significant opposition both within the empire, particularly among the Orthodox populace, and from the church in Rome. Additionally, Philippicus diverted military resources from Anatolia to the Balkans in an attempt to defend Constantinople against the Bulgars. However, this shift left the empire's eastern front vulnerable to the Umayyad Caliphate's advancements. Consequently, Philippicus faced widespread discontent during his reign. All these things caused Philippicus’s reign to be plagued with discontent among the populace.

In 713, the troops belonging to the Opsikion Theme stationed in Thrace rose up against Emperor Philippicus. To prevent him from leading a counter-rebellion and due to the traditional requirement of physical flawlessness for an emperor, Philippicus was blinded. This act aimed to disqualify him both culturally and practically from ever reclaiming the throne. The day after the blinding, the conspirators selected Artemios as the new emperor, who subsequently adopted the regnal name Anastasius. Like his predecessor, Anastasius ascended the throne under similar circumstances, which also posed the possibility of a comparable downfall.

To consolidate this position and maintain stability within the military, crucial for thwarting future coups and retaining Imperial control, Anastasius took decisive measures. He had the officers directly responsible for plotting against Philippicus blinded and exiled. This action served as a deterrent against future rebellions, ensuring that Anastasius could maintain his rule and prevent further unrest.

=== Rule ===
During Anastasius's reign, his primary focus was on stabilizing the Byzantine Empire. One of his key objectives was to reverse the religious reforms implemented by his predecessor. In line with this goal, Anastasius supported the decisions of the Sixth Ecumenical Council and removed the Monothelete Patriarch John VI of Constantinople from his position. He replaced him with the orthodox Patriarch Germanus in 715. This strategic move had several purposes. Firstly, it helped to pacify the unrest among the Orthodox population in Constantinople. Furthermore, it enhanced Anastasius's legitimacy as the emperor, which was particularly important considering his rise to power through a rebellion. To maintain imperial authority and stability, he sought various forms of proof of legitimacy. Elevating Orthodoxy effectively resolved the short-lived schism between the monarchy and the catholic Church, which was consistent with the Byzantine emperors' attempts to reconcile with Rome. Gaining the approval of Pope Constantine would have provided Anastasius with a symbol of legitimacy that his predecessor lacked, thereby reinforcing his own legitimacy by comparison.

In addition to his religion reforms, Anastasius recognized the need to address the precarious state of the Byzantine Empire's defenses and the issue of territorial loss. The Umayyad Caliphate posed a significant threat, surrounding the Empire both by land and sea. Their incursions had reached as far as Galatia in 714. In response, Anastasius pursued diplomatic avenues to restore peace but found his emissaries unsuccessful in Damascus. Consequently, he initiated a comprehensive defensive strategy. This involved the restoration of Constantinople's walls, the construction of siege equipment, the stockpiling of food, and the rebuilding of the Byzantine fleet. The death of Caliph al-Walid I in 715 presented an opportunity for Anastasius to reverse the situation in his favor. He dispatched an army under Leo the Isaurian, who would later become emperor, to invade Syria. Simultaneously, he ordered his fleet to concentrate on Rhodes, with instructions not only to resist the enemy's approach but also to destroy their naval resources. Retaking the territories lost to the Caliphate served both practical advantages, such as expanding the empire's borders, and symbolic purposes, showcasing the strength of the new regime.

=== Deposition ===
In Rhodes, a revolt occurred among the Opsician troops due to their discontent with the actions of Anastasius following his rise to power. During this mutiny, Admiral John was killed. Subsequently, the mutineers decided to overthrow Anastasius and install a new Emperor, Theodosius III (also known as Theodosios). Theodosius III, who was a relatively unknown tax-collector, was proclaimed as the new emperor. Following a siege that lasted six months, Constantinople was captured by Theodosius. Meanwhile, Anastasius had fled to Nicaea but was eventually compelled to yield to the authority of the new emperor. He retired to a monastery in Thessalonica. Theophanes the Confessor reports that Anastasius's reign lasted for 1 year and 3 months, suggesting his removal from power in September 715. However, an alternative date of November 715 is also possible.

=== Rebellion ===
Theodosius, the reigning emperor, was later deposed by Leo III, who had previously served under Anastasius. Leo would face two successive crises during his rule. The first crisis occurred when the Umayyad Caliphate besieged Constantinople, causing confusion about whether the city had been conquered. Troops stationed in Sicily declared their support for a new emperor, mistakenly believing that the capital had fallen. Although their rebellion was suppressed, the siege and the subsequent rebellion created an appearance of weakness in Leo's new government. Observing this, Anastasius decided to rebel and reclaim the Byzantine throne.

In 719, Anastasius left Thessalonica to lead a revolt against Leo III. The instigator of the rebellion is a matter of debate, with conflicting accounts from Patriarch Nikephoros and Theophanes the Confessor. Nikephoros claims that Anastasius orchestrated the plot himself, while Theophanes suggests that Niketas Xylinites initiated the rebellion by corresponding with Anastasius. Regardless, Anastasius sought support from Tervel of Bulgaria and received a significant number of troops, as well as financial aid amounting to 50,000 litres of gold. However, Theophanes the Confessor, who provides this information elsewhere, mistakenly confuses Tervel with his eventual successor Kormesiy, leaving the possibility that Anastasius formed an alliance with the younger ruler. Another explanation posits that Kormesiy acted as a representative of Tervel during negotiations with Anastasius.

Although the coups during the Twenty Years Anarchy had seen some success, rebellions carried a high risk of failure. Therefore, Anastasius must have had a compelling reason to believe that the risk was worth taking. One explanation is that he interpreted the siege of Constantinople and the minor rebellion as indications of the state's weakness, making him believe that a rebellion could succeed. Another possibility is that Anastasius genuinely believed that the Empire was in a state of crisis and that he was one of the few individuals capable of saving it. Lastly, it is plausible that Theophanes was accurate in asserting that Niketas Xylinites advised Anastasius to rebel.

With the Bulgarian forces by his side, Anastasius marched toward Constantinople. He had sent a message to Niketas Anthrakas, the commander of the city walls, requesting that the gates be opened upon his arrival. Unfortunately for Anastasius, the message was intercepted, leading to Niketas being beheaded and foiling Anastasius's plan to enter Constantinople easily. Unable to breach the city, Anastasius and his conspirators were handed over, by the Bulgarians, to Leo III as requested. In 719, Anastasius was executed, along with other conspirators including Niketas Xylinitas and the archbishop of Thessalonica. Anastasius's wife Irene arranged for his burial in the Church of the Holy Apostles.

=== Historiography ===
Anastasius II received historical attention several decades after his death through the works of Theophanes the Confessor and Patriarch Nikephoros. These scholars, known for their extensive coverage of Byzantine history, incorporated Anastasius II into their writings, although their focus extended beyond his specific reign. Notably, their accounts primarily revolved around the rebellion initiated by Anastasius against Leo III. Due to the proximity of their writings to the actual event, Theophanes and Nikephoros are frequently consulted as primary sources for subsequent works about Anastasius.

As historical records progressed into the 1900s, Anastasius II's coverage tended to be contextualized within broader time periods. A common approach involved discussing his reign immediately following an account of his predecessor, Philippicus. In these records, Anastasius was often portrayed in a relatively favorable light compared to Philippicus. Additionally, some works addressing Bulgarian actions during Anastasius's lifetime also touched upon his reign.

More recent sources on Anastasius II exhibit sparser coverage, often limited to encyclopedic entries or discussions focusing on his relationship with Leo III. It is not uncommon to encounter brief mentions of Anastasius without delving into his character or achievements. One possible explanation for the limited amount of literature dedicated to Anastasius II is that Leo III is generally regarded as the emperor who succeeded where Anastasius fell short. Consequently, more works have emerged discussing Leo III and his accomplishments, leaving less scholarly attention devoted to Anastasius II. Furthermore, the brevity of Anastasius's reign, coupled with a scarcity of primary sources, could contribute to the relative lack of historical coverage he has received.

== See also ==
- List of Byzantine emperors
- Twenty Years' Anarchy

== Bibliography ==
- Burke, John, and Roger Scott, Byzantine Macedonia: Identity, Image, and History 13, Leiden: Brill, 2017.
- Bury, John B, The Cambridge Medieval History 2, edited by Henry M Gwatkin and James P Whitney, Macmillan press, 1913.
- Chisholm, Hugh. Encyclopaedia Britannica. 1, 11th ed, Cambridge University Press, 1911.
- Gregory, Timothy E. "Weak Emperors and Near Anarchy," in A History of Byzantium, 2nd ed., Malden, MA: Wiley-Blackwell, 2011.
- Grigoriou-Ioannidou, Martha. "Monoxyla, Slavs, Bulgars, and the Coup Organised by Artemios-Anastasios II." Balkan Stuides 39, no. 2 (1998): 181–95.
- Longworth, Philip, The Making of Eastern Europe: From Prehistory to Postcommunism, Basingstoke: Macmillan Press, 1999.
- Noahm. "Philippikos (711–713)." Dumbarton Oaks, August 19, 2020. https://www.doaks.org/resources/online-exhibits/gods-regents-on-earth-a-thousand-years-of-byzantine-imperial-seals/rulers-of-byzantium/philippikos-711201313.
- "Anastasius II (A.D.713-715)." Roman Emperors An Online Encyclopedia of Roman Rulers and Their Families, November 25, 2000. [https://www.roman-emperors.sites.luc.edu/anastasii.htm roman-emperors.org].
- Sheppard, Si, and Graham Turner, Constantinople AD 717-18: The Crucible of History, Oxford: Osprey Publishing, 2020.
- Sumner, Graham V. "Philippicus, Anastasius II and Theodosius III." Greek, Roman and Byzantine Studies 17 (1976).
- Torgerson, Jesse W. "Introduction," in The Chronographia of George the Synkellos and Theophanes: The Ends of Time in Ninth-Century Constantinople, Brill, 2022.

Regnal titles
Preceded by Philippicus	Byzantine emperor 4 June 713 – 715	Succeeded by Theodosius III
Political offices
Vacant Title last held by Philippicus	Roman consul 714	Vacant Title next held by Leo III
