= Tervel of Bulgaria =

Tervel

Khan of Bulgaria
- Reign: 700–721
- Predecessor: Asparukh
- Successor: Kormesiy
- Born: 675; Bulgarian Empire
- Died: 721; Bulgarian Empire
- House: Dulo
- Father: Asparukh
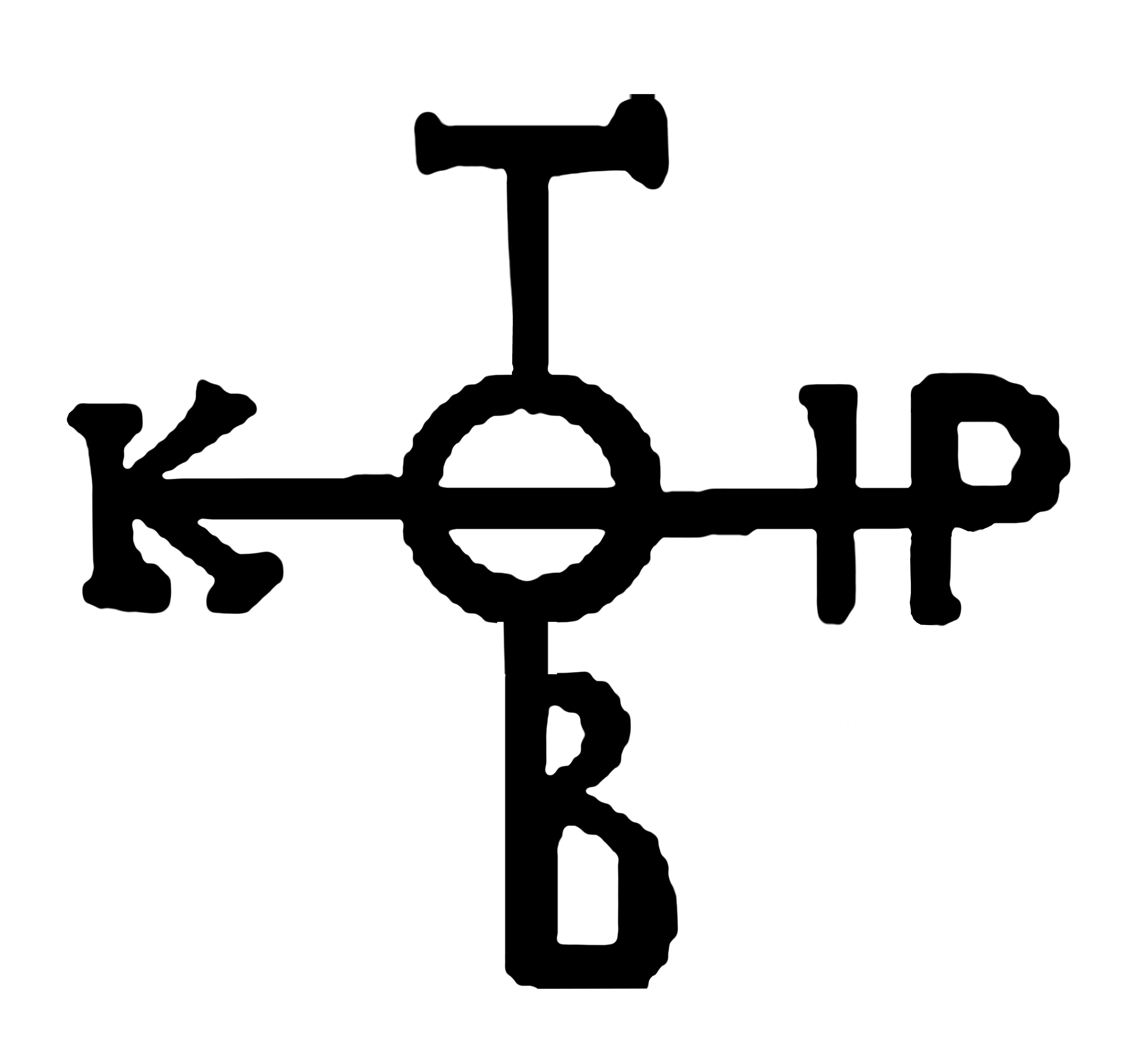
- Signature

Tervel (Bulgarian: Тервел), also called Tarvel, Terval, or Terbelis in Byzantine sources, was the ruler of Bulgaria during the First Bulgarian Empire at the beginning of the 8th century. In 705 Emperor Justinian II named him caesar, the first foreigner to receive this title. He was raised a pagan like his grandfather Khan Kubrat, but was later possibly baptised by the Byzantine clergy. Tervel played an important role in defeating the Arabs during the siege of Constantinople in 717–718. The Nominalia of the Bulgarian khans states that Tervel belonged to the Dulo clan and reigned for 21 years. The testimony of the source and some later traditions allow identifying Tervel as the son of Asparukh.

== Alliance with Justinian II ==
Tervel is first mentioned in the Byzantine sources in 704, when he was approached by the deposed and exiled Byzantine emperor Justinian II. Justinian acquired Tervel's support for an attempted restoration to the Byzantine throne in exchange for friendship, gifts, and his daughter in marriage. With an army of 15,000 horsemen provided by Tervel, Justinian suddenly advanced on Constantinople and managed to gain entrance into the city in 705. The restored emperor executed his supplanters, the emperors Leontius and Tiberius III, alongside many of their supporters. Justinian awarded Tervel with many gifts, the title of kaisar (caesar), which made him second only to the emperor and the first foreign ruler in Byzantine history to receive such a title, and a territorial concession in northeastern Thrace, a region called Zagora. Whether Justinian's daughter Anastasia was married to Tervel as had been arranged is unknown.

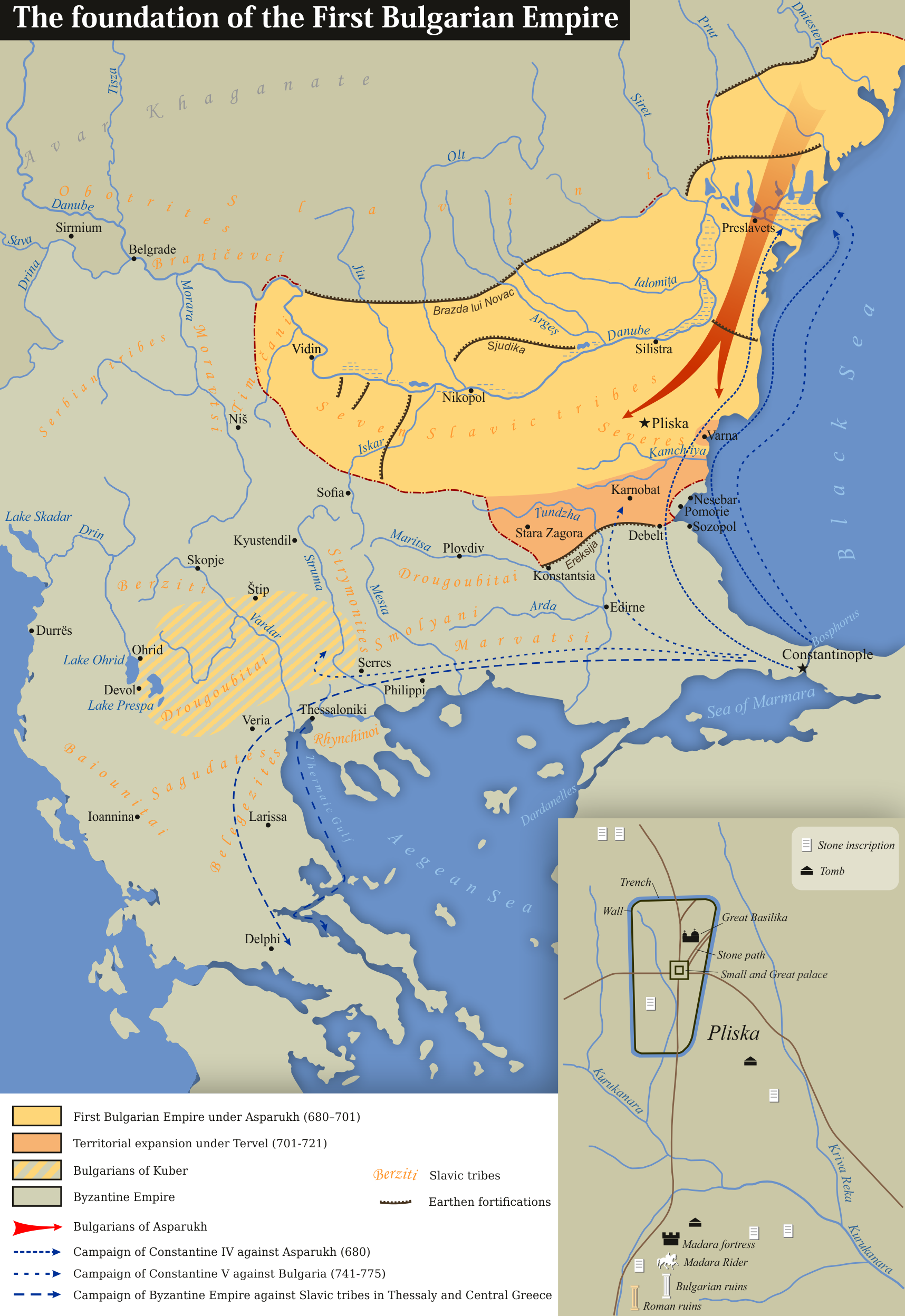
Bulgaria during the rule of Tervel. The territorial expansion of 705 can be seen on the map.

Only three years later, however, when Justinian II consolidated his throne he violated this arrangement and commenced military operations to recover the ceded area but Khan Tervel routed the Byzantines at the Battle of Anchialus (near present-day Pomorie) in 708. In 711, faced by a serious revolt in Asia Minor, Justinian again sought the aid of Tervel, but obtained only lukewarm support manifested in an army of 3,000. Outmaneuvered by the rebel emperor Philippicus, Justinian was captured and executed, while his Bulgarian allies were allowed to retire to their country. Tervel took advantage of the disorders in Byzantium and raided Thrace in 712, plundering as far as the vicinity of Constantinople.

Given the chronological information of the Imennik, Tervel would have died in 715. However, the Byzantine Chronicler Theophanes the Confessor ascribes Tervel a role in an attempt to restore the deposed Emperor Anastasius II in 718 or 719. If Tervel had survived this long, he would have been the Bulgarian ruler who concluded a new treaty (confirming the annual tribute paid by the Byzantines to Bulgaria, the territorial concessions in Thrace, regulating commercial relations and the treating of political refugees) with Emperor Theodosius III in 716. However, elsewhere Theophanes records the name of the Bulgarian ruler who concluded the treaty of 716 as Kormesios, i.e., Tervel's eventual successor Kormesiy. It is probable that the chronicler ascribed the events of 718 or 719 to Tervel simply because this was the last name of a Bulgar ruler that he was familiar with, and that his sources had been silent about the name, as in his account of the siege of Constantinople. According to another theory Kermesios was authorized by Tervel to sign the treaty.

Most researches agree that it was during the time of Tervel when the famous rock relief the Madara Rider was created as a memorial to the victories over the Byzantines, to honour his father Asparukh and as an expression of the glory of the Bulgarian state.

== The war with the Arabs in 717–718 and later life ==
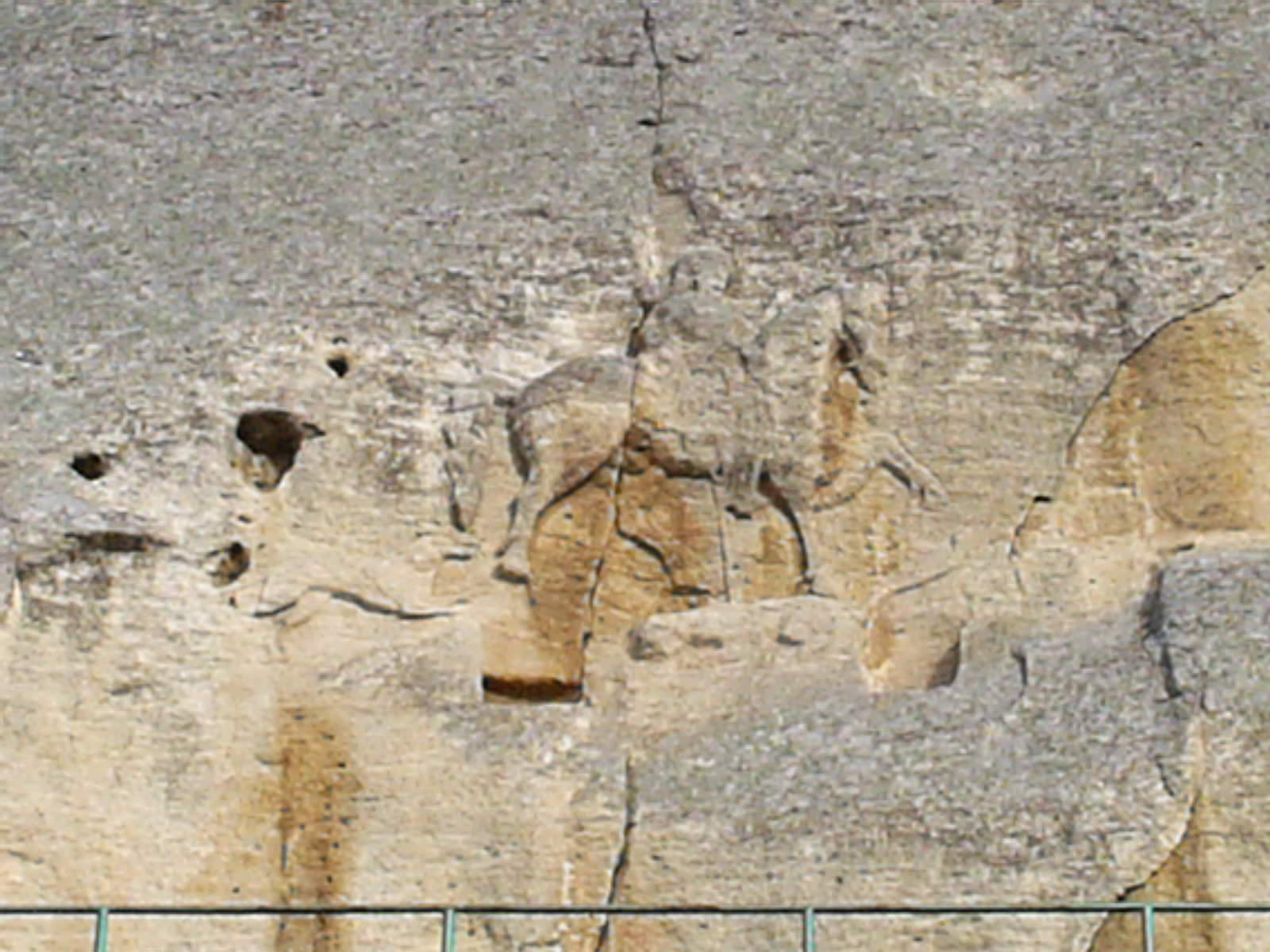
The Madara Rider.

On 25 May 717, Leo III the Isaurian was crowned Emperor of Byzantium. During the summer of the same year the Arabs, led by Maslama ibn Abd al-Malik, crossed the Dardanelles and besieged Constantinople with a large army and navy.

Leo III made a plea to Tervel for help, relying on the treaty of 716, and Tervel agreed. The first clash between the Bulgars and the Arabs ended with a Bulgar victory. During the very first stages of the siege the Bulgars appeared in the Muslim rear and large part of their army was destroyed and the rest were trapped. The Arabs built two trenches around their camp facing the Bulgarian army and the walls of the city. They persisted with the siege despite the severe winter with 100 days of snowfall. In the spring, the Byzantine navy destroyed the Arab fleets that had arrived with new provisions and equipment, while a Byzantine army defeated Arab reinforcements in Bithynia. Finally, in early summer the Arabs engaged the Bulgars in battle but suffered a crushing defeat. According to Theophanes the Confessor, the Bulgars slaughtered some 22,000 Arabs in the battle. Shortly after, the Arabs raised the siege.

In 719, Tervel again interfered in the internal affairs of the Byzantine Empire when the deposed emperor Anastasios II asked for his assistance to regain the throne. Tervel provided him with troops and 360,000 gold coins. Anastasios marched to Constantinople, but its population refused to cooperate. In the meantime Leo III sent a letter to Tervel in which he urged him to respect the treaty and to prefer peace to war. Because Anastasios was abandoned by his supporters, the Bulgarian ruler agreed to Leo III's pleas and broke relations with the usurper. He also sent Leo III many of the conspirators who had sought refuge in Pliska.

== The cult of St. Trivelius ==
In his Slav-Bulgarian History (1762), Paisius of Hilendar interprets Tervel's character based on a copperplate engraving from Hristofor Žefarović's Stemmatografia (1741), which depicts St. David, king of Bulgaria and St. Theoctistus. In the image of Saint Theoctistus, which is the monastic name of the Serbian king Stefan Dragutin, Paisius recognized King Trivelius or Tervel. Among other things, Paisius wrote about this Bulgarian ruler:

This king Trivelius was the first to accept Christianity in 703 AD. After receiving the holy faith, he had great piety and devotion to Christ. Because of this, he built a monastery for himself and voluntarily left the kingdom [...] and then took on the monastic rank. [...] His monastic name was Theoctist.

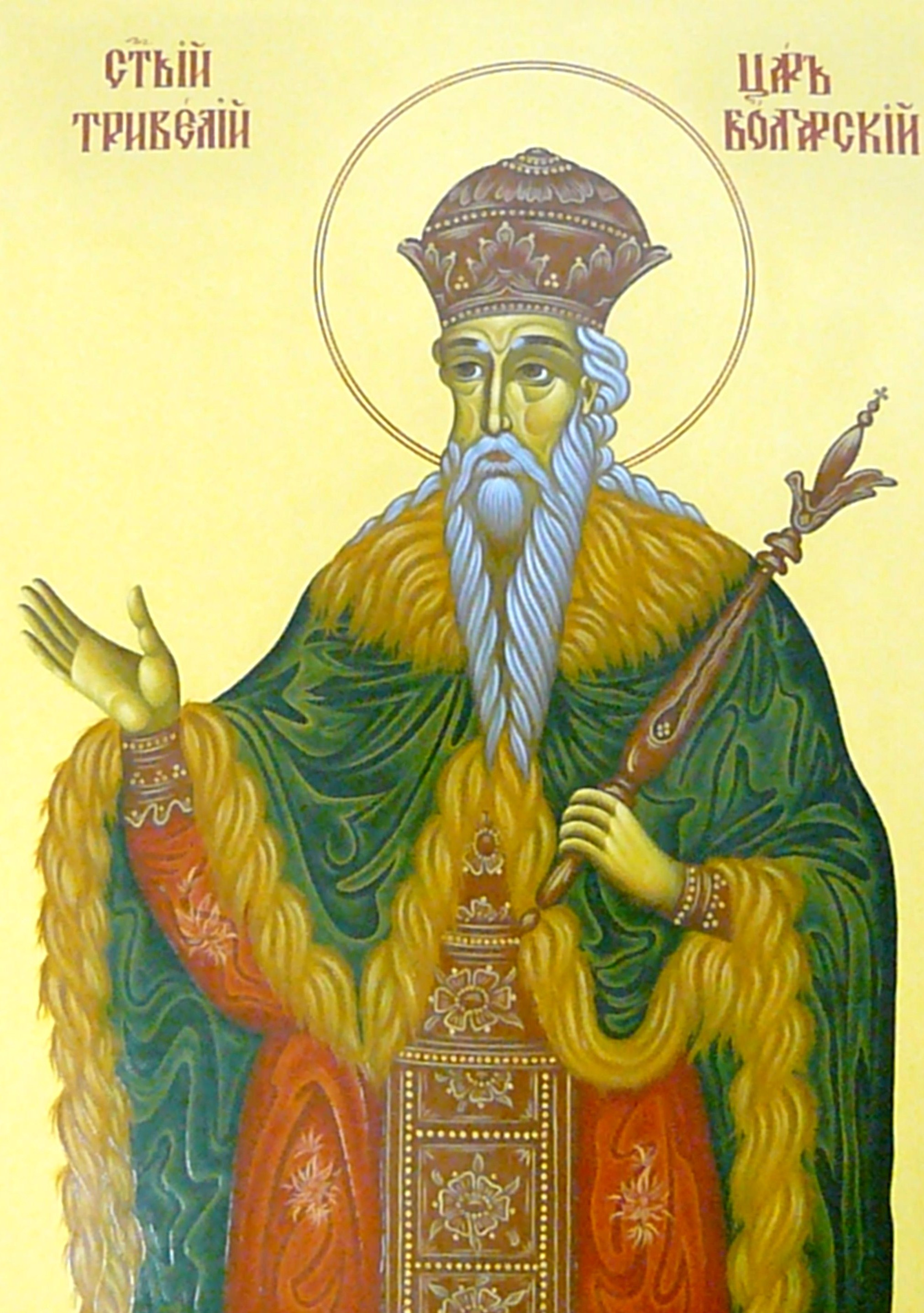
Icon of St. Trivelius

"Zographic History" (1760's) will even try to locate the monastery of St. Teoctist close to Ohrid, and the hieromonk Spiridon Gabrovski in his "Istoriya" from 1792, points out that in Ohrid "in his monastery until today lie his relics". It is striking that the "Zographic History" and "Slav-Bulgarian History", which appeared almost simultaneously, are the first texts that mention King Trivelius, in general, in Balkan literature, which is not the case in Western literature, where he has been strongly present since the 16th century. In the western literature, which was apparently also a source for the mentioned Athonian monks, there is also the episode about his monasticism, but in no source before the "History of Paisius" his monastic name is mentioned, which is obviously an original construction of Paisius in order to connect Trivelius with the figure of Theoctistus from the "Stematographia". In addition, it is important to emphasize that Paisius was aware of the fact that the Serbian king Dragutin received monasticism with the name Theoctistus, so it is even more surprising that he connected the figure of the monk Theoctistus from the "Stematographia" with the Bulgarian ruler Trivelius.

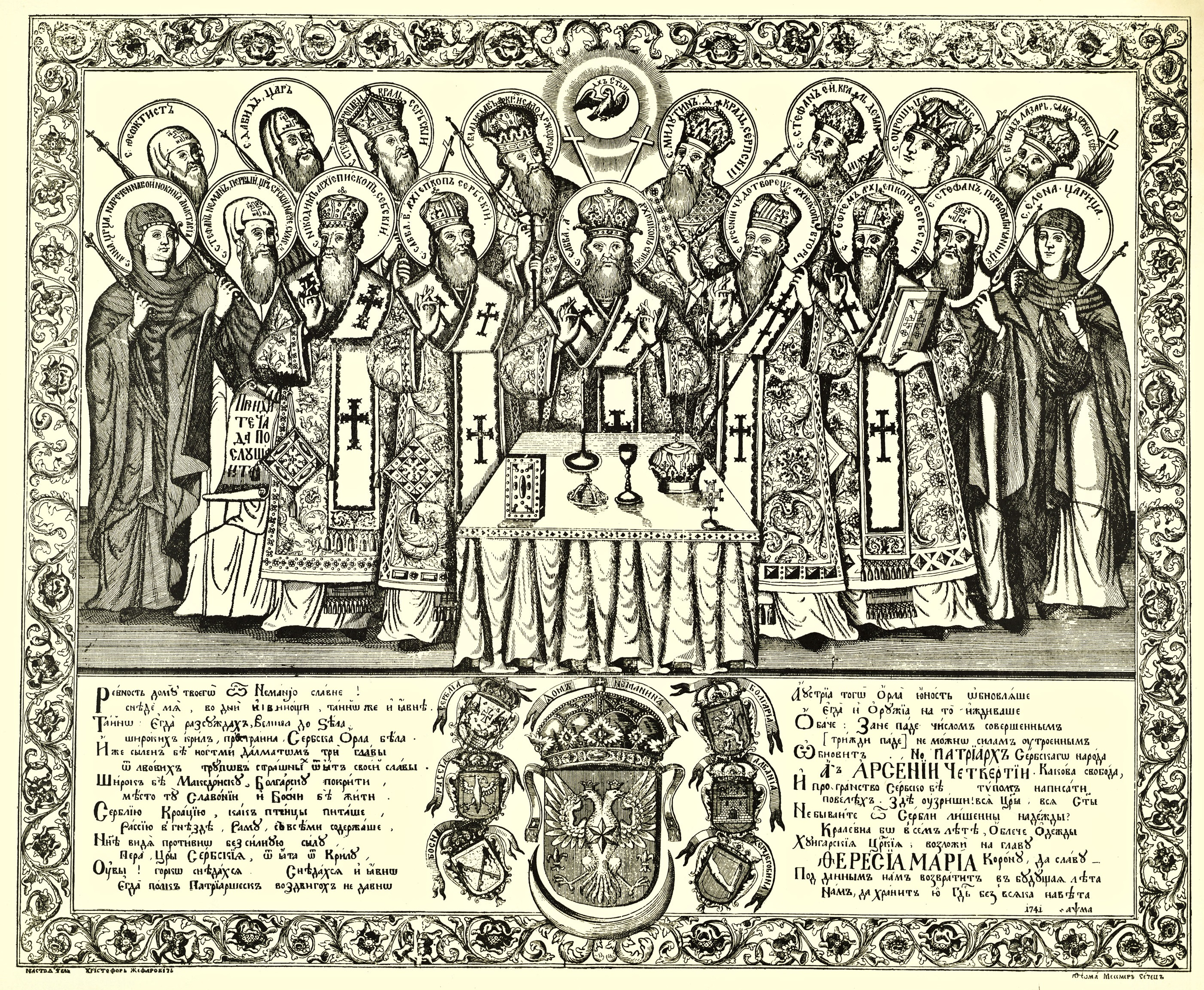
The House of Nemanja, engraving made by Hristofor Žefarović in 1741, a few months before the publication of the Stemmatografia. Saint Theoctistus is depicted on the upper left.

Another copperplate engraving by Žefarović from the same year 1741, which was made just a few months before the publication of the "Stemmatografia", is particularly useful for identifying the image of St. Theoctistus from the Stematography. This copperplate depicting Saint Sava with Serbian saints from the house of Nemanjic was conceived as a kind of propaganda political memorandum, and was sent as a congratulatory message to Empress Maria Theresa on the occasion of her ascension to the throne. Seventeen holy figures are represented on the copperplate. In the second row of saints, Saint Theoctistus is represented, with clearly written signatures. All the characters presented, without exception, find their analogy in the saints from the house of Nemanja, so such an analogy should be sought for the character of Saint Theoctist.

The interpretations by Paisius, by analogy and without critical analysis, will be taken up in the later Bulgarian literature and will create a fictitious and until then non-existent saint cult, which will be reflected in the paintings of the 18th and 19th centuries.

== Legacy ==
Tervel Peak on Livingston Island in the South Shetland Islands, Antarctica is named after Tervel of Bulgaria.

== See also ==
- History of Bulgaria
- Bulgars

Preceded by Asparukh	Khan of Bulgaria; 695–715	Succeeded by Kormesiy
