= Tiberius III =

Byzantine emperor from 698 to 705

- Emperor of the Romans
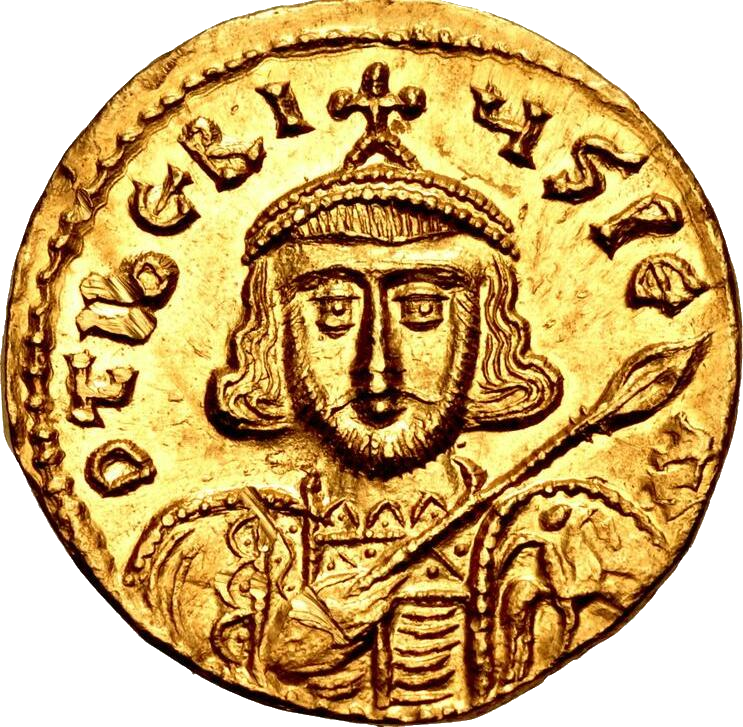
- Solidus bearing the image of Tiberius III

Byzantine emperor
- Reign: 698–705
- Predecessor: Leontius
- Successor: Justinian II
- Born: Apsimar
- Died: between August 705 and February 706; Constantinople
- Burial: Prote
- Issue: Theodosius (Theodosius III?); Heraclius? (Note: Some scholars, such as Walter Kaegi, identify Heraclius as Tiberius' son, rather than his brother.)
Regnal name
- Tiberius
- Period: Twenty Years' Anarchy

Tiberius III (Note: Tiberius is usually referred to as Tiberius III by modern historians, but is on other occasions called Tiberius II when the original Tiberius is excluded from the regnal count. Tiberius II Constantine is then enumerated as "Tiberius I".) (Greek: Τιβέριος, romanized: Tibérios), born Apsimar (Latin: Apsimarus; Greek: Ἀψίμαρος, romanized: Apsímaros), was Eastern Roman emperor from 698 to 705. Little is known about his early life, other than that he was a droungarios, a mid-level commander, who served in the Cibyrrhaeot Theme. In 696, Tiberius was part of an army sent by Byzantine Emperor Leontius to retake the North African city of Carthage, which had been captured by the Arab Umayyads. After seizing the city, this army was pushed back by Umayyad reinforcements and retreated to the island of Crete. As they feared the wrath of Leontius, some officers killed their commander, John the Patrician, and declared Tiberius the emperor. Tiberius swiftly gathered a fleet and sailed for Constantinople, where he then deposed Leontius. Tiberius did not attempt to retake Byzantine Africa from the Umayyads, but campaigned against them along the eastern border with some success. In 705, former emperor Justinian II, who had been deposed by Leontius, led an army of Slavs and Bulgars from the First Bulgarian Empire to Constantinople, and after entering the city secretly, deposed Tiberius. Tiberius fled to Bithynia, but was captured a few months later and beheaded by Justinian between August 705 and February 706. His body was initially thrown into the sea, but was later recovered and buried in a church on the island of Prote.

== History ==
=== Early life ===
Sparse details are known of Tiberius before the reign of Byzantine emperor Leontius (r. 695–698), except for his birth name, Apsimar, historically considered to be of Germanic origin. Some scholars, such as Alexander Vasiliev, have speculated that Tiberius was of Gotho-Greek origin. The historian Wolfram Brandes traces the traditional assumption of a Germanic origin to J. B. Bury, but argues that it is incorrect. The Byzantinists Anthony Bryer and Judith Herrin have suggested that the name Apsimar may be Slavic in origin, and the scholars Leslie Brubaker and John Haldon have suggested a Turkic origin. It is also known that he was a droungarios (a commander of about a thousand men) of the Cibyrrhaeot Theme, a military province in southern Anatolia. The Byzantinist Walter Kaegi states that Tiberius had won victories over the Slavs in the Balkans during his early military career, which granted him a degree of popularity.

=== Background ===
In 696, the Umayyad Caliphate renewed its attack upon the Exarchate of Africa of the Byzantine Empire, seizing the city of Carthage in 697. The Byzantine Emperor Leontius sent John the Patrician with an army to retake the city, which John accomplished after launching a surprise attack on its harbor. Despite this initial success, the city was swiftly retaken by Umayyad reinforcements, which forced John to retreat to the island of Crete to regroup. A group of officers who feared Leontius's wrath for failing to recapture Carthage killed John, and declared Apsimar emperor. Apsimar took the regnal name Tiberius; during this period, the selection of a regnal name was quite common, but later fell out of favor. He gathered a fleet and allied himself with the Greens (one of the Hippodrome sports and political factions), before sailing for Constantinople, which was enduring an outbreak of the bubonic plague. Tiberius and his troops landed at the port of Sykai on the Golden Horn, and then proceeded to lay siege to the city. After several months, the gates of Constantinople were opened for Tiberius's forces by members of the Green faction, allowing Tiberius to seize the city and depose Leontius; this did not prevent his troops from plundering the city. Tiberius had Leontius's nose slit, and sent him to live in the Monastery of Psamathion in Constantinople. According to the 12th-century chronicler Michael the Syrian, himself citing an unnamed contemporary 8th-century Syriac source, Tiberius justified his coup by pointing to Leontius' own dethroning of Emperor Justinian II (r. 685–695, 705–711) for mismanaging the empire as precedent. Before Tiberius, no naval officer had ever assumed the throne, partly because Byzantines considered the army far more prestigious.

=== Rule ===
Map of the Byzantine Empire in 717

Tiberius was crowned by Patriarch Callinicus I of Constantinople shortly after seizing control of Constantinople and deposing Leontius. Once in power, Tiberius did not attempt to retake Byzantine Africa from the Umayyads but rather focused his attention upon the eastern border of his empire. Tiberius appointed his brother, Heraclius, as patrikios (a prestigious courtly title) and monostrategos (head general) of the Anatolian themes (Byzantine administrative regions): the possessions of the Byzantine Empire located in Anatolia (modern-day Turkey). Heraclius invaded the Umayyad Caliphate in late autumn of 698, crossing the passes of the Taurus Mountains into Cilicia before marching for northern Syria. Heraclius defeated an Arab army sent from Antioch, then raided as far as Samosata before pulling back to the safety of Byzantine lands in spring of 699.

Heraclius' military successes led to a series of punitive Arab attacks: the Umayyad generals Muhammad ibn Marwan and Abdallah ibn Abd al-Malik conquered what little remained of the Byzantine's territory in Armenia in a string of campaigns to which Heraclius was unable to effectively respond. The Armenians launched a large revolt against the Umayyads in 702, requesting Byzantine aid. Then Abdallah launched a campaign to reconquer Armenia in 704 but was attacked by Heraclius in Cilicia. Heraclius defeated the Arab army of 10,000–12,000 men led by Yazid ibn Hunayn at Sisium, killing most and enslaving the rest; in spite of this, Heraclius was not able to stop Abdallah from reconquering Armenia.

Tiberius attempted to strengthen the Byzantine military by reorganizing its structure, as well as reorganizing the Cibyrrhaeotic Theme, and repairing the sea walls of Constantinople. Tiberius also focused his attention on the island of Cyprus, which had been underpopulated since many of the inhabitants were moved to the region of Cyzicus under his predecessor, Justinian II: Tiberius successfully negotiated with Abdallah in 698/699 to allow the Cypriots who had been moved to Cyzicus, and those who had been captured by the Arabs and taken to Syria, to return to their homelands. He also strengthened the garrison of the island with Mardaite troops from the Taurus Mountains. According to the historian Warren Treadgold, Tiberius attempted to contain the Arabs at sea by creating new military provinces, creating the Theme of Sardinia and separating the Theme of Sicily from the Exarchate of Ravenna. Tiberius also banished the future emperor Philippicus, the son of a patrikios, to the island of Cephalonia.

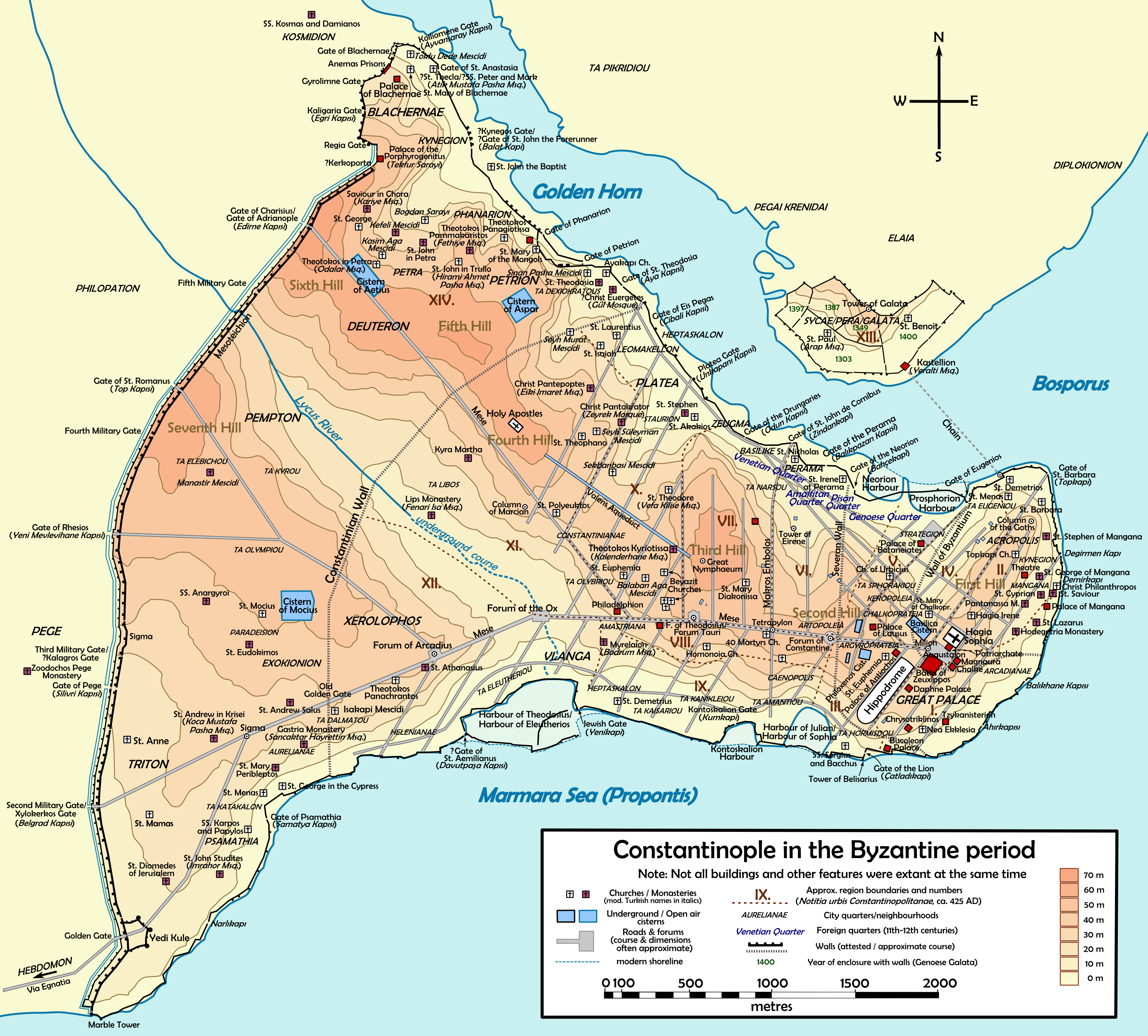
A map of Constantinople in Byzantine times; the Palace of Blachernae is located in the north-west of the city

In 702, Justinian II escaped from the Theme of Cherson (modern Crimea) and gained the support of Khagan Busir (r. 688/690–730), leader of the Khazars, who gave Justinian his sister Theodora as a bride, and welcomed him to his court in Phanagoria. By 703, reports that Justinian was attempting to gain support to retake the throne reached Tiberius, who swiftly sent envoys to the Khazars demanding that Justinian be handed over to the Byzantines, dead or alive. Justinian eluded capture, and sought the support of the khan of the First Bulgarian Empire, Tervel (r. 700–721). In 705, Justinian led an army of Slavs and Bulgars to Constantinople and laid siege to it for three days before scouts discovered an old and disused conduit that ran under the walls of the city. Justinian and a small detachment of soldiers used this route to gain access to the city, exited at the northern edge of the wall near the Palace of Blachernae, and quickly seized the building. Tiberius fled to the city of Sozopolis in Bithynia, and eluded his pursuers for several months before being captured. The exact timing of Justinian's siege and Tiberius' capture is convoluted. According to the numismatist Philip Grierson, Justinian II entered the city on 21 August, but according to the Byzantinist Constance Head, Justinian seized the city on 10 July, and the 21 August date is instead the date when Tiberius was captured in Sozopolis, or else the date when he was transported back to Constantinople. Six months later, probably on 15 February, Justinian had both Leontius and Tiberius dragged to the Hippodrome and publicly humiliated, before being taken away to the Kynegion (a city quarter near the Kynegos Gate) and beheaded. Their bodies were thrown into the sea, but were later recovered and buried in a church on the island of Prote.

==== Legacy ====
Head comments that although little is known of Tiberius, the evidence points to him being a "conscientious and effective ruler", and states that he might be remembered as "one of the truly great emperors of Byzantium" if he had reigned longer. Kaegi states that succeeding dynasties of the Byzantine Empire, and their associated historians, tend to blame the permanent loss of Byzantine Africa upon Tiberius, although he posits that, by the time Tiberius took the throne, it was far too late for the Byzantines to restore their control.

=== Family ===
Tiberius had a son, Theodosius, who became bishop of Ephesus by 729, presided over the Council of Hieria in 754, and advised Emperors Leo III (r. 717–741) and Constantine V (r. 741–775). The Byzantinist Graham Sumner has suggested that this son of Tiberius may have later become Emperor Theodosius III (r. 715–717). Sumner presents evidence that both figures held the Bishopric of Ephesus at similar times: Emperor Theodosius became bishop after 716, according to the Chronicon Altinate, and Theodosius the son of Tiberius became bishop by 729, suggesting they may be the same person. The Byzantinists Cyril Mango and Roger Scott do not view this theory as likely, as it would mean that Emperor Theodosius had to have lived for thirty more years after his abdication. Other details of Tiberius's family, including the name of his spouses, are lost: a common consequence of the upheaval of the period in which Tiberius ruled, known as the Twenty Years' Anarchy.

Tiberius III Born: 7th century Died: 15 February 706
Regnal titles
Preceded by Leontius	Byzantine Emperor; 698–705	Succeeded by Justinian II
Political offices
Vacant Title lapsed in 686 Title last held by Justinian II	Roman consul 699	Vacant Title lapsed until 711 Title next held by Philippicus
