= Battle of Anchialus (708) =

708 battle

- Part of the Byzantine–Bulgarian wars
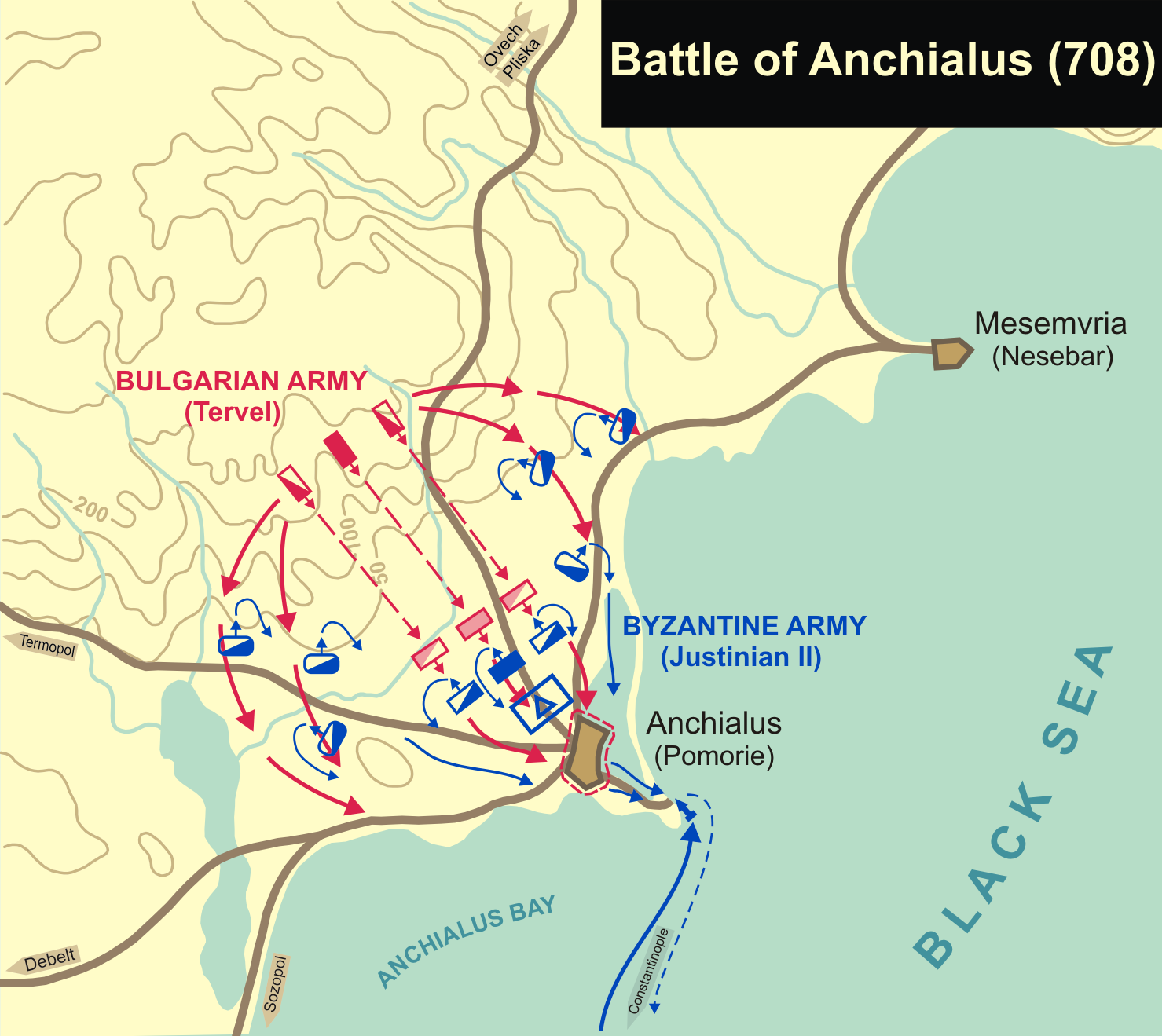
Date	708
Location	Pomorie, Bulgaria 42°33′N 27°39′E
Result	Bulgarian victory

Belligerents
Bulgarian Empire	Byzantine Empire

Commanders and leaders
Tervel	Justinian II

Strength
Unknown	Unknown

Casualties and losses
Unknown	Heavy

The Battle of Anchialus (Bulgarian: Битката при Анхиало) (Medieval Greek: Μάχη του Αγχίαλου) occurred in 708 near the modern-day town of Pomorie, Bulgaria

== Origins of the conflict ==
In 705, the Bulgarian Khan, Tervel helped the ex-emperor of Byzantium, Justinian II, regain his throne after 10 years in exile. To show his gratitude, Justinian gave the Bulgarians an enormous quantity of gold, silver, and silk, as well as the "Zagore" area, located between Stara Zagora, Sliven, and the Black Sea. Three years later, Justinian II considered himself strong enough to invade Bulgaria and restore his rule over these lands.

== Battle ==
The Byzantines reached the Anchialus fortress and set their camp there, unaware of the fact that the Bulgarian army was in the vicinity. While the invaders were gathering food, Tervel and his cavalry charged the outermost Byzantine troops, while at the same time the infantry attacked the camp.

The Byzantines were surprised and confused; most of them perished in the battle or were captured, as well as many horses and arms. The emperor was one of the very few who managed to reach the fortress and escape to Constantinople on a ship.

== Aftermath ==
The Bulgarians secured the new territorial gains for centuries. In 711 when a riot and coup attempt forced Justinian II to seek for help, Tervel gave him 3,000 soldiers, who after several skirmishes were given safe conduct to Bulgaria by the new emperor, who had Justinian II executed.
