= Zagore (region) =

Historical region in Bulgaria

Coordinates: 42°25′N 25°52′E

Zagore (Bulgarian: Загоре [zɐˈɡɔrɛ]), also Zagorie (Загорие), Zagora (Загора), or Zagoriya (Загория), was a vaguely defined medieval region in what is now Bulgaria. Its name is of Slavic origin and means "beyond [i.e. south of] the [Balkan] mountains". The region was first mentioned as Ζαγόρια (Zagoria) in Greek (in an Old Bulgarian translation it was rendered as Загорїа) when it was ceded to the First Bulgarian Empire by the Byzantine Empire during the rule of Tervel of Bulgaria in the very beginning of the 8th century (Byzantine–Bulgarian Treaty of 716). From the context, Zagore can be defined as a region in northeastern Thrace.

During the Second Bulgarian Empire, the region was also mentioned in Tsar Ivan Asen II of Bulgaria's post-1230 Dubrovnik Charter, which allowed Ragusan merchants to trade in the Bulgarian lands, among which "the whole Zagore" (пѡ всемѹ Загѡриѹ).

A 14th-century Venetian documents refer to Zagora as a synonym for Bulgaria (e.g. partes del Zagora, subditas Dobrotice in a document from 14 February 1384). Similarly, later Ragusan sources regularly evidence the active import of high-quality Zagoran wax (cera zagora, variously spelled zachori, zaura, zachorj, zacora) from Bulgaria, often bought in Sofia.

Today, the name of the region lives on in the toponyms Stara Zagora ("Old Zagora", a major city in northeastern Thrace, the capital of Stara Zagora Province) and Nova Zagora ("New Zagora", a city in Sliven Province). Zagore Beach on Livingston Island of the South Shetland Islands in Antarctica was also named after the region by the Antarctic Place-names Commission of Bulgaria.
