= Leontius =

Byzantine emperor from 695 to 698

- Emperor of the Romans
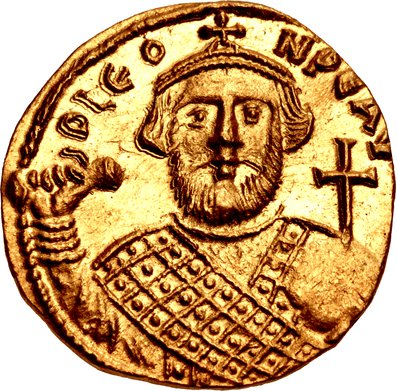
- Leontius in imperial regalia, as depicted on a solidus coin. Legend: dn leon pe av.

Byzantine emperor
- Reign: 695–698
- Predecessor: Justinian II
- Successor: Tiberius III
- Born: Leontius; Isauria
- Died: c. 15 February 706; Kynegion, Constantinople
- Issue: Tarasius (?)
Regnal name
- Leo
- Period: Twenty Years' Anarchy
- Father: Lazarus (?)

Leontius (Note: Leontius is sometimes enumerated as Leontius II, after the 5th-century usurper of the same name. Though the 5th-century Leontius was crowned by Verina, the empress of a preceding emperor, and minted coins of his own, he never successfully took the capital and is thus not normally counted or enumerated.) (Greek: Λεόντιος, romanized: Leóntios; died c. 15 February 706) was Byzantine emperor under the regnal name Leo from 695 to 698. Little is known of his early life, other than that he was born in Isauria in Asia Minor. He was given the title of patrikios, and made strategos of the Anatolic Theme under Emperor Constantine IV. He led forces against the Umayyads during the early years of Justinian II's reign, securing victory and forcing the Umayyad caliph, Abd al-Malik ibn Marwan, to sue for peace.

In 692, Justinian declared war upon the Umayyads again, and sent Leontius to campaign against them. However, he was defeated decisively at the Battle of Sebastopolis, and imprisoned by Justinian for his failure. He was released in 695, and given the title of strategos of the Theme of Hellas in Southern Greece. After being released, he led a rebellion against Justinian, and seized power, becoming emperor in the same year.

He ruled until 698, when he was overthrown by Apsimarus, a droungarios who had taken part in a failed expedition that had been launched by Leontius to recover Carthage. After seizing Constantinople, Apsimar took the name Tiberius (III), (Note: While many Byzantine emperors did adopt regnal names, none of them used regnal numbers, which are a purely historiographical intervention.) and had Leontius' nose and tongue cut off. He was sent to the Monastery of Dalmatou, where he remained until some time between August 705 and February 706. By this time Justinian had retaken the throne. Both Leontius and Tiberius were executed.

== Origin and early life ==
Little of Leontius' early life is known, other than that he was from Isauria, and possibly of Armenian descent. (Note: It is unclear whether the statement in Chronicle of 1234 that he was proclaimed emperor in Armenia indicates his Armenian origin or his campaigns there.) Christian Settipani speculates that Leontius was the son of a certain Lazarus, who was the direct descendant of emperor Phocas and general Priscus. Furthermore, Settipani identifies patrikios Tarasius as Leontius' son. Leontius was appointed as strategos of the Anatolic Theme, at the time the most senior military command of the Byzantine Empire, and patrikios by Emperor Constantine IV, possibly c. 682 AD.

Starting in 680, the Islamic Umayyad Caliphate erupted into a civil war, known as the Second Fitna. Umayyad authority was challenged even in their metropolitan province of Syria, while most of the Caliphate recognized Abdallah ibn al-Zubayr instead. Under Marwan I and his son Abd al-Malik, however, the Umayyads gained the upper hand, although the Zubayrids were not finally defeated until 692.

The civil war in the Umayyad Caliphate provided an opportunity for the Byzantine Empire to attack its weakened rival, and, in 686, Emperor Justinian II sent Leontius to invade Umayyad territory in Armenia and Iberia, where he campaigned successfully, before leading troops into Media and Caucasian Albania; during these campaigns he gathered loot. Leontius' successful campaigns compelled the Umayyad Caliph, Abd al-Malik ibn Marwan, to sue for peace in 688, agreeing to tender part of the taxes from Umayyad territory in Armenia, Iberia, and Cyprus, and to renew a treaty signed originally under Constantine IV, providing for a weekly tribute of 1,000 pieces of gold, one horse, and one slave.

Justinian invaded the Caliphate again in 692, feeling that the Umayyads were in a weak position, but was repulsed at the Battle of Sebastopolis, where a large number of Slavs defected to the Umayyads, ensuring the Byzantine defeat. After this, the Umayyads renewed their invasion of North Africa, aimed at taking the city of Carthage in the Exarchate of Africa, and also invaded Anatolia. Around this time, Justinian imprisoned Leontius. Some Byzantine sources, such as Nikephoros and Theophanes, suggest that Justinian did so because he believed that Leontius was seeking to take the throne, but it is possible that the crushing defeat at Sebastopolis played a part in his imprisonment; as strategos of the Anatolic Theme, he likely served in the battle, and may have even been the main Byzantine commander in it.

After further setbacks in the war, Justinian released Leontius in 695 because he feared losing control of Carthage, and appointed him strategos of the Theme of Hellas in Southern Greece. During his captivity, Leontius was cared for by two monks, Gregorios and Paulos, who prophesied his rise to the throne, and encouraged him to rise against Justinian after his release. Leontius, once free, quickly raised a rebellion against Justinian. Leontius had wide support from the aristocracy, who opposed Justinian's land policies, which restricted the aristocracy's ability to acquire land from peasant freeholders, and the peasantry, who opposed Justinian's tax policies, as well as the Blue faction, and the Patriarch of Constantinople Callinicus. Leontius and his supporters seized Justinian and brought him to the Hippodrome, where Justinian's nose was cut off, a common practice in Byzantine culture, done in order to remove threats to the throne, as mutilated people were traditionally barred from becoming emperor; however, Leontius did not kill Justinian, out of reverence for Constantine IV. After Justinian's nose was cut off, Leontius exiled him to Cherson, a Byzantine exclave in the Crimea.

== Reign and downfall ==
Upon his coronation, Leontius, now known as "Leo", adopted a moderate political stance. He restricted the activity of the Byzantine army, allowing small raids against the border of the Byzantine empire to proceed without reprisal, and instead focused upon consolidation. Very little is known of his domestic policy, except that he had the port of Neorion in Constantinople cleared, which allegedly led to a four-month outbreak of plague.

The Umayyads, emboldened by Leontius' perceived weakness, invaded the Exarchate of Africa in 696, capturing Carthage in 697. Leontius sent the patrikios and general John to retake the city. John was able to seize Carthage after a surprise attack on its harbor. However, Umayyad reinforcements soon retook the city, forcing John to retreat to Crete and regroup. A group of officers, fearing the Emperor's punishment for their failure, revolted and proclaimed Apsimar, a droungarios (mid-level commander) of the Cibyrrhaeots, emperor.

Apsimar took the regnal name Tiberius, gathered a fleet and allied himself with the Green faction, before sailing for Constantinople, which was enduring the bubonic plague. After several months of siege, the city surrendered to Tiberius, in 698. Tiberius captured Leontius, and had his nose slit before imprisoning him in the Monastery of Dalmatou. Leontius stayed in the monastery under guard until Justinian retook the throne with the assistance of the Bulgar king Tervel in 705. Justinian then had both Leontius and Tiberius dragged to the Hippodrome and publicly humiliated, before being taken away and beheaded. The execution took place on 15 February 706 according to the 13th-century Chronicon Altinate. (Note: The Prosopography of the Byzantine World gives 15 February as the end of Leontius' reign, but the chronicle clearly indicates that it was the date of both Tiberius and Leontius' execution.) The body of Leontius was thrown into the sea alongside Tiberius, but was later recovered and buried in a church on the island of Prote.

== See also ==
- List of Byzantine emperors

== Notes ==
Leontius Born: Unknown Died: February 706
Regnal titles
Preceded by Justinian II	Byzantine Emperor; 695–698	Succeeded by Tiberius III
