= Phoenix (Caria) =

Town of ancient Caria

Coordinates: 36°36′43″N 28°05′14″E

Phoenix or Phoinix (Ancient Greek: Φοῖνιξ) was a town of ancient Caria, near the mountain of the same name on the southern branch of the Bozburun Peninsula. It may be the same as the town called Phoenice or Phoinike (Φοινίκη) by Stephanus of Byzantium.

It belonged to the Rhodian Peraea.

Its site is located near Fenaket in Asiatic Turkey. Archaeology has uncovered numerous inscriptions.
