= Philippicus =

Byzantine emperor from 711 to 713

- Emperor of the Romans
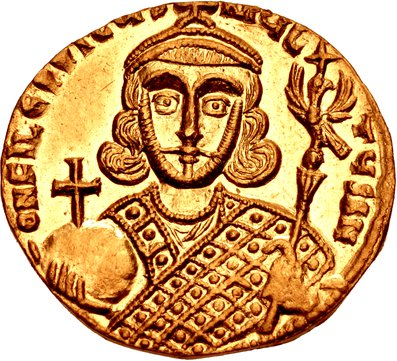
- A solidus of Philippicus

Byzantine emperor
- Reign: 4 November 711 – 3 June 713
- Predecessor: Justinian II
- Successor: Anastasius II
- Born: Bardanes (Note: His first name is sometimes spelled as Bardanus or Vardanus in outdated sources.); Pergamum, Thracesian Theme (now Bergama, Izmir, Turkey)
- Died: 713
Regnal name
- Imperator Caesar Filepicus Augustus
- Father: Nicephorus
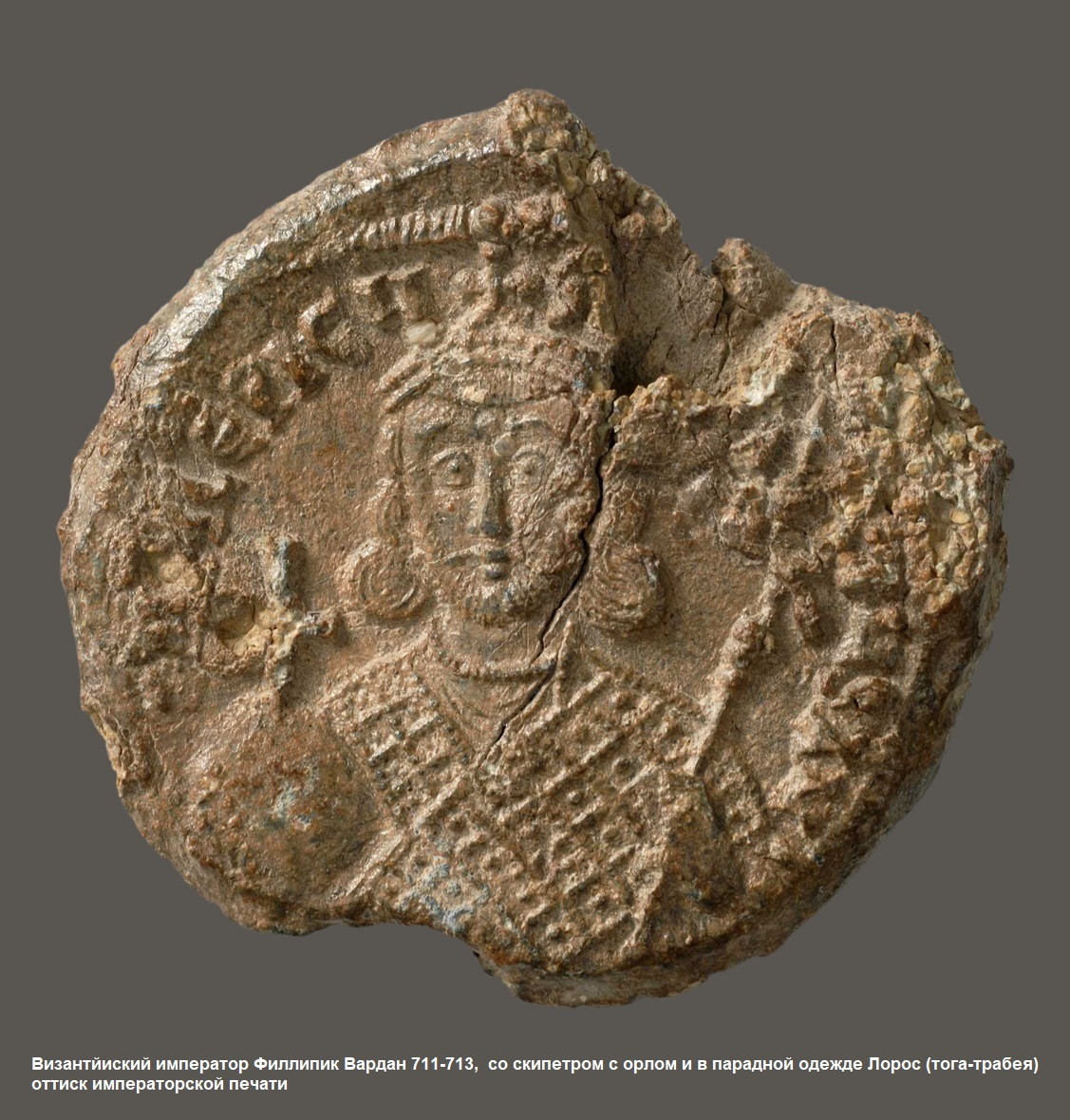
- Seal

Philippicus (Latin: Filepicus; (Note: Contemporary coins render his name in Latin as Filepicus. Philippicus is a modernized version following the Greek rendition of the name.) Greek: Φιλιππικός, romanized: Philippikós), born Bardanes (Greek: Βαρδάνης, romanized: Bardánēs; Armenian: Վարդան, Vardan), was Byzantine emperor from 711 to 713. He took power in a coup against the unpopular emperor Justinian II, whose second regnal period (705-711) was a rule of terror. Philippicus' reign was short-lived, and his two policies implemented upon accession to the throne did not win him popular support. His deposition was the result of a plot that was conceived by the count of the Opsician army, George Buraphus, who sent a band of soldiers to abduct and blind the emperor. During his brief reign, Philippicus supported monothelitism in Byzantine theological disputes, and saw conflict with the First Bulgarian Empire and the Umayyad Caliphate.

== Familial background, early life. ==
Philippicus was originally named Bardanes; he was the son of a patrician Nicephorus, who was of Armenian extraction from an Armenian colony in Pergamum. The Armenian background of Philippicus was supported by earlier scholarship on the matter, most notably the Byzantinists, Peter Charanis and Nicholas Adontz, but it has been disputed by recent scholars, such as Anthony Kaldellis. Regardless of the hotly debated subject of ethnicity among the scholarly community or the critique that Kaldellis' views have elicited, one may profit from the ongoing discourse by advancing their ability to interpret the source material and at the same time by acknowledging their limitations avoids over-interpretation.

Now, let us return to the conspectus of the life of Bardanes, wherein it is widely accepted that he was born and bred to a Constantinopolitan noble family. His father Nicephorus held the rank of patrician serving as strategos who led the imperial forces either against the Arabs in an expedition in Africa in 665-666 or against Saborios, the rebellious strategos of the Armenian troops in 668. Contemporaneous sources attest to Bardanes's tutoring, scholarly interests, learning and eloquence, all of which were in Greek. Bardanes' baptismal name and the characterisation of his father Nicephorus, as 'Persarmenian' are both suggestive of the family's provenience, making, thus, highly likely the putative affiliation with the Armenian prince Vardan Mamikonian who is known to have sought refuge to Byzantium in 575 after the assassination of the Persian marzpan, governor of Armenia. The latter after establishing himself in Byzantium was related indirectly to the family of the emperor Maurice, whose sister Gordia was married to a certain Philippicus, who was then raised to the highest of offices, namely comes excubitorum and magister militum per Orientem. It was that familial relationship with the emperor Maurice that accorded to the name Philippicus imperial legitimation and led to its adoption from Bardanes upon proclaim from the imperial troops.

=== Rise to power ===
Probably the most peculiar to lifetime of Bardanes was not that he was the offspring of a family of military aristocracy of service, which he served, but rather that he was exiled twice before becoming an emperor. The first time was to Cephalonia in ca. 702/3 when the emperor Tiberius III Apsimar learnt of the premonitory dream of Bardanes wherein an eagle shaded his head. The second one was in the second regnal period of Justinian II (705-711), who although he recalled in the first place him, it appears that he had to exile him yet again for reason that are unclear but apparently relate to the man's imperial ambitions. According to the sources Justinian II had instructed a newly appointed governor Helias and the commander of a naval expedition to Cherson to keep Bardanes in the Black Sea port in internal exile. However, the latter managed to flee to the Khazars who supported his bid to the imperial throne. Justinian II's vengeance for that and his own treatment when exiled there led him to send to the Chersonites large naval forces under the leadership of Maurus. The leaders of Cherson to counter the situation found Bardanes recalled him and proclaimed him emperor, a situation which enticed also Maurus' forces and after brief skirmishes, joined the revolt. Philippicus embarked on the imperial fleet and set sail to Constantinople. The usurper was welcomed to the city and found little opposition, as Justinian II had marched to the Black Sea. When the imperial forces deserted Justinian II, the spatharios Helias beheaded the deposed emperor and the same fate found his young son Tiberius alongside supporters of the Heraclian dynasty.

=== Reign ===
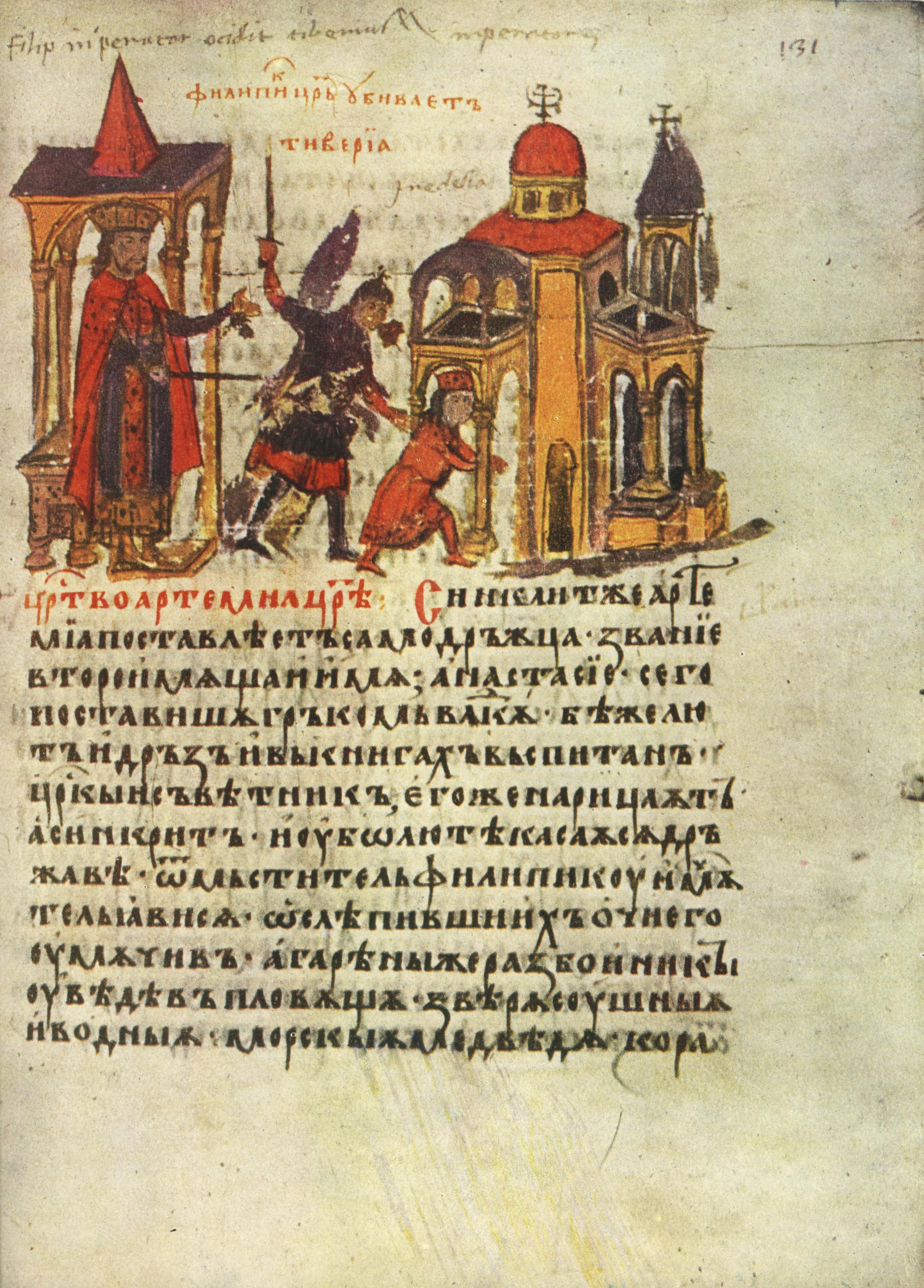
Philippicus (left) apprehending Tiberius (son of Justinian II) for execution. Scene from the 12th century Manasses Chronicle

Philippicus managed to implement in his brief reign only two emergency policies, to revert to Monothelitism and to enforce that doctrine to all Armenian populations living on imperial soil. Inadvertently, the latter led to mass departure of Armenians back to their homeland. Yet, this policy with the subsequent demographic increase in Armenia the emperor thought that would win him back the Monophysite Armenians and his Caucasian diplomacy sought to approach the Armenian princes by capitalising on his own provenience, as a further factor that would have made an alliance with the Byzantine empire a positive development. Be that as it may, this policy strand is no different from the agenda that Heraclius introduced late in his reign, regardless if it was successful or not.

Among the first acts of Philippicus were the deposition of Cyrus (the orthodox patriarch of Constantinople) in favour of John VI (a member of his own sect), and the summoning of a conciliabulum of Eastern bishops, which abolished the canons of the Sixth Ecumenical Council. In response, the Roman Church refused to recognize the new emperor and his patriarch. Meanwhile, the Bulgarian ruler Tervel plundered up to the walls of Constantinople in 712. When Philippicus transferred an army from the Opsikion theme to police the Balkans, the Umayyad Caliphate under Al-Walid I made inroads across the weakened defenses of Asia Minor.

In late May 713 the Opsikion troops rebelled in Thrace. Several of their officers penetrated the city and blinded Philippicus on June 3, 713 while he was in the hippodrome. He was succeeded for a short while by his principal secretary, Artemius, who was raised to the purple as Emperor Anastasius II. He died in the same year.

== See also ==
- List of Byzantine emperors

== Notes ==
Regnal titles
Preceded by Justinian II	Byzantine Emperor; 4 November 711 – 3 June 713	Succeeded by Anastasius II
Political offices
Preceded by Tiberius III in 699, then lapsed	Roman consul 711	Succeeded by Lapsed, Anastasius II in 714
