= Khazar Protectorate over Cherson =

Part of 8th century in Byzantine Chersonesus

Khazar protectorate was an episode in the history of Byzantine Chersonesus (then Cherson). During the early 8th century, the city was part of the Khazar Khaganate for several years. The protectorate was established at the request of the citizens and local authorities. They feared repressions after a palace coup occurred in Constantinople in 705. This coup returned Emperor Justinian II to power who was very hostile to the inhabitants of Crimea.

A tudun appointed by the Khazar khagan appeared in the city, but local self-government was preserved. Sources do not specify exactly when and how this happened. It is only known that the military forces deployed by the Khazars were small. The relations between Byzantium and Khazaria initially remained peaceful. In 710 and 711, Justinian sent three punitive expeditions against Cherson. The first expedition returned control of the city to the emperor and captured the Khazar official. The other two expeditions, according to Byzantine chroniclers, were sent to completely destroy Cherson, Bosporus, and the rest of the Crimean cities. The inhabitants learned of the impending danger and also asked the Khazars for protection. Military actions stopped when the Khazar army approached. After this, the Khazars intervened in Byzantine politics and played a decisive role in establishing a new emperor.

== Background ==
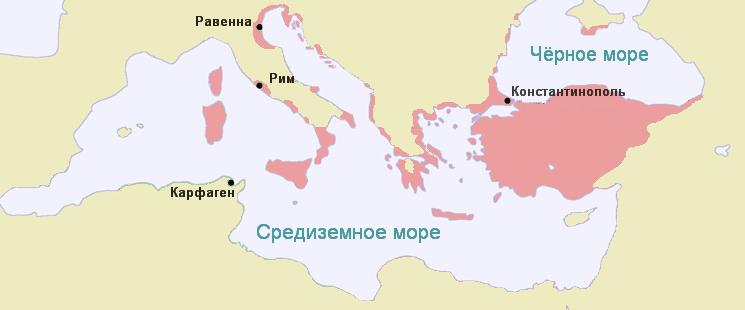
Byzantine Empire by 717. Top right is the territory of Cherson, Sugdaea, and the climates of Gothia.

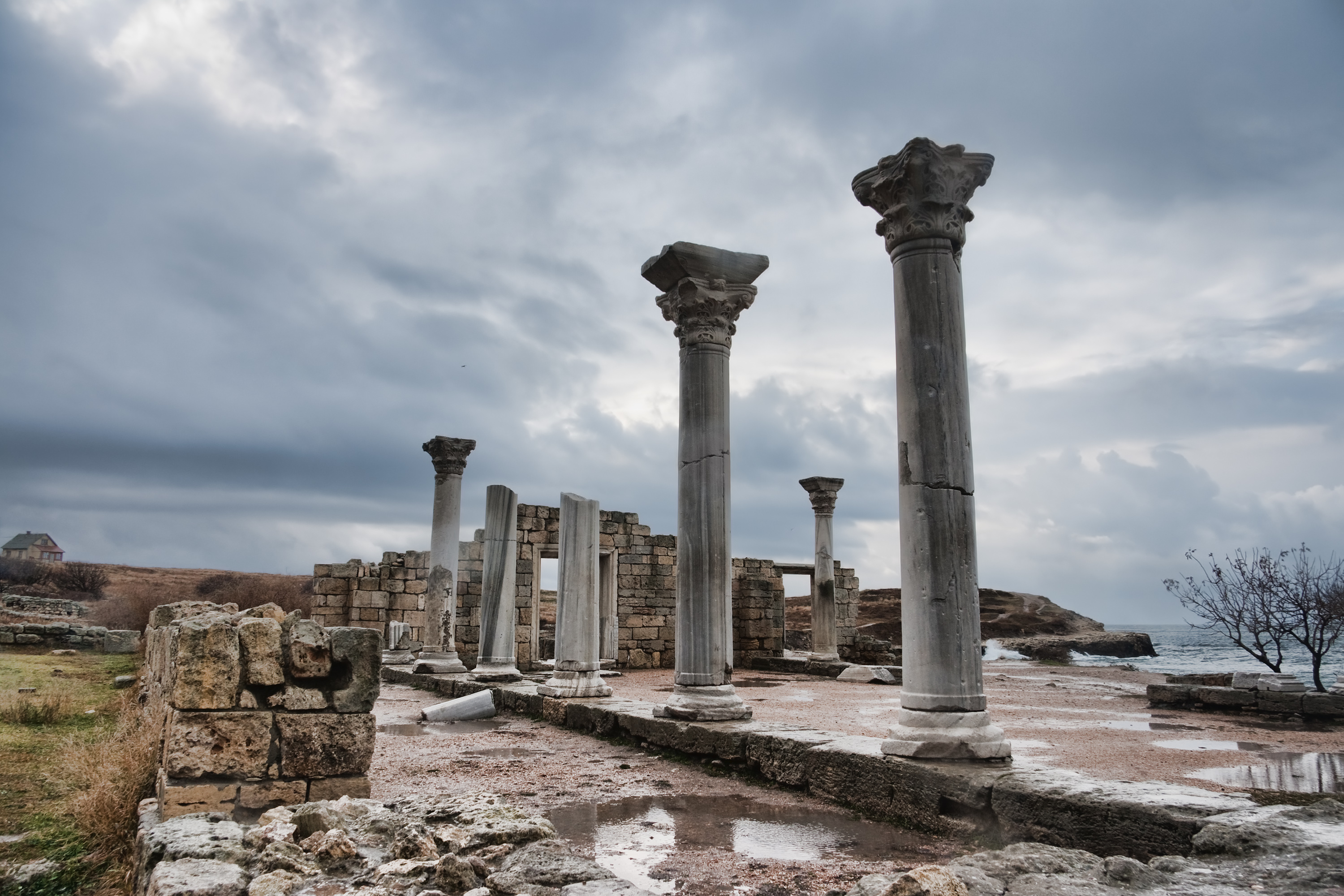
"1935 Basilica" in Chersonesus.

At the beginning of the Middle Ages, Cherson (as Chersonesus was called since the 4th century AD) was a distant provincial city of the Byzantine Empire. It lost a large part of its former ancient prosperity. However, it continued to be a major urban center and the main Byzantine outpost in Crimea. Strong fortress walls and a favorable coastal location saved it from barbarian invasions. During the entire Migration Period, various tribes invaded Crimea. These included Goths, Huns, Turkuts, Onogurs, Khazars, and later Hungarians and Pechenegs. Cherson was never conquered. Sometimes, however, its inhabitants felt more like prisoners than citizens, as one source stated. Periods of sharp conflict were the exception. Normally, relations between Chersonites and the barbarian periphery were peaceful. The nomads neighboring the city always needed local craft products and Byzantine luxury goods, while the city residents needed agricultural goods. Other areas with a Christianized Byzantine population existed in Southwestern Crimea and the Kerch Peninsula. These included the port cities of Bosporus and Sugdaea, and the archontates or climates of Gothia in the mountains. They had political and church ties with both Cherson and the imperial administration. However, the direct power of the barbarians was always felt much stronger here, and the proportion of the incoming population was much larger.

The Byzantine Empire first came into close contact with the Khazars during its war against Sasanian Iran in 626–630 AD. The Khazars then provided the Byzantines with valuable military assistance. Together, they defeated Iran and conquered Transcaucasia. In the middle of the 7th century, the Khazar Khaganate finally separated from the Western Turkic Khaganate and became an independent state. The Khazar-Byzantine rapprochement became even more urgent. Instead of Iran, their new common enemy was the newly emerged Arab Caliphate (centered in Syria with its capital in Damascus from 661). The Khazars did not share borders with Byzantine possessions until the 660s. Then they defeated the Bulgars and established themselves in the steppes of the Sea of Azov and the Northern Black Sea region. This opened the way for their expansion into Crimea. These events are the earliest reliable reports in written sources about the presence of Khazars on the peninsula.

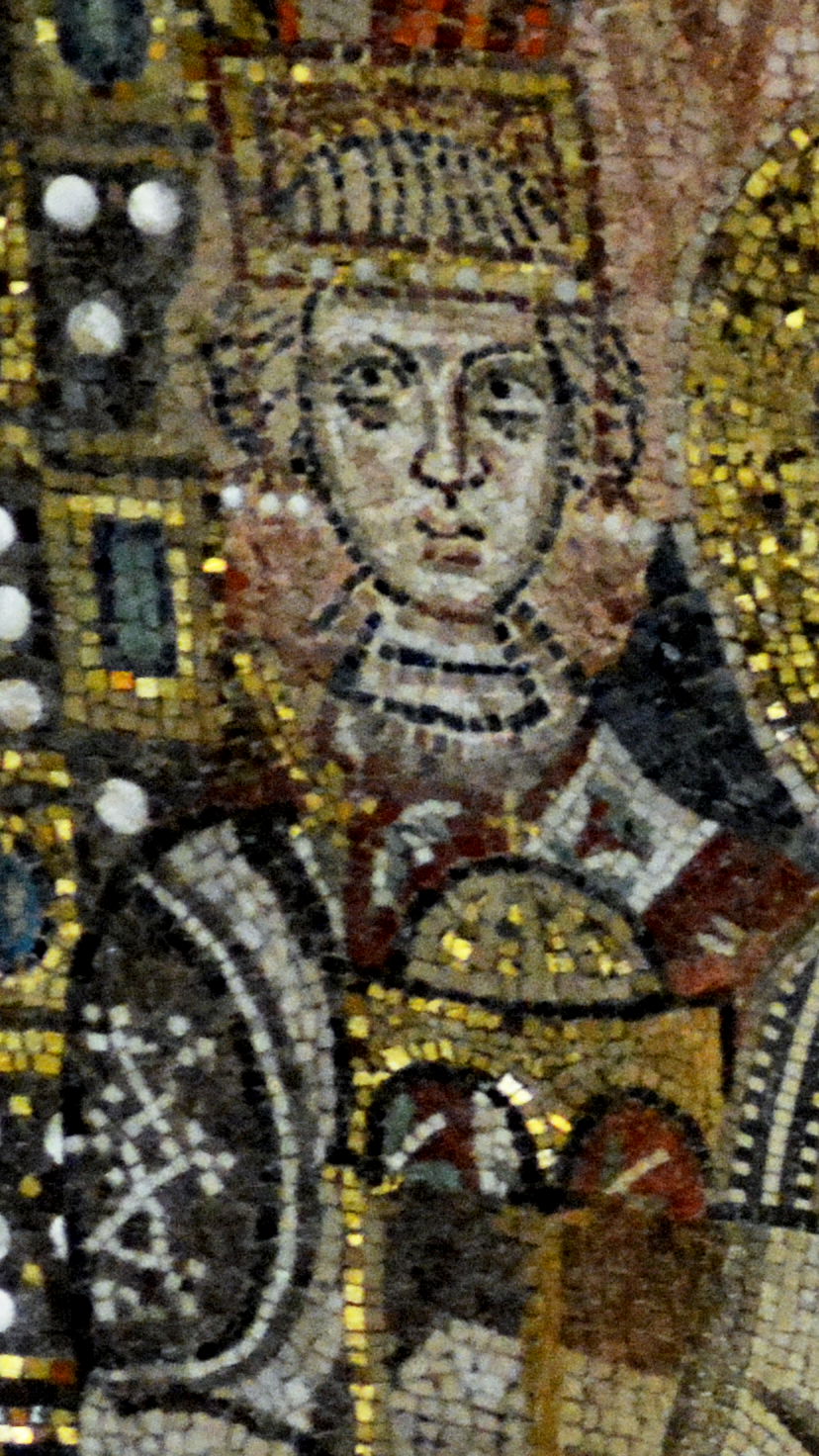
Young Justinian II, mosaic in the Basilica of Sant'Apollinare in Classe, Ravenna.

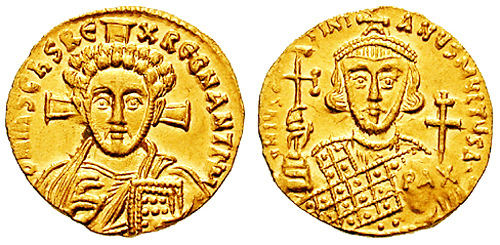
Solidus of Emperor Justinian II.

In 695, Emperor Justinian II was overthrown in Byzantium after ruling for 10 years. He came to power at the age of 16. He proved to be energetic but extremely domineering, quick-tempered, cruel, and ruthless to real and imaginary enemies. The population was extremely irritated by the new taxes he introduced that were levied not only on ordinary residents but also on the nobility. The unlawful methods used to collect these taxes also caused anger.

Justinian meanwhile tried to build palaces and built the so-called Justinian dining room and walls around the palace. <...> Under him, he appointed as general accountant a certain abbot Theodotus, who had previously lived in seclusion in the Thracian straits. This mischievous and too cruel man, demanding reports, taxes and exactions, hung on ropes and smoked with straw many state rulers, famous people, not only officials, but also private city residents, and all this without guilt, in vain, and without any pretext. In addition, the mayor, by royal command, imprisoned very many people and forced them to languish there for years. All this increased the people's hatred for the king.

The reason for the uprising was a rumor. It said that Justinian was going to organize a night massacre of the people in Constantinople and punish the patriarch. (Note: Justinian had a conflict with Patriarch Callinicus I before this. The emperor wanted to improve the city and decided to build a fountain and a tribune on the site of the Metropolitan Church. He demanded that the patriarch bless this decision with a prayer. The patriarch replied that he only knew prayers for the foundation of a temple, not for its destruction. But the emperor still forced him to say a prayer. The church was demolished and built in another place.) The coup was led by the military commander Leontios. Justinian had imprisoned Leontios for three years because of the lost Battle of Sebastopolis.

Having entered, he opened the dungeons, freed many imprisoned noble people, who had languished in chains for six to eight years, mostly soldiers, and having armed them went out into the square, exclaiming: all Christians to Hagia Sophia; and having sent to all parts of the city, he ordered the same words to be exclaimed.

Leontios arrested Justinian with the support of the patriarch. The next morning, he brought the overthrown emperor to the hippodrome in front of the crowd and, despite calls for reprisals, generously spared him. Still, Justinian's tongue and nose were cut off. Because of this, he received the nickname Rhinotmetos, meaning noseless. He was then sent into exile to Cherson.

Leontios was a protégé of the city aristocracy. He did not stay on the imperial throne for long, and his short reign was filled with a feverish struggle against external enemies. Two years later (697), the Arabs captured Byzantine Africa. They set up their own commanders from their own army there. A naval expedition was sent against the Arabs the next year. It initially acted successfully, but eventually had to retreat. Fearing punishment, the expedition mutinied. The troops marched on the capital and proclaimed the military commander Apsimar as the new emperor. Apsimar also cut off Leontios' nose and imprisoned him. Apsimar himself began to rule under the name Tiberios III.

== Plot against Justinian ==
The events began around 704. (Note: This is an approximate date accepted in literature. Justinian entered the capital in the fall of 705, and sources say it was "the next year" after his flight to the Bulgars. But exactly how much time Justinian spent in exile is not indicated in the sources. Researchers who prefer strict and cautious formulations prefer to speak of the moment "after 698".) Upon learning of the overthrow of Leontios, Justinian began to openly declare his intention to return to power. He frequently gave speeches to the people. The residents of Cherson did not like this perspective. They feared the anger of the imperial authorities. They reported what was happening to Constantinople and planned to either kill Justinian or send him bound to the capital. Justinian fled the city and hid in the mountain fortress of Doros (presumably modern Mangup) in Gothia. While there, he sought a meeting with the khagan of Khazaria, Busir Glavan. The meeting took place. The khagan received the ex-emperor with honor, became his friend, and gave him his sister in marriage. The Khazar name of the princess is unknown. At baptism, she was named Theodora in honor of the famous wife of the imperial namesake, Justinian I.

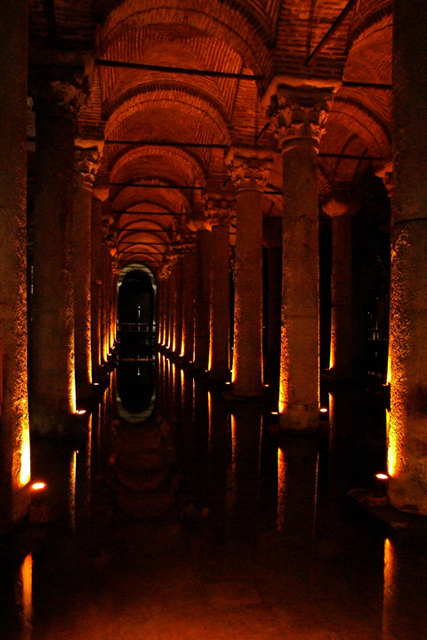
Basilica Cistern in Constantinople, modern view.

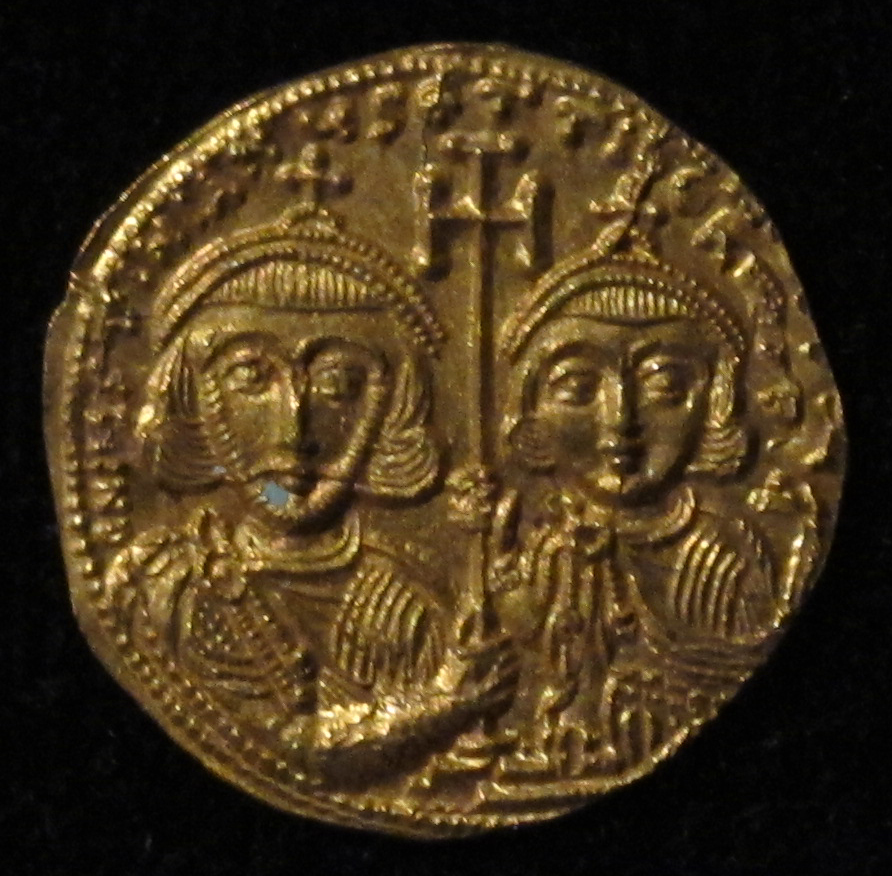
Solidus with portrait of Justinian II and his son Tiberius.

With the khagan's permission, Justinian crossed the Strait of Kerch and settled in Phanagoria. Two high-ranking officials were constantly with him here: the personal representative of the khagan Papatzys (possibly the governor of Phanagoria) and the ruler of Bosporus Balgitz. When Tiberios learned of the incident, he sent his own embassy to Busir Glavan or even a series of embassies. Promising a generous reward, he persuaded the khagan to hand over Justinian or, at the very least, just send his head. The khagan likely concluded that the request made sense. He sent a guard to Justinian under the pretext of protection from conspiracies, but in reality for an actual arrest. He ordered Papatzys and Balgitz to be ready to kill the ex-emperor at the first order. However, the conspiracy became known to Theodora through a servant of the khagan, and she told her husband everything. The true attitude of the khagan towards the emperor is not clear from the picture drawn by the sources. Theophanes the Confessor and Nikephoros I of Constantinople present the matter as if Justinian was really going to be killed. However, some further details in their story suggest that the relations between the two rulers remained friendly. From another source, it is known that the khagan visited Constantinople after Justinian's triumphal accession and received a generous tribute. It is possible, as Sergey Sorochan suggested, that the khagan only formally sought to fulfill the promise given to Tiberios, and having specially arranged the escape, waited for further development of events. Justinian was warned in time and took energetic measures for his salvation. He invited Papatzys for a private conversation and strangled him with a string. He then killed Balgitz in the same way. After that, he sent his wife back to her brother in Khazaria. This can be equally interpreted as a gesture of an insulted person and as a concern for her safety. He secretly fled from Phanagoria himself. On a fishing boat, he reached the harbor of Symbolon (Balaklava) near Cherson. There, he secretly contacted a small group of supporters he had in the city. Together with them, he sailed on a ship to the mouth of the Danube. From there, he turned for alliance and help to the ruler of the First Bulgarian Empire, Khan Tervel. He promised him many benefits and the hand of his daughter. Tervel readily responded to the proposal. At the head of his army, together with Justinian, he went to Constantinople. After standing under the city walls for three days, Justinian entered the city at night through an underground water pipe with a small detachment. Justinian executed both of his predecessors, Tiberios and Leontios. He dragged them around the hippodrome and trampled them. He generously rewarded the Bulgars, who had pitched their tents right at the Palace of Blachernae. Tervel was endowed with the title of caesar. This was the next title in importance after the imperial one. It became the first case in the history of Byzantium when a foreigner was awarded such a position. Justinian gave him imperial clothes, seated him next to himself on the throne, and ordered the people to pay the same honors as to himself. The second of the promises given to Tervel probably remained unfulfilled. Not a single source mentions his marriage to Justinian's daughter.

Having executed all his enemies, Justinian sent a large military fleet to Khazaria to return his wife. The fleet got caught in a storm on the way and partially sank. Justinian may have doubted that the khagan would give up his sister voluntarily. However, the khagan did not put up any obstacles and politely told the emperor:

Oh foolish one, were two or three ships not enough for you to take your wife and not destroy so many people? Or do you think that you will take her in battle? Know that a son was born to you, send for them and take them.

In 706, Theodora and her son, named Tiberius, were safely delivered to Constantinople. Justinian awarded them the titles of augustus and augusta and officially crowned them as his co-rulers. Probably then or somewhat later, the khagan himself visited the capital. His honoring took place in the golden-domed Basilica, behind the Milion (presumably, this is the Basilica Cistern). Statues of Justinian and Theodora were also erected there. Justinian was depicted kneeling.

== Arrival of the Khazars in Cherson ==
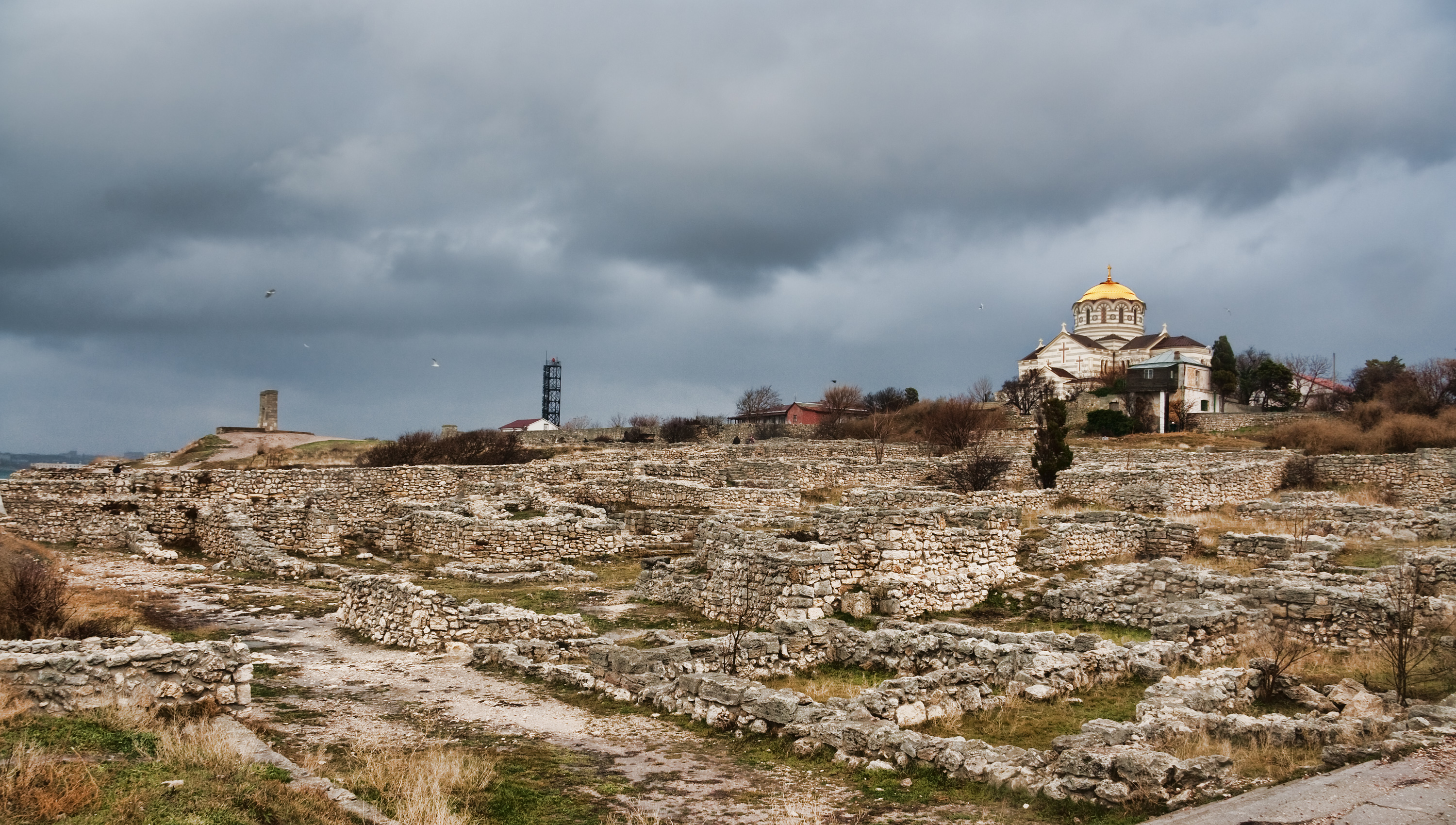
Ruins of Chersonesus, modern view.

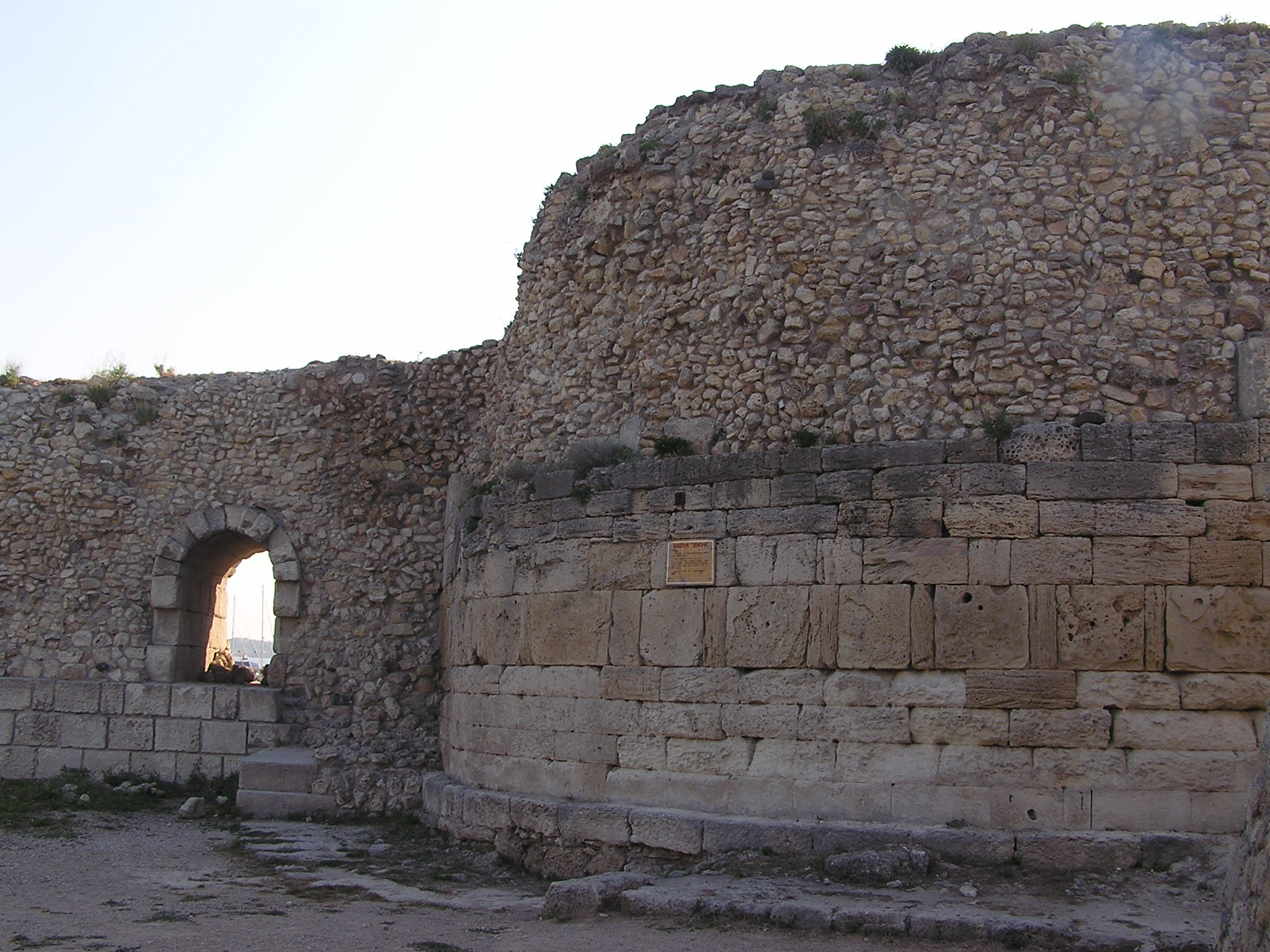
Zeno's Tower. View from the peribolos.

At some point between Justinian's flight and the arrival of the first Byzantine expedition in the city in 710 or 711, a Khazar administration appeared in Cherson. The sources do not provide any details regarding the time and specific circumstances. It is only clear that it was not yet there when Justinian lived in the city, otherwise he would not have had to specially seek contact with the Khazars. Nothing is reported about the presence of any Khazar army in the city. Theophanes and Nikephoros simply state that, along with the Proteuons (members of the city council from the most noble and wealthy citizens) and the Protopolites (the head of the city, elected from among the proteuons), the authorities included a tudun, who was there "on behalf of the khagan".

...And the Tudun — the archon of Cherson, who was there on behalf of the khagan, and Zoilus, the first citizen by birth and tribe, as well as forty other noble men, the proteuons of Cherson...

Both authors call him an "archon". This is a broad term that in Byzantine sources was used as standard for barbarian leaders of any rank, both sovereigns and governors, and simply for representatives of the nobility. In the Turkic Khaganates, "tuduns" were representatives of the khagan sent to subordinate multi-ethnic regions. Their functions included overseeing local rulers and collecting taxes. The title is believed to have been borrowed by the Turks from the Chinese word for "head of civil administration". The additional characteristic given by Theophanes perfectly corresponds to the meaning of the position, so many researchers believe it is a literal translation. Theophanes uses the exact same expression in relation to the Khazar representative in Phanagoria, who could also have been a tudun. Specifically for Khazaria, tuduns are attested by sources twice more. They are mentioned in the Khazar army during the stay of the Khazars in Caucasian Albania in 628. (Note: Primary source of information: The History of the Country of Albania by Movses Kaghankatvatsi.) They are also mentioned in an epigraphic inscription on a fragment of a stone slab from the Bakhchysarai Museum. This inscription comes from Mountainous Crimea and dates to the 8th–9th centuries. It reports the construction of a temple during the reign of a certain khagan and a tudun.

An important aspect not covered by the available sources is where the khagan's headquarters was located in Khazaria during this period. It is only clear that it was not in Crimea and not in Phanagoria. The later center of Khazaria (in the 9th–10th centuries) was located in the lower reaches of the Volga at Atil. Earlier, during the periods when the Khazars fought wars with the Arabs in Transcaucasia, Eastern sources suggest Dagestan as the area where their ruler was located. However, the period of the late 7th century and early 8th century is a gap in this regard. During this time, there is no news about the Khazars in Eastern sources. Because of this, some researchers hypothetically believe that the khagan's headquarters at this moment moved further from the Caucasus and closer to Crimea. (Note: The fundamental possibility of such a hypothesis is based on a report in one Byzantine source regarding the residence of Khagan Birkhor in the 740s–750s, which is named as Kerch.)

== First expedition of Justinian ==
Five years after his accession, Justinian remembered Cherson. As Paul the Deacon writes, Justinian "after having seized power again, often wiped away the flowing snot with his hand and almost as often ordered someone to be killed". Nikephoros writes:

Justinian, keeping in mind the denunciation of the Chersonites against him to Apsimar, gathered a multitude of various ships, put his men on them numbering up to one hundred thousand, trained from the stratiot catalogs, and in addition from peasants, artisans, from the council of the syncline and the demes of the city; at the head of this fleet he placed a certain patrician Stephen, nicknamed Asmikt [i.e., "ferocious"], and sent him with the order to put to the sword the entire people in Cherson, Bosphorus and other archonships, and to make his doryphoros Ilya, who is setting off with Stephen, the archon of Cherson, and also to leave there as an exile Bardanes, an Armenian by birth.

There is uncertainty regarding the date. Theophanes places the story of all three expeditions under the year 711/712 and notes that the first expedition ended in October. As in the previous case, only the date of the final event is firmly known — the death of Justinian on December 11, 711. Sailing between Constantinople and Cherson took 10–11 days one way, so it is possible that all the events could have developed very quickly and fit into one year. However, the variant recognized as more probable in literature is that the first expedition took place in the previous year, that is, in 710.

The Armenian Bardanes was one of the dignitaries who sought imperial power under Tiberios. For this, he was arrested and imprisoned on the island of Cephalonia. The sources do not say why Justinian decided to change his place of exile.

Theophanes and Nikephoros call reckless revenge the only motive that moved Justinian. It is quite possible that they exaggerated the size of the army and the scale of repressions. Modern historians note that the first campaign against Cherson was part of a general state policy consistently pursued by Justinian. This policy was aimed at replacing independent municipal authorities with officials sent from the center. The same expedition was simultaneously sent to Ravenna. However, chroniclers also explained it by motives of revenge. (Note: This is reported by Agnellus of Ravenna, who quotes the words spoken by the emperor: "This people are my enemies, for they treacherously cut off my nose and ears.") The local nobility there faced the same savage methods of reprisal. (Note: The expedition against Ravenna and the reaction of the local residents to it are described in Italian sources and coincide with the Cherson events up to many details. In the spring of 710, a Byzantine fleet sailed to the city, led by the strategos of Sicily, patrician Theodore. Noble townspeople were invited to a feast held in tents right on the shore. The next day, unsuspecting guests were invited two by two to board the ships. There they were grabbed, tied up, and thrown into the hold with a gag in their mouths. As soon as all the guests were seized, the ships weighed anchor and sailed to Constantinople. Meanwhile, a military detachment remained on the shore, attacked the city and organized a massacre in it. The shocked townspeople offered no resistance. Having plundered houses and church property, the expedition loaded onto the returned ships and sailed back to the capital. Almost all the captives in Constantinople were executed. Only the archbishop of Ravenna, Felix, was left alive. He was blinded and exiled somewhere to Pontus (possibly even to Cherson). The answer of the residents of Ravenna was an uprising. They elected a ruler (dux) George, the son of one of the captured nobles. In the city square, George gave a speech, urging to save the city from "the snake that sailed here by sea from Byzantium, whose poison we have all already tasted." Neighboring towns joined the rebels. All adult men were organized into militia and bandi. The authorities distributed weapons to the population, sent out detachments to guard neighboring fortresses and organized patrols of the coast. The Byzantine exarch of Ravenna, John III Rizocopus, was at that moment on business in Naples. When he arrived in Ravenna in October, he was killed by the rebels. After the overthrow of Justinian, Archbishop Felix was returned to the city, and all captured property was returned to the Church of Ravenna, adding generous gifts to it. After this, the uprising stopped, and the Ravennese agreed to accept a new exarch.)

The expedition occupied the city without resistance. The Khazar tudun, protopolites Zoilus, and 40 other proteuons were arrested with their families and sent in chains to Constantinople. Seven other proteuons were tied to wooden spits and burned. Twenty more prominent citizens from other Crimean cities were tied to a boat filled with stones and sunk in the sea. The Cherson officials sent to the capital were probably supposed to serve as hostages. Why the Khazar representative was sent there can only be guessed, but for Justinian himself this step subsequently became fatal.

According to chroniclers, Stephen Asmikt did not exactly execute the emperor's order: he killed only adult residents of Cherson, sparing children. When Justinian found out about this, he flew into a rage and sent Stephen an order to immediately return to Constantinople. This was despite the fact that it was already early October, a dangerous time for navigation. On the way back, the fleet got caught in a storm that scattered the bodies of its passengers from Amastris to Heraclea Pontica. Seventy-three thousand out of the 100,000 sent people died.

== Second expedition of Justinian ==
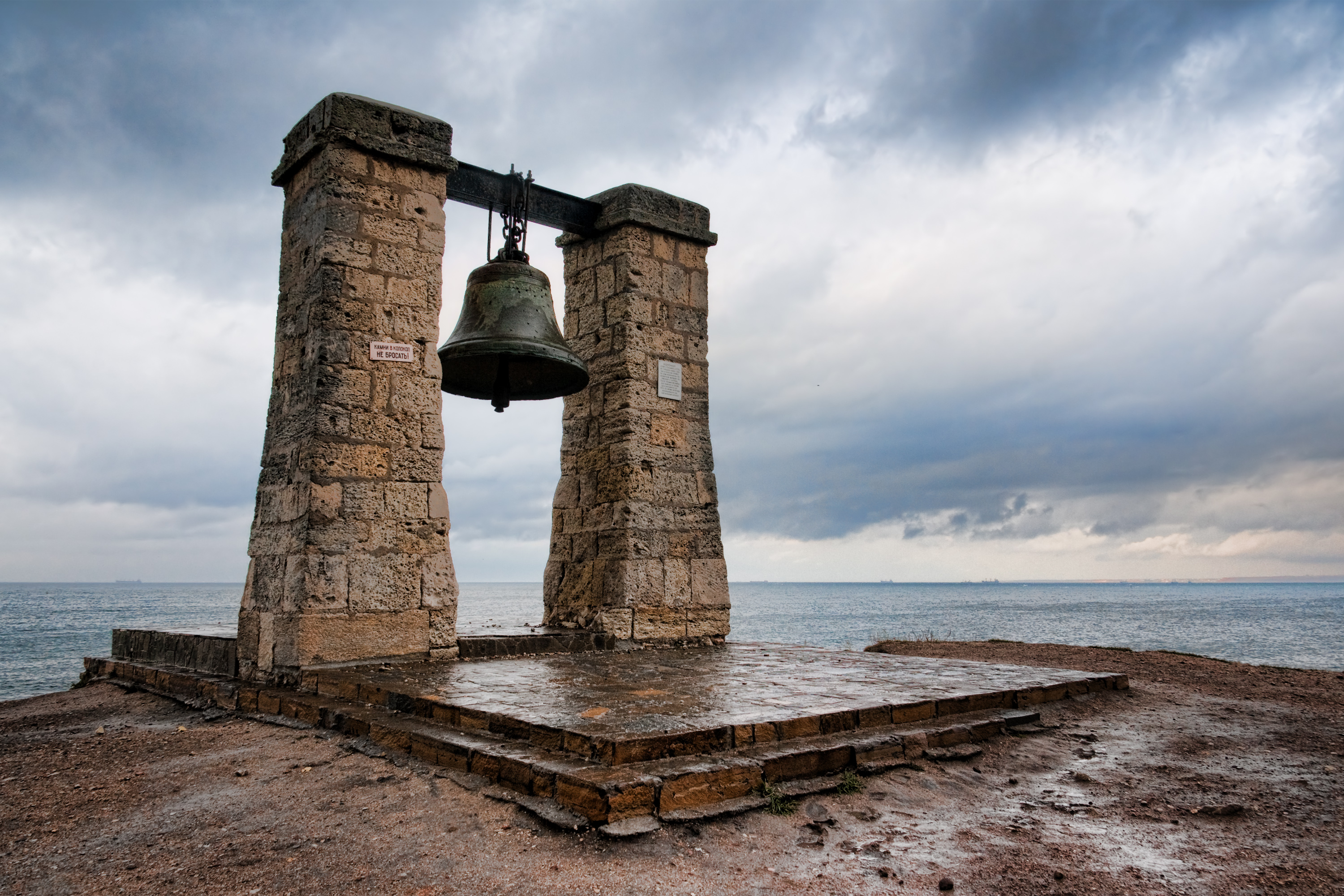
Bell in Chersonesus.

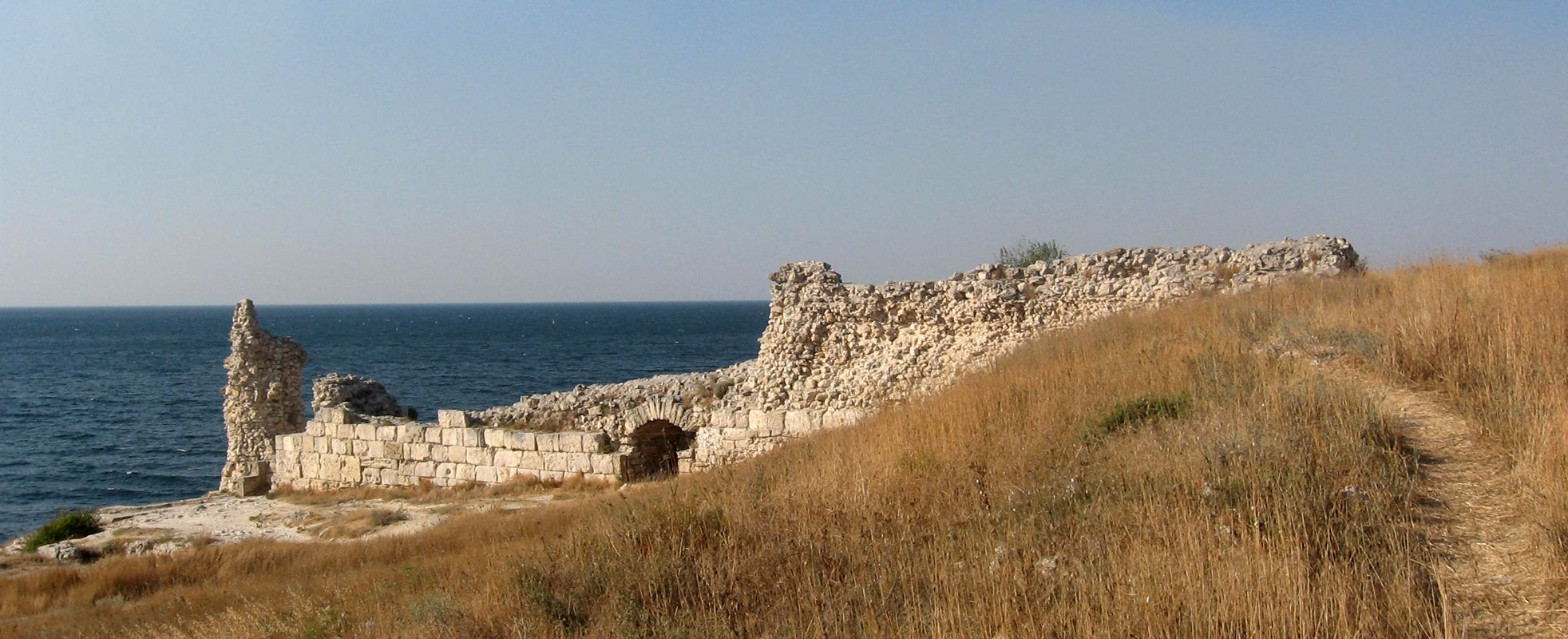
Western gate. View from the necropolis.

Not at all embarrassed by what had happened, Justinian ordered a new fleet to be equipped immediately. He stated that he would "plow up and level everything down to the walls". Then, as Nikephoros writes:

The archons of those regions, having learned of such a rumor, fortified themselves as best they could, and [in addition] sent envoys to the Khazars so that they would send an army for their protection and save those of them who survived.

The townspeople decided to declare the exile Bardanes the new emperor. The newly appointed archon Ilya also went over to the side of the rebels. He left his family in Constantinople. The chroniclers write that when Justinian found out about the treason, he personally executed his children right in front of their mother, and forced her to marry his cook. (Note: "An Indian by birth and ugly in appearance.")

If the assumption about the completion of the first expedition at the end of the previous year is correct, then the second expedition and related events should have begun in the spring, in the second half of March or April, with the opening of the navigation season.

Justinian decided to return the tudun and Zoilus back to Cherson and send ambassadors who were supposed to "justify themselves before the khagan". The minister of finance (logothetes tou genikou) George and the head of the capital (eparch of Constantinople) John were sent as ambassadors. This shows the serious importance Justinian attached to this mission. The military detachment this time was small, numbering only 300 stratioti from the Asia Minor Thracesian Theme under the command of turmarch Christopher. However, by the time the expedition reached Cherson, the uprising in the city was an accomplished fact. A Khazar army was already nearby, and it was larger than the arriving detachment. The residents let only George and John into the city and immediately killed them. They handed over the remaining soldiers, along with the tudun and Zoilus, to the Khazars. The Khazars went with them to the khagan.

It is not known how events might have developed in the case of a successful journey, but unfortunately for the Byzantines, the tudun died on the way. The Khazars, whose pagan custom was to accompany the funerals of noble persons with human sacrifices, organized a trizna and killed the entire Greek detachment at it.

== Third expedition of Justinian ==
Pope Constantine, who was on a visit to Constantinople at that moment, (Note: This was the third visit of a Pope to "New Rome" in history. The next one took place in 1967. Constantine arrived on the initiative of Justinian to discuss the decisions of the Quinisext Council, in which representatives of the Western Church did not participate. He was in the capital from spring to October 711. His solemn meeting with the emperor took place in Nicomedia and ended with the overcoming of all differences.) warned Justinian during his meeting with the emperor against sending troops against the rebels. Justinian did not listen.

An infuriated Justinian equipped a new large fleet, this time not only with men but also with siege equipment. Giving command to patrician Maurus Bessus, he ordered him to completely destroy Cherson and ruthlessly destroy the inhabitants. He demanded constant reports on the progress of the operation. Arriving at the site, Maurus began shelling and managed to destroy two fortress towers, Kentenarisios and Syagrus, located on the sea side. But at this moment the Khazar army approached the city. Chroniclers describe what happened next in one short phrase:

But then the Khazars came, and a truce ensued.

— Theophanes

But when the Khazar army suddenly attacked [the Romans], the city was saved.

— Nikephoros

After this event, or perhaps even before it, Bardanes left Cherson and fled to the Khazar khagan. Patrician Maurus did not know how to continue the siege under such conditions. Afraid to return to Constantinople, he decided to join the Chersonites. Everyone swore allegiance to Bardanes, proclaiming him the new emperor under the name Philippikos. An embassy was sent to the khagan asking to return the fugitive. The khagan demanded that the Byzantine army swear an oath of safety for Bardanes and, as a guarantee, pay a ransom of 1 nomisma (gold coin) for each soldier. The citizens of Cherson found the necessary amount, and Bardanes was released. Together with the fleet of patrician Maurus, he went to Constantinople.

Meanwhile, Justinian, not receiving news from the fleet, left the city. He found himself on the Asia Minor coast of the Bosphorus at the moment when the ships sailed up to the defenseless capital before his eyes. Bardanes freely entered the city. His first order was to kill the young augustus Tiberius. The boy was found in the Church of the Blachernae Mother of God. His grandmother, Empress Anastasia, had hidden him there and vainly begged the murderers to spare the innocent child. Tiberius was taken outside and slaughtered. The fate of Theodora is unknown. (Note: The late author Joannes Zonaras reports that Theodora had already died by that time. But as P. Grierson noted, in this case it is difficult to explain why there is no information about her grave in Byzantine sources.)

The troops received security guarantees from the new emperor and left Justinian. Ilya, the former archon of Cherson, appeared to the emperor and cut off his head. By order of Bardanes, the head was sent to Ravenna, where it was impaled on a spear and carried through the streets to the great joy of the local population. (Note: Then it was sent to Rome. There was a good attitude towards Justinian there, and the news of the reprisal against him was met with sorrow.)

== Outcomes and subsequent events ==
Bardanes Philippikos was overthrown by the military in 713. According to Theophanes, he "was considered learned and intelligent by his conversations, but in his deeds he lived indecently for a king and unworthily, in the eyes of everyone he seemed insignificant." His secretary Artemios was declared the new emperor (Anastasius II), who was also overthrown two years later. Theodosius III became the next weak emperor. The period of troubles ended with the advent of Leo III the Isaurian to power. The Isaurian dynasty he founded ruled Byzantium for over 80 years. Rebellions against its representatives happened, but not a single one was successful.

Relations between Byzantium and Khazaria became even closer. The war with the Syrian Umayyads threatened the capitals of both states. The Arab-Byzantine battles in Asia Minor and the Arab-Khazar battles in Transcaucasia went on simultaneously, not allowing the Arabs to concentrate all their forces on one sector. For Byzantium, the most critical point of confrontation was the 13-month Siege of Constantinople (717–718). An unusually severe winter, military assistance from the Bulgars again provided by Khan Tervel, and a Khazar expedition to Transcaucasia saved the empire from falling. The most impressive Khazar achievement was the offensive of 730 (Battle of Marj Ardabil), which reached Diyarbakır and the suburbs of Mosul. (Note: However, this practically did not change the overall strategic picture. In early 731, as traditionally happened in the Arab-Khazar wars, a fresh Arab army raided in the opposite direction, and now the Khazars were forced to defend against it deep in their territory. A few years later, the Khazars were forced to end the war on unfavorable terms, finally abandoning Transcaucasia.) Against the backdrop of this success, the Byzantine-Khazar alliance reached peak in 732. Leo III married his son Constantine (future Emperor Constantine V) to Princess Tzitzak, the daughter of Khagan Birkhor. She was named Irene at baptism. Their son, Leo IV the Khazar, later became a Byzantine emperor. Among other things, he continued the tradition and exiled his half-brothers, who participated in a conspiracy against him, to Cherson.

Cherson returned to Byzantium. After the events, the position of archon was established in it. The archon was a supreme official accountable to the central authority. Local residents were appointed archons (sometimes there could be several). However, they had the status of state officials, were included in the official lists of Byzantine positions (taktika), and used a seal of the Byzantine model. Over 80 such seals have been preserved from the 8th to the first half of the 9th centuries. In 841, Cherson, along with the rest of the Crimean territories, was transformed into a theme, a standard administrative unit of the empire. Sources mostly mention relations between Cherson and Khazaria in the context of missionary affairs with Christian communities in the territory of the khaganate. The Khazars approached the city twice more during periods of hostility with Byzantium: in 820 and 939. (Note: Approximate dates. Primary sources: Life of John of Psychaita and the Schechter Letter.) In both cases, these were unsuccessful sieges.

== Assessments in sources ==
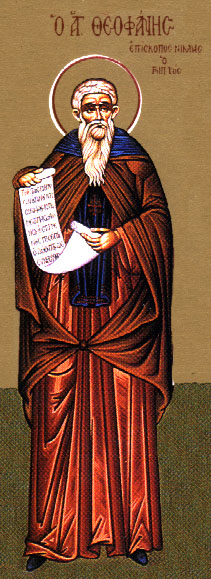
Theophanes the Confessor.

The events are known from two main sources that reflect the point of view of central Byzantine circles and are hostile to Justinian II. These are the "Chronographia" of Theophanes the Confessor and the "Breviarium" of Patriarch Nikephoros. Both chronicles retell a common source and give a very similar description, complementing each other in details. Theophanes preserved a greater number of details related to the Khazars. Theophanes is also characterized by a more figurative manner of presentation. The authors demonstrate a neutral attitude towards the khaganate: throughout the narrative, the Khazars are never defined as enemies and their actions are not called aggressive. Another valuable source is an anonymous Byzantine work called "Brief Historical Notes" (dating from the early 8th to the 9th century). This is a collection of stories about various sights of Constantinople. The 37th novella gives the name of the Khazar khagan and mentions that he and the ruler of Bulgaria, Tervel, visited Constantinople and received a large reward. A similar version of the story about the Basilica, without mentioning the Khazar khagan but detailing the reward received by Tervel, has been preserved in several later Byzantine sources, including the famous Suda dictionary.

There are no sources reflecting the Chersonite and Khazar version of events. How the Khazars themselves perceived the episode can be judged to some extent by a letter written in the mid-10th century by the Khazar ruler Joseph (Khazar Correspondence). In it, he lists his Crimean possessions and names 11 cities — practically all large settlements of the peninsula — but does not claim Cherson.

Sources from regions further away draw a picture with various inaccuracies. Paul the Deacon, author of the "History of the Lombards", knew nothing about the Khazars and Cherson. In his view, Justinian was in exile somewhere in the Black Sea region ("in Pontus"), and the organizer of the second overthrow was a certain Bardanes Philippikos. In contrast, the Armenian author Ghevond exaggerated the Khazar role, portraying Tervel as a commander of the Khazar khagan. Of the historians of the Caliphate, al-Masudi left the most detailed and generally accurate description. He explained that Justinian the "noseless" retained the ability to speak, despite having the frenulum under his tongue cut. According to al-Masudi, Justinian was exiled "to some peninsula", then fled, ended up with the king of the Khazars, married there, counted on Khazar help, but did not get it, and returned to power with the help of "the king of the Burjanes, Tarfale". In Syriac sources, Theophilus of Edessa and Agapius of Hierapolis preserved a fuller text of the letter the khagan wrote to Justinian. It coincides with the Greek in meaning and sarcasm. These same sources describe the expedition itself a little differently. According to them, the fleet sent by Justinian, numbering 50 ships, carried gifts, horses, and weapons for the khagan. All eastern sources considered Theodora not the sister, but the daughter of the khagan. Such information was probably also in the sources used by Nikephoros, since in one place of his work he calls the khagan her father.

== Assessments in historiography ==
Several questions are debated in historiography in connection with the Cherson events. The most general one concerns the territorial affiliation of Crimea in the 8th century. According to the traditional view, with the exception of Cherson, practically all the rest of Crimea was part of the Khazar Khaganate, and after the settlement of the Cherson incident, the possessions of both countries returned to the status quo. Alexander Aibabin, one of the modern researchers who share this view, formulates it as follows:

The reports of Theophanes and Nikephoros about the events that followed the exile of the dethroned Justinian to Cherson in 695 give grounds to speak about the capture of almost all of Crimea by the Khazars. <...> The Khazars recognized Cherson's belonging to the empire, but established their protectorate over the rest of Crimea and did not want to put up with the presence of large Byzantine troops even in Cherson.

A similar assessment is given by Andrey Vinogradov and Alexey Komar:

The state affiliation of any territory and any population is primarily determined by the final addressee of taxes, the supreme suzerain, which for Sugdaea and Bosporus in the 8th century was unequivocally the Khazar khagan, who carried out taxation through the mediation of local viceroys-tuduns. We do not yet have a single, even indirect, fact of the subordination of Bosporus and Sugdaea at this time to the Byzantine emperor or Byzantine state officials.

A number of modern researchers adhere to a different point of view. They consider that the thesis about the domination of the Khazars is largely a myth and Crimea always remained part of the Byzantine Empire. Sergey Sorochan proposed to consider Byzantine-Khazar relations in Crimea as a condominium. This means a joint possession with a special status, similar to that which Cyprus had (at that time divided between Byzantium and the Caliphate) and some other border Byzantine possessions. The main features of the condominium were the presence of authorities of two states on one territory, equal division of income from trade and taxes, and a demilitarized zone. Valery Naumenko agreed with this conclusion and expressed additional arguments in its favor using the example of Bosporus. A number of other historians followed suit, with the reservation that there is no direct information about the existence of Byzantine-Khazar agreements regarding Crimea in the sources.

Thus, the analysis of the sources available to us on the history of Taurica in the late 7th – mid-8th centuries shows that for the specified period of time there is no reason to speak of the establishment of Khazar domination or even a "protectorate" on the peninsula at this time. The most important coastal centers (Cherson, Bosporus, Sugdaea) continue to maintain a pro-Byzantine political, ideological and trade-economic orientation, and the mountainous regions of Crimean Gothia — a traditional "allied" status in relation to the empire. <...> The military-political alliance of Byzantium and the Khazars was maintained in the Northern Black Sea region not only by usual injections of imperial gold and rich gifts to the nomadic nobility, sometimes by dynastic marriages, but also by the introduction under Justinian II in Cherson and on the Bosporus of a regime of condominium management, which consisted in demilitarization and joint income from trade and customs operations within the districts.

Finally, Yury Mogarichev offers an even more skeptical interpretation. In his framework, it is generally impossible to speak about the reliable presence of the Khazar administration in Crimean cities. According to the researcher, "the only Khazar official who is recorded in Crimea at this time is the Cherson tudun".

Cherson, Bosporus and the Climates undoubtedly appear in the story with Justinian II as localities subordinate to Byzantium. The exile of Justinian to Cherson, the participation of the "Chersonites, Bosporans and other climates" in the plot against him, the desire of the latter to exterminate the entire people "in Cherson, Bosporus and other archonships", the proclamation of Bardanes Philippikos as emperor by the "Chersonites and residents of other fortresses" indicates that both the local population and Byzantine authors uniquely perceived these areas as Romaic, and not Khazar or with a status of dual subordination. <...> The entire policy of the khaganate in relation to Crimea was basically reduced to the possibility of receiving tribute. If the Khazars, against their will, found themselves drawn into intra-Byzantine conflicts on the territory of the peninsula, then here too the Khazars' claims were largely material, and not territorial or political.

Supporters of each point of view interpret the status of the three officials mentioned in connection with the Khazars (Papatzys, Balgitz, and the Tudun) differently.

Papatzys is the only one who is directly called a Khazar in the sources, but Theophanes and Nikephoros give him different characteristics. According to Theophanes, he is a representative "on behalf of the khagan" in Phanagoria; according to Nikephoros, he is a confidant of the khagan under Justinian. Thus, he was possibly an official sent from Khazaria who was not previously in Phanagoria.

Neither Theophanes nor Nikephoros speaks directly about the Khazar affiliation of Balgitz. He is called the "archon of Bosporus" and could have been a local dependent ruler. S. B. Sorochan and V. E. Naumenko believe that he was subordinate to Byzantium. Yu. M. Mogarichev considers him a Khazar governor not in the city of Bosporus itself, but on the Taman peninsula. This hypothesis is built on the fact that in Nikephoros, Bosporus is called "Scythian" and this could be a calque of the traditional name "Cimmerian Bosporus", which designated the Strait of Kerch. There is an additional argument in favor of Balgitz's Khazar affiliation. His name is compared with a Khazar title, which in a similar form "bul-sh-tzi" is known in the same region for the 10th century. What this title meant remains unclear.

The interpretation of the Tudun as a Khazar governor is also sometimes disputed in historiography, but at present this point of view has no supporters. Byzantine authors perceived the word "Tudun" as a personal name. Theophanes directly speaks about the subordination of the official to the Khazar khagan. In the Greek spelling of the word, there are variants. In one manuscript of Nikephoros and sometimes in Theophanes, it has the form "Tondun". Igor Baranov proposed to consider this form primary and gave an interpretation of Tondun as a Turk who was in Cherson in the Byzantine service as an archon.

A wide spread of opinions is observed around the question of the overall influence exerted by the Khazars on internal Byzantine politics. For the works of Khazarologists, an apologetic assessment is traditional. As the British historian D. M. Dunlop wrote:

In the course of these events we see that the Khazar khakan played a significant — if not dominant — role in the Crimea. By abandoning Justinian, he most likely made his fall inevitable. Philippikos Bardanes could hardly have succeeded without the khakan's support. It will not be an exaggeration to say that at this moment the khakan could have given a new ruler to the Greek Empire. <...> A few years after this they [the Khazars] were already ready to launch an offensive against Islam.

His Soviet colleague Mikhail Artamonov spoke in slightly more cautious but similar terms:

In all these events, the role of the Khazars was apparently more significant than indicated by the chroniclers. The subordination of Cherson to the Khazars occurred without pressure from the latter and was the result of the good will of the Chersonites themselves, dictated by fears of revenge from Justinian. Bardanes' plot, which found favorable ground for development among the Chersonites outraged by the cruel reprisal, could ripen only with the assistance of the Khazars.

Both authors believed that the true reason for Justinian's expeditions was an attempt to reconquer Crimea from the Khazars.

On the contrary, the works of Byzantinists usually emphasize that the initiative to overthrow Justinian came from the local Byzantine population, and the role of the Khazars was reduced to mercenary work. According to Igor Chichurov:

D. Dunlop sees in the overthrow of Justinian II and the proclamation of Bardanes as emperor evidence of the Khazars' domination in the Crimea and their influence on the development of events within the empire, which, obviously, should be considered an exaggeration: Byzantine emperors are overthrown, according to the testimony of Theophanes, and proclaimed by the Romaioi — Chersonites, residents of other Crimean fortresses, and soldiers sent by Justinian II. For such a high assessment of Khazar intervention, it seems to us, there are no weighty grounds.

In 2024, scientists from the Institute of Archaeology of Crimea of the Russian Academy of Sciences established that burial mounds discovered in 2021 during excavations in the vicinity of Simferopol belonged to the Khazar aristocracy. This is the first archaeological proof of the existence of Crimean Khazaria.

== See also ==
- Stone of Tmutarakan

== Bibliography ==
=== Primary sources ===
- Theophanes (1884). Летопись византийца Феофана от Диоклетиана до Царей Михаила и сына его Феофилакта [Chronicle of the Byzantine Theophanes from Diocletian to the Emperors Michael and his son Theophylact]. Translated by V. I. Obolensky. Moscow.
- Theophanes (1980). Византийские исторические сочинения: «Хронография» Феофана, «Бревиарий» Никифора. Тексты, перевод, комментарий [Byzantine Historical Works: "Chronographia" of Theophanes, "Breviarium" of Nikephoros. Texts, translation, commentary]. Translated by I. S. Chichurov. Moscow.
- Nikephoros (1980). Византийские исторические сочинения: «Хронография» Феофана, «Бревиарий» Никифора. Тексты, перевод, комментарий [Byzantine Historical Works: "Chronographia" of Theophanes, "Breviarium" of Nikephoros. Texts, translation, commentary]. Translated by I. S. Chichurov. Moscow.
- Preger, Theodor (1898). Anonymi Byzantini Παραστάσεις σύντομοι χρονικαί. München.
- Paul the Deacon (2004). История лангобардов. Кн. VI [History of the Lombards. Book VI]. Translated by D. N. Rakov.

=== Studies ===
- Aibabin, A. I. (1999). Этническая история ранневизантийского Крыма [Ethnic History of Early Byzantine Crimea]. Simferopol.
- Artamonov, M. I. (1962). История хазар [History of the Khazars]. Leningrad.
- Baranov, I. A. (1990). Таврика в эпоху раннего средневековья (салтово-маяцкая культура) [Taurica in the Early Middle Ages (Saltovo-Mayaki Culture)]. Kyiv.
- Beshevliev, V. (1959). "К вопросу о награде, полученной Тервелем от Юстиниана II в 705 г." [On the Question of the Reward Received by Tervel from Justinian II in 705]. Vizantiyskiy Vremennik. 16 (41).
- Borodin, O. R. (2001). Равеннский экзархат. Византийцы в Италии [Exarchate of Ravenna. Byzantines in Italy]. Saint Petersburg.
- Dunlop, D. M. (2016) [1954]. История хазар-иудеев [The History of the Jewish Khazars]. Translated by L. A. Igorevsky. Moscow.
- Kalinina, T. M. (2015). Сведения ал-Масуди и других восточных писателей о пребывании Юстиниана II у хазар и болгар [Information of al-Masudi and Other Eastern Writers About the Stay of Justinian II with the Khazars and Bulgars]. Moscow.
- Kalinina, T. M. (2016). "Письмо хазарского хакана Юстиниану II" [Letter of the Khazar Khakan to Justinian II]. Khazarskiy almanakh. 14. Moscow.
- Kazhdan, A. P. (2002). История византийской литературы (650—850 гг.) [History of Byzantine Literature (650–850)]. Saint Petersburg.
- Khrapunov, N. I. (2014). "К вопросу о роли городской общины в управлении византийским Херсоном в VIII—XI вв" [On the Question of the Role of the City Community in the Administration of Byzantine Cherson in the 8th–11th Centuries] (PDF). Antichnaya drevnost i sredniye veka. 42. Yekaterinburg.
- Kulakovsky, Yu. A. (1915). История Византии: (602—717) [History of Byzantium: (602–717)]. Vol. 3. Kyiv.
- Mogarichev, Yu. M. (2005). К вопросу о хазарах в Крыму в начале VIII в. [On the Question of the Khazars in Crimea in the Early 8th Century]. Jerusalem-Moscow.
- Naumenko, V. E. (2004). "Таврика в контексте византийско-хазарских отношений: опыт первых контактов" [Taurica in the Context of Byzantine-Khazar Relations: Experience of First Contacts]. Khazarskiy almanakh. 3. Kyiv-Kharkiv.
- Novoseltsev, A. P. (1990). Хазарское государство и его роль в истории Восточной Европы и Кавказа [The Khazar State and Its Role in the History of Eastern Europe and the Caucasus]. Moscow.
- Romanchuk, A. I. (2008). Исследования Херсонеса-Херсона. Раскопки. Гипотезы. Проблемы. Т. 2: Византийский город [Studies of Chersonesus-Cherson. Excavations. Hypotheses. Problems. Vol. 2: Byzantine City]. Tyumen.
- Semyonov, I. G. (2012). "Хазарско-византийские политические отношения во 2-й пол. VII — нач. VIII вв" [Khazar-Byzantine Political Relations in the 2nd Half of the 7th – Early 8th Centuries] (PDF). Vizantiyskiy Vremennik. 71(96). Moscow.
- Sorochan, S. B. (2007). "Византия и хазары в Таврике — господство или кондоминиум?" [Byzantium and the Khazars in Taurica — Domination or Condominium?] (PDF). Ukraina v Tsentralno-skhidniy Yevropi. 7.
- Sorochan, S. B. (2013). "Византийский Херсон в письме Анастасия Библиотекаря" [Byzantine Cherson in the Letter of Anastasius the Librarian] (PDF). Khazarskiy almanakh. 11. Kyiv-Kharkiv.
- Syuzyumov, M. Ya. (1967). S. D. Skazkin (ed.). Социально-политическая борьба и внешнее положение империи в конце VII — начале VIII в. [Socio-Political Struggle and the External Situation of the Empire in the Late 7th – Early 8th Century]. Moscow.
- Vachkova, V. (2008). "The Bulgarian Theme in Constantinople's Monuments (A new approach in the study of Bulgarian and Byzantine cultural memory)" (PDF). Palaebulgarica. 4.
- Vinogradov, A. Yu.; Komar, A. V. (2005). "Институт тудуна и хазары в юго-западном Крыму VIII — начала IX в. в контексте новых данных эпиграфики" [The Institution of the Tudun and the Khazars in Southwestern Crimea in the 8th – early 9th centuries in the Context of New Epigraphic Data]. Sugdeyskiy Sbornik. 2. Kyiv-Sudak.
