= Leendert G. Westerink =

Dutch philologist and university professor (1913–1990)

Leendert Gerrit Westerink (2 November 1913 – 24 January 1990) was a Dutch philologist and university professor, emeritus at the Department of Classics of the University of New York at Buffalo.

He was a specialist of Ancient Greek philosophical literature in prose, and widely studied its transmission and reception through Late antiquity and Byzantine Empire.

== Biography ==
Born in Velp, he studied at the University of Nijmegen, earning his MA in 1939 and his doctorate in 1948. He began his career teaching Ancient Greek, Latin and English at the Emmen high school from 1945 to 1965; in that year he moved to the U.S., having won a professorship at the University at Buffalo where he taught for the rest of his career, becoming Distinguished Professor of Classics in 1974. He was made emeritus upon his retirement in 1988.

He married Barbara Wilhelmina Schmidt in 1945 and their marriage lasted until his death in 1990, after a heart stroke.

== Research activity ==
Westerink was a Classicist and a Byzantinist, specializing in Greek philosophical prose. His scientific output is chiefly concerned with textual criticism and the edition of texts. His first major publication being an edition of Psellos' "De omnifaria doctrina", he worked mainly on Plato and Neoplatonism, including the Byzantine philosophers and commentators Proclus, Olympiodorus and Damascius.

Other than that, he studied and published texts by Germanus I of Constantinople, Theophylact Simocatta, the 10th-century rhetor Theodoros Daphnopates, Maximus Planudes, and the early 15th-century satirist Mazaris. (Note: Preliminary ed. in Westerink 1971.) In parallel, he worked on Greek medical texts and the transmission and reception of ancient medicine, contributing to the edition of the "Lectures on Galen's De sectis" by a 6th-century professor of medicine named Agnellus, and publishing the critical texts of the "Commentaries on Hippocrates' Aphorisms" by Stephanus of Athens. Germanus' treatise "On the Predestined Terms of Life", Simocates' on the same topic, Mazaris' satira and Agnellus' "Lectures" were edited co-working with the members of Seminar 609 of the University at Buffalo, and published in the departmental series "Arethusa Monographs". The same seminar prepared an edition of George Pachymeres' "Commentary on Plato's Parmenides".

He prepared the critical text of several works by Damascius, including the "Treatise of the First Principles" and the "Commentary on Plato's Parmenides" for the Collection Budé; in 1973, he edited the letters of the Byzantine statesman Nicetas Magistros (fl. IX-X cen.) for the French CNRS, and those of the Patriarch of Constantinople Nicholas I for the Corpus Fontium Historiae Byzantinae.

He also published Arethas' minor works and Photios' "Letters" and "Amphilochia" (theological opuscules) in the Bibliotheca Teubneriana. One of his last scientific enterprises was the organization and the launch of the critical edition of Michael Psellos' works, also for the Bibliotheca Teubneriana, which he contributed to by editing his poems and preparing a volume of the minor theological writings.

== Honors ==
Westerink was honored with a Festschrift in 1988 by his friends, scholars and colleagues, the year of his retirement:

- Duffy, J. M.; Peradotto, J., eds. (1988). Gonimos: Neoplatonic and Byzantine Studies Presented to Leendert G. Westerink at 75. Buffalo, New York: Department of Classics, University of New York at Buffalo.

== Bibliography ==
=== Critical editions ===
In chronological order.

- Psellus, Michael (1948). Westerink, L. G. (ed.). De omnifaria doctrina. Nijmegen: Centrale Drukkerij.
- Proclus (1954). Westerink, L. G. (ed.). Commentary on the first Alcibiades of Plato. Amsterdam: North Holland Publishing Co.
- Olympiodorus (1956). Westerink, L. G. (ed.). Commentary on the first Alcibiades of Plato. Amsterdam: North Holland Publishing Co.
- Damascius (1958). Westerink, L. G. (ed.). Lectures on the Philebus. Amsterdam: North Holland Publishing Co.
- Anonymus (1962). Westerink, L. G. (ed.). Prolegomena to Platonic Philosophy. Amsterdam: North Holland Publishing Co.
- Arethas (1968–1972). Westerink, L. G. (ed.). Scripta minora. Bibliotheca Teubneriana. Vol. I–II. Leipzig: B. G. Teubner.
- Pseudo-Elias (Pseudo-David) (1967). Westerink, L. G. (ed.). Lectures on Porphyry's Isagoge. Amsterdam: North Holland Publishing Co.
- Proclus (1968–1987). Westerink, L. G.; Saffrey, H. D. (eds.). Théologie Platonicienne. Collection Budé, G188, 230, 264, 282, 311, 379. Vol. I–VI. Paris: Les Belles Lettres.
- Olympiodorus (1970). Westerink, L. G. (ed.). In Platonis Gorgiam commentaria. Bibliotheca Teubneriana. Leipzig: B. G. Teubner.
- Nicetas Magistros (1973). Westerink, L. G. (ed.). Lettres d'un exilé (928-946). Le Monde Byzantin. Paris: Éditions du CNRS. ISBN 9782222015253.
- Nicholas I (1973). Jenkins, R. J. H.; Westerink, L. G. (eds.). Letters. Corpus Fontium Historiae Byzantinae 6 = Dumbarton Oaks Texts 2. Dumbarton Oaks: Center for Byzantine Studies.
- Mazaris (1975). Barry, J. N.; Share, M. J.; Smithies, A.; Westerink, L. G. (eds.). Journey to Hades; or Interviews with Dead Men about Certain Officials of the Imperial Court. Arethusa Monographs, 5. Buffalo, NY: Department of Classics, State University of N.Y. at Buffalo.
- Olympiodorus (1976). Westerink, L. G. (ed.). Commentary on Plato's Phaedo. The Greek Commentaries on Plato's Phaedo, 1. Amsterdam: North Holland Publishing Co.
- Damascius (1977). Westerink, L. G. (ed.). Commentary on Plato's Phaedo. The Greek Commentaries on Plato's Phaedo, 2. Amsterdam: North Holland Publishing Co.
- Daphnopates, Theodore (1978). Westerink, L. G.; Darrouzès, J. (eds.). Correspondance. Le Monde Byzantin. Paris: Éditions du CNRS. ISBN 9782222022251.
- Simocates, Theophylactus (1978). Garton, Ch.; Westerink, L. G. (eds.). On Predestined Terms of Life. Arethusa Monographs, 6. Buffalo, NY: Department of Classics, State University of N.Y. at Buffalo.
- Germanos (1979). Garton, Ch.; Westerink, L. G. (eds.). On Predestined Terms of Life. Arethusa Monographs, 7. Buffalo, NY: Department of Classics, State University of N.Y. at Buffalo.
- Agnellus (1981). Davies, D. O.; Dickson, K. M.; Kershaw, A.; Peters, J. P.; Robbins, B. K.; Virginia, Th. A.; Walsh, J. J.; Westerink, L. G. (eds.). Lectures on Galen's De sectis. Arethusa Monographs, 8. Buffalo, NY: Department of Classics, State University of N. Y. at Buffalo.
- Photios (1983–1988). Westerink, L. G.; Laourdas, B. S. (eds.). Epistulae et Amphilochia. Bibliotheca Teubneriana. Vol. I–VI. Leipzig: B. G. Teubner.
- Damascius (1986–1991). Westerink, L. G.; Combès, J. (eds.). Traité des Premiers Principes. Collection Budé, G309, 323, 341. Vol. I–III. Paris: Les Belles Lettres. (Vol. III posthumous)
- Pachymeres, George (1989). Gadra, T. A.; Honea, S. M.; Stinger, P. M.; Umholtz, G. (eds.). Commentary on Plato's Parmenides. Corpus Philosophorum Medii Aevi • Philosophi Byzantini, 4. Introduction by L. G. Westerink. Αθήνα – Paris – Bruxelles: Ακαδημία Αθηνών – Libraire J. Vrin – Éditions Ousia.
- Anonymus (1990). Westerink, L. G.; Trouillard, J.; Segonds, A. Ph. (eds.). Prolégomènes à la philosophie de Platon. Collection Budé, G335. Paris: Les Belles Lettres. ISBN 9782251004129.
- Psellus, Michael (1992). Westerink, L. G. (ed.). Poemata. Bibliotheca Teubneriana. Stuttgart – Leipzig: B. G. Teubner. ISBN 3815416620. (posthumous)
- Stephanus (1992). Westerink, L. G. (ed.). Commentary on Hippocrates' Aphorisms, sections V–VI. Corpus Medicorum Graecorum, XI 1, 3, 3. Vol. III. Berlin: Akademie Verlag. ISBN 3050024488. (posthumous)
- Damascius (1997–2003). Westerink, L. G.; Segonds, A. Ph. (eds.). Commentaire du Parménide de Platon. Collection Budé, G375, 344, 418, 428. Vol. I–IV. Paris: Les Belles Lettres. (posthumous)
- Stephanus (1998) [1985]. Westerink, L. G. (ed.). Commentary on Hippocrates' Aphorisms, sections I–II. Corpus Medicorum Graecorum, XI 1, 3, 1. Vol. I (2nd ed.). Berlin: Akademie Verlag. ISBN 3050032839.
- Psellus, Michael (2002). Westerink, L. G.; Duffy, J. M. (eds.). Theologica Minora. Bibliotheca Teubneriana. Vol. II. München – Leipzig: K. G. Saur. ISBN 3598716648. (posthumous)

=== Articles ===
- Westerink, L. G. (1966). "Le Basilikos de Maxime Planude". Byzantinoslavica. 27: 98–103.
- Westerink, L. G. (1967). "Le Basilikos de Maxime Planude (suite)". Byzantinoslavica. 28 (1): 54–67.
- Westerink, L. G. (1968a). "Ficino's marginal notes on Olympiodorus in Riccardi Greek MS 37". Traditio. 24: 351–378. JSTOR 27830852.
- Westerink, L. G. (1968b). "Le Basilikos de Maxime Planude (suite)". Byzantinoslavica. 29: 34–50.
- Westerink, L. G. (1971). "Theophylactus Simocates on Predestination". Studi filologici e storici in onore di Vittorio De Falco. Naples: Libreria Scientifica Editrice. pp. 533–551.
- Westerink, L. G. (1972). "Marginalia by Arethas in Moscow Greek MS 231". Byzantion. 42: 196–244. JSTOR 44170343.
- Westerink, L. G. (1986). "Leo the Philosopher: Job and other poems". Illinois Classical Studies. 11: 193–222. JSTOR 23064080.
- Westerink, L. G. (1987). "Le Parisinus Gr. 1182 et le Vaticanus Gr. 671 de Psellos". In Dummer, J.; Irmscher, J. (eds.). Texte und Textkritik: eine Aufsatzsammlung (in French). Berlin: Akademie Verlag. pp. 605–610.
