= Eudokia (wife of Justinian II) =

Byzantine empress c.685–695

Empress of the Byzantine Empire
- Tenure: c. 685 – c. 695
- Born: 7th century
- Died: 7th century Constantinople (now Istanbul, Turkey)
- Burial: Church of the Holy Apostles
- Spouse: Justinian II
- Dynasty: Heraclian Dynasty

Eudokia (Greek: Εὐδοκία, romanized: Evdókia) was the first empress consort of Byzantine Emperor Justinian II.

== Empress ==
The name and place of burial of Eudokia in the Church of the Holy Apostles was recorded in De Ceremoniis by Constantine VII. However little else is known of her. She is presumed to have been married to Justinian II during his first reign (685–695) and to have either predeceased him or divorced him by the time of his second marriage to Theodora of Khazaria in 703.

At some point before the Council in Trullo in 692, Eudokia appears to have aided in the migration of the bishop John and other Orthodox Cypriots to Cyzicus in an unknown capacity.

A daughter of Justinian is reported by the chronicle of Theophanes the Confessor and the Chronographikon syntomon of Ecumenical Patriarch Nikephoros I of Constantinople to have been betrothed to Tervel of Bulgaria between 704 and 705. Her name is presumed to have been "Anastasia", after her paternal grandmother, Anastasia. She is the only known child attributed to Eudokia.

== Possible descendants ==
Modern genealogists have theorised Eudokia and Justinian II may have descendants among later Bulgarian and Byzantine royalty and nobility. The theories are based primarily on the proposed marriage of their daughter "Anastasia" to Tervel of Bulgaria in c. 704 – c. 705. However, the primary Byzantine sources record only the betrothal (or promise) of a daughter to Tervel, without confirming a consummated marriage or subsequent offspring, and the Bulgarian royal genealogies of the period are described only in fragmentary fashion. Thus, the evidence for any further descendants remains speculative than firmly documented.

== See also ==
- List of Byzantine emperors
- List of Roman and Byzantine Empresses

Royal titles
Preceded by Anastasia	Byzantine Empress consort c. 685–695	Succeeded by Theodora of Khazaria
