= Stephen the Persian =

Stephen the Persian (Greek: Στέφανος ὁ Πέρσης; died 695) was a chief eunuch and sakellarios of the Byzantine Empire, who wielded great influence and power during the first reign of Justinian II (r. 685–695, 705–711).

Stephen was of Persian origin. In 694, he was ordered to oversee the construction projects of Justinian II, including at the Great Palace of Constantinople. Later Byzantine writers (Nikephoros I of Constantinople and Theophanes the Confessor), were hostile towards him. Nikephoros described Stephen as "lordly and authoritative, exceedingly bloodthirsty and cruel". Theophanes wrote that he was extremely cruel towards the workmen assigned to the building projects. He was also said to be brutal in his behavior towards the mother of Justinian II, Anastasia. According to Theophanes, he beat her while Justinian was away. He mistreated the citizens of Constantinople in a harsh manner in general; this contributed greatly to the public dissatisfaction with Justinian II.

In 695, Justinian II was overthrown by his own citizens and forced into exile. During the chaos that erupted an angry mob captured Stephen, dragged him along the Mese to the Forum of the Ox, and burned him alive.

== Sources ==
- Hollingsworth, Paul A. (1991). "Stephen the Persian". In Kazhdan, Alexander (ed.). The Oxford Dictionary of Byzantium. Oxford and New York: Oxford University Press. ISBN 0-19-504652-8.
- Tougher, Shaun (2008). The Eunuch in Byzantine History and Society. Routledge. p. 54. ISBN 978-1135235710.
