= Balgitzin =

Khaxar leader

Balgitzin (Greek: Βαλγίτζιν Valgítzin; died 704), in the account of Theophanes the Confessor, was the Khazar tudun of Phanagoria during the sojourn of Justinian II in that town. He was dispatched, along with Papatzys, by Busir Khagan to kill Justinian in 704, after Busir was bribed by Tiberius III. Justinian's Khazar wife Theodora warned him in advance and Justinian escaped by sea, but not before murdering both Papatzys and Balgitzin.

Some scholars, notably Peter B. Golden, have speculated that Balgitzin is not a proper name but rather a title, identical with Baliqchi. Vladimir Minorsky proposes that Balgitzin translates as "the fisherman".
