= Papatzys =

Papatzys (Greek: Παπατζύν Papatzýn; died 704) was, in the account of Theophanes the Confessor, the Khazar tudun of Kerch during the sojourn of Byzantine emperor Justinian II in Phanagoria. In 704 Busir Khagan was bribed by Tiberius III to kill Justinian, and dispatched Papatzys and another official named Balgitzin to do the deed. Warned in advance by his Khazar wife Theodora, Justinian murdered both Papatzys and Balgitzin and escaped by sea.
