= Theodora of Khazaria =

Byzantine empress from 705 to 711

Empress of the Byzantine Empire
- Tenure: 705–711
- Spouse: Justinian II
- Issue: Tiberius
- Dynasty: Heraclian Dynasty

Theodora of Khazaria (Greek: Θεοδώρα τῶν Χαζάρων, romanized: Theodṓra thou Khazária) was Byzantine empress as the second wife of Justinian II. She was a sister of Busir, khagan of the Khazars.

== Marriage ==
Justinian II had first succeeded to the throne in 685. In 695, Justinian was deposed by a coup d'état under strategos Leontius. Justinian's nose was slit and he was exiled to Cherson in Crimea.

Justinian stayed in Cherson for about seven years with no apparent incident. However rumors that the deposed emperor was plotting his restoration came to the attention of the city authorities c. 702. They decided to arrest and send him to Constantinople, surrendering his fate to Tiberius III. Justinian instead escaped Cherson and sought refuge in the court of Busir.

Busir welcomed the exile and formed a familial relation to Justinian by marrying him to his sister, whose original name is unknown, in 703. Theodora was her baptismal name and marks her conversion to Chalcedonian Christianity. The name was probably chosen to evoke memories of Theodora, wife of Justinian I. Busir provided the couple with funds and a house in Phanagoria.

Tiberius eventually took notice of the new marital alliance and bribed Busir in exchange for the head of Justinian. According to the chronicle of Theophanes the Confessor, c. 704 Busir dispatched two agents to murder his brother-in-law, Balgitzin and Papatzys. Theodora became aware of their mission and warned her husband in advance, enabling him to strangle both men and sail in a fishing boat back to Cherson.

Theodora was left behind in the custody of her brother. Their only known son Tiberius is considered to have been born at some point during the separation of his parents, indicating Theodora was pregnant prior to the escape.

== Empress ==
Leading an army of 15,000 horsemen provided by his new ally Tervel of Bulgaria, Justinian entered Constantinople in 705 and regained the throne. This made Theodora the new empress consort, but she was still in the custody of her brother.

According to the chronicle of Theophanes and the Chronographikon syntomon of Ecumenical Patriarch Nikephoros I of Constantinople, Justinian was planning to reclaim his wife by force. In 705/706, a detachment of the Imperial navy, sent to the Sea of Azov to escort Theodora back, was sunk by a storm before reaching its destination.

Busir wrote to his brother-in-law and informed him that war was unnecessary. He was free to reclaim Theodora as soon as he sent emissaries to escort her and, according to Theophanes, he also informed Justinian of the existence of his son, Tiberius. Theophylaktos, a koubikoularios, was sent to bring them back to Constantinople with no further incident. Theodora was crowned Augusta and Tiberius was proclaimed co-emperor to secure his succession rights.

== Deposition ==
During his second reign, Justinian proved to be merciless in his pursuit of vengeance against supporters of Leontius and Tiberius III. Discontent over his harsh rule led to a further conflict for the throne. In 711, a new revolt started in Cherson under the exiled general Philippicus, and Busir lent his support to the rebels.

Justinian was absent in Armenia when the revolt started, and was unable to return in time to defend Constantinople. He was arrested and executed outside the city in December 711. Despite the efforts of Anastasia, Justinian's mother, Philippicus' men killed the six-year-old Tiberius as well, thus eradicating the line of Heraclius.

Whether Theodora was still alive during the events remains unclear. Theophanes and Nikephoros make no mention of her when recounting the deposition. Joannes Zonaras presumed her to be already deceased, but he was writing four centuries after the events and the factual accuracy of his statement is debatable. Unlike other empresses, there is no tomb mentioned for her and the year and manner of her death remains unknown.

== Children ==
Theodora and Justinian II had only one known child:

- Tiberius (c. 705 – 711, co-emperor from 706 to 711). Executed by orders of Philippicus.

== See also ==
- Khazar Protectorate over Cherson

Royal titles
Preceded by Eudokia	Byzantine Empress consort 705–711	Succeeded by Maria
