= John I (archbishop of Cyprus) =

John (Greek: Ἰωάννης) was the archbishop of Cyprus in the late 7th century, during the temporary relocation of much of the Cypriot population, and the see of the Church of Cyprus, to Cyzicus in northwestern Asia Minor.

John was originally archbishop of Salamis on Cyprus, and hence head of the autocephalous Church of Cyprus. In 688, the Byzantine emperor Justinian II and the Umayyad caliph Abd al-Malik concluded a treaty that made the island a neutral condominium, not occupied by either of the two, and with revenue shared between them.

Sometime after that, but before 691, Emperor Justinian II decided to resettle the Cypriots in the Byzantine Empire: John with his flock were moved to Artake, near Cyzicus on the shores of the Sea of Marmara. The emperor's motive was probably to repopulate the area, which had suffered from the depredations of the Umayyads during the previous decade; Cyzicus had even been the base of the Umayyad fleet during the First Arab Siege of Constantinople in 674–678. The De administrando imperio of the 10th-century Byzantine emperor Constantine VII Porphyrogennetos, on the other hand, attributes this move to the initiative of John himself, whom he has travelling in person to Constantinople for this purpose in 691.

According to the 39th canon of the Quinisext Council of 691/92, the town, and John's episcopal see, was renamed to Nea Ioustinianoupolis (Greek: Νέα Ἰουστινιανούπολις, "New City of Justinian"), and John was allowed to retain the same privileges granted to the Church of Cyprus in the Council of Ephesus in 431, namely his archiepiscopal rank and autocephalous status. John thus became the metropolitan bishop of the ecclesiastical eparchy of Hellespontus, much to the displeasure of the previous incumbent, the metropolitan of Cyzicus, who was demoted to the rank of a simple bishop and subordinated to the see of Nea Ioustinianoupolis. John's prominence is underscored by the fact that he signed the canons of the Quinisext Council, which he attended, in seventh place among all prelates participating.

The Cypriots' exile did not last long; only seven years according to Constantine VII. Most modern scholars have thus reconstructed that in 698/99, the Cypriots returned to their island after an agreement between Abd al-Malik and the Emperor Tiberios III. This marked also the end of the see of Nea Ioustinianoupolis, which disappears from the record, while Cyzicus received its previous rights as metropolitan see back.

John was possibly succeeded as archbishop by Anthimos, who probably held office c. 700.

== Sources ==
- Ditten, Hans (1993). Ethnische Verschiebungen zwischen der Balkanhalbinsel und Kleinasien vom Ende des 6. bis zur zweiten Hälfte des 9. Jahrhunderts (in German). Berlin: Akademie Verlag. ISBN 3-05-001990-5.
- Kazhdan, Alexander, ed. (1991). The Oxford Dictionary of Byzantium. Oxford and New York: Oxford University Press. ISBN 0-19-504652-8.
- Lilie, Ralph-Johannes; Ludwig, Claudia; Pratsch, Thomas; Zielke, Beate (2013). Prosopographie der mittelbyzantinischen Zeit Online. Berlin-Brandenburgische Akademie der Wissenschaften. Nach Vorarbeiten F. Winkelmanns erstellt (in German). Berlin and Boston: De Gruyter.
