= Tiberius (son of Justinian II) =

Byzantine co-emperor from 705 to 711

- Emperor of the Romans
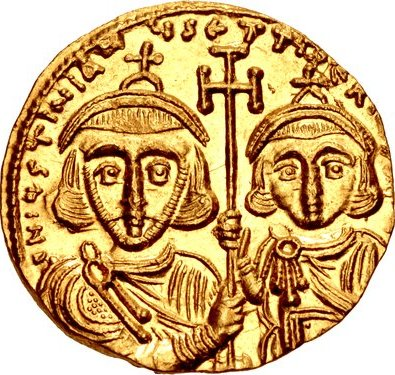
- Solidus of Justinian with Tiberius, marked: d n iustinianus et tiberi(us pp a)

Byzantine co-emperor
- Reign: 706–711
- Coronation: 706
- Predecessor: Justinian II
- Successor: Philippicus
- Born: 705; Khazaria
- Died: 711 (Aged 6); St. Mary's Church in Blachernae, Constantinople Eastern Roman Empire (now Istanbul, Turkey)
- Dynasty: Heraclian
- Father: Justinian II
- Mother: Theodora of Khazaria

Tiberius (Greek: Τιβέριος, romanized: Tibérios; 705–711), sometimes enumerated as Tiberius IV, was the son of Emperor Justinian II and Theodora of Khazaria. He served as co-emperor of the Byzantine Empire with his father Justinian II, from 706 to 711. Both were killed in 711, when Bardanes led a rebellion which marched on Constantinople. After Tiberius' death, two different individuals impersonated him, with one, named Bashir, going on to be hosted by Hisham ibn Abd al-Malik, the Umayyad caliph, before his lie was discovered and he was crucified.

== History ==
In 705, Justinian II, who had previously been emperor of the Byzantine Empire from 685 to 695, but had been usurped by Leontius, used a vast army of Khazars, Bulgars, and Slavs to retake the throne from Tiberius III, who had in turn overthrown Leontius. While Justinian led troops into the Empire, he left his wife, Theodora of Khazaria, behind in Phanagoria, the capital of former Old Great Bulgaria, but at the time a principal city of the Khazar Empire. While there, she gave birth to Tiberius. Once Justinian had consolidated his hold on the throne, he sent for his wife and his newly born son. When they arrived in Constantinople in 706, Theodora and Tiberius were crowned augusta and augustus. In 710, when Pope Constantine visited Constantinople, he was welcomed by the Byzantine Senate and the young co-emperor Tiberius, before Constantine went on to meet Justinian II.

In 711, the Theme of Cherson rebelled against Justinian II, led by an exiled general by the name of Bardanes. The rebels resisted a counter-attack, before the forces sent to attack the rebels themselves joined the rebellion. The rebels marched on the capital, Constantinople, and proclaimed Bardanes as Emperor Philippicus. During this time, Justinian II had been traveling to Armenia, and thus did not arrive in Constantinople in time to defend it, but only after it had fallen. He was arrested, and then executed outside the city in November 711. His head was kept by Bardanes as a trophy. Upon hearing the news of his death, Anastasia, Justinian's mother, took Tiberius, at this time six years old, to St. Mary's Church in Blachernae, for sanctuary. He was pursued by men sent by Bardanes, who dragged him from the altar and murdered him outside of the church.

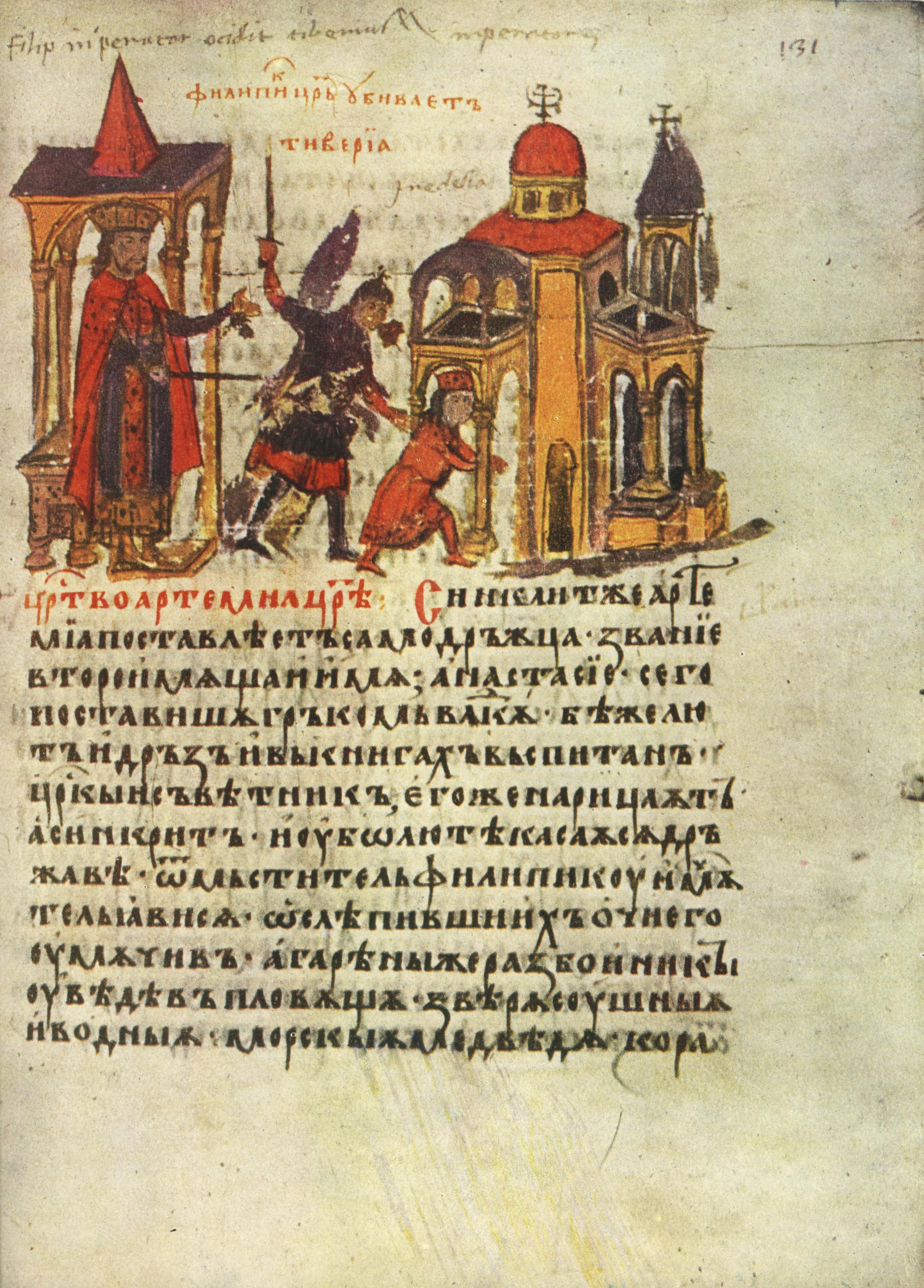
Philippicus sends his men to execute Tiberius. Scene from the 12th century Manasses Chronicle

Two separate individuals later arose claiming to be Tiberius: one in 717/718 during the Siege of Constantinople by the Arabs; and another in 737. The second impostor, a man by the name of Bashir, plotted with a blind man named Theophantus. They arranged that Theophantus would go to Sulayman ibn Hisham, an Arab general, and son of the Umayyad caliph Hisham ibn Abd al-Malik, and inform him that he knew the location of Tiberius, who was actually Bashir himself. Sulayman believed Theophantus and instructed him to bring Bashir to him, which Theophantus agreed to do in exchange for money. Theophantus then delivered Bashir to Sulayman, whereupon Bashir denied being Tiberius profusely, so as to make Sulayman certain that he really was Tiberius. After many promises of safety and reward were given, he "confessed" that he was Tiberius. Sulayman immediately wrote to his father, Hisham, who instructed him to dress the false Tiberius in royal clothes and to have him pass through all major cities in procession. Bashir then went first to Edessa, and then the other major cities. After this, he went to Hisham, who received him with honor. Bashir stayed with Hisham, sending ambassadors to Constantinople to proclaim that Tiberius was still alive, and allied with the Umayyad. This news frightened the Byzantines, especially Emperor Leo III. However, Bashir's deception was eventually revealed, and he was crucified in Edessa.

== Numismatics ==
Tiberius can be found on coins issued during the second reign of Justinian II (705–711). During Justinian II's first reign (686–695), the first coins to bear a depiction of Jesus Christ on the obverse were minted. During his second reign, Tiberius was featured on the reverse of the coins, alongside Justinian II. On the reverse, Tiberius and Justinian II both wear crowns, loros, and chlamys, and hold cross potents in their hands. The legend of the reverse reads: "Domini Nostri Iustinianus et Tiberius Perpetui Augusti", meaning "Our Lords Justinian and Tiberius, the Eternal Emperors".
