= Stephanus of Athens =

Greek physician and writer

Stephanus of Athens (Greek: Στέφανος ό Άθηναίος; lived c. 540–680), also called Stephanus the Philosopher, was a Byzantine Greek physician and writer. A Christian native of Athens, he studied at Alexandria under a certain Asclepius, possibly Asclepius of Tralles. He later practised and taught medicine there.

Stephanus wrote at least five works in Greek, four of which survive. These are commentaries on the Aphorisms and Prognostics of Hippocrates; a commentary on the first book of the Therapeutics to Glaucon of Galen; and Peri ouron, a treatise on uroscopy. The work On Pulses is lost. An alphabetized epitome of the De materia medica of Dioscorides has also been attributed to Stephanus and a redaction of a commentary by Palladius on the Fractures of Hippocrates attributed to Stephanus of Alexandria may in fact be the work of Stephanus of Athens. It has even been suggested that the two Stephani are in fact a single individual.

Stephanus' commentaries are structured as a series of lectures (praxeis) and discussions (theoriai) in the fashion of the school of Ammonius of Alexandria, the teacher of Asclepius of Tralles. He demonstrates familiarity with Greek philosophy and had probably studied it alongside medicine.
