= Busir =

King of Khazaria

Busir or Bazir (Greek: Ibousiros Gliabanos, Busir Glavan; fl. 688–711) was the Khazar khagan in the late 7th century and early 8th century.

== Reign ==
He was probably the Khagan that defeated Asparukh then killed him at battle, after the latter tried to reclaim former Bulgar lands in Ukraine.

In 704 Justinian II, who had been exiled at Chersonesos for nine years, arrived at Busir's court. Busir, perhaps seeking to use him in his political maneuverings with the Byzantine Empire, welcomed Justinian and gave him his sister in marriage (the woman's Khazar name is unknown, but she took the baptismal name of Theodora). Busir provided the couple with funds and a house in Phanagoria.

However, the winds of realpolitik soon shifted, and the new emperor, Tiberius III, offered Busir a substantial bounty for his brother-in-law's head. Busir dispatched two agents, Balgitzin and Papatzys, to kill Justinian, but the latter was warned by his wife, who bribed the assassins' slaves to learn the nature of their mission. Turning the tables on his would-be killers, Justinian murdered the pair after a banquet and fled Phanagoria by ship, seeking aid from Khan Tervel of Bulgaria, with whose help he retook Constantinople.

Busir now attempted to make peace with Justinian, sending Theodora to Constantinople. He later became involved with, possibly instigating, a revolt by Justinian's officers in the Crimea, which led ultimately to the crowning of Philippikos Bardanes as emperor and the death of Justinian in 711.
