= Justinian II =

Byzantine emperor from 685 to 695 and 705 to 711

- Emperor of the Romans
- Idealized mosaic of a young Justinian II (aged 10–13), Basilica of Sant'Apollinare in Classe, Ravenna. (Note: Justinian II is depicted being a tall young man in height when in reality he was 13 years old at the most. The mosaic was made before 681, as he’s depicted alongside the co-emperors Heraclius and Tiberius (all of whom are depicted as being as tall as Constantine IV despite the age differences).)

Byzantine emperor
- 1st reign: 10 July 685 – 695
- Predecessor: Constantine IV
- Successor: Leontius
- 2nd reign: 21 August 705 – 4 November 711
- Predecessor: Tiberius III
- Successor: Philippicus
- Co-emperor: Tiberius (706–711)
- Born: 668 or 669; Constantinople
- Died: 4 November 711 (aged 42) (Note: The Oxford Dictionary of Byzantium misquotes Philip Grierson's "Tombs and Obits" and states that Justinian II died on 7 November, when the text clearly indicates 4 November.); Damatrys, Opsikion
- Spouse: Eudokia; Theodora of Khazaria
- Issue: Anastasia; Tiberius
Regnal name
- Latin: Imperator Caesar Flavius Iustinianus Augustus; Greek: Αὐτοκράτωρ καῖσαρ Φλάβιος Ἰουστινιανός αὐγουστος (Note: His name is rarely given as Flavius Heraclius Iustinianus in older sources, but this is not corroborated by modern historians or contemporary coins or writings.)
- Dynasty: Heraclian
- Father: Constantine IV
- Mother: Anastasia
- Religion: Chalcedonian Christianity

Justinian II (Greek: Ἰουστινιανός, romanized: Ioustinianós; Latin: Iustinianus; 668/69 – 4 November 711), nicknamed "the Slit-Nosed" (Greek: ὁ Ῥινότμητος, romanized: ho Rhīnótmētos), was the last Byzantine emperor of the Heraclian dynasty, reigning from 685 to 695 and again from 705 to 711. Like his namesake predecessor, Justinian I, Justinian II was an ambitious and passionate ruler who was keen to restore the Roman Empire to its former glories. However, he responded brutally to any opposition to his will and lacked the finesse of his father, Constantine IV. Consequently, he generated enormous opposition to his reign, resulting in his deposition in 695 in a popular uprising. He only returned to the throne in 705 with the help of a Bulgarian army. His second reign was even more despotic than the first, and in 711 he was killed by mutinous soldiers.

== First reign ==
Justinian II was the eldest son of Emperor Constantine IV and Anastasia. His father appointed him as his heir sometime after October 682, upon the deposition of his uncles Heraclius and Tiberius. (Note: Theophanes the Confessor states that Constantine ruled alongside Justinian after the fall of Heraclius and Tiberius. However, all the evidence indicates that he became augustus only on his father's death.) In 685, at the age of sixteen, Justinian II succeeded his father as sole emperor.

As a result of Constantine IV's victories, the political situation in the Eastern provinces of the Empire was stable when Justinian ascended the throne. After a preliminary strike against the Arabs in Armenia, Justinian managed to augment the sum paid by the Umayyad Caliphs as an annual tribute, and to regain control of part of Cyprus. The incomes of the provinces of Armenia and Iberia were divided among the two empires. In 687, as part of his agreements with the Caliphate, Justinian removed from their native Lebanon 12,000 Christian Mardaites, who continually resisted the Arabs. Additional resettlement efforts, aimed at the Mardaites and inhabitants of Cyprus, allowed Justinian to reinforce naval forces depleted by earlier conflicts. In 688, Justinian signed a treaty with the Caliph Abd al-Malik ibn Marwan which rendered Cyprus neutral ground, with its tax revenue split.

This enabled Justinian to turn his attention to the Balkans, where much imperial territory had been lost to Slavic tribes. In 687 Justinian transferred cavalry troops from Anatolia to Thrace. With a great military campaign in 688–689, Justinian defeated the Slavs of Macedonia and was finally able to enter Thessalonica, the second most important Byzantine city in Europe.

The subdued Slavs were resettled in Anatolia, where they were to provide a military force of 30,000 men. Emboldened by the increase of his forces in Anatolia, Justinian now renewed the war against the Arabs, winning a battle in Armenia in 693. The Arabs met the challenge by bribing the new army to revolt. Most of the Slavic troops defected during the subsequent Battle of Sebastopolis, where Justinian was comprehensively defeated and compelled to flee to the Propontis. There, according to Theophanes, he vented his frustration by slaughtering as many of the Slavs in and around Opsikion as he could lay his hands on. Meanwhile, a Patrician named Symbatius rebelled in Armenia and opened up the province to the Arabs, who proceeded to conquer it in 694–695.

In domestic affairs, the Emperor's bloody persecution of the Manichaeans, and his suppression of the popular traditions of those who were not of Chalcedonian origin, caused dissension within the Church. In 692 Justinian convened the so-called Quinisext Council at Constantinople to put his religious policies into effect. The Council expanded and clarified the rulings of the Fifth and Sixth ecumenical councils, but by highlighting differences between the Eastern and Western observances (such as the marriage of priests and the Catholic practice of fasting on Saturdays) it also compromised Byzantine relations with the Catholic Church. The emperor ordered Pope Sergius I arrested, but the militias of Rome and Ravenna sided with the Pope and rebelled.

Justinian contributed to the development of the thematic organization of the Empire, creating a new theme of Hellas in southern Greece and numbering the heads of the four major themes of the Opsikion, Anatolikon, Thracesion and Armeniakon, and the naval Karabisianoi corps, among the senior administrators of the Empire. He also sought to protect the rights of peasant freeholders (who served as the main recruitment pool for the imperial armies) against attempts by the aristocracy to acquire their land. This put him in direct conflict with some of the largest landholders in the Empire.

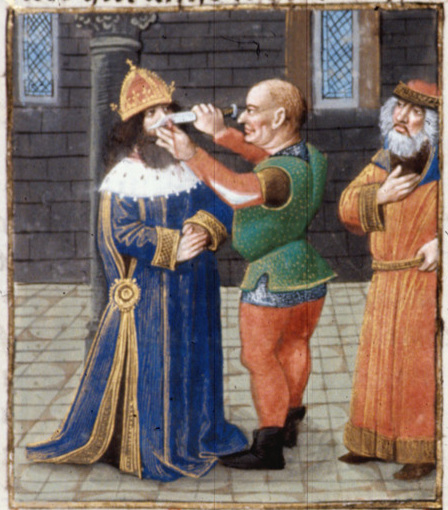
Mutilation of Justinian II on the orders of Leontius in 695, miniature from a 15th century French manuscript.

While his land policies threatened the aristocracy, his tax policy was very unpopular with the common people. Through his agents Stephen and Theodotos, the emperor raised the funds to gratify his sumptuous tastes and his mania for erecting costly buildings. This, plus ongoing religious discontent, conflicts with the aristocracy, and displeasure with his resettlement policy eventually drove his subjects into rebellion. In 695 the population rose under the leadership of Leontius, the strategos of Hellas, and proclaimed Leontius to be emperor. Justinian was deposed and his nose was cut off (later to be replaced by a solid gold replica of his original) to prevent his again seeking the throne: such mutilation was common in Byzantine culture. He was exiled to Cherson in the Crimea. Leontius, after a reign of three years, was in turn dethroned and imprisoned by Tiberius III, who then assumed the throne.

== Exile ==
While in exile, Justinian began to plot and gather supporters for an attempt to retake the throne. Justinian became a liability to Cherson and the authorities decided to return him to Constantinople in 702 or 703. He escaped from Cherson and received help from Busir, the khagan of the Khazars, who received him enthusiastically and gave him his sister as a bride. Justinian renamed her Theodora, after the wife of Justinian I. They were given a home in the town of Phanagoria, at the entrance to the sea of Azov. Busir was offered a bribe by Tiberius to kill his brother-in-law, and dispatched two Khazar officials, Papatzys and Balgitzin, to do the deed. Warned by his wife, Justinian executed Papatzys and Balgitzin. He sailed in a fishing boat to Cherson, summoned his supporters, and they all sailed westwards across the Black Sea.

As the ship bearing Justinian sailed along the northern coast of the Black Sea, he and his crew became caught up in a storm somewhere between the mouths of the Dniester and the Dnieper Rivers. While it was raging, one of his companions reached out to Justinian saying that if he promised God that he would be magnanimous, and not seek revenge on his enemies when he was returned to the throne, they would all be spared. Justinian retorted: "If I spare a single one of them, may God drown me here".

Having survived the storm, Justinian next approached Tervel of Bulgaria. Tervel agreed to provide all the military assistance necessary for Justinian to regain his throne in exchange for financial considerations, the award of a Caesar's crown, and the hand of Justinian's daughter, Anastasia, in marriage. In spring 705, with an army of 15,000 Bulgar and Slav horsemen, Justinian appeared before the walls of Constantinople. For three days, Justinian tried to convince the citizens of Constantinople to open the gates, but to no avail. Unable to take the city by force, he and some companions entered through an unused water conduit under the walls of the city, roused their supporters, and seized control of the city in a midnight coup d'état. On 21 August, Justinian regained the throne, breaking the tradition preventing the mutilated from Imperial rule. After tracking down his predecessors, he had his rivals Leontius and Tiberius brought before him in chains in the Hippodrome. There, before a jeering populace, Justinian, now wearing a golden nasal prosthesis, placed his feet on the necks of Tiberius and Leontius in a symbolic gesture of subjugation before ordering their execution by beheading, followed by many of their partisans, as well as deposing, blinding and exiling Patriarch Callinicus I to Rome.

== Second reign ==
A map of the Byzantine Empire during the 20 Years' Anarchy

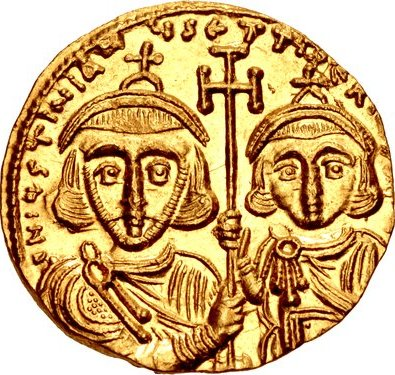
Justinian and his son Tiberius, whom he crowned co-emperor in 706.

Justinian's second reign was marked by unsuccessful warfare against Bulgaria and the Caliphate, and by cruel suppression of opposition at home. In 708 Justinian turned on Bulgarian Khan Tervel, whom he had earlier crowned caesar, and invaded Bulgaria, apparently seeking to recover the territories ceded to Tervel as a reward for his support in 705. The Emperor was defeated, blockaded in Anchialus, and forced to retreat. Peace between Bulgaria and Byzantium was quickly restored. This defeat was followed by Arab victories in Asia Minor, where the cities of Cilicia fell into the hands of the enemy, who penetrated into Cappadocia in 709–711.

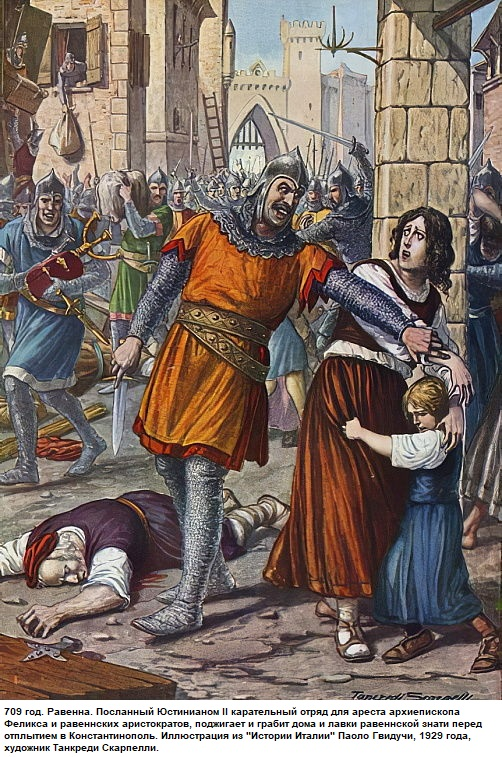
Justinian's II punitive squad robs Ravenna after the arrest of archbishop Felix in 709 as imagined in an artistic depiction from 1929.

He ordered Pope John VII to recognize the decisions of the Quinisext Council and simultaneously fitted out a punitive expedition against Ravenna in 709 under the command of the Patrician Theodore. The expedition was led to reinstate the Western Church's authority over Ravenna, which was taken as a sign of disobedience to the emperor, and revolutionary sentiment. The repression succeeded, and the new Pope Constantine visited Constantinople in 710. Justinian, after receiving Holy Communion at the hands of the pope, renewed all the privileges of the Roman Church. Exactly what passed between them on the subject of the Quinisext Council is not known. It would appear, however, that Constantine approved most of the canons. This would be the last time a Pope visited the city until the visit of Pope Paul VI to Istanbul in 1967.

Justinian's rule provoked another uprising against him. Cherson revolted, and under the leadership of the exiled general Bardanes the city held out against a counter-attack. Soon, the forces sent to suppress the rebellion joined it. The rebels then seized the capital and proclaimed Bardanes as Emperor Philippicus; Justinian had been on his way to Armenia, and was unable to return to Constantinople in time to defend it. He was arrested and executed in November 711, his head being exhibited in Rome and Ravenna.

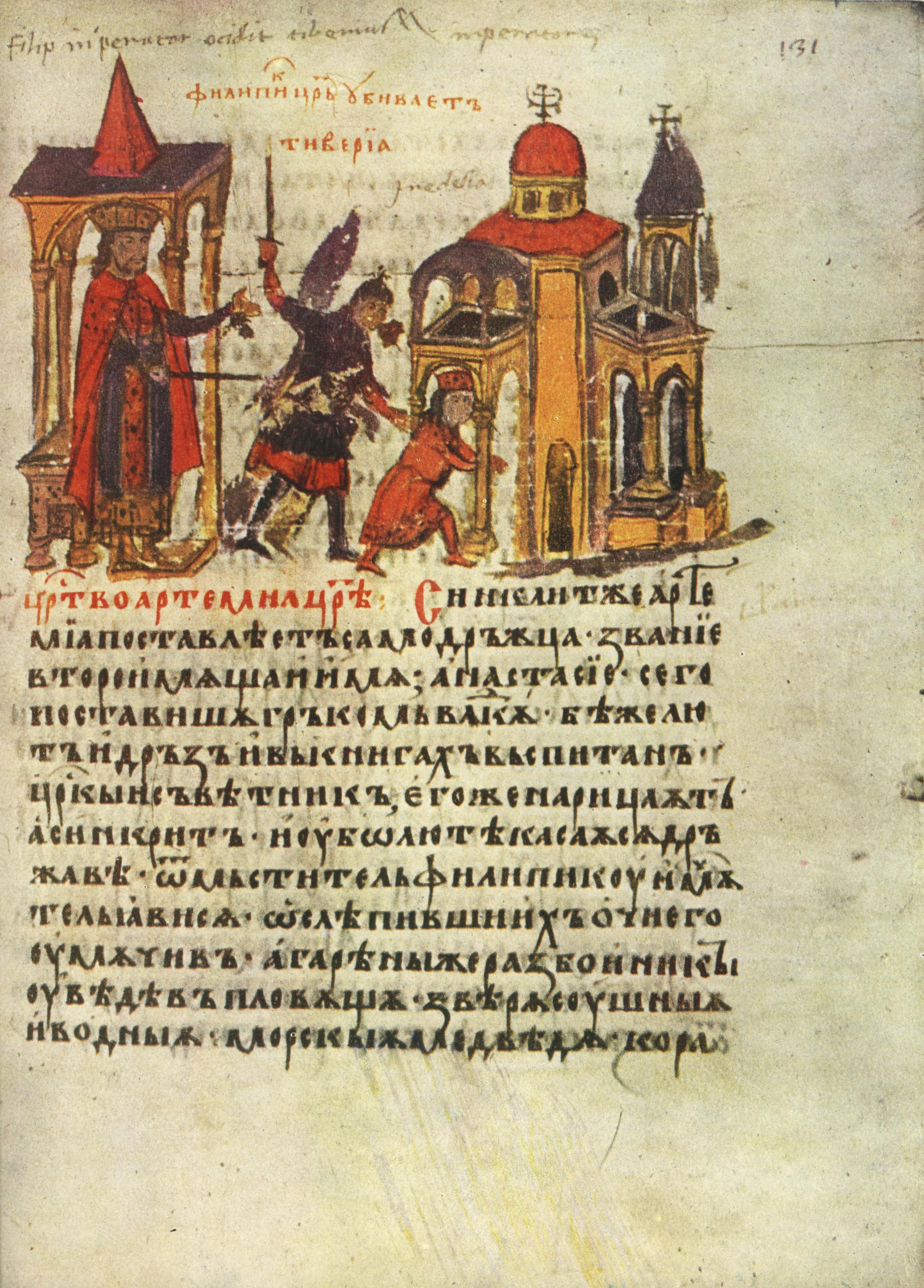
Philippicus sends his men to execute Tiberius. Scene from the 12th century Manasses Chronicle

On hearing the news of his death, Justinian's mother took his six-year-old son and co-emperor, Tiberius, to sanctuary at St. Mary's Church in Blachernae, but was pursued by Philippicus's henchmen, who dragged the child from the altar and, once outside the church, murdered him, thus eradicating the line of Heraclius.

== Legacy ==
Justinian's reign saw the continued slow and ongoing process of transformation of the Byzantine Empire, as the traditions inherited from the ancient Latin Roman state were gradually being eroded. This is most clearly seen in the coinage of Justinian's reign, which saw the reintroduction of the Loros, the traditional consular costume that had not been seen on Imperial coinage for a century, while the office itself had not been celebrated for nearly half a century. This was linked to Justinian's decision to unify the office of consul with that of emperor, thus making the Emperor the head of state not only de facto but also de jure. Although the office of the consulate continued to exist until Emperor Leo VI the Wise formally abolished it with Novel 94, it was Justinian who effectively ended its status as a separate political entity. He was formally appointed as Consul in 686, subsequently adopting the title for all the Julian years of his reign, consecutively numbered.

Though at times undermined by his own despotic tendencies, Justinian was a talented and perceptive ruler who succeeded in improving the standing of the Byzantine Empire. A pious ruler, Justinian was the first emperor to include the image of Christ on coinage issued in his name and attempted to outlaw various pagan festivals and practices that persisted in the Empire. He may have self-consciously modeled himself on his namesake, Justinian I, as seen in his enthusiasm for large-scale construction projects and the renaming of his Khazar wife as Theodora. Among the building projects he undertook was the creation of the triklinos, an extension to the imperial palace, a decorative cascade fountain located at the Augusteum, and a new Church of the Virgin at Petrion.

== Veneration ==
Justinian II
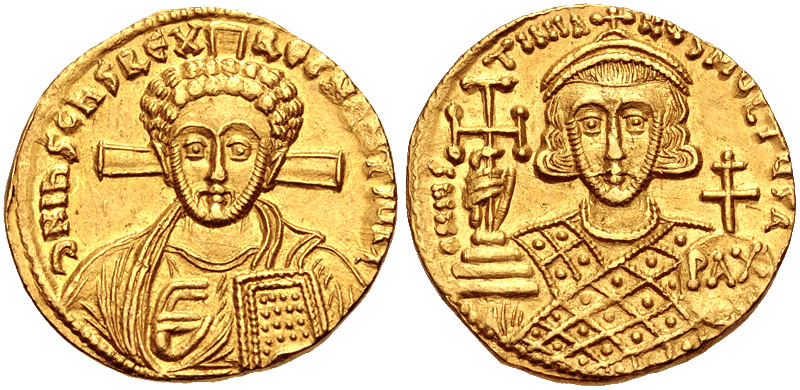
- Justinian II Solidus

Emperor
- Honored in: Eastern Orthodox Church (disputed)
- Feast: 2 August

The veneration of Justinian II in the Orthodox Church is the subject of debate and confusion, as there are discrepancies in different Synaxarions. The Synaxarion of Constantinople from the 10th century lists the commemoration of the "Emperor Justinian", giving no reference of the emperor's life or whether it is Justinian I or II. Supporters of this idea comment that this must be Justinian II, since they affirm that Justinian I died in heresy, a position not held by the Orthodox Church today. Saint Nicodemus the Hagiorite rejects the possibility that Justinian II, a bad man who is not recorded to have died in repentance, can have been made a saint; accordingly he says that the entry in the Synaxarion must refer to Justinian I, who is also celebrated on the 15th of November with his wife Theodora.

Modern English translations and some Greek Synaxarions now list either Justinian I on August 2 or make no reference to either Justinian I or II. However, there are some Greek Synaxarions that list Justinian II.

== Family ==
With his first wife Eudokia, Justinian II had at least one daughter, Anastasia, who was betrothed to the Bulgarian ruler Tervel. With his second wife, Theodora of Khazaria, Justinian II had a son, Tiberius, co-emperor from 706 to 711.

== Fictional account ==
Justinian, a 1998 novel by Byzantine scholar Harry Turtledove, writing under the name H. N. Turteltaub, gives a fictionalized version of Justinian's life as retold by a fictionalized lifelong companion, the soldier Myakes. In the novel, Turtledove speculates that while in exile Justinian had reconstructive surgery done by an itinerant Indian plastic surgeon to repair his damaged nose.

== See also ==
- 7th century in Lebanon § 680s
- List of Byzantine emperors

== Sources ==
=== Primary sources ===
- Theophanes, Chronographia.

=== Secondary sources ===
- Grierson, Philip (1968). Catalogue of the Byzantine Coins in the Dumbarton Oaks Collection. Vol. 2. Dumbarton Oaks. ISBN 9780884020240.
- Kazhdan, Alexander, ed. (1991), "Justinian II", Oxford Dictionary of Byzantium, Oxford University Press, pp. 1084–1085, ISBN 978-0-19-504652-6
- Norwich, John Julius (1990), Byzantium: The Early Centuries, Penguin, ISBN 0-14-011447-5
- Ostrogorsky, George (1956). History of the Byzantine State. Oxford: Basil Blackwell.
- Moore, R. Scott (1998). "Justinian II (685–695 & 705–711 A.D.)". De Imperatoribus Romanis. Archived from the original on 2 December 2010.()
- Bury, J.B. (1889), A History of the Later Roman Empire from Arcadius to Irene, vol. 2, MacMillan & Co
- Vasiliev, A. (1943). "An Edict of the Emperor Justinian II, September, 688". Speculum. 18 (1): 1–13 (5). doi:10.2307/2853636. ISSN 0038-7134. JSTOR 2853636. S2CID 162185288.

Justinian II Heraclian Dynasty Born: 669 Died: November 711
Regnal titles
Preceded by Constantine IV	Byzantine Emperor; 681–695	Succeeded by Leontius
Preceded by Tiberius III	Byzantine Emperor; 705–711 with Tiberius (706–711)	Succeeded by Philippikos
Political offices
Preceded by Constantine IV in 668, then lapsed	Roman consul 686	Succeeded by Lapsed, Tiberius III in 699
