= Phanagoria =

Ancient Greek settlement in Russia

- Φαναγόρεια (Ancient Greek)
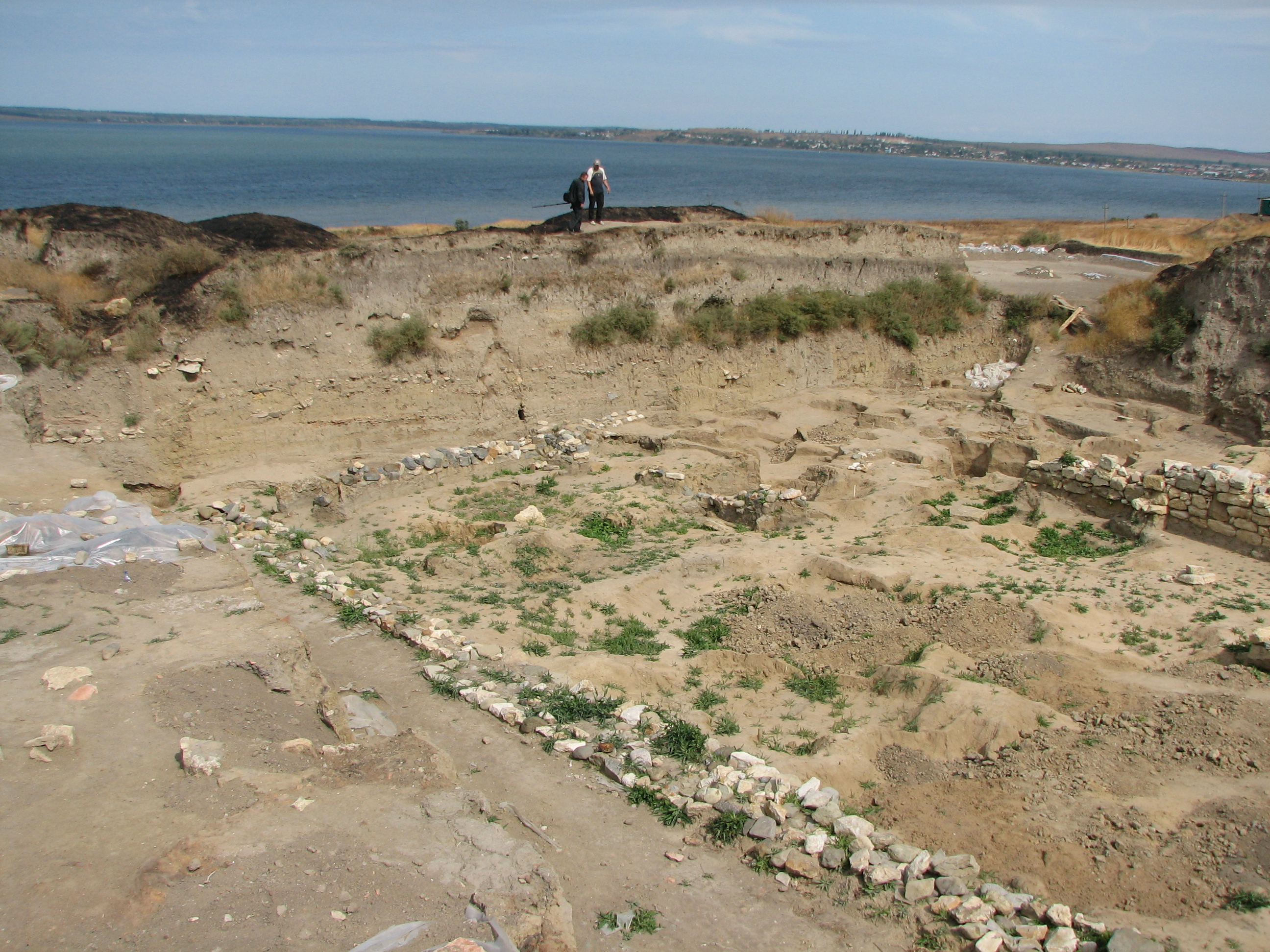
- The remains of Phanagoria

- Location within Krasnodar Krai Location within European Russia
- 45°16′37″N 36°57′58″E
- Type: Settlement
- Periods: Archaic Greek to Medieval
- Cultures: Greek, Bulgar, Khazar
- Location: Sennoy, Krasnodar Krai, Russia
- Region: Taman Peninsula

History
- Built: Approximately 543 BC
- Built by: Settlers from Teos

Site notes
- Area: 75 ha (190 acres)
- Condition: Ruined

A terracotta vessel in the shape of a sphinx, 5th century BC. One of 26 similar pieces discovered in a feminine necropolis ("Demeter's priestess") near Phanagoria. On exhibit at the Hermitage Museum in St. Petersburg.

Phanagoria (Ancient Greek: Φαναγόρεια, romanized: Phanagóreia; Russian: Фанагория, romanized: Fanagoriya) was the largest ancient Greek city on the Taman Peninsula, spread over two plateaus along the eastern shore of the Cimmerian Bosporus.

The city was a large emporium for all the traffic between the coast of the Maeotian marshes and the countries on the southern side of the Caucasus. It was the eastern capital of the Bosporan Kingdom, with Panticapaeum being the western capital. Strabo described it as a noteworthy city which was renowned for its trade. It was briefly a Catholic Metropolitan Archdiocese while a medieval Genoese colony under the name Matrega, it remains a Latin Catholic titular see.

Today the site is located at a short distance to the west of Sennoy in Krasnodar Krai, Russia. Another ancient Greek city, Hermonassa, lies 25 kilometres (16 mi) to the west, on the shoreline of modern Taman.

== History ==
=== Antiquity ===
Phanagoria and other ancient Greek colonies along the north coast of the Black Sea, 8th to 3rd century BC

Phanagoria was founded ca. 543 BC by the Teian colonists who had to flee Asia Minor in consequence of their conflict with the Persian king Cyrus the Great. The city took its name after one of these colonists, Phanagoras. "The unusual nature of the Taman peninsula near Phanagoria, with its ravines, crevices, hills, and low cones of active volcanoes, must have impressed the ancient colonists even more than it impresses us today", historian Yulia Ustinova has observed.

In the 5th century BC, the town thrived on the trade with the Scythians and Sindi. Located on an island in the ancient archipelago of Corocondamitis, between the Black Sea and the Palus Maeotis, Phanagoria covered an area of 75 hectares (190 acres) of which one third has been submerged by the sea. In the early 4th century BC the burgeoning Bosporan Kingdom subjugated much of Sindica, including the independent polis of Phanagoria. The town's importance increased with the decline of the old capital, Panticapaeum, situated on the opposite shore of the Crimean strait, or Cimmerian Bosporus. By the first centuries AD, Phanagoria had emerged as the main centre of the kingdom.

During the Mithridatic Wars, the town allied with the Roman Republic and withstood a siege by the army of Pharnaces II of Pontus. It was at Phanagoria that the insurrection broke out against Mithridates VI of Pontus, shortly before his death; and his sons, who held the citadel, were obliged to surrender to the insurgents. An inscription found during excavations testifies that Queen Dynamis honored Augustus as "the emperor, Caesar, son of a god, the god Augustus, the overseer of every land and sea". The loyalty to Rome allowed Phanagoria to maintain a dominant position in the region until the 4th century, when it was sacked and destroyed by the invading Huns.

=== Middle Ages ===
By the 7th century, the town had recovered from a century of invasions from the steppe peoples. It served as the capital of Old Great Bulgaria between 632 and 665 under Kubrat.

Afterwards Phanagoria became (at least nominally) a Byzantine dependency. A Khazar tudun was nonetheless present in the town and de facto control probably rested in Khazar hands until the defeat of Georgius Tzul in 1016. In 704, the deposed Byzantine emperor Justinian II settled in Phanagoria (then governed by the Khazar tudun Balgatzin) with his wife Theodora, a sister of the Khazar Khagan Busir Glavan, before returning to Constantinople by way of Bulgaria.

In the 10th century, the town seems to have faced an invasion, supposedly by the Rus. After that, Phanagoria could not compete in significance with neighboring Tmutarakan.

In the late Middle Ages the town of Matrega was built on its ruins; the site was part of a network of Genoese possessions along the northern Black Sea coast. During the 15th century, it was the center of de Ghisolfi dominions. Henceforth there has been no permanent settlement on the site.

== Ecclesiastical history ==
The Genoese colony was canonically established on 1349.02.21 as Metropolitan Archdiocese of Matriga. It was suppressed around 1400 AD.

- Recorded incumbent : Giovanni di Zechia, Friars Minor (O.F.M.) (1349.02.22 – 1363?)

=== Titular see ===
The diocese was nominally restored as a Latin Catholic titular bishopric in 1928 under the name Matriga, which was changed in 1929 already to Matrega.

It is vacant, having had the following incumbents, all of the lowest (episcopal) rank :

- Titular Bishop Teofilius Matulionis (1928.12.08 – 1943.01.09), as Auxiliary Bishop of Mohilev (Belarus) (1928.12.08 – 1943.01.09); later Bishop of Kaišiadorys (Lithuania) (1943.01.09 – 1962.08.20) and on emeritate created Archbishop ad personam (1962.02.09 – death 1962.08.20)
- Titular Bishop Rafael González Estrada (1944.05.16 – death 1994.03.07), first as Auxiliary Bishop of Quetzaltenango, Los Altos (Guatemala) (1944.05.16 – 1955), then Auxiliary Bishop of Guatemala (Guatemala) (1955 – emeritate 1984.05.29).

== Excavations ==
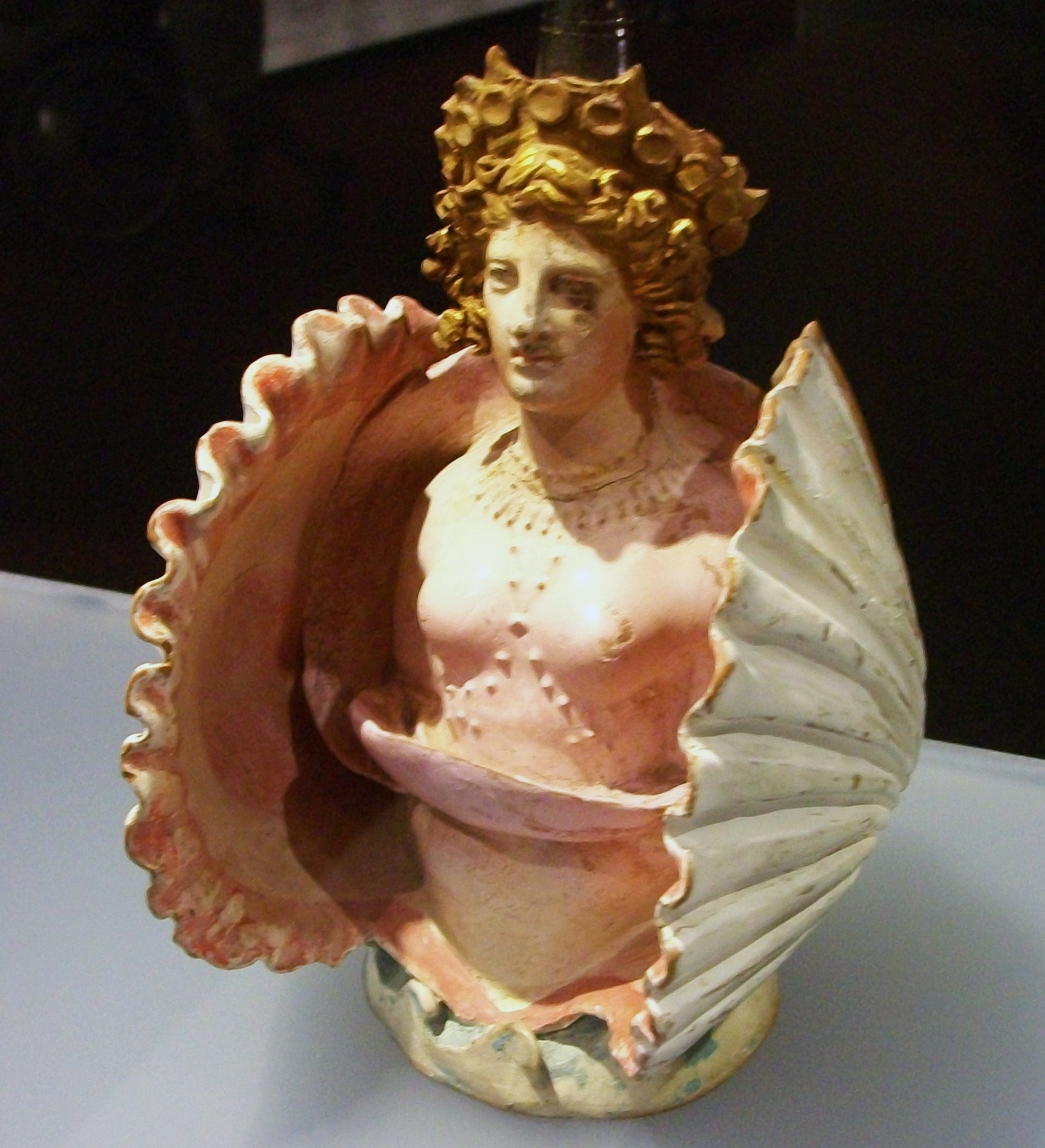
Pottery vessel in the shape of Aphrodite inside a shell; from Attica, Classical Greece, discovered in the Phanagoria cemetery, Taman Peninsula (Bosporan Kingdom, southern Russia), 1st quarter of 4th century BC, Hermitage Museum, Saint Petersburg.

The location of Phanagoria was identified in the 18th century, when marble statue bases with dedications to Aphrodite were discovered there. Hecataeus and Strabo mention a local sanctuary of Aphrodite as the largest in the Pontic region. Archaeological exploration of the site started in 1822, when "soldiers dug into a large barrow, making rich discoveries of gold and silver objects, many unique, which they divided up between themselves".

Apart from the ancient city itself, archaeologists have been interested in a vast necropolis, which spreads on three sides around Phanagoria. There are thousands of burials, many with cypress or marble sarcophagi — an indication of the well-being of the ancient Phanagorians. Excavations conducted in the 19th century were, for the most part, amateurish; as many as twelve kurgans would be razed each season. Some of the most intriguing finds were unearthed in the 1860s at the Bolshaya Bliznitsa tumulus, classed by Michael Rostovtzeff as a feminine necropolis with three vaults.

One of the royal kurgans near Phanagoria "has a stone stairway leading down to a rectangular passageway, the entrance to the burial chamber (3.70 × 3.75 × 4.70 m). These two areas are covered by an arch showing remains of painted decoration. The wall frescos imitate encrusted marble. On either side of the entrance to the tomb, long stone boxes contain four horse burials along with rich grave gifts; saddlery and harnesses of gold and gilded bronze." Vladimir Blavatsky resumed excavations of Phanagoria in 1936. Among the recent finds is an inscription indicating that a synagogue existed in Phanagoria as early as 51 AD. Underwater investigation of the site has revealed multiple fragments of architectural structures.

In 2009 was discovered the palace of Mithridates VI.

In 2021, archaeologists discovered coins in the broken neck of an amphora. They are thought to have been minted in the late 3rd or early 4th century and circulated through the 6th century. The coins are thought to have been hidden before an attack by the Huns or the Turks, who burned and destroyed large parts of the city. Most probably, an early Christian basilica stood on the site where the coins were found.

=== Jewish synagogue and quarter ===
In 2023, archaeologists announced "the discovery of one of the world’s oldest synagogues and, according to analysis of fragments found at the site, it likely stood for over half a millennium after being constructed around the beginning of the first century BCE." The remains of the Second Temple-era synagogue included "several menorahs, altars, and marble stele fragments," making it one of the earliest, if not the earliest synagogue ever uncovered outside of Israel. Over the past year, archaeologists have concluded that the synagogue was part of a Jewish quarter located in an area intersected by major streets and surrounded by residential homes and structures such as a vineyard, a garden, and a water network. Other discoveries include tombstones bearing symbols like menorahs and shofars, and an amphora featuring a Hebrew inscription.

There is also epigraphic evidence for a Jewish community. A manumission text, dated to 52 CE, records the consecration of freed slaves to the proseuche (synagogue), with the local Jewish community acting as their legal guardian. This pattern is also documented in several inscriptions from Panticapaeum in the Crimean Peninsula.

== Honours ==
Phanagoria Island in Antarctica is named after Phanagoria.

== Notable people ==
- Sosicrates (Ancient Greek: Σωσικράτης) of Phanagoria, ancient Greek poet.
- Castor (Ancient Greek: Κάστωρ) of Phanagoria, the leader of the city revolt against the King Pharnaces II of Pontus.

== See also ==
- List of ancient Greek cities
- Colonies in antiquity
