= Agnellus =

Agnellus is a proper name of Latin origin. It may refer to:

- Agnellus of Ravenna (commentator)
- Agnellus (bishop of Telese) (5th century)
- Agnellus (bishop of Aosta) (died 528)
- Agnellus (bishop of Trent) (6th century)
- Agnellus (bishop of Ravenna) (487–570)
- Agnellus of Naples, bishop of Naples from 673 to c. 694
- Agnellus (bishop of Sutri) (fl. 721)
- Agnellus Particiacus, doge of Venice (r. 811–827)
- Agnellus II Particiacus (died 820), grandson and co-doge of the preceding
- Andreas Agnellus (c. 805–c. 846), historian of Ravenna
- Agnellus of Pisa (1195–1236), English Franciscan
- Agnellus, martyred in 1227 at Ceuta with Daniel and Companions
