= Anastasia (wife of Constantine IV) =

Byzantine empress from 668 to 685

- Augusta

Empress of the Byzantine Empire
- Tenure: 668–685
- Born: c. 650
- Died: after 711; Constantinople (now Istanbul, Turkey)
- Burial: Church of the Holy Apostles
- Spouse: Constantine IV
- Issue: Justinian II; Heraclius
- Dynasty: Heraclian

Anastasia (Greek: Ἀναστασία, romanized: Anastasía, c. 650 – after 711) was the empress consort of Constantine IV of the Byzantine Empire.

== Empress ==
Anastasia entered historical record when her husband Constantine IV succeeded to the throne in 668, following his father's death. On September 15, 668, her father-in-law Constans II was assassinated in his bath by his chamberlain. He resided for the last few years of his reign in Syracuse, while Constantine and Anastasia remained in Constantinople.

Anastasia became the senior Empress consort when news of the assassination reached the court. The birth of her first son, Justinian II, can be estimated to 668/669 due to the chronologies of Theophanes the Confessor and Ecumenical Patriarch Nikephoros I of Constantinople. A reference in De Administrando Imperio by Constantine VII, places the birth in Cyprus.

Her only other son mentioned is named as Heraclius in the Liber Pontificalis. The entry on Pope Benedict II (term 26 June 684 – 8 May 685), mentions the Pope receiving locks of hair from both Justinian and Heraclius, presumably as a gesture of goodwill by their father.

Constantine IV died of dysentery in September, 685. Anastasia is known to have survived him by more than two decades.

== Later life ==
Justinian succeeded to the throne and would go on to earn a reputation for excessive harshness. Justinian needed funds for his building projects and allowed Stephen the Persian, his logothetes tou genikou (responsible for the taxation of the state), to secure them by any means. Both Theophanes and Nikephoros claimed that Stephen inflicted corporal punishment or plain torture while trying to collect the needed funds.

Theophanes records an incident in 693/694, where Anastasia was subject to flagellation under the orders of Stephen. Justinian was absent at the time. The incident might indicate lasting hostility between the mother of the emperor and his favourite.

The increased taxation and the methods used in collecting made Justinian increasingly unpopular with the people. He was deposed in a coup d'état under Leontius in 695. The whereabouts and status of Anastasia during the short reigns of Leontius (695–698) and Tiberius III (698–705) are unknown. Her son reclaimed the throne in 705 and would rule until 711.

Justinian died while facing a revolt under strategos Bardanes, renamed Philippicus. Justinian was captured and swiftly executed outside the gates of Constantinople. Anastasia resurfaces trying to protect the life of her six-year-old grandson, Tiberius. She took the boy to sanctuary at St. Mary's Church in Blachernae. However, they were pursued by Philippicus' henchmen. Anastasia was still pleading for his life while the boy was forcibly removed from the altar. He was executed despite her protests.

How long she survived her son and grandson is unknown. She was mentioned by Leo Grammaticus to have been buried in the Church of the Holy Apostles alongside her husband.

== Sources ==
- Theophanes the Confessor, Chronicle
- Ecumenical Patriarch Nikephoros I of Constantinople, Chronographikon syntomon
- Joannes Zonaras, Extracts of History.

Royal titles
Preceded by Fausta	Byzantine Empress consort 668–685	Succeeded by Eudokia
