= Tudun =

Ancient Göktürk government position

A tudun was a Gokturk title meaning governor resident in a town or other settlement used in Khazar, Bulgar, and Avar empires. The tudun was the personal representative of the imperial government and could function both as an administrator and a diplomat. At times, a tudun would be appointed for a town nominally under another power's control but de facto within the sphere of influence of the tudun's khagan.

The title fell below Salīfān in the Turkic hierarchy.
