= Plato (exarch) =

Byzantine exarch of Ravenna

Plato (Greek: Πλάτων, romanized: Plátōn; fl. 645–653) was the Exarch of Ravenna from 645 to 649. He is known primarily for his monothelitism, as well as for his opposition to Pope Theodore I, whom he convinced Patriarch Paul II of Constantinople to break with.

He is first attested as exarch in 645. By 649, when his successor Olympius is named as being at Ravenna, he was already back at the imperial court in Constantinople, functioning as the advisor of Emperor Constans II on the Italian situation regarding Pope Martin I's resistance to Monotheletism.

He is last attested in 653. A brother, the presbyter Theocharistus, and a brother-in-law or son-in-law named Theodore Chilas, are also attested two years later.

== Sources ==
- Winkelmann, Friedhelm; Lilie, Ralph-Johannes; et al. (2001). "Platon (#6266)". Prosopographie der mittelbyzantinischen Zeit: I. Abteilung (641–867), 4. Band: Platon (#6266) – Theophylaktos (#8345) (in German). Walter de Gruyter. p. 1. ISBN 3-11-016674-7.

Preceded by Theodore I Calliopas	Exarch of Ravenna c. 645–649	Succeeded by Olympius
