= Boniface Consiliarius =

Bonifatius Consiliarius (died circa 705) (also known as Boniface Consiliarius and Archdeacon Boniface) resided in Rome where he was an advisor to the papacy for approximately 50 years. He held the roles of consiliarius or archdeacon. He is known for his work as a translator, although only part of the Miracula Cyri et Johannis survives today.

== Career ==
While there is no record of a birth date for Bonifatius, it is believed that he died in 705 AD. Since he worked under the papacy for a long period, it is likely that he was born in Rome. Bonifatius served as consiliarius from the papacy of Martin I until that of John VII.

Bonifatius was sent by Pope Benedict II to see Macarius of Antioch in 684 or 685 after the sixth ecumenical council had anathematized (or excommunicated) Macarius for his belief in monothelitism. Most likely, Bonifatius was sent to see Macarius to try and convert him and he would have been the ideal candidate to do so because of his vast knowledge of both theology and Greek. He was later sent by Pope Sergius as a representative to the Quinisext Council in 692.

He was also well noted in historical documents as the teacher and friend of the English bishop, Wilfrid of Ripon. These mentioned that in c. 653 a young Wilfrid learned in Rome of "Paschal calculation, with which the schismatics of which Britain and Ireland were not acquainted with" as well as other ecclesiastical disciplines including how to understand the Gospels. Bede adds that Wilfrid could not have learned these things in his own country. There are also records of Wilfrid returning to Rome in 679-80 and in 704, when he may have sought assistance from Bonifatius.

== Miracula translation ==
Bonifatius was also known as a translator, in addition to serving in the role of consiliarius. He translated the first twelve chapters of the Miracula Cyri et Johannis (known in English as the Seventy Miracles of SS. Cyrus and John) from Greek into Latin. The original was written by Sophronius of Jerusalem. This document detailed the miracles of Saints Cyrus and John. Anastasius Bibliotecarius noted this when he went to write his famous translations of the same work ("Bonifatius consiliarius… duodecim cum praefatione capitula olim interpretatus est") referencing that a Bonifatius Consiliarius had already translated the first twelve chapters of this piece into Latin. Based on when these translations were completed, it appears that this is the same Bonifatius that was associated with Wilfrid and the sixth ecumenical council. It is believed that Anastasius would have used Bonifatius’ translations to assist him in completion of his translations of the Miracula in the ninth century. Bonifatius’ translations would most likely have been completed during the papacy of Leo II or Benedict II, Leo known for being bilingual and wanting to have such documents like the Miracula translated from Greek to Latin.

Richard Pollard has argued that "by examining Bonifatius’s Latin prose style and vocabulary in minute detail, and comparing these to existing papal documents… papal officials with similarly high levels of rhetorical, theological and legal training may have been more numerous than previously supposed."

== See also ==
- Hagiography
- List of translators
