= Lateran Council of 649 =

Christian synod

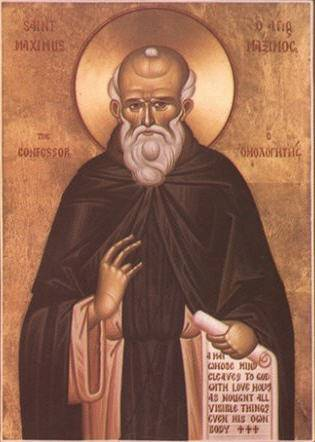
Maximus the Confessor, the author of the council's canons

The Lateran Council of 649 was a synod held in the Basilica of St. John Lateran to condemn Monothelitism, a Christology espoused by many Eastern Christians, and (to some degree) Pope Honorius. The Council did not achieve ecumenical status in either East or West, but represented the first attempt of a pope to convene an ecumenical council independent of the Roman emperor.

According to Andrew Ekonomou, the irony of the council was that the denunciation of the theology of Constantinople came from the "collaboration of a Greco-Palestinian pope and a Constantinopolitan monk employing a style of theological discourse whose tradition was purely Eastern." Although Pope Martin I and Maximus the Confessor were abducted by Constans II and tried in Constantinople for their role in the council (Martin I being replaced as pope before dying in exile), their position was ultimately endorsed by the Third Council of Constantinople in 680.

== Planning ==
Most members of the contemporary Roman clergy would have been too uneducated in theology to "grasp even the fundamental issues presented in the Monothelite controversy" due to centuries of decay in both religious and secular learning in the city. However, Rome had been the beneficiary of a brain drain of the Eastern empire, as Greek monks like Maximus the Confessor fled from Africa and the Middle East to Rome. Although the position of the council was substantially similar to that espoused by the Council of Chalcedon, "for the first time in well over a century, the church of Rome would be in a position to debate theological issues with Byzantium from a position of equality in both intellectual substance and rhetorical form."

The synod has its roots in a series of correspondence between Pope Theodore I and Maximus dating to 646, before the latter's arrival in Rome. The momentum for the council was almost extinguished when Patriarch Pyrrhus of Constantinople in late 646/early 647 denounced Monothelitism before the Roman clergy and laity. However, Pyrrhus changed his mind upon leaving Rome and arriving in Ravenna, and his successor Paul II of Constantinople was of the same mind.

Emperor Constans II issued the Typos in 648 which prohibited any discussion of the issue of "one will and one energy, or two energies and two wills" in Christ. The Typos was viewed as an unacceptable threat to the legacy of Chalcedon, and thus hardened the determination of Theodore and Maximus to convene a council. Maximus and other monks from his order did all the "planning, preparation, and scripting" of the council. In contrast, there is little evidence that Pope Theodore did much to prepare for the council.

=== Ecumenical status ===
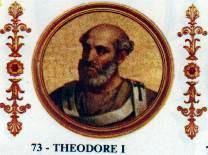
Pope Theodore I

Maximus and Theodore did not regard the council as merely a meeting of the Roman church, but rather one "in the nature of a general or ecumenical council." In a letter to a Cypriot priest, Maximus referred to the council as the "sixth synod, which through the divine inspiration of God set forth with all pure piety the doctrines of the holy Fathers."

Never before had the pope—or any prominent Christian leader—challenged the authority of the Roman emperor alone to convene an ecumenical council. Even Athanasius, the virulent opponent of Constantius II's Arianism, had conceded this to the emperor he regarded as a heretic. The papacy also had long regarded ecumenical councils as the prerogative of the emperor; for example, when Pope Julius I convened a synod to rehabilitate Athanasius (condemned by the First Synod of Tyre), he defended the practice by claiming the synod was not meant to be general or ecumenical. Although the Council planned to send its canons to Constans II for ratification, there was little doubt that this would be viewed as "form without substance." Theodore and Maximus were undoubtedly aware that they were "claiming nothing less than a revolutionary role for the Papacy."

Later popes would de facto repudiate this usurpation by allowing the emperor to convene the Third Council of Constantinople (680). Nevertheless, the Lateran Council of 649 constituted a watershed moment in the history of the primacy of the Roman pontiff. In an attempt to legitimize the council, neither Maximus nor Theodore attempted to innovate further with its methodology.

=== Death of Theodore ===
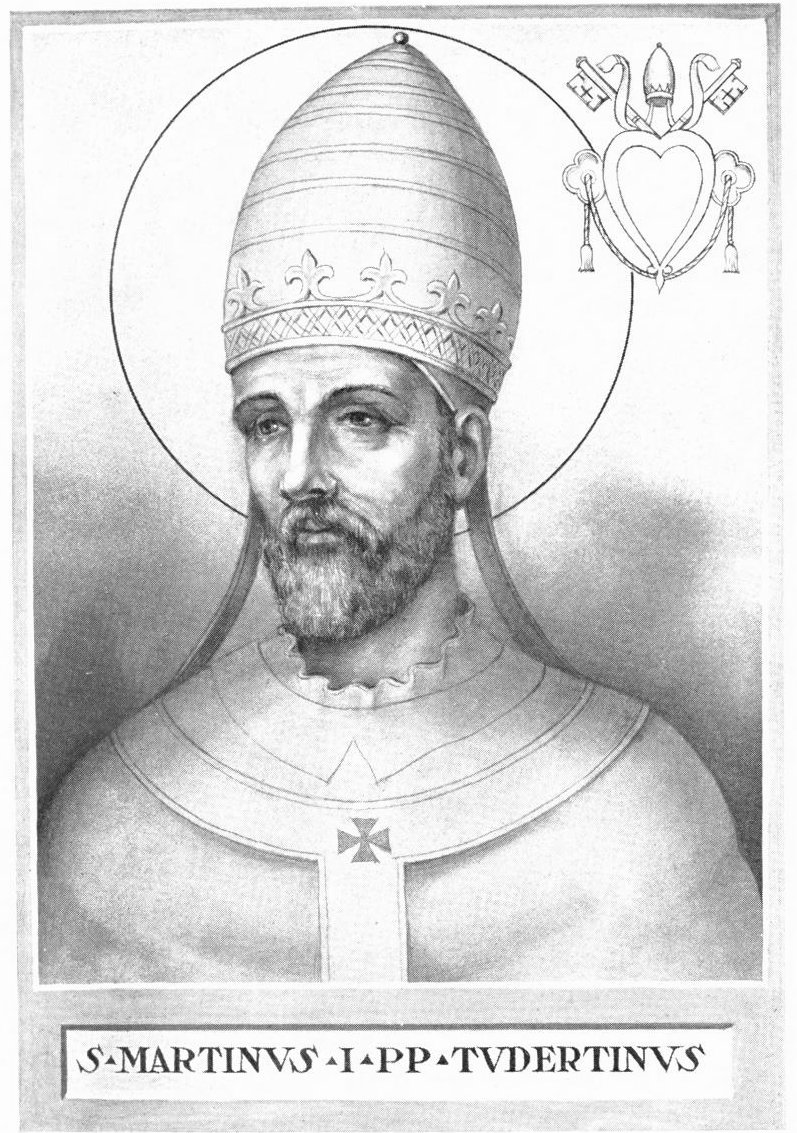
Pope Martin I, the first pope since 537 consecrated without imperial approval

Pope Theodore died on 14 May 649 while preparing for the council. His death left Maximus without his patron and collaborator of the last three years and the "Papacy vacant at one of the most crucial times in the church's history." The Roman clergy was faced with the impossible dilemma of finding a successor with the intellectual reputation to convene the Council who would not be denied the iussio of the emperor required for consecration.

Due to the influence of Maximus, on 5 July 649, a deacon from Todi was consecrated as Pope Martin I, the first (and only) pope consecrated without imperial approval during the Byzantine Papacy. Although he was the former apocrisiarius to Constantinople and well respected in the East, Martin's election was an indisputable "battle cry against Constantinople." Martin's stature and proficiency in Greek are attested to by Theodore's offer to appoint Martin as his personal representative to an earlier proposed synod in Constantinople.

News of the impending council reached Constantinople as Martin prepared for it during the summer and fall, but the empire was "far too occupied with crises in the East to divert its attention." Far from being spontaneous or extemporaneous, the council had been meticulously prepared and rehearsed over the previous three years. Despite Martin's nominal role in presiding over the council, none of its participants were ignorant of the decisive influence of Maximus in bringing it about. According to Ekonomou, the council was "in form as well as substance, a manifestly Byzantine affair."

== Attendance ==
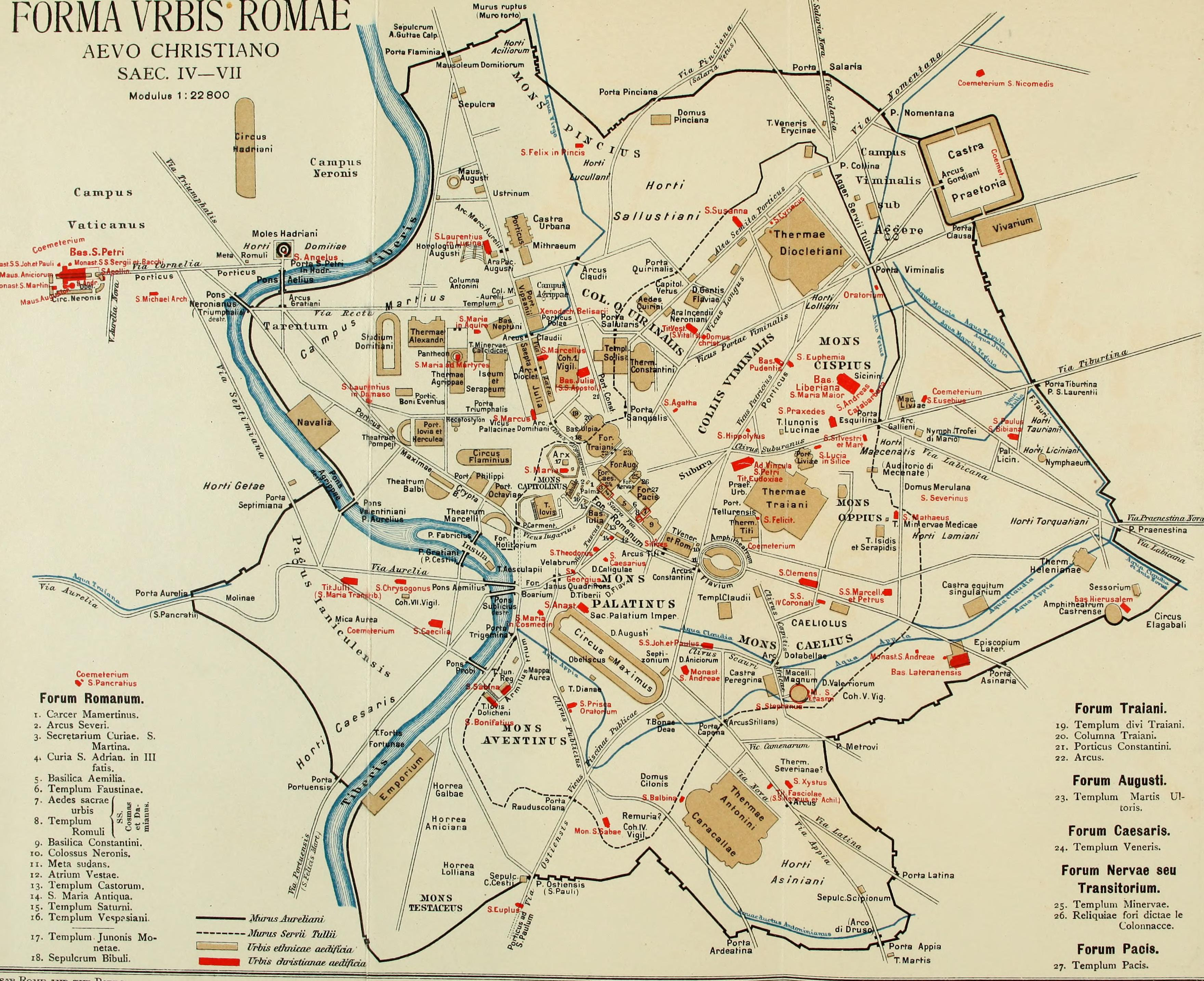
Map of medieval Rome: Lateran Basilica circled.

The council was attended by 105 bishops, all but one from the western portion of the Byzantine Empire. Stephen of Dor, a Palestinian, was the only bishop whose See was not in Italy, Sicily, Sardinia, Corsica, or Africa. Transalpine Europe, Spain, Greece, and Crete—despite lying within the ecclesiastical jurisdiction of Rome—were not represented. One-fourth of the bishops were (as indicated by their names) likely of Eastern ethnicity or origin and thus probably Greek-speaking.

The most prominent speaking roles were taken by (in descending order): Pope Martin I, Bishop Maximos of Aquileia, Bishop Deusdedit of Cagliari in Sardinia, Bishop Maurus of Cesena (in lieu of the archbishop of Ravenna), Sergius of Tempsa, Benedict of Ajaccio from Corsica, and Leontios of Naples (probably Leontios of Neapolis). With the exception of Leontios, these were also the highest-ranking bishops present. The other ninety-eight bishops were essentially spectators, speaking (allegedly) in unison only five times, present only to bolster the council's claim to ecumenical status. Most of these were not well-educated enough to understand the complexities of the Monothelite controversy, with many knowing only that Monothelitism diverged from the Council of Chalcedon.

== Proceedings ==
=== First session ===
The council was convoked on 5 October 649 by the Greek cleric Theophylaktos, the principal notary of the Apostolic See, chief of the papal chancery and library, invoking the regnal year of the "august and most pious lord Constantine." Pope Martin I then read a pre-prepared speech criticizing Monothelitism (a view held by the Patriarchs of Constantinople and Alexandria), denouncing the Ekthesis and Typos of Constans, and claiming for Rome the apostolic authority to weed out heresy. Martin quoted five Greek authors and two texts by Pope Leo I. The bishops of Aquileia and Cagliari spoke next, with remarks in much the same fashion, followed by representatives of the archbishop of Ravenna (himself absent).

The entire convocation together assented to the previous remarks and recessed for two days.

=== Second session ===
The second session was convened on 8 October by Theophylaktos, who acknowledged the presence of late arrival Stephen of Dor, the papal vicar in Palestine, deputized to depose the Monothelite clergy of Sergius of Joppa. Bishop Stephen had arrived to deliver his own tract against Monothelitism, which was translated from Greek to Latin by papal notary Anastasios. The pope endorsed the speech upon its completion.

A delegation of Greek abbots, priests, and monks (many of whom had been resident in Rome for years) were then admitted to the synod by Theophylaktos to present their own tract denouncing Monothelitism. As the bishop of Aquileia insisted, Theodoros translated these remarks into Latin. The tract was signed by thirty-six monks, among them Maximus the Confessor. The presence of these Easterners was designed to bolster the claim to ecumenical status of the council, anticipating that Constantinople would decry it as a regional assembly.

=== Third session ===
The third session took place on 17 October and consisted of Pope Martin responding to eleven excerpts of pro-Monothelite arguments by Theodore of Pharan's letter to Sergius of Arsinoe, and the citing of Eastern patristic sources in response. Martin appealed to a text of Cyril of Alexandria to rebut the arguments of Cyrus of Alexandria and Sergius I of Constantinople.

=== Fourth session ===
On 19 October the synod referenced the two letters of Gregory Nazianzen and a text by Anastasius Sinaita.

=== Fifth session ===
The last session of the Council took place on 31 October, relying on florilegia from various Greek theologians. An excerpt from the Fifth Ecumenical Council on how to determine appropriate authority of texts was read at the suggestion of Leontios of Naples. Excerpts from fifty-eight texts by twenty-one authors (sixteen Greek and five Latin) were then read. After more texts were read, the Council proclaimed its adherence to the five previous ecumenical councils and condemned all those who disagreed.

Altogether, 161 texts were quoted to the fifth session, 27 from Maximus's Tomus Spiritualis, with the vast majority originating in the East.

== Canons ==
The council's acts and decrees were disseminated along with a papal encyclical claiming the "faith of the universal church" by virtue of having "exercised the collective power of the episcopate." Of course, as Martin and Maximus were aware, all the previous councils regarded as ecumenical were convened by the emperor, not the pope. This encyclical itself was likely written by Maximus.

Until recently, the predominant historical view was that the acts and proceedings of the council were written in Latin and then translated into Greek; Riedinger's more recent analysis of the texts suggests the opposite to be true. None of the council's prime movers were native Latin speakers, in particular Maximus the Confessor.

The council's formal pronouncements amounted to 20 canons. Canons X and XI are the ones which specifically take up the subject of Christ's two wills and two energies, based predominately on Maximus's earlier disputation against Pyrrhus while in Carthage.

The council's canons were promulgated widely in Western Europe, being sent to: bishop Amandus of Maastricht (to arrange for Sigebert III to convene a Frankish synod), bishop John of Philadelphia, bishop Theodore of Esbas in Arabia, bishop Anthony of Bacatha, archimandrite George of St. Theodosios's monastery, bishop Pantaleon of Dor, bishop Paul of Thessalonica, and the Christian communities of Jerusalem and Antioch.

== Aftermath ==
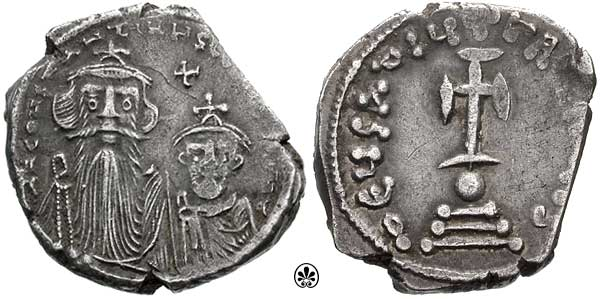
A coin of Constans II, who had Pope Martin I and Maximus the Confessor abducted and tried in Constantinople

The Roman public, independent of their distaste for Monothelitism, harbored a "growing resentment toward Byzantine political domination," as expressed by the recent revolt of Mauricius against Isaac, Exarch of Ravenna. Two years later, Theodore I took the "bold and unprecedented act of presuming to depose" Patriarch Paul II of Constantinople, one of the leading proponents of Monothelitism. Neither Theodore nor the Roman public desired political independence from Constantinople, but Theodore calculated that "the time was now particularly propitious to press Rome's position against Constantinople on the Monothelite question with even greater vigor."

Theodore did not believe his own authority ex cathedra nor his attempted deposition of the Patriarch to be sufficient to defeat Monothelitism; rather he hoped that the strength of the argument of the Council itself would win the day.

=== Trial in Constantinople ===
Within four years of the closing of the council, Pope Martin I and Maximus the Confessor were arrested and brought to Constantinople for trial, for violating the Typos's prohibition on discussing the subject.

During his first trial in June 654 Maximus was asked by sakellarios Troilus where he had condemned the Typos. He replied "at the synod of Rome in the Church of the Savior." Demosthenes exclaimed in reply that the Roman pontiff had been deposed. Maximus responded that the validity of the argument of the Council did not depend on the legitimacy of the pontiff that convened it.

Martin I was exiled, eventually arriving in Tauric Chersonese in May 655. In an unusual move, a successor to Martin I, Pope Eugene I, was elected in 654 while he still lived and his name retained its anathema, escaping mention by even any of his successors for 75 years. Pope Eugene I normalized relations with Constantinople, and although he avoided pressing the issues of the Christological controversy, he ceremonially refused a letter from the Patriarch of Constantinople.

== Text ==
Concilium Lateranense a. 649 celebratum, ed. Rudolf Riedinger (Berlin, 1984). Includes both Greek and Latin texts.

The Acts of the Lateran Synod of 649. Translated with commentary by Richard Price and contributions by Phil Booth and Catherine Cubitt, Translated Texts for Historians 61, Liverpool 2014.
