= Third Council of Constantinople =

680s council of the Christian churches

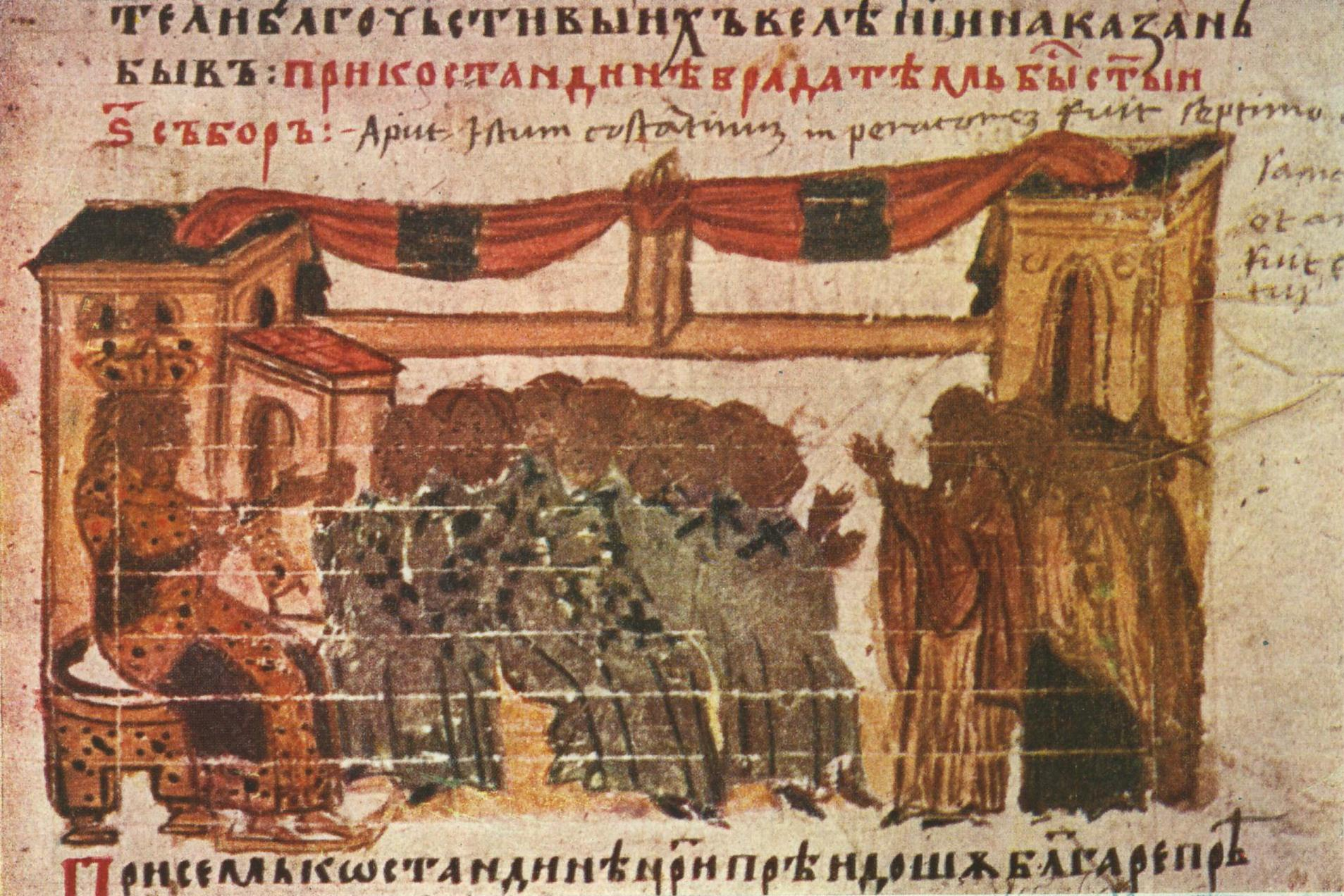
- Depiction of the Third Council of Constantinople, Miniature 45 from the Constantine Manasses Chronicle
- Date: 680–681
- Accepted by: Catholic Church; Eastern Orthodox Church; Old Catholic Church; Anglican churches; Lutheran churches
- Previous council: Second Council of Constantinople
- Next council: Second Council of Nicaea (Catholic Church); Quinisext Council (Eastern Orthodox)
- Convoked by: Emperor Constantine IV
- President: Patriarch George I of Constantinople
- Attendance: About 300; signatories to the documents ranged from 43 (first session) to 174 (last session)
- Topics: Monothelitism, the human and divine wills of Jesus
- Documents and statements: Condemnation of Monothelitism

The Third Council of Constantinople, counted as the Sixth Ecumenical Council by the Eastern Orthodox and Catholic Churches, and by certain other Western Churches, met in 680–681 and condemned monoenergism and monothelitism as heretical and defined Jesus Christ as having two energies and two wills (divine and human).

== Background ==
The council settled a set of theological controversies that went back to the sixth century but had intensified under the emperors Heraclius (r. 610–641) and Constans II (r. 641–668). Heraclius had set out to recover much of the part of his empire lost to the Persians and had attempted to bridge the controversy with monophysitism, which was particularly strong in Syria and Egypt, by proposing a moderate theological position that had as good support in the tradition as any other. The result was first monoenergism, i.e., that Christ, though existing in two natures (divine and human), had one energy; the second was monothelitism, i.e., that Christ had one will (that is, that there was no opposition in Christ between his human and divine volition). This doctrine was accepted in most of the Byzantine world. Still, it was opposed in Jerusalem and Rome and started a controversy that persisted even after the loss of the reconquered provinces and the death of Heraclius. When Heraclius' grandson Constans II took the throne, he saw the controversy as threatening the stability of the Empire and attempted to silence discussion by outlawing speaking either in favor or against the doctrine. Pope Martin I and the monk Maximus, the foremost opponents of monothelitism (which they interpreted as denying a human faculty of will to Christ), held a synod in Rome in 649 that condemned monoenergism and monothelitism. At Constantinople in around 653, some accused the Pope of supporting revolution; this was regarded as high treason, and Martin was accordingly arrested, tried, condemned and sent into exile, where he soon died. Martin and Maximus's position was supported by others at the Council of Constantinople.

== Preparations ==
After Constans' son and successor Constantine IV had overcome the Muslim siege of Constantinople in 678, he immediately set his sights on restoring communion with Rome: he wrote to Pope Donus suggesting a conference on the matter. When the letter reached Rome, Donus had died. Still, his successor, Pope Agatho, agreed to the Emperor's suggestion and ordered councils held throughout the West so that legates could present the tradition of the Western Church. There was a synod in Milan under Archbishop Mausuetus; another synod was held in 680 at Hatfield, over which Theodore, Archbishop of Canterbury presided. Pope Agatho then convened a synod at Rome at Easter 680, with representatives from the regional synods.

Then he sent a delegation to meet the Easterners at Constantinople. The delegates set out bearing two letters, one from Pope Agatho to the Emperor and the other from the bishops of the Rome synod to those gathered in Constantinople.

In the meantime, Constantine summoned Patriarch George I of Constantinople and all bishops of his jurisdiction of Constantinople to a council. He also summoned Patriarch Macarius of Antioch, a Byzantine appointee permanently resident in Constantinople because of the Muslim occupation of his see.

== Proceedings ==
On 7 November 680, a mere 37 bishops and several presbyters convened in a domed hall called the Trullus in the imperial palace. The patriarchs of Constantinople and Antioch participated in person. In contrast, the patriarchates of Alexandria and Jerusalem were represented by Byzantine appointees (because of the Saracen Muslim conquest, there was, at this date, no patriarch in either of these sees). The Pope and a council he had held in Rome were represented (as was customary at eastern ecumenical councils) by a few priests and bishops. In its opening session, the council assumed the authority of an ecumenical council. The emperor attended and presided over the first eleven sessions, participated in the discussions, and returned for the closing session on 16 September 681, attended by 151 bishops.

During the council, a letter by Pope Agatho was read, which asserted the traditional belief of the Church that Christ was of two wills, divine and human. Most of the bishops present accepted the letter, proclaiming that Peter spoke through Agatho, though this council also proclaimed another historical pope as anathema. Macarius of Antioch defended monothelitism but was condemned and deposed, along with his partisans. The council, in keeping with Agatho's letter, defined that Jesus Christ possessed two energies and two wills but that the human will was 'in subjection to his divine and all-powerful will'. The council carefully avoided any mention of Maximus the Confessor, who was still regarded with suspicion. It condemned both monoenergism and monothelitism as heretical and included those who had supported this heresy, including Pope Honorius I and four previous patriarchs of Constantinople. When the council had concluded, the decrees were sent to Rome where they were accepted by Agatho's successor, Pope Leo II. In his letter of confirmation of the council, Leo accuses, "Honorius who did not attempt to sanctify this Apostolic Church with the teaching of Apostolic tradition, but by profane treachery permitted its purity to be polluted".

During the council's proceedings, a Monothelite priest named Polychronius claimed he could raise the dead, thereby proving his faith supreme. He had a corpse brought forth, but after whispering prayers into its ears, he could not revive the body. Despite his defeat, he continued to confess Monothelitism and was anathematised by the council.

== See also ==
- Boniface Consiliarius

== Bibliography ==
- Bathrellos, Demetrios (2004). The Byzantine Christ: Person, Nature, and Will in the Christology of Saint Maximus the Confessor. Oxford-New York: Oxford University Press. ISBN 978-0199258642.
- "Concilium Universale Constantinopolitanum Tertium", in Acta Conciliorum Oecumenicorum, ser. 2, II.1–2. ed. R. Riedinger (Berlin 1990 and 1992).
- Ekonomou, Andrew J. 2007. Byzantine Rome and the Greek Popes: Eastern influences on Rome and the papacy from Gregory the Great to Zacharias, A.D. 590–752. Lexington Books.
- Hovorun, Cyril (2008). Will, Action and Freedom: Christological Controversies in the Seventh Century. Leiden-Boston: BRILL. ISBN 978-9004166660.
- Meyendorff, John (1989). Imperial unity and Christian divisions: The Church 450–680 A.D. The Church in history. Vol. 2. Crestwood, NY: St. Vladimir's Seminary Press. ISBN 978-0-88-141056-3.
- Ostrogorsky, George. History of the Byzantine State. New Brunswick: Rutgers University Press. ISBN 0-8135-0599-2
- Siecienski, Anthony Edward (2010). The Filioque: History of a Doctrinal Controversy. Oxford University Press. ISBN 9780195372045.
