= Patriarch Macarius of Antioch =

Patriarch Macarius of Antioch may refer to:

- Macarius I of Antioch, Patriarch in 656–681
- Macarius II of Antioch, Patriarch in 1164–1166
- Macarius III Ibn al-Za'im, Patriarch in 1647–1672
