= Theodore I Calliopas =

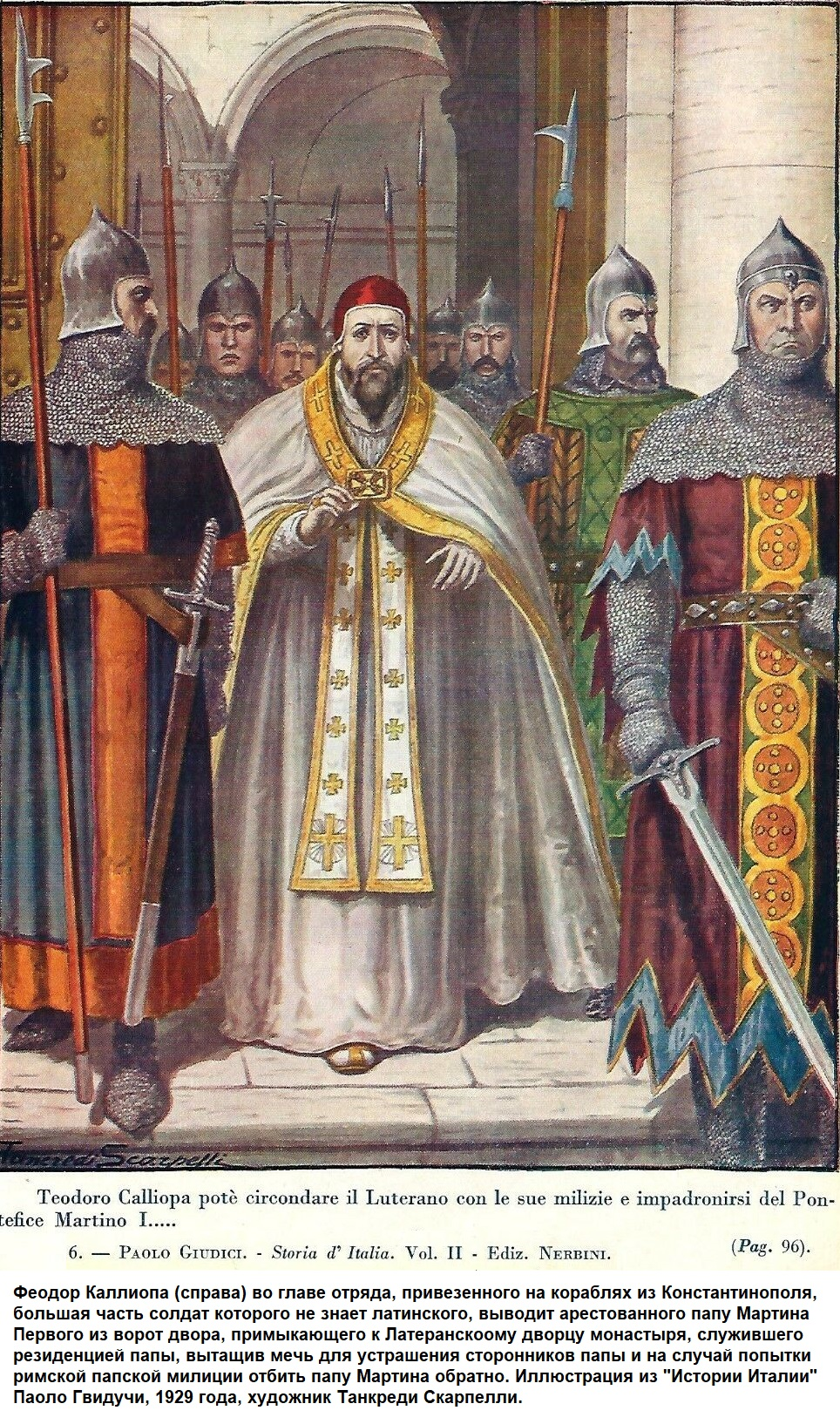
Theodore I (right) leading the arrested Pope Martin I (centre) away from Rome.

Theodore Calliopas (Latin: Theodorus Calliopus or Theodorus Calliopas; Greek: Θεόδωρος Καλλιοπάς, romanized: Theódōros Kalliopás) was Exarch of Ravenna from 643 to c. 645 and again from 653 to shortly before 666.

Nothing is known of Theodore's first term, except that he succeeded Isaac in 643 and was replaced by Plato c. 645.

Following the death of the Exarch Olympius in 652, however, he was returned to his former position. Theodore subsequently carried out the orders given to his predecessor, to arrest Pope Martin I. The exarch entered Rome in 653, whereupon he and a detachment of soldiers dragged the pope from the Lateran, and then sent him on a ship to Naxos. Theodore then attempted, without success, to convince the Romans to elect a new pope; only in the next year was Eugene I made pope. Before 666 he was succeeded as exarch by Gregory.

Preceded by Isaac the Armenian	Exarch of Ravenna; 643 – c.645	Succeeded by Plato
Preceded by Olympius	Exarch of Ravenna; 653 – b.666	Succeeded by Gregory
