= Monoenergism =

Doctrine in medieval Christianity stating that Christ had only one "energy"

Monoenergism (Greek: μονοενεργητισμός) was a notion in early medieval Christian theology, representing the belief that Christ had only one "energy" (energeia). The teaching of one energy was propagated during the first half of the seventh century by Patriarch Sergius I of Constantinople. Opposition to dyoenergism, its counterpart, would persist until Dyoenergism was espoused as Orthodoxy at the Sixth Ecumenical Council and monoenergism was rejected as heresy.

== History ==
After the failure of Emperor Justinian I and the Second Council of Constantinople to mend the Chalcedonian schism and unify main Christian communities within the Byzantine Empire by a single Christology, similar efforts were renewed by Heraclius (610–641), who attempted to solve the schism between the Chalcedonian (also called dyophysite) party and the non-Chalcedonian miaphysite party, suggesting the compromise of monoenergism.

This compromise adopted the Chalcedonian dyophysite belief that Christ the Incarnate Logos of God is of and in two natures, but tried to address non-Chalcedonian miaphysite misgivings by the view that Christ had one "energy" (energeia), a term whose definition was left deliberately vague. Monoenergism was accepted by the Patriarchs of Constantinople, Antioch, and Alexandria, as well as by the Armenians and was not clearly criticized by Pope Honorius I of Rome in his 635 epistle. However, it was rejected by Athanasius I Gammolo and the strong opposition of Patriarch Sophronius of Jerusalem won wide support. This led Heraclius to abandon the teaching in 638 (though still condemning dyoenergism) and to attempt to enforce instead the doctrine of monothelitism, opposed most notably by Maximus the Confessor. This too failed to heal the schism and theologically unite the empire.

Both monoenergism and monotheletism were condemned as heresies by the Sixth Ecumenical Council, held in Constantinople in 680–681.

== See also ==
- Ecthesis
- Essence–energies distinction
- Miaphysitism
- Monergism
- Monothelitism
- Typos of Constans

== Sources ==
- Sophronius of Jerusalem (2009). Pauline, Allen (ed.). Sophronius of Jerusalem and Seventh Century Heresy. Oxford Early Christian Texts. Oxford University Press. ISBN 978-0-19-954693-0.
- Conterno, Maria (2013). "Three Unpublished Texts on Christ's Unique Will and Operation from the Syriac Florilegium in the ms. London, British Library, Add. 14535". Millennium: Yearbook on the Culture and History of the First Millennium C.E. 10: 115–144.
- Hovorun, Cyril (2008). Will, Action and Freedom: Christological Controversies in the Seventh Century. Leiden-Boston: Brill. ISBN 978-90-04-16666-0.
- Meyendorff, John (1983). Byzantine Theology: Historical Trends and Doctrinal Themes (Revised 2 ed.). New York: Fordham University Press. ISBN 978-0-8232-0967-5.
- Meyendorff, John (1989). Imperial unity and Christian divisions: The Church 450-680 A.D. Crestwood, NY: St. Vladimir's Seminary Press. ISBN 978-0-88141-056-3.
- Ostrogorsky, George (1956). History of the Byzantine State. Oxford: Basil Blackwell.
