= Macarius I of Antioch =

Patriarch of Antioch from 656 to 681

- Eastern Orthodox Patriarch of Antioch
- Installed: 656
- Term ended: 681
- Predecessor: George I of Antioch
- Successor: Theophanes of Antioch

Macarius I of Antioch was Patriarch of Antioch from 656 to 681, when he was deposed for professing monothelitism.

== Life ==
His title seems to have been a purely honorary one, for his patriarchate lay under the dominion of the Saracens, and he himself resided at Constantinople. Nothing is known of him before the Sixth Ecumenical Council, which deposed him on account of his monothelitism, after which he disappeared into obscurity in a Roman monastery. Nonetheless, he is noted in ecclesiastical history for causing the anathemisation or condemnation of Pope Honorius I.

In the first session of the council, the Roman legates delivered an address in which they described four successive patriarchs of Constantinople and others as having "disturbed the peace of the world by new and unorthodox expressions", referring to the controversial doctrine of monothelitism. Macarius retorted, "We did not publish new expressions but what we have received from the holy and œcumenical synods and from holy approved fathers". He then went through the names given by the legates, adding to them that of Honorius.

In this and the following session Macarius was unable to find any references to monothelitism in a passage from Cyril of Alexandria and Pope Leo I. In the third session, several documents which he claimed emanated from Mennas and Pope Vigilius were found to be forgeries, surreptitiously introduced into the Acts of the Fifth Ecumenical Council. In the fifth and sixth sessions, he and his adherents produced three volumes of patristic testimonies which were sealed up for later examination. In the eighth session, he read his ecthesis, or "profession of faith", in which he appealed to the authority of Honorius on behalf of Monothelitism. In answer to questions put to him by the Emperor, he declared that he would rather be cut to pieces and thrown into the sea than admit the doctrine of dyothelitism, which states that Jesus Christ had two wills, the divine and human. In this same session and the following one his patristic testimonies were found to be hopelessly garbled. He was formally deposed at the close of the ninth session.

Although his case was closed, Macarius had left the council in order to do more work. The papal legates seemed determined that monothelitism should be disposed of once and for all, so, when at the eleventh session the emperor inquired if there was any further business, they answered that there were some further writings presented by Macarius and one of his disciples still awaiting examination. Among these documents was the first letter of Honorius to Sergius I of Constantinople. The legates, apparently without any reluctance, accepted the necessity of condemning Honorius. They must have felt that any other course of action would leave the door open for a revival of monothelitism. Their conduct in this respect is the more noteworthy because the Sixth General Council acted throughout on the assumption that the doctrinal definitions of the Roman Pontiff were irreformable. The council had not met to deliberate but to bring about submission to the epistle of Pope Agatho — an uncompromising assertion of papal infallibility — addressed to it.

At the close of the council Macarius and five others were sent to Rome "as the place they were more likely to be converted from their errors". This was done at the request of the council and not, as Hefele makes it appear, at the request of Macarius and his adherents. Macarius and three others who still held out were confined in different monasteries (see Liber Pontificalis, Leo II).

Later on, Pope Benedict II tried for thirty days to persuade Macarius to recant. This attempt was quoted in the first session of the Seventh General Council as a precedent for the restoration of bishops who had been declared heretics. Baronius gives reasons for supposing that Benedict's purpose was to restore Macarius to his patriarchal dignity, the patriarch who had succeeded him having just died (Annales, ann. 685).

The profession of faith in the Eucharist, in his "Ecthesis", is perhaps the earliest instance of a reference to this doctrine in a formal creed. To Macarius the Eucharist was a palmary argument against Nestorianism. The flesh and blood in the Eucharist is not mere flesh and blood, he argued, for how else could it be life-giving? He contended that it is life-giving because it is the own flesh and blood of the Word, which being God is by nature Life. Macarius develops this argument in a manner which shows how shadowy the line was which separated the Monothelite from the Monophysite.

== See also ==
- Honorius I
- Councils of Constantinople

== Sources ==
- Meyendorff, John (1989). Imperial unity and Christian divisions: The Church 450-680 A.D. The Church in history. Vol. 2. Crestwood, NY: St. Vladimir's Seminary Press. ISBN 9780881410563.
