= Papal profession of faith (late 7th century) =

The Liber Diurnus Romanorum Pontificum includes a formula of profession of faith that a newly elected Pope sent to the representative at Ravenna of the Emperor of Constantinople soon after the Third Council of Constantinople (680–681), which is referred to in the text as held "recently". The Catholic Encyclopedia asserts that "the oath (was) taken by every new pope from the eighth century to the eleventh".

This profession of faith cannot have been presented to the Exarch of Ravenna at any time after the papacy revolted – soon after 727 (see Eutychius (exarch)) – against the Emperor. The Exarchate itself was finally extinguished in 752.

The profession of faith in the Liber Diurnus Romanorum Pontificum is addressed to Saint Peter in a form somewhat reminiscent of an oath. However, the book nowhere calls it an oath.

Ambiguous expressions in some anti-Catholic writings could lead incautious readers to suppose that the text in the Liber Diurnus Romanorum Pontificum was used by all newly elected Popes until the eleventh century and that it had been in use since the fifth century.

An example is William Webster's An Ecumenical Council Officially Condemns a Pope for Heresy:

In the Liber Diurnus the Formulary of the Roman Chancery (from the fifth to the eleventh century), there is found the old formula for the papal oath...according to which every new Pope, on entering upon his office, had to swear that "he recognised the sixth Ecumenical Council, which smote with eternal anathema the originators of the heresy (Monotheletism), Sergius, Pyrrhus, etc., together with Honorius" (Charles Joseph Hefele, A History of the Councils of the Church (Edinburgh: Clark, 1896), Volume V, pp. 181-187).

However, Webster does not expressly state that the formula in the Liber Diurnus Romanorum Pontificum was used by Popes from the fifth to the eleventh century, which would obviously be impossible. The Liber Diurnus formula speaks of the Third Council of Constantinople as recently held and mentions by name the Pope and the Emperor involved in the Council. Popes outside the 682–727 period would not have spoken of the 680–681 Council as recent, and it would be particularly ridiculous to suppose that Popes from two centuries before the Council knew anything whatever about that Council.

== See also ==
- Credo of the People of God (profession of faith of Pope Paul VI)

== Sources ==
- Patrologia Latina, 105, columns 9-188
