= Pope Honorius =

Honorius has been the name of four Roman Catholic Popes and one Antipope. The name is of Latin origin, derived from honōrō ("honor, respect").

- Pope Honorius I (625–638)
  - Antipope Honorius II (1061–1072)
- Pope Honorius II (1124–1130)
- Pope Honorius III (1216–1227)
- Pope Honorius IV (1285–1287)
