= Venantius of Salona =

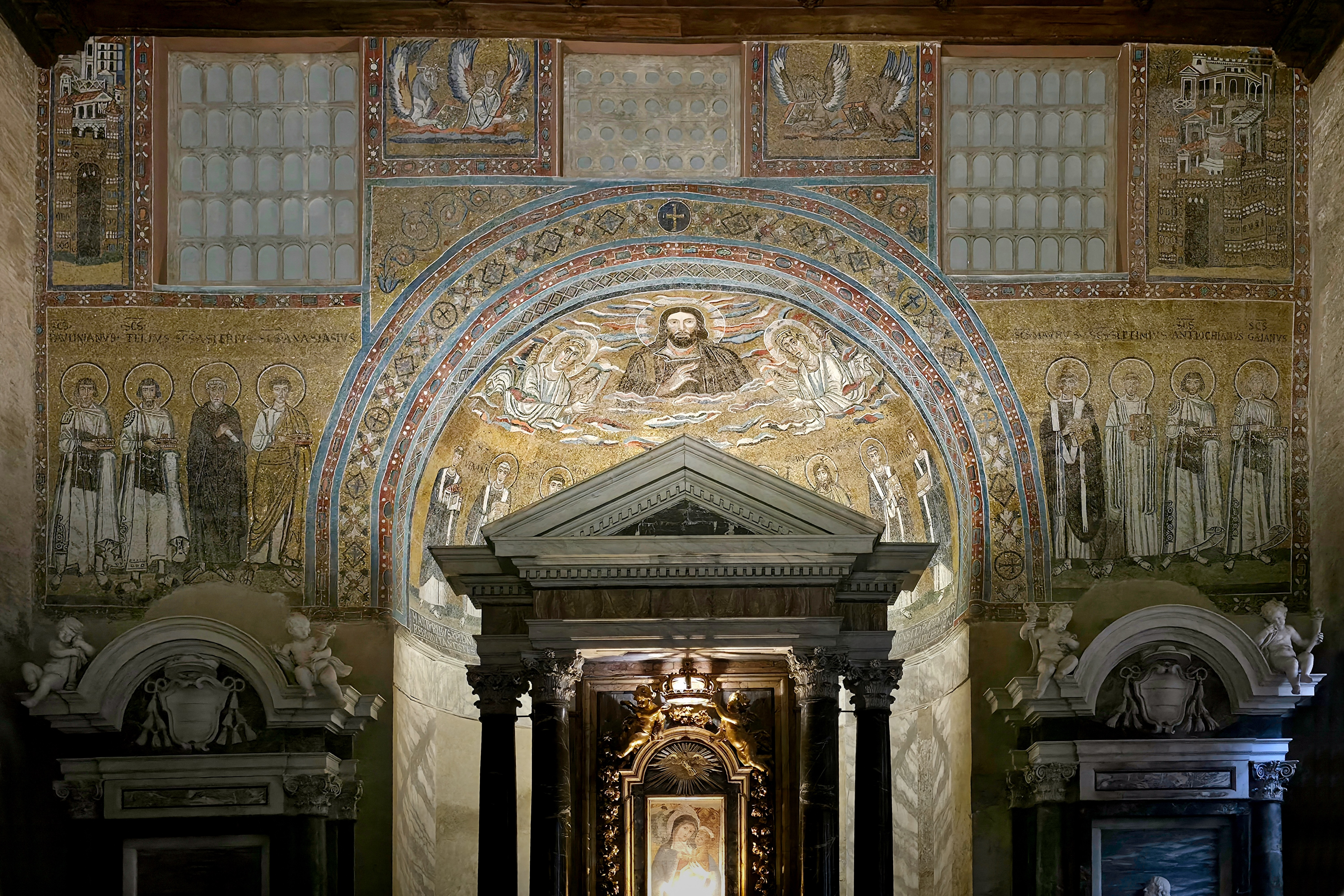

Venantius of Salona (also Wigand; died 259), was a Christian saint, martyr and Bishop of Salona in Dalmatia, active in the later half of the third century AD. He was possibly martyred in Delminium.

He either was the first bishop or succeeded Saint Domnius as bishop.

Originally buried in Dalmatia, his body was brought to Rome by Pope John IV in 640 and his relics, with other three local saints Domnius, Maurus and Anastasius, were in the baptistery of the Lateran Basilica - in Chapel of San Venanzio, which also contains a mosaic of them.

Unlike other saints he was not found in early martyrologies, appearing for the first time in a twelfth-century Hungarian liturgical calendar.

His feast day was on 1 April. As well as Rome and Dalmatia he was a popular saint in Toledo.
