= Council of Hatfield =

The Council of Hatfield (Latin: Concilium Hatfeldiensis) was a Christian convocation held in 680 AD in Hatfield, Hertfordshire in Anglo-Saxon England to examine the English branch of the local Celtic Rite's stance on Monothelitism. John of St. Peter's, a colleague of Benedict Biscop's at Wearmouth Abbey, was Pope Agatho's delegate. Archbishop Theodore led the council, where Monothelitism was rejected in favor of the orthodox Christological view that Jesus Christ has two wills corresponding to his two natures (divine and human).
