= Dyothelitism =

Doctrine in Christian theology stating that Christ has two wills (divine and human)

Dyothelitism or dithelitism (from Greek δυοθελητισμός "doctrine of two wills") is the Christological doctrine that teaches the existence of two wills (divine and human) in the person of Jesus Christ. Specifically, dyothelitism correlates the distinctiveness of two wills with the existence of two specific natures (divine and human) in the person of Jesus Christ, in a dyophysite context.

== History ==
Dyothelitism as a position stands in opposition to the view of monothelitism, the doctrine of Jesus having one will, in Christological thought. Dyothelitism was championed by Maximus the Confessor. The conflict arose between varying views of the constitution of a 'person' and 'will': monothelites believe that a single person can only possess a single will without arising in conflict, whereas dyothelites emphasize the perfect humanity in Christ's nature.

The debate concerning the monothelite and dithelite churches came to a conclusion at the Third Council of Constantinople in 681. The Council declared that, in line with the declarations of the Council of Chalcedon in 451, just as there are two natures in the one person of Jesus Christ, there are equally two "wills" or "modes of operation" in the one person of Jesus as well:

And we, most pious Lord, accepting the teaching of the suggestion sent to your most gentle Fortitude by the most holy and blessed Agatho, Pope of Old Rome, and of that other suggestion which was adopted by the council subject to him, and following the sense therein contained, so we are minded, so we profess, and so we believe that in our one Lord Jesus Christ, our true God, there are two natures unconfusedly, unchangeably, undividedly, and two natural wills and two natural operations; and all who have taught, and who now say, that there is but one will and one operation in the two natures of our one Lord Jesus Christ our true God, we anathematize.

Chalcedonian Christianity accepts dyothelitism as theologically orthodox. The Catechism of the Catholic Church states:

"Similarly, at the Sixth ecumenical council, Constantinople III in 681, the Church confessed that Christ possesses two wills and two natural operations, divine and human. They are not opposed to each other, but co-operate in such a way that the Word made flesh willed humanly in obedience to his Father all that he had decided divinely with the Father and the Holy Spirit for our salvation. Christ's human will 'does not resist or oppose but rather submits to his divine and almighty will.'"

== Thomism ==
Saint Thomas Aquinas, Doctor of the Church, distinguished (S.Th. III, q. 18) in Jesus Christ God two types of will (dyothelitism: the divine and the human will) as a consequence of His human-divine nature. Like in the human creatures, the human will is split into three aspects: sensitive appetite, natural appetite and rational appetite.

The natural appetite (will) is spontaneously and naturally inclined and disposed towards the good, but it does not know the means necessary to achieve it. The rational appetite (will), also called deliberative will, chooses through reason the means necessary to achieve the ultimate end, which is the Supreme Good, identified with God himself.

Generally, the rational will is the freedom of human beings and dominates and prevails over all others. However, in imperfect men who are slaves to sin, the sensual appetite, common to the animal kingdom, can prevail.

This cannot be true for Christ who is true and perfect man as well as true and perfect God (without any stain of sin). In Jesus Christ God, the human rational will is always in harmony with and never contradicts His divine will.

The divine will of Jesus Christ God is the same as that of God the Father and God the Holy Spirit.

== See also ==
- Monothelitism
- Dyoenergism
- Council of Chalcedon
- Christology

== Sources ==
- Hovorun, Cyril (2008). Will, Action and Freedom: Christological Controversies in the Seventh Century. Leiden-Boston: BRILL. ISBN 978-9004166660.
- Andrew Loke, "On Dyothelitism Versus Monothelitism: The Divine Preconscious Model", The Heythrop Journal, vol. 57/1 (2016) 135–141.
- Meyendorff, John (1983). Byzantine Theology: Historical Trends and Doctrinal Themes (Revised 2 ed.). New York: Fordham University Press. ISBN 9780823209675.
- Meyendorff, John (1989). Imperial unity and Christian divisions: The Church 450-680 A.D. The Church in history. Vol. 2. Crestwood, NY: St. Vladimir's Seminary Press. ISBN 9780881410563.
- Ostrogorsky, George (1956). History of the Byzantine State. Oxford: Basil Blackwell.
