= Andrew J. Ekonomou =

Andrew Ekonomou
- Born: Andrew John Ekonomou
- Education: Emory University (BA, MA, JD, PhD)
- Spouse: Georgia Lambros

Andrew John Ekonomou is an attorney in Donald Trump's legal team working under Jay Sekulow. He is a scholar of Byzantine history, having received his PhD in the topic from Emory University in 2000. Ekonomou serves as senior counsel at the American Center for Law and Justice where Sekulow is chief counsel. Ekonomou is a former state prosecutor who occasionally prosecutes cases for a district attorney's office in southeastern Georgia, and a former federal prosecutor who at one time served as the acting United States Attorney for the Northern District of Georgia.
