= Olympius (exarch) =

Olympius (Ancient Greek: Ολύμπιος, romanized: Olúmpios; died 652) was Exarch of Ravenna from 649 until his death in 652. Prior to his term as exarch, Olympius was an imperial chamberlain at Constantinople.

In 649, according to the Liber Pontificalis, the Byzantine emperor Constans II ordered Olympius to arrest Pope Martin I on the grounds that the pope's election had not been submitted to the emperor for approval. Constans was upset with Martin's condemnation of the Monothelite heresy; he feared that it would resurrect the religious conflict that had plagued the empire. Olympius attempted to gain the support of the citizenry of Rome, as well as the bishops; he also allegedly considered ordering the assassination of Martin. None of his actions, however, met with much success.

Eventually, Olympius decided to switch his allegiance and sided with the Pope, simultaneously declaring himself emperor. He marched into Sicily in 652, either to fight the Saracens or the local Byzantine forces. However, his army was stricken by an unknown disease, which killed Olympius that same year.

Preceded by Plato	Exarch of Ravenna; 649–652	Succeeded by Theodore I Calliopas
