= Pope Theodore I =

Head of the Catholic Church from 642 to 649

- Bishop of Rome
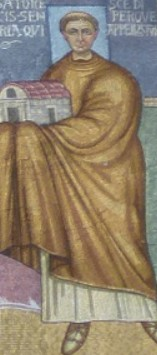
- Modern mosaic at Santa Maria Liberatrice a Monte Testaccio
- Church: Catholic Church
- Papacy began: 24 November 642
- Papacy ended: 14 May 649
- Predecessor: John IV
- Successor: Martin I

Personal details
- Born: Jerusalem, Palaestina Prima, Byzantine Empire
- Died: 14 May 649 Rome

Saint Pope Theodore I
- Venerated in: Catholic Church, Eastern Orthodox Church

Pope Theodore I (Latin: Theodorus I; died 14 May 649) was the bishop of Rome from 24 November 642 to his death on 14 May 649. His pontificate was dominated by the struggle with Monothelitism.

== Early career ==
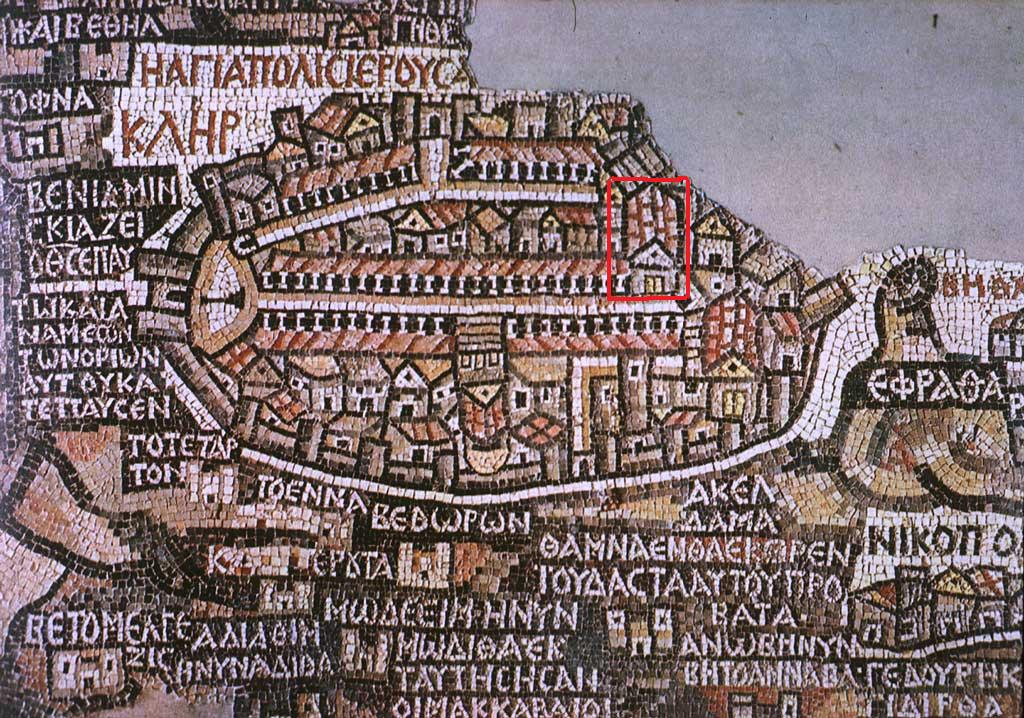
The Madaba Map, a 6th-century mosaic image of Jerusalem, roughly contemporary with Pope Theodore I. The New Church of the Theotokos (red square in image) was a few decades old during Theodore's youth.

According to the Liber Pontificalis, Theodore was a Greek man from Jerusalem whose father, Theodore, had been a bishop in the city; he is the only pope to have been a native of that city. He was among the many Syrian clergy who fled to Rome following the Muslim conquest of the Levant. He was made a cardinal deacon possibly around 640 and a full cardinal by Pope John IV.

== Pontificate ==
Theodore I's election was supported by the exarch of Ravenna, who governed Italy in the name of the emperor in Constantinople. He was installed on 24 November 642, succeeding John IV. The main focus of his pontificate was the continued struggle against the heretical Monothelites. He refused to recognize Paul II as the patriarch of Constantinople because Paul's predecessor, Pyrrhus I, had not been correctly replaced. He pressed Emperor Constans II to withdraw the Ecthesis of Heraclius. While his efforts made little impression on Constantinople, it increased the opposition to the teaching in the West; Pyrrhus even briefly recanted Monothelitism in 645, but was excommunicated in 648. Paul was excommunicated in 649. In response, Paul destroyed the Roman altar in the palace of Placidia and exiled or imprisoned the papal apocrisiarius. He also sought to end the issue with the emperor by promulgating the Type of Constans, ordering that the Ecthesis be taken down and seeking to end discussion on the doctrine.

Theodore planned the Lateran Council of 649 to condemn the Ecthesis, but died before he could convene it. His successor, Martin I, did so instead. Theodore was buried in Old St. Peter's Basilica. His feast day in the Eastern Orthodox Church is on 18 May.

== Notes ==
Catholic Church titles
Preceded by John IV	Pope; 642–649	Succeeded by Martin I
