= Pope Eugene I =

Head of the Catholic Church from 654 to 657

Pope Saint Eugene I
- Bishop of Rome
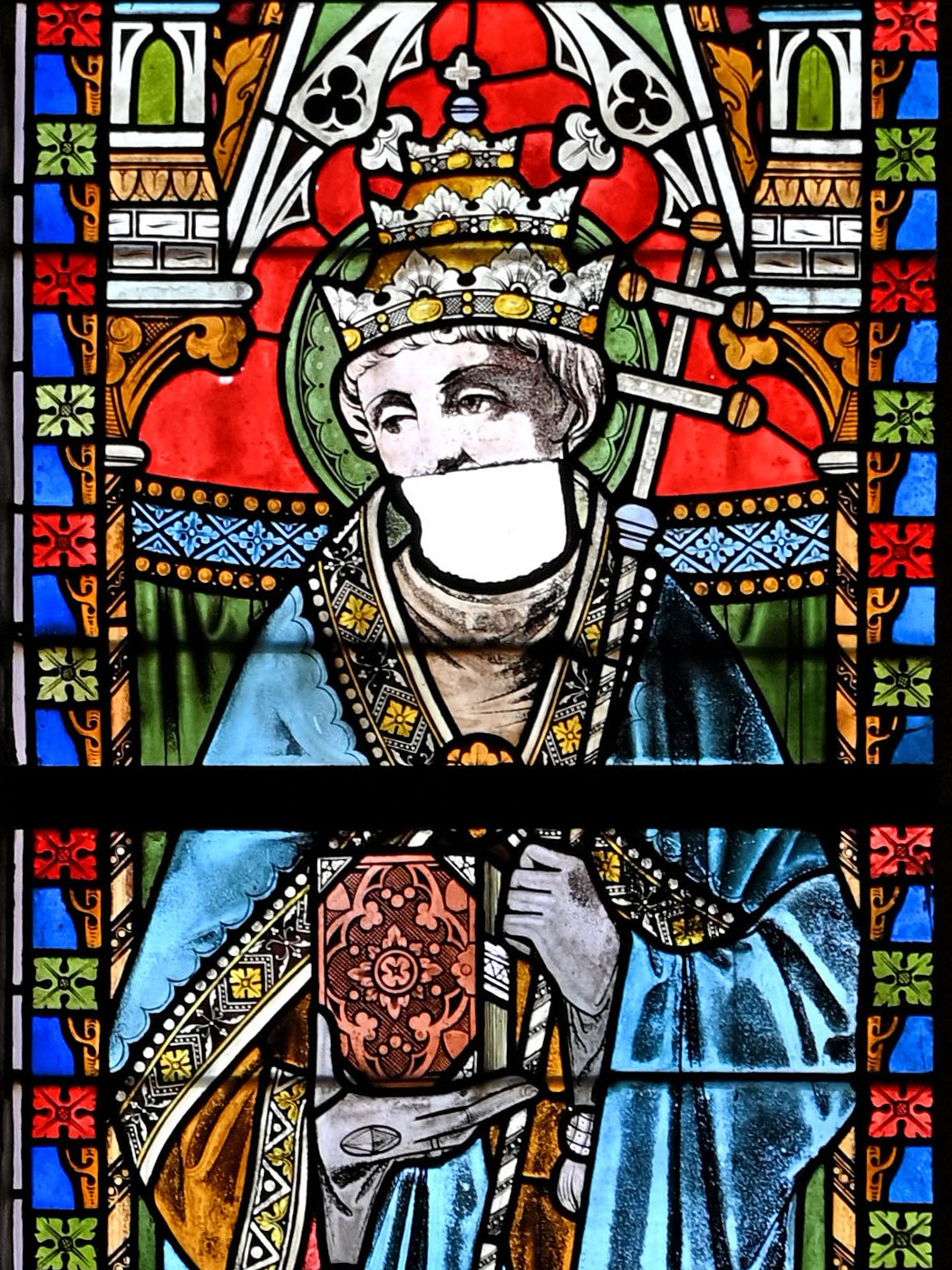
- Stained glass mural depicting Pope Eugene I, France
- Church: Catholic Church
- Papacy began: 10 August 654
- Papacy ended: 2 June 657
- Predecessor: Martin I
- Successor: Vitalian

Personal details
- Born: Rome, Byzantine Empire
- Died: 2 June 657 Rome, Byzantine Empire

Sainthood
- Feast day: 2 June

Pope Eugene I (Latin: Eugenius I; died 2 June 657) was the bishop of Rome from 10 August 654 to his death on 2 June 657. He was chosen to become Pope after the deposition and banishment of Martin I by Emperor Constans II over the dispute about Monothelitism.

== Unusual election ==
Eugene was a Roman from the Aventine, son of Rufinianus. He was brought up in the Church's ministry, and was already an elderly priest when a dispute flared up between the papacy in Rome, which opposed the monothelite teachings, and the imperial government in Constantinople, which supported it. As a result, Pope Martin I was deposed by Emperor Constans II and carried off from Rome on 18 June 653, eventually ending up banished to Cherson. Little is known about what happened in Rome after Martin's departure, but it was typical in those days for the Holy See to be governed by the archpriest and archdeacon. Martin hoped that a successor would not be elected while he lived, but the imperial court exerted pressure on Rome through the exarch of Ravenna. On 10 August 654, Eugene was appointed the new pope, to which Martin acceded. The imperial government believed that Eugene would be cooperative and ratified his election.

== Pontificate ==
As pope, Eugene consecrated twenty-one bishops for different parts of the world and received the youthful Wilfrid on the occasion of his first visit to Rome (c. 654).

Eugene I showed greater deference than his predecessor to the emperor's wishes and made no public stand against the Monothelitism of the patriarchs of Constantinople. One of the first acts of the new pope was to send legates to Constantinople with letters to Emperor Constans II informing him of his election and professing his faith. The legates were deceived, or bribed, and brought back a synodical letter from Patriarch Peter of Constantinople (656–666), while the emperor's envoy, who accompanied them, brought offerings for Saint Peter and a request from the emperor that the pope would enter into communion with the patriarch of Constantinople. Peter's letter proved to be written in a difficult and obscure style and avoided making any specific declaration as to the number of "wills or operations" in Christ. When its contents were read to the clergy and people in the church of St. Mary Major in 656, they not only rejected the letter with indignation, but would not allow the pope to leave the basilica until he had promised that he would not on any account accept it.

The imperial officials were furious at this harsh rejection of the wishes of the emperor and patriarch. Constans threatened to dispose of Eugene just as he had disposed of Martin, but was preoccupied by defending the empire from the Muslim conquests.

== Death and legacy ==
Eugene I died on 2 June 657, before Constans II could act against him. He was buried in Old St. Peter's Basilica. He was acclaimed a saint, his feast day being 2 June. He is commemorated as the patron and namesake of the Cathedral of Saint Eugene in the Diocese of Santa Rosa in California.

== See also ==
- List of popes
- List of Catholic saints

== Bibliography ==
- Attwater, Aubrey (1939). A Dictionary of Popes: From Peter to Pius XII.

Catholic Church titles
Preceded by Martin I	Pope; 654–657	Succeeded by Vitalian
