= Monothelitism =

Christian theological doctrine

Monothelitism or monotheletism (Note: (from Greek: μονοθελητισμός, romanized: monothelētismós, lit. 'doctrine of one will')) is a theological doctrine in Christianity that was proposed in the 7th century, but was ultimately rejected and denounced as heresy by the Lateran Council of 649 and the 680–681 Third Council of Constantinople. It held Christ as having only one will and was thus contrary to dyothelitism, the Christological doctrine accepted by most Christian denominations, which holds Christ as having two wills (divine and human).

Historically, monothelitism was closely related to monoenergism, a theological doctrine that holds Jesus Christ as having only one energy. Both doctrines were at the center of Christological disputes during the 7th century. Theological notions related to the oneness of Christ's will emerged as a result of some earlier Christological controversies that were related to monophysitism as formulated by Eutyches (d. 456) and miaphysitism as formulated by non-Chalcedonian followers of Cyril of Alexandria (d. 444). Since the notion of Christ's one nature implied the oneness of his will, ecclesiastical and political elites of the Eastern Roman Empire tried during the 7th century to promote monothelitism as a unifying doctrine that would reconcile divided Christian factions. In spite of strong imperial support, those attempts failed.

Monothelitism is still today taught by some Protestant Christian philosophers, including William Lane Craig and J. P. Moreland. However, the dyothelite view is mainstream in all major branches of Christianity. Modern monothelitism is associated with a certain form of social trinitarianism.

== Background ==
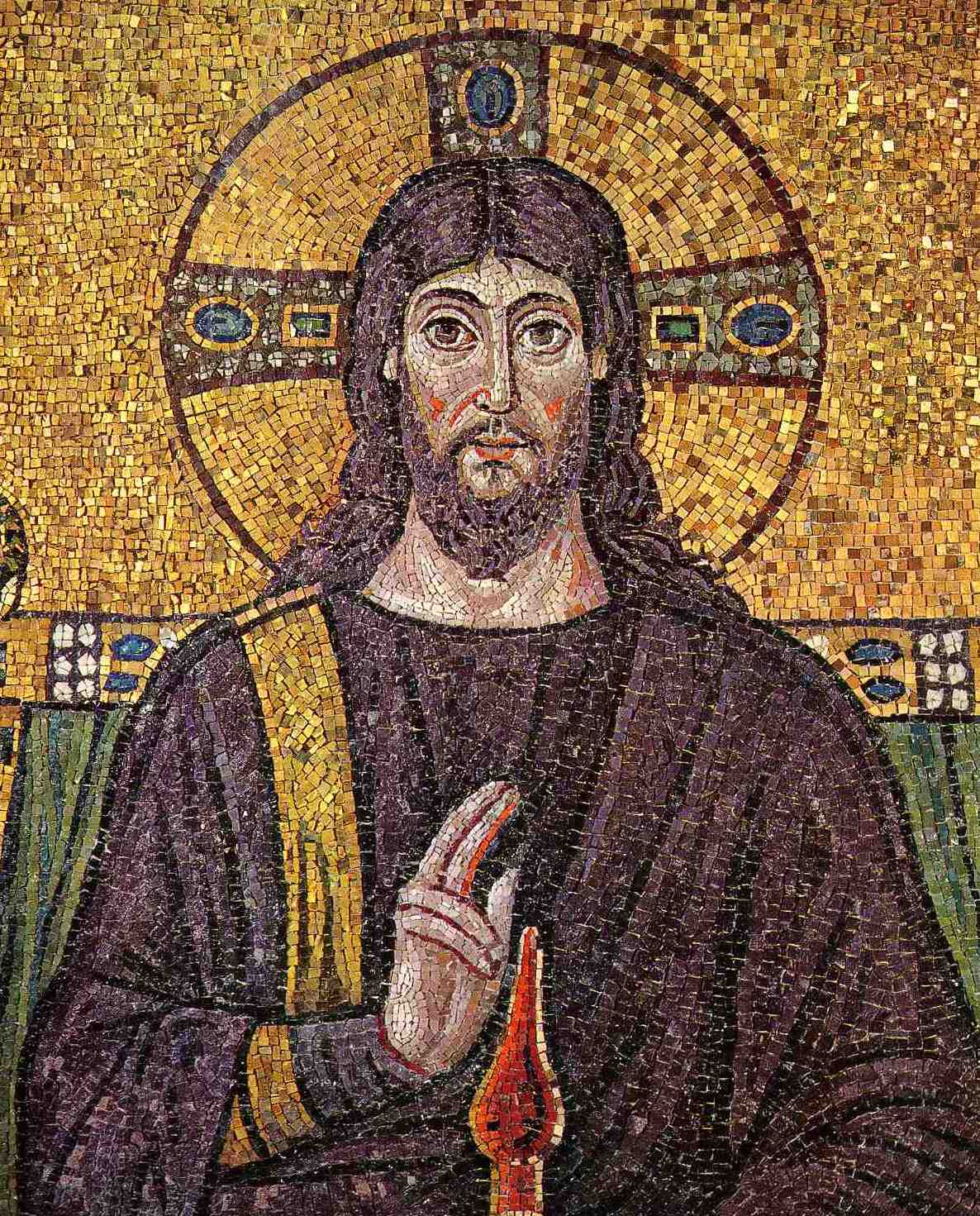
The ongoing debates about the nature of Christ caused controversy within the Church for centuries.

During the 5th century, some regions of the Church were thrown into confusion because of the debates that erupted over the nature of Jesus Christ. Although the Church had already determined that Christ is the son of God, his exact nature remained open to debate. The Church had declared heretical the notion that Jesus is not fully divine in the 4th century (see First Council of Nicaea), during the debates over Arianism, and had declared that he is God the Son who became human. However, in arguing that he is both God and man, there then emerged a dispute over exactly how the human and divine natures of Christ actually exist within the person of Christ.

The Christological definition of Chalcedon, as accepted by the Eastern Orthodox, Catholic, Anglican, Lutheran, and Reformed churches, is that Christ remains in two distinct natures, yet these two natures come together within his one hypostasis. More simply, Christ is known as "both fully human and fully Divine, one in being with the Father". This position was opposed by the Monophysites who held that Christ possesses one nature only. The term Monophysitism of which Eutychianism is one type, held that the human and divine natures of Christ were fused into one new single (mono) nature. As described by Eutyches, his human nature was "dissolved like a drop of honey in the sea", and therefore his nature is really divine. This is distinct from Miaphysitism, which holds that, after the union, Christ is in one theanthropic (human-divine) nature and is generated from the union of two natures. The two are thus united without separation, without confusion, and without alteration, and with each having a particularity. Miaphysitism is the christological doctrine of the Oriental Orthodox churches.

Nevertheless, the resultant debates led the Chalcedonians to accuse the non-Chalcedonians of teaching Christ's humanity to be of a different kind from our own. Meanwhile, the non-Chalcedonians accused the Chalcedonians of espousing a form of Nestorianism, a doctrine rejected in the preceding council that held that Jesus Christ was two distinct subsistences.

This internal division was dangerous for the Byzantine Empire, which was under constant threat from external enemies, especially as many of the areas most likely to be lost to the empire (which did happen as a result of the wars with the Umayyad Caliphate) were the regions that were in favour of Miaphysitism, and who considered the religious hierarchy at Constantinople to be heretics only interested in crushing their faith. In these provinces, the non-Chalcedonians were far more numerous than the Chalcedonians. In Egypt for instance, some 30,000 Greeks of Chalcedonian persuasion were ranged against some five million Coptic non-Chalcedonians. Meanwhile, Syria was divided between followers of the Chalcedonian Patriarch Paul I and Miaphysite Patriarch Sergius I, and Mesopotamia between Syriac Miaphysites and the Dyophysite Church of the East, while the Armenian Church was wholly Cyrilline Non-Chalcedonian, and the Palestinian Patriarch fully adhered to Chalcedonianism. Consequently, the Monothelite teaching emerged as a compromise position. The Byzantine emperor Heraclius tried to unite all of the various factions within the empire with this new formula that was more inclusive and more elastic.

That approach was needed to win over the non-Chalcedonians since they already believed that Christ has a single nature and so necessarily believed that he holds a single will. However, it was unclear whether the Chalcedonians should believe in Christ's human and divine energy and/or will as well as his human and divine nature because the ecumenical councils had made no ruling on that subject. A ruling for the new doctrine would provide common ground for the non-Chalcedonians and the Chalcedonians to come together, as the non-Chalcedonians could agree that Jesus has two natures if he has only one will, and some Chalcedonians could agree that Jesus has one will if he has two natures.

== First attempt: Doctrine of one energy ==
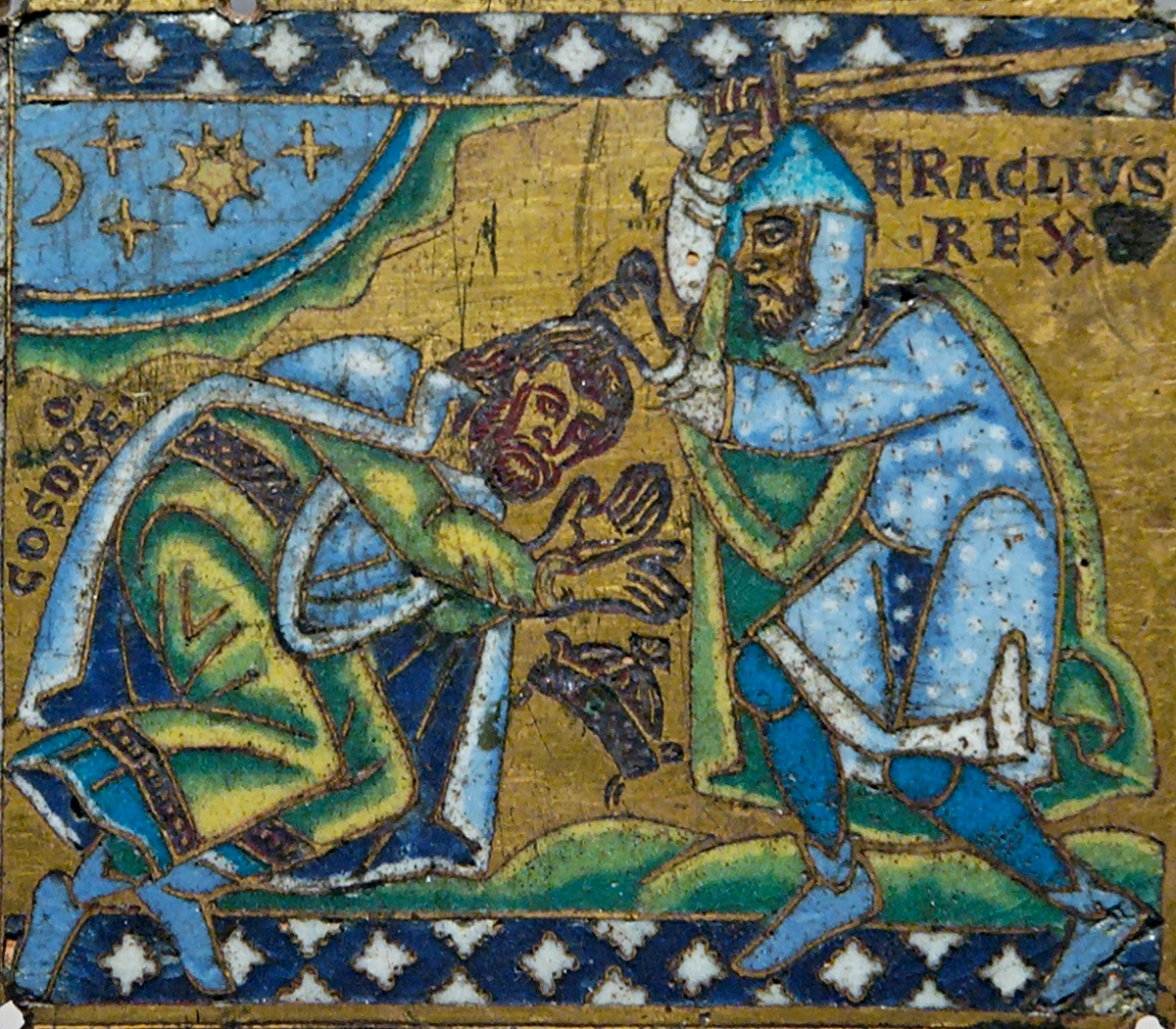
Emperor Heraclius, who defeated Persian King Khosrau II in this allegory, had a desire to secure internal harmony within his empire that made him adopt the doctrine of monothelitism.

Sergius I, Patriarch of Constantinople, was the driving force behind this doctrine, with the full blessing of Emperor Heraclius. Coming to the imperial throne in 610, the patriarch had long since converted the emperor to the new doctrine as by 622, Heraclius had communicated with Bishop Paul of Armenia where the emperor asserted that the energy, or the active force, of Christ was single. That doctrine of monoenergism was the precursor of monotheletism.

Heraclius's interest then focused on Armenia, and it was probably then that the emperor decided to use monoenergism as a political weapon to reconcile the Non-Chalcedonian Church of Armenia with the Imperial Church. To help bring that about, a synod was held in 622 at Theodosiopolis, called the Synod of Garin, where monoenergism was discussed. Over the next few years Heraclius was preoccupied with his prosecution of the war against the Sassanids, but by 626, he had issued a decree to Arcadius, Bishop of Cyprus, requesting him to teach the doctrine of "one hegumenic energy". By all accounts, that was met with notable success, particularly as there was then a large colony of Armenians on the island, which encouraged Heraclius to attempt to seek a wider approval of his compromise. In 626, he asked Patriarch Sergius to approach Cyrus, Bishop of Phasis, to secure his cooperation.

With the successful conclusion to the Persian War, Heraclius could devote more time to promoting his compromise, which was now more urgent because of the administration of the recovered monophysite (also referred to as "non-Chalcedonian" for rejecting of that particular council) provinces of Syria and Egypt. In 629, a meeting took place between the emperor and Athanasius the Jacobite at Hierapolis. An agreement was struck in which the Jacobites were to return to the Imperial Church on the basis of the single energy doctrine, and Athanasius was to be made Patriarch of Antioch. In 630, Bishop Cyrus was made Patriarch of Alexandria, who soon won over another non-Chalcedonian group. Very soon, three of the five patriarchates (Constantinople, Antioch and Alexandria) were teaching Christ's "one theandric energy".

Not everyone was convinced, particularly a monk of Palestine named Sophronius, who believed that there was something unsound in the doctrine and so became the champion of dyothelitism, the doctrine of the two wills of Christ. He was concerned that for the sake of ecclesiastical unity, doctrinal expressions were being compromised. For the first few years, Patriarch Sergius of Constantinople managed to keep him silent, but when Sophronius was appointed as Patriarch of Jerusalem in 634, he used his newfound position of authority to challenge the validity of the doctrine of monoenergism.

Determined to prevent that formidable challenge to his Christological compromise, Sergius wrote to Pope Honorius I (625–638) at Rome to ask him to endorse a position that Church unity should not be endangered by having any discussions or disputes over whether Christ had one energy or two. Sergius added that the doctrine of two energies could lead to the erroneous belief that Jesus has two conflicting wills. Honorius's reply in 635 endorsed that view that all discussions should cease and agreed that Jesus has only one will, not two conflicting wills, since Jesus assumed not the vitiated human nature, tainted by Adam's fall, but human nature as it existed prior to Adam's fall. In the meantime the epistola synodica of Sophronius appeared, the outcome of the Synod of Cyprus. It attempted to show that the new doctrine was inconsistent with orthodoxy. Sophronius declared that it was nothing more than a bastardised form of monophysitism, which went against the hard-fought achievements at Chalcedon. Suddenly, support for the doctrine began to subside, and soon, former supporters were busy finding flaws and inconsistencies in the proposal. Soon, Sergius and Heraclius abandoned it as a doctrine.

== Second attempt: Doctrine of one will ==
However, Sergius and the emperor refused to give up. Three years later, the patriarch came up with a slightly-modified formula, which Heraclius released as the Ecthesis in 638. The edict was considered to be the official response to Sophronius's letter. It forbade all mention of Christ possessing one or two energies; instead, it now proclaimed that Christ has two natures but a single will. This did not deny Christ human volition, but insisted that this volition could never be in opposition to the divine will; but the opponents of one will misinterpreted the doctrine as denying Christ any human volition whatever. Sophronius had died before the release of the new doctrine, and his replacement, Bishop Sergius of Jaffa, as Patriarch Abraham I of Jerusalem, approved the modified formula. Sergius died by the end of 638, and his replacement, Pyrrhus, was also a devoted monothelite and a close friend of Heraclius. The two remaining patriarchs in the East also gave their approval to the doctrine now referred to as monothelitism and so it looked as if Heraclius would finally heal the divisions in the imperial church.

Unfortunately, he had not counted on the popes at Rome. During the same year, 638, Pope Honorius I had died as well. His successor Pope Severinus (640) condemned the Ecthesis outright and so was forbidden his seat until 640. His successor, Pope John IV (640–42), also rejected the doctrine completely, leading to a major schism between the eastern and western halves of the Chalcedonian Church. When news reached Heraclius of the Pope's condemnation, he was already old and ill, and the news only hastened his death. He declared with his dying breath that the controversy was all due to Sergius and that the patriarch had pressured him to give his unwilling approval to the Ecthesis.

== Conflict with Rome ==
This state of schism remained for the next few years. The death of Heraclius in 641 had thrown the political situation in Constantinople into chaos, and his young grandson Constans II (641–668) succeeded him. Meanwhile, in Africa, a monk, Maximus the Confessor, carried on a furious campaign against monothelitism, and in 646, he convinced the African councils to draw up a manifesto against the doctrine, which they forwarded to the new pope, Theodore I (642–649), who, in turn, wrote to Patriarch Paul II of Constantinople to outline the heretical nature of monothelitism. Paul, another devoted monothelite, replied in a letter directing the pope to adhere to the doctrine of one will. Theodore, in turn, excommunicated the patriarch in 649 and declared Paul a heretic.

Constans II was only 17 and was indifferent to the religious debates convulsing the Church. However, he was concerned about the effect that the debate had on the Roman Empire and so he issued an imperial edict, the Type of Constans. The edict made it illegal to discuss in any manner Christ possessing either one or two wills or one or two energies. He declared that the whole controversy was to be forgotten: "the scheme which existed before the strife arose shall be maintained, as it would have been if no such disputation had arisen". However, he would soon discover that the controversy would not die down.

In Rome and the West, opposition to monothelitism was reaching fever pitch, and the Type of Constans did nothing to defuse the situation but indeed made it worse by implying that either doctrine was as good as the other. Theodore planned the Lateran Council of 649 to condemn the Ecthesis but died before he could convene it, which his successor, Pope Martin I (649–653), did. The council condemned the Ecthesis but also the Type. After the synod, Pope Martin wrote to Constans to inform him of its conclusions and to require him to condemn both the monothelite doctrine and his own Type. However, Constans was not the sort of emperor to take such a rebuke of imperial authority lightly.

Even while the Lateran Synod was sitting, Olympius arrived as the new exarch of Ravenna, with instructions to ensure that the Type was followed in Italy and to use whatever means necessary to ensure that the Pope adhered to it. He was unable to complete his mission and soon died, but his successor, Theodore I Calliopas, seized Pope Martin and abducted him to Constantinople, where he was imprisoned and tortured before he was condemned for breaking the imperial commands and banished to Chersonesus, where he soon died.

The emperor continued to persecute any who spoke out against monothelitism, including Maximus the Confessor and a number of his disciples. Maximus lost his tongue and his right hand in an effort to have him recant. Nevertheless, his brutality had an effect, with the patriarchs, including the popes, remaining silent throughout the remainder of his reign.

== Condemnation ==
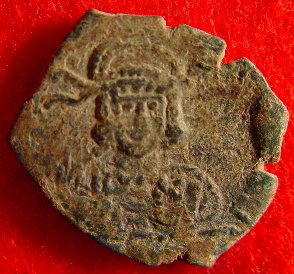
Emperor Constantine IV, who convened the Sixth Ecumenical Council in 678

After Constans's death in 668, the throne passed to his son Constantine IV. Pope Vitalian (657–672), who had hosted the visit of Constans II to Rome in 663, almost immediately declared himself for the doctrine of the two wills of Christ. In response, Patriarch Theodore I of Constantinople and Macarius, Patriarch of Antioch, both pressed Constantine to take some measures against the pope. Constantine, however, decided to let the monothelite question be decided entirely by a church council.

He asked if the pope (now Pope Agatho, 678–681) would be willing to send delegates to an ecumenical council to be held at Constantinople so that the question could be firmly ended. Pope Agatho agreed but first held a preliminary synod at Rome 680 to obtain the opinion of the western theologians. Other synods were also held at Milan and at the Council of Hatfield in 680, convoked by Archbishop Theodore of Canterbury. All of the western synods condemned monothelitism, and a report of the Roman synod's acts was sent to Constantinople, along with the western delegates to the council.

The council met from 680 to 681. Apart from the Roman representatives, it also hosted representatives from the Patriarchs of Alexandria and Jerusalem, and the Patriarchs of Constantinople and Antioch were present in person. With the exception of two individuals, it condemned the monothelite doctrine as one that diminished the fullness of Christ's humanity and asserted dyothelitism to be the true doctrine, with Christ possessing "two natural wills and two natural energies, without division, alteration, separation or confusion". It also anathematised the chief representatives of the discredited doctrine, including Pope Honorius. The churches condemned at Constantinople included the Oriental Orthodox Churches and the Maronite Church, but the Oriental Orthodox have denied that they ever held the monothelite view and describe their own Christology as Miaphysite, and the Maronites accept the Chalcedonian formula since they are in communion with the Roman Catholic Church. That brought to an end the controversy over monothelitism.

== Controversy over Honorius I ==
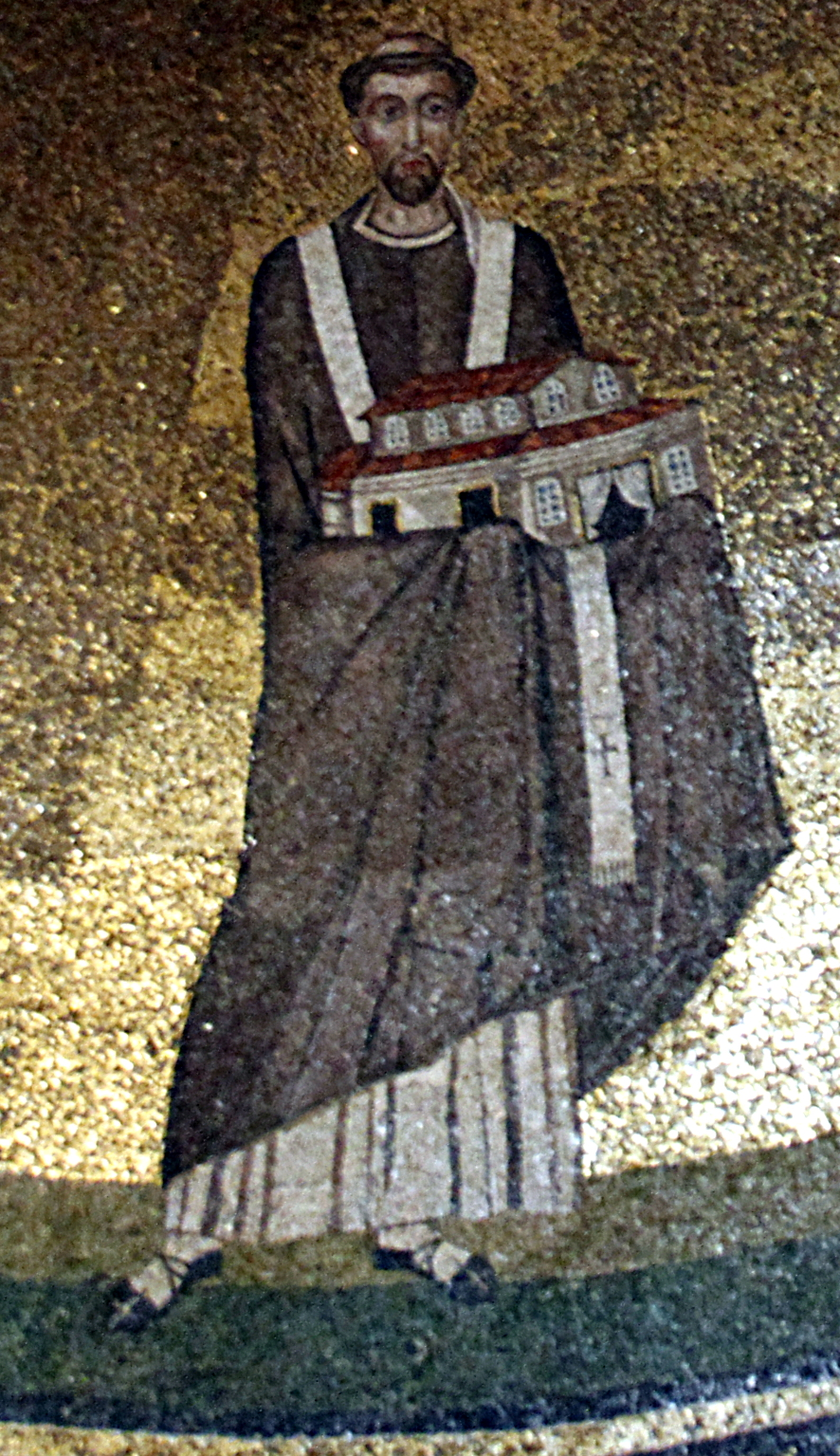
Pope Honorius I

A side issue over the statements of Pope Honorius I and his condemnation by the council arose in discussions concerning papal infallibility. In the view of historians such as John Bagnell Bury, Honorius, with a traditional Latin dislike for dialectics, did not fully comprehend the issues. The question of Monoenergism, as presented by Patriarch Sergius, seemed to Honorius to be a matter of grammar, rather than theology. Though he used the expression "one will", he was no Monothelite, for he placed "one energy" and "two energies" on exactly the same footing. Further, his second letter to Sergius was by and large orthodox. Maximus the Confessor, in his Disputation with Pyrrhus, interprets the statement "one will" as referring to the integrity of Christ's human will, in contrast to the fallen human will, which seeks diverse and contradictory goods.

The Third Council of Constantinople posthumously anathematised Honorius as a heretic: "And with these we define that there shall be expelled from the holy Church of God and anathematized Honorius who was some time Pope of Old Rome, because of what we found written by him to Sergius, that in all respects he followed his view and confirmed his impious doctrines" (13th session) and "To Honorius, the heretic, anathema!" (16th session).

However, Pope Leo II's letter of confirmation of the Council interprets the council as intending to criticise Honorius not for error of belief but for "imprudent economy of silence". Leo's letter stated: "We anathematize the inventors of the new error, that is, Theodore, Sergius,... and also Honorius, who did not attempt to sanctify this Apostolic Church with the teaching of Apostolic tradition, but by profane treachery permitted its purity to be polluted."

== Contemporary Monothelitism ==
Some contemporary theologians such as Alvin Plantinga have controversially argued that the council of Chalcedon allowed for two positions on Christology, an abstractist view where Jesus only assumed the property of being a human, while in the concretist view, he assumed concrete human nature, with a human soul, mind, and will. He argued that the abstractist position implies monothelitism within the incarnation, while the concretist position is dyothelitism. This monothelite view has been also held by J. P. Moreland and William Lane Craig. Craig has offered his own of Christology, where he argues that Jesus did not assume a human soul in the incarnation, but the soul of Jesus was instead the Logos, thus teaching that the will and rationality of Christ were divine. This is similar to the teaching of Apollinarius, whose Christology was condemned as a heresy by the first council of Constantinople. However, they sought to revise the doctrines of Apollinarus by arguing that Christ in eternity already possessed those properties necessary for human personality in archetypal form. However, these new Monothelite proposals are highly controversial, and all major branches of Christendom affirm dyothelitism as in the statements of the third council of Constantinople.

William Lane Craig's social trinitarian model in which all three persons are to be distinguished by having their own centers of consciousness and will lead one to view will as an attribute of hypostasis instead of nature, thus implying monothelitism.

== See also ==
- Apollinarism
- Chalcedonian Christianity
- Ecthesis
- Impeccability
- Monergism
- Monoenergism
- Papal profession of faith (late 7th century)
- Typos of Constans

== Sources ==
- Allen, Pauline (2009). Sophronius of Jerusalem and Seventh Century Heresy. Oxford University Press.
- Bede (1969). Colgrave, B.; Mynors, R. (eds.). Historia Ecclesiastica Gentis Anglorum. Oxford: Clarendon Press.
- Brauer, J. C., ed. (1971). Westminster Dictionary of Church History. Philadelphia: Westminster Press.
- Brock, Sebastian P. (1973a). "An Early Syriac Life of Maximus the Confessor". Analecta Bollandiana. 91 (3–4): 299–346. doi:10.1484/J.ABOL.4.01267.
- Brock, Sebastian P. (1973b). "A Syriac Fragment on the Sixth Council". Oriens Christianus. 57: 63–71. ISBN 9783447015332.
- Brock, Sebastian P. (1985). "A Monothelete Florilegium in Syriac". After Chalcedon: Studies in Theology and Church History. Leuven: Peeters Publishers. pp. 35–45. ISBN 9789070192150.
- Brock, Sebastian P. (1986). "Two Sets of Monothelete Questions to the Maximianists". Orientalia Lovaniensia Periodica. 17: 119–140.
- Bury, John B. (1889). A history of the later Roman empire from Arcadius to Irene. Vol. 2.
- Chadwick, Henry (1993). The Penguin History of the Church 1: The Early Church. Penguin.
- This article incorporates text from a publication now in the public domain: Chapman, John (1913). "Pope Honorius I". In Herbermann, Charles (ed.). Catholic Encyclopedia. Vol. 7. New York: Robert Appleton Company.
- Conterno, Maria (2013). "Three Unpublished Texts on Christ's Unique Will and Operation from the Syriac Florilegium in the ms. London, British Library, Add. 14535". Millennium: Yearbook on the Culture and History of the First Millennium C.E. 10: 115–144.
- Craig, William Lane (May 22, 2022). "Monothelitism and the Trinity". www.reasonablefaith.org.
- Hefele, Charles J. (1896). A History of the Councils of the Church, from the Original Documents. Vol. 5. AMS Press. ISBN 9780404032609 – via the Internet Archive.
- Hovorun, Cyril (2008). Will, Action and Freedom: Christological Controversies in the Seventh Century. Leiden-Boston: Brill. ISBN 978-9004166660.
- Meyendorff, John (1983). Byzantine Theology: Historical Trends and Doctrinal Themes (Revised 2 ed.). New York: Fordham University Press. ISBN 9780823209675.
- Meyendorff, John (1989). Imperial unity and Christian divisions: The Church 450-680 A.D. Crestwood, NY: St. Vladimir's Seminary Press. ISBN 9780881410556.
- Norwich, John J. (1988). Byzantium: The Early Centuries. Penguin.
- Ostrogorsky, George (1956). History of the Byzantine State. Oxford: Basil Blackwell.
- Price, Richard M. (2010). "The Christological Controversies of the Age of Jacob of Edessa". Studies on Jacob of Edessa. Piscataway: Gorgias Press. pp. 81–92. doi:10.31826/9781463216634-007. ISBN 9781463216634.
- Stamps, Robert Lucas (2014-05-16). "Thy Will Be Done": A Dogmatic Defense of Dyothelitism in Light of Recent Monothelite Proposals (PhD thesis). Southern Baptist Theological Seminary.
- Stefon, Matt, ed. (2011). Christianity. The Rosen Publishing Group. ISBN 978-1-61530542-1.
- Suermann, Harald (1998). Die Gründungsgeschichte der Maronitischen Kirche. Wiesbaden: Harrassowitz. ISBN 3-447-04088-2.
