= Pope Martin I =

Bishop of Rome from 649 to 653/4

Pope Saint Martin I
- Bishop of Rome
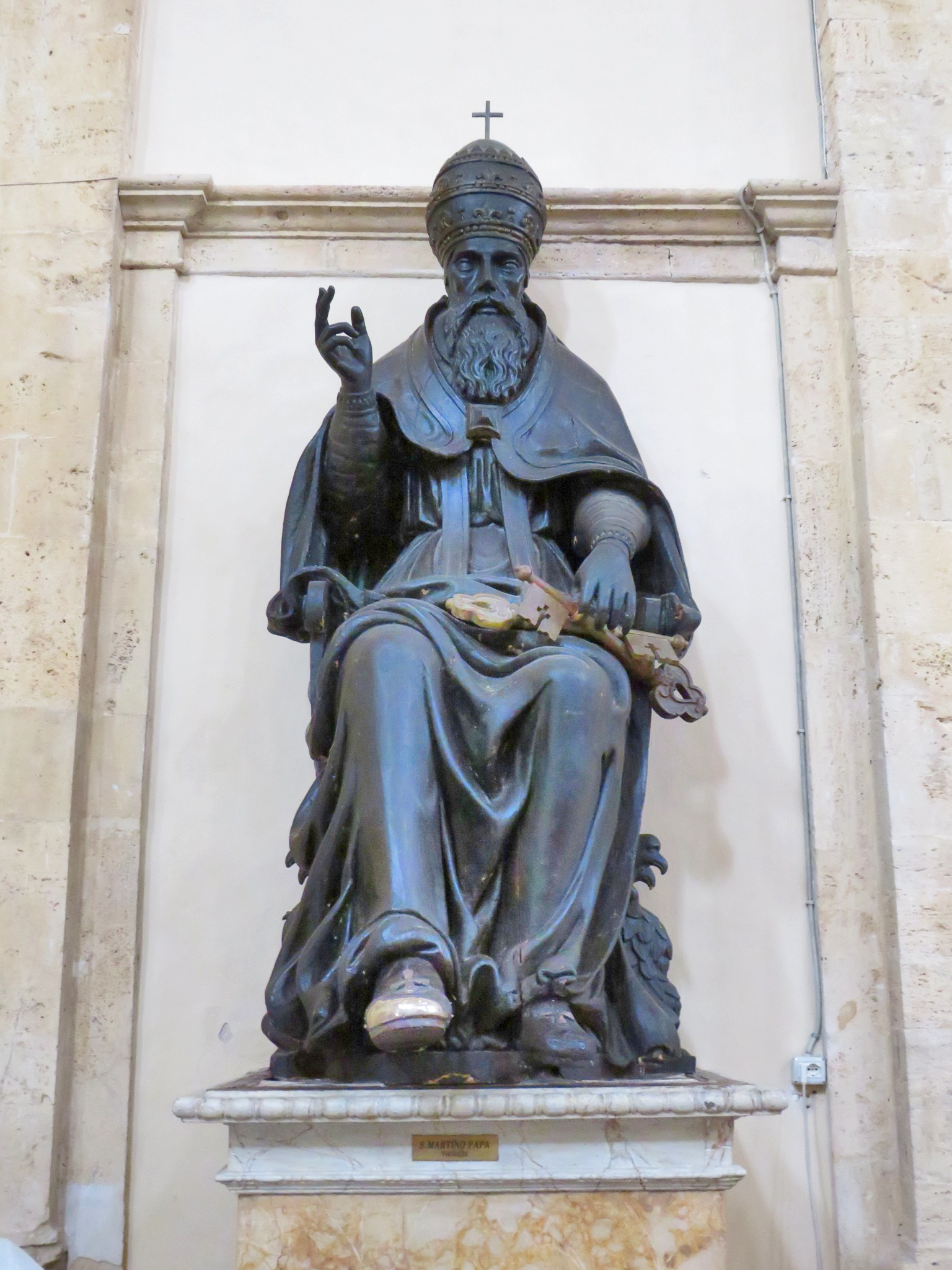
- Statue of Martin I in Santa Maria della Consolazione church, Todi, Italy
- Church: Catholic Church
- Papacy began: 5 July 649
- Papacy ended: 10 August 654
- Predecessor: Theodore I
- Successor: Eugene I

Personal details
- Born: 590–600 Near Todi, Umbria, Eastern Roman Empire
- Died: 16 September 655 Cherson, Eastern Roman Empire

Sainthood
- Feast day: Catholic Church, 13 April; Eastern Orthodox Church, 14 April (27 April on the Julian Calendar)
- Venerated in: Catholic Church; Eastern Orthodox Church

Pope Martin I (Latin: Martinus I, Greek: Πάπας Μαρτῖνος; between 590 and 600 – 16 September 655), also known as Martin the Confessor, was the bishop of Rome from 21 July 649 to 653 or 654. He had served as Pope Theodore I's ambassador to Constantinople, and was elected to succeed him as pope. He was the only pope when Constantinople controlled the papacy whose election had not awaited imperial mandate. For his strong opposition to Monothelitism, Pope Martin I was arrested by Emperor Constans II, carried off to Constantinople, and ultimately banished to Cherson. He is considered a saint by both the Catholic Church and the Eastern Orthodox Church, as well as the last pope recognised as a martyr.

== Early life and career ==
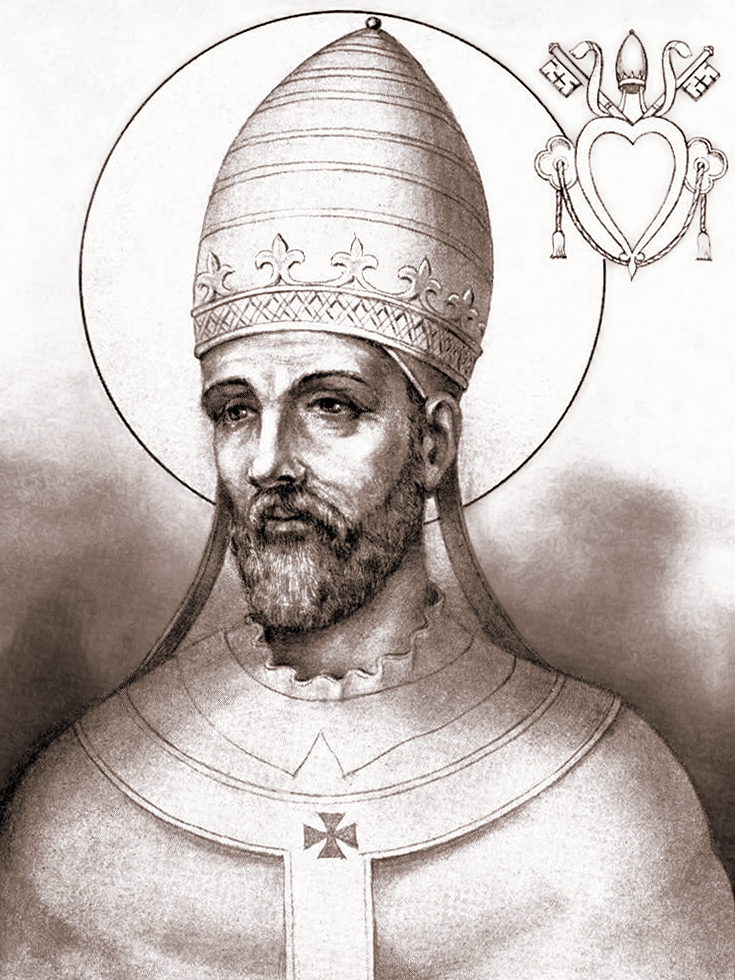
1842 illustration depicting Pope Martin I

Martin was born near Todi, Umbria, in the place now named after him: Pian di San Martino, close to Todi. According to his biographer Theodore, Martin was of noble birth, of commanding intelligence, and showed great charity to the poor.

Piazza states that Martin belonged to the order of St Basil. By 641, he was an abbot, and Pope John IV sent him to Dalmatia and Istria with large sums of money to alleviate the distress of the inhabitants, and redeem captives seized during the invasion of the Sclaveni (those parts mainly settled by Croats). As the ruined churches could not be rebuilt, the relics of some of the more important Dalmatian saints (Note: Mackie (1996) suggests two of these martyrs were the Salonitan bishops Venantius and Domnius.) were brought to Rome. John, himself from Dalmatia, then had them venerated by building the Chapel of St Venantius at the Lateran Baptistery. (Note: Incorporating an impressive sanctuary mosaic, the project was completed under Pope Theodore I. Carlo Rainaldi was commissioned by the Ceva Grimaldi family in 1674 to restore the chapel. Nowadays, after restoration in 1967, the interior is mostly in bare brick.) As Mackie suggests in her article, the St Venantius Chapel remains an important early example of a martyrium: a shrine specifically commissioned to venerate relics brought from afar. With regard to the martyr cult, (Note: The martyr cult offers insight into a significant chunk of early Christian belief and practice. Informing how many Christians viewed society and themselves in the early centuries of Christianity is the veneration of martyrs. In the Old Testament, Martyr Theology teaches that suffering and deaths by Jewish martyrs were examples to be imitated by fellow-Jews (2 Maccabees 6:30). In the New Testament, St Peter likewise taught in First Epistle of Peter 18–25 that Jesus died as an example. Prominent in both texts are the concepts of honour (see below), endurance, exemplary suffering, persecution and resolute trust in God. St Peter instructed Christians that if unjust suffering could be endured it would be imitating Christ's example. Were they to do so, they would receive a reward from God on the day of judgment. 2 Maccabees likewise taught that devout Jews enduring unjust suffering would receive honour from God after death. Within both these texts, the modern everyday use of honour fails adequately to convey the sense of being saved from condemnation (despite a life led imperfectly).) such structures represented the pinnacle of devotional building. They often became sites of pilgrimage.

Martin acted as apocrisiarius or legate ('nuncio') at Constantinople from the earliest years of Theodore I (642–49). He sent him as ambassador to Constantinople, seat of the empire (Note: The Roman Empire is also known as the Byzantine Empire (330–1204 and 1261–1453), and the Latin Empire (1204–1261). Its eastern domains, after 1453, became the Ottoman Empire until 1922.)in its eastern half. Albeit where the pope was based, Rome was by now second fiddle – economically, militarily and politically – to Constantinople. However, the eastern half of the Empire was suffering its own turbulence due to Arab expansion, Jerusalem's conquest in 637, and theological disputes having polarised Christians (the major religion of the empire). (Note: Harris (2020) portrays an inefficient imperial court in Constantinople. To offset weak defence on its Syria-Arabia frontier, the empire had for centuries "managed" the feuding Arab tribes by sponsoring the Christian Ghassanids and various compliant non-Christian Arabs. Held in check by the Ghassanids was the Sasanian's Lakhmid vassal-state. While Constantinople made it worth their while, the Ghassanids would remain loyal. By 630, Constantinople had ceased making the payments. There followed some defection to the Lakhmids. It seems some instalments may have resumed within six years, because the empire was able to draw on Ghassanid allies for the Battle of the Yarmuk. Constantinople's faltering strategy was symptomatic of internal malaise, fruit of religious sectarianism, factions jostling for the imperial succession, profligate finances, and territory again slipping away after the Byzantine–Sasanian War of 602–628.)

Being placed, for so much of Theodore's papacy, in charge of diplomacy between the Lateran patriarchate and the Byzantine court speaks of Martin's preeminence. It was as a deacon that he was elected to the papal throne after the pope died (13 May 649).

== Papacy (649 – 654) ==
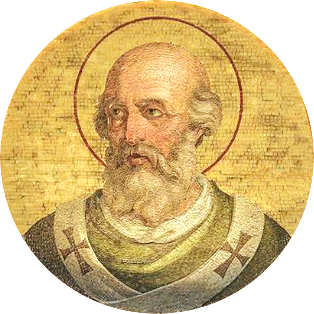
Tondo of Martin I at the Basilica of Saint Paul Outside the Walls

When Martin I was elected pope, the capital of the Eastern Roman Empire was Constantinople. (Note: To serve as the new capital of the Roman Empire in 324, the ancient city of Byzantium had been chosen. Its straddled the Bosporus strait and lay in both Europe and Asia. Its location, between the Golden Horn and the Sea of Marmara, minimised the need for defensive walls. The Emperor Constantine renamed the city Nova Roma, or 'New Rome'. It was again renamed Constantinople (city of Constantine) on 11 May 330, seven years before his death. The city was built intentionally to rival Rome. There then followed the economic and military collapse of the empire's western half, and with it Rome's importance, in the late 5th century. By the seventh century Constantinople was well established as the administrative and political capital of the whole empire. As the gateway between two continents (Europe and Asia), and between two seas (the Mediterranean and the Black Sea), prosperity was guaranteed. From the mid-5th century, it was the largest and wealthiest city in Europe, and remained so until the early 13th century. Its massive and complex ramparts were famous: the most sophisticated defensive architecture of its time. The Theodosian Walls consisted of a double wall, the second fortification lying about 2 km (1.2 mi) west of the first. In front was a moat with palisades. Constantinople's defenses proved impenetrable for nearly nine hundred years, despite being besieged by various armies on numerous occasions.) It sat amidst the eastern domains, where the most influential Church leader was the Ecumenical Patriarch of Constantinople who was also guardian of Christendom's holiest relics, such as the Crown of thorns and the True Cross. Martin's decisiveness from the start in bringing teaching prevalent in Constantinople into line with that elsewhere and hastening to heal fissures appearing within the Roman State Church brought him a high profile right from the start of his papacy. According to Piero Bargellini, he neither sought nor waited for the Byzantine emperor Constans II's consent to his election. To emphasise the point, it was without the customary imperial ratification that Martin had himself consecrated.

In the previous year, the emperor had published the Typos of Constans. This document defended the Monothelite thesis, ultimately decided to be heretical by the catholic church, according to which Christ had not in fact had a human will. To silence this and quell the confusion it caused, Pope Martin invited all the bishops of the West to a council within the first three months of his papacy. (Note: The Council did not achieve ecumenical status, but represented the first attempt of a pope to assemble an ecumenical council without it being headed by the emperor.) The Council met in the basilica of St. John Lateran in Rome and so was named the Lateran Council. It was attended by 105 bishops (chiefly from Italy, Sicily, and Sardinia, with some from Africa and other quarters). Over five sessions or secretarii from 5 to 31 October 649, resulting in twenty canons, the Council censured Monothelitism, its authors, the writings via which Monothelitism had spread and caused rifts within the Western Church, Constans' Typos and Patriarch Sergius's Ecthesis (an exposition of faith backed by Emperor Heraclius).

Imperial interference in matters theological had been soundly rejected. Condemnation of all Monothelite writings provoked an angry reaction from the Byzantine court. Unperturbed, Martin hastened to publish the Lateran Council decrees in an encyclical. Constans responded by getting his exarch in Italy to arrest the pope should he persist, and to send him as a prisoner to Constantinople. Constans also accused Martin of unauthorised contact and collaboration with the Muslims of the Rashidun Caliphate—allegations which he remained unable to convince the infuriated imperial authorities to drop.

The arrest orders could not be carried out for more than three years. On 17 June 653, Martin was arrested in the Lateran, along with Maximus the Confessor. He was hurried out of Rome and conveyed first to Naxos, Greece, and subsequently to Constantinople, where he arrived on 17 September 653. He was saved from execution by the pleas of Patriarch Paul II of Constantinople, who was himself gravely ill. Martin hoped that a new pope would not be elected while he lived but the imperial Byzantine government forced the Romans to find a successor. Eugene I was elected on 10 August 654, and Martin apparently acquiesced. Thus, as his successor is considered a valid pope, Martin's papacy ended at the latest on 10 August 654. After suffering an exhausting imprisonment and reportedly many public indignities, Martin was banished to Cherson, where he arrived on 15 May 655. He died there on 16 September.

== Legacy ==
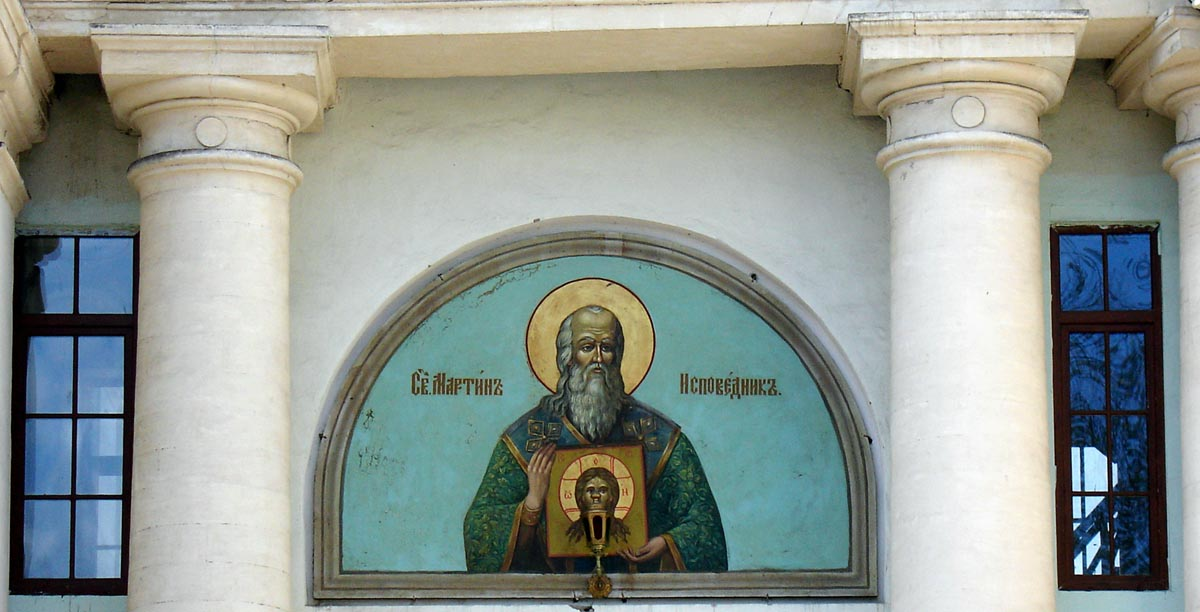
Portrayal at St. Martin the Confessor's Church in Moscow

A selection of documents recording the trial and exile of Pope Martin I was translated into Latin in Rome in the ninth century by Anastasius Bibliothecarius.

Since the 1969 revision of the General Roman Calendar, the memorial of Saint Martin I, which earlier versions of the calendar place on 12 November, is on 13 April, celebrated as the formal anniversary of his death. In the Byzantine-rite Churches, his feast day is 14 April (27 April New Style).

Pope Pius VII made an honourable reference to Martin in his 1800 encyclical Diu satis:

Indeed, the famous Martin who long ago won great praise for this See, commends faithfulness and fortitude to Us by his strengthening and defense of the truth and by the endurance of labors and pains. He was driven from his See and from the City, stripped of his rule, his rank, and his entire fortune. As soon as he arrived in any peaceful place, he was forced to move. Despite his advanced age and an illness which prevented his walking, he was banished to a remote land and repeatedly threatened with an even more painful exile. Without the assistance offered by the pious generosity of individuals, he would not have had food for himself and his few attendants.

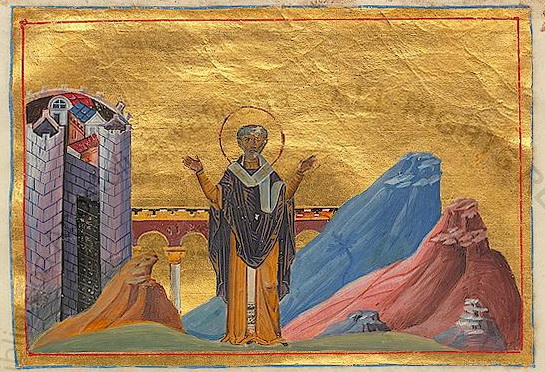
Miniature from the Menologion of Basil II

Although he was tempted daily in his weakened and lonely state, he never surrendered his integrity. No deceit could trick, no fear perturb, no promises conquer, no difficulties or dangers break him. His enemies could extract from him no sign which would not prove to all that Peter "until this time and forever lives in his successors and exercises judgment as is particularly clear in every age" as an excellent writer at the Council of Ephesus says.

The breviary of the Byzantine Churches states: "Glorious definer of the Orthodox Faith ... sacred chief of divine dogmas, unstained by error ... true reprover of heresy ... foundation of bishops, pillar of the Orthodox faith, teacher of religion. ... Thou didst adorn the divine see of Peter, and since from this divine Rock, thou didst immovably defend the Church, so now thou art glorified with him."

== Notes ==
Catholic Church titles
Preceded by Theodore I	Pope; 649–654	Succeeded by Eugene I
