= 640s =

Decade

The 640s decade ran from January 1, 640, to December 31, 649.

== Events ==
=== 640 ===
==== By place ====
====== Europe ======
- February 27 – Pepin the Elder, Mayor of the Palace of Austrasia, dies and is succeeded by his son Grimoald. He becomes the head of the Frankish household, and the most powerful man in the Frankish Kingdom (approximate date).
- King Chintila dies of natural causes after a 3-year reign, in which he permitted the bishops wide authority in Hispania, Septimania and Galicia. He is succeeded by his son Tulga, who becomes ruler of the Visigothic Kingdom (approximate date).
- At the request of Porga of Croatia, one of the first dukes or princes (Croatian: knez) of Dalmatian Croatia, the Byzantine emperor Heraclius sends Christian missionaries to the Croatian Provinces (approximate date).
- The French city of Lille (according to the legend) is founded by Lydéric. He kills Phinaert in a duel to avenge his parents' deaths (approximate date).

====== Britain ======
- King Eadbald of Kent dies after a 24-year reign. He is succeeded by his sons, Eorcenberht and Eormenred, who jointly rule the Kingdom of Kent (now south east England).
- Hartlepool Abbey in Northumbria (northern England) is founded. Wooden huts surrounding a church are built in Saxon style.

====== Africa ======
- May – Siege of Babylon Fortress: The Rashidun army lays siege to Babylon Fortress in the Nile Delta (near Cairo). The next two months' fighting remain inconclusive, the Byzantines having the upper hand by repulsing every Muslim assault.
- July 6 – Battle of Heliopolis: The Muslim Arab army (15,000 men) under Amr ibn al-As defeats the Byzantine forces near Heliopolis (Egypt). Amr divides his troops into three parts, surrounding the Byzantines.
- December 21 – Muslim Arabs capture Babylon after a seven-month siege; during a night assault Arab warriors open the city gates. The Thebaid region (Upper Egypt) is annexed by the Rashidun Caliphate.
- December 22 – On orders of the Saracen leader, Amar, the Serapeum of Alexandria, containing works that had survived the destruction of the Library of Alexandria, is burned down, along with its collection of 500,000 manuscripts. This story may be apocryphal.

====== Asia ======
Emperor Taizong's campaign against the Western Regions

- Emperor Taizong of Tang begins the military campaigns against the Western Regions states in the Tarim Basin. General Hou Junji captures the kingdom of Gaochang, to solidify Tang rule in Central Asia.
- Nestorian missionaries build the Daqin Pagoda in Chang'an (Shaanxi). Daqin is the name for the Roman Empire or the Near East.

==== By topic ====
====== Religion ======
- Disibod, Irish monk and hermit, arrives as a missionary in Francia. He begins his religious work in the Vosges and Ardennes.
- May 28 – Pope Severinus succeeds Honorius I as the 71st pope. He dies in Rome only two months after being consecrated.
- December 24 – Pope John IV succeeds Severinus as the 72nd pope. His election is accepted by the Exarchate of Ravenna.

====== Economy ======
- A surge in atmospheric lead in ice core drilled in the Colle Gnifetti Glacier in the Swiss Alps signals an increase in silver mining because of economic recovery, after natural disasters in 530s and 540s.

=== 641 ===
==== By place ====
====== Byzantine Empire ======
- February 11 – Emperor Heraclius, age 65, dies of dropsy at Constantinople after a 31-year reign. He reorganized the imperial administration, but lost Armenia, parts of Egypt, Palestine, Syria and Byzantine Mesopotamia to the Muslim Arabs. Heraclius is succeeded by his sons Constantine III and Heraklonas.
- The Muslim conquest of Egypt continues, with the siege of Alexandria.
- May – Constantine III, age 29, dies of tuberculosis after a four-month reign, leaving his half-brother Heraklonas sole emperor. Rumors spread that Constantine has been poisoned by Heraclius's second wife (and niece) Martina.
- September – The Byzantine Senate turns against Martina and her son Heraklonas, who are both mutilated, and exiled to Rhodes. Supported by general Valentinus, Constantine's son Constans II, age 10, succeeds to the throne.
- Constans II establishes a new civil-military defensive organisation, based upon geographical military districts. Byzantine forces maintain the frontier, along the line of the Taurus Mountains (Southern Turkey).

====== Europe ======
- Aega, Mayor of the Palace and regent (alongside of queen mother Nanthild) of Neustria and Burgundy, dies during the reign of King Clovis II. He is replaced by Erchinoald, a relative of Dagobert I's mother.
- The Lombards under King Rothari conquer Genoa (Liguria), and all remaining Byzantine territories in the lower Po Valley, including Oderzo (Opitergium).
- Arechis I, duke of Benevento (northeast of Naples), dies after a 50-year reign and is succeeded by his son Aiulf I.

====== Britain ======
- Prince Oswiu of Bernicia conquers Gododdin (or "The Old North") as far north as Manau (modern Scotland), on behalf of his half-brother, King Oswald (approximate date).
- King Bridei II dies after a 5-year reign, and is succeeded by his brother Talorc III as ruler of the Picts.

====== Africa ======
- November 8 – Siege of Alexandria: Muslim Arabs under 'Amr ibn al-'As capture Alexandria after a six-month siege. Byzantine officials formally capitulate to Amr, turning the city over to Arab hands.
- The city of Fustat (later Cairo) is founded in Egypt. It becomes the first capital of Egypt under Muslim rule.

====== Asia ======
- Emperor Taizong of the Tang dynasty (China) instigates a civil war in the Western Turkic Khaganate, by supporting Isbara Yabghu Qaghan.
- November 17 – Emperor Jomei of Japan, age 48, dies after a 12-year reign.
- Uija becomes the last king of the Korean kingdom of Baekje.

=== 642 ===
==== By place ====
====== Byzantine Empire ======
- Emperor Constans II marries Fausta.

====== Europe ======
- April 30 – Chindasuinth, a Gothic warlord (already 79 years old), commences a rebellion and deposes King Tulga in Toledo, Spain. He is proclaimed king by the Visigothic nobility and anointed by the bishops. Tulga is tonsured and sent out to live his days in a monastery.
- Radulf, a Frankish aristocrat, revolts against King Sigebert III of Austrasia and defeats his army, taking the title of rex or king of Thuringia.

====== Britain ======
- August 5 – Battle of Maserfield: King Penda of Mercia defeats and kills King Oswald of Northumbria, age 38, at Oswestry (West Midlands). He commands a united British and Mercian force, which includes the Welsh army of Kings Cadafael Cadomedd of Gwynedd and Cynddylan of Pengwern. The Mercians become dominant in the English Midlands.
- Oswiu succeeds his half-brother Oswald as king of Bernicia. He strengthens his position by marrying Eanflæd, daughter of King Edwin of Northumbria, then in exile in the Kingdom of Kent. This marriage takes place between 642 and 644.

====== Persia ======
- Battle of Nahāvand: The Rashidun army (30,000 men) under Sa`d ibn Abi Waqqas defeats the Persians at Nahāvand (modern Iran). The Persian cavalry, full of confidence, mounts an ill-prepared attack. The Arabs retreat to a safe area, where they outmanoeuvre and destroy the Persians in a narrow mountain valley.

====== Africa ======
- Battle of Dongola: 'Amr ibn al-'As sends an Arab expedition of 20,000 horsemen, under his cousin Uqba ibn Nafi, to Makuria (Southern Egypt). The Nubians strike hard against the Muslims near Dongola with hit-and-run attacks. The Arab incursions into Nubia are temporarily halted.

====== Asia ======
- Emperor Taizong of the Tang dynasty issues a decree throughout China, that increases the punishment for men who deliberately inflict injuries upon themselves (most commonly breaking their own legs) in order to avoid military conscription. This decree is an effort to eradicate this practice that has grown as a trend since the time of the rebellion against the Sui dynasty.
- Taizong supports a revolt by Turkic tribes against the rebellious Tu-lu Qaghan of the Western Turkic Khaganate.
- Empress Kōgyoku ascends to the throne of Japan, after her husband (and uncle) Emperor Jomei's death in 641.
- Winter – Yŏn Kaesomun seizes power over Goguryeo (Korea), and places King Bojang on the throne.

==== By topic ====
====== Arts and sciences ======
- The earliest surviving dated Arabic-language papyrus (PERF 558), found in Heracleopolis (Egypt), and the earliest known Arabic text with diacritical marks is written.

====== Architecture ======
- Arabs begin construction of the Mosque of Amr at Cairo, the first mosque built in Egypt and in all of Africa.

====== Religion ======
- October 12 – Pope John IV dies after a 2-year reign. He is succeeded by a Jerusalem-born cleric of Greek descent, Theodore I, as the 73rd pope of Rome.
- A monastic settlement is founded in Hampshire (England) which later becomes Winchester Cathedral.

=== 643 ===
==== By place ====
====== Byzantine Empire ======
- Emperor Constans II recognises Theodore Rshtuni as ruler of Armenia, after his successful campaign against the Muslims. He names him commander (nakharar) of the Armenian army.
- Maurikios names himself dux of Rome, and revolts against exarch Isaac (Exarchate of Ravenna). He declares Rome's independence from the Exarchate and from the Byzantine Empire.

====== Europe ======
- King Rothari of the Lombards issues the Edictum Rothari, which is the first codification of Lombard law (written in Latin). The edict guarantees rights only for Lombard subjects.
- Duke Leuthari II has Otto, mayor of the palace of Austrasia, murdered. He is succeeded by Grimoald the Elder, the eldest son of Pepin of Landen.

====== Britain ======
- King Cynegils of Wessex dies after a 32-year reign, and is succeeded by his son Cenwalh (who is still pagan); he marries the sister of King Penda of Mercia (approximate date).

====== Persia ======
- Peroz III, son of Yazdegerd III, the last Sassanid king of Persia, flees to territory under the control of the Tang dynasty in China (approximate date).

====== Africa ======
- Arab–Byzantine War: Arab armies continue their military expansion into North Africa and lay siege to Tripoli. The city is captured after one month.
- 'Amr ibn al-'As sends a detachment to Sabratha (modern Libya). The city puts up feeble resistance, but soon surrenders and agrees to pay Jizya.

====== Asia ======
- Chinese prefectural government officials travel to the capital of Chang'an, to give the annual report of the affairs in their districts. Emperor Taizong discovers that many have no proper quarters to rest in, and are renting rooms with merchants. Therefore, Taizong orders the government agencies in charge of municipal construction to build every visiting official his own private mansion in the capital.
- A Chinese embassy is sent to the North Indian Empire. They are invited by Emperor Harsha, who holds a Buddhist convocation at the capital Kannauj, which is attended by 20 kings and thousands of pilgrims.
- Taizong commissions artist Yan Liben to paint the life-size portraits of 24 government officials in the Lingyan Pavilion, to commemorate their service and contributions to the founding of the Tang dynasty.

==== By topic ====
====== Religion ======
- Æbbe establishes a monastery at Ebchester, known as Kirk Hill at St Abb's Head near Coldingham (Scotland).

=== 644 ===
==== By place ====
====== Asia ======
- Emperor Taizong of the Tang dynasty sends a Chinese expeditionary force, to invade and annex the Tarim Basin kingdom of Karasahr in Xinjiang, a vassal of the Western Turkic Khaganate. The oasis state is conquered, and Western Turks sent to assist Karasahr are defeated by the Tang forces.
- Zenkoji, a Buddhist temple and landmark spot in Nagano, Japan, is officially built by Empress Kogyoku.

====== Britain ======
- Oswine, son of the late king Osric of Deira, manages to establish himself as king of Deira (Northern England) despite armed objections from King Oswiu of Bernicia. His succession, probably the choice of the people of Deira, splits the Kingdom of Northumbria.

====== Byzantine Empire ======
- Valentinus, Byzantine general, attempts to usurp the throne of his son-in-law Constans II. He appears at the gates of Constantinople with a contingent of Byzantine troops, and demands to be crowned emperor. His claim is rejected, and Valentinus is lynched by the populace.

====== Islamic Empire ======
- November 3 – The second caliph Umar, r. 634–644, dies of wounds inflicted by the Persian slave Abu Lu'lu'a Firuz at Medina. On his death bed he appoints a committee to determine his successor. They select Uthman ibn Affan, who becomes the third caliph of the Rashidun Caliphate.

=== 645 ===
==== By place ====
====== Byzantine Empire ======
- Alexandria revolts against Arab rule, at the appearance of a Byzantine fleet of 300 ships, and Byzantine forces recapture the city. Abdullah ibn Sa'ad, Arab governor of Egypt, mounts an assault and retakes it. He begins building a Muslim fleet.

====== Europe ======
- Plato, exarch (imperial governor) of Ravenna, invades the southern Po Valley. The Lombards under King Rothari defeat him on the banks of the Panaro River (near Modena); 8,000 imperial troops are killed.

====== Britain ======
- King Cenwalh of Wessex is driven from his kingdom by his brother-in-law, King Penda of Mercia (according to Bede). He flees to the court of king Anna of East Anglia, and is baptised while in exile. Penda overruns Wessex.
- Gwynedd and much of Wales is in the grasp of famine. Would-be king Cadwaladr Fendigaid flees to Brittany. Civil war continues in his kingdom (approximate date).

====== Japan ======
- July 10 – Isshi Incident: Prince Naka-no-Ōe and Fujiwara no Kamatari assassinate Soga no Iruka, during a coup d'état at the imperial palace.
- Empress Kōgyoku is forced to abdicate the throne in favor of her younger brother Kōtoku, age 49, who becomes the 36th emperor of Japan.
- Naka-no-Ōe becomes crown prince and prime minister. Supporters of the semi-legendary regent Prince Shōtoku gain supremacy in Japan.
- Kōtoku creates a new city at Naniwa, and moves the capital from Yamato Province. The capital has a sea port, establishing foreign trade and diplomatic relations.
- Emperor Kōtoku establishes the Taika Reform: a land reform based on Confucian ideas and philosophies from China (approximate date)
- The first nengō, derived from the Chinese system of eras (nianhao) begins with the Taika era. ^{(Unclear significance. Needs more explanation as to why this belongs in the list of major events of the year)}

====== China ======
- May 1 – First conflict of the Goguryeo–Tang War: A Chinese expeditionary army under Emperor Taizong of Tang crosses the Liao River into Goguryeo (one of the Three kingdoms of Korea).
- July 18 – Tang forces under Li Shiji heading southeast toward the Yalu River put the strategic fortress of Ansi City (in the province of Liaoning) under siege.
- September – Taizong is unable to capture the Ansi fortress defended by Korean general Yang Manch'un. Food supplies running low, he withdraws his forces, ending the Siege of Ansi.
- October 13 – Emperor Taizong is compelled to order a withdrawal from Goguryeo.

==== By topic ====
====== Religion ======
- Xuanzang, Chinese Buddhist monk, returns to China after a 16-year pilgrimage to India. He is greeted with much honor by Emperor Taizong.
- The Giant Wild Goose Pagoda at Ci'en Temple, Xi'an (Shanxi) is first erected during the Tang dynasty (approximate date).

=== 646 ===
==== By place ====
====== Byzantine Empire ======
- Arab-Byzantine War: Alexandria is recaptured by the Muslim Arabs, after a Byzantine attempt (see 645) to retake Egypt fails, ending nearly 1,000 years of rule by Greco-Roman states in the city.
- Gregory the Patrician, Byzantine exarch of Africa, begins a rebellion against Constans II, and proclaims himself emperor; the revolt finds broad support among the populace.

====== Arabian Empire ======
- Caliph Uthman ibn Affan founds the city of Jeddah (Saudi Arabia) on the coast of the Red Sea. He establishes a port for Muslim pilgrims making the required Hajj to Mecca.

====== Africa ======
- Battle of Nikiou: The Rashidun army (15,000 men) under Amr ibn al-'As defeats a smaller Byzantine force, near the fortified town of Nikiou (Egypt).
- Amr ibn al-'As builds fortifications in Alexandria and quarters a strong garrison in the vicinity, which twice a year is relieved from Upper Egypt.

====== China ======
- Summer – Emperor Taizong of the Tang dynasty destroys the Xueyantuo state, during the campaign against the Xueyantuo (Central Asia).

====== Japan ======
- Emperor Kōtoku makes a decree about the policies of building tombs. He discontinues the old customs of sacrificing people in honor of a dead man, and forbids ill-considered rituals about purgation.
- A Great Reform edict changes Japan's political order. It will lead to the establishment of a centralized government with Kōtoku ruling from his palace, Naniwa Nagara-Toyosaki Palace, in Osaka.

==== By topic ====
====== Religion ======
- Xuanzang completes his book Great Tang Records on the Western Regions, which later becomes one of the primary sources for the study of medieval Central Asia and India.

=== 647 ===
==== By place ====
====== Byzantine Empire ======
- Arab–Byzantine War: An Arab army (20,000 men) under Abdullah ibn Sa'ad invades the Byzantine Exarchate of Africa. It conquers Tripolitania and the city of Sufetula, 150 miles (240 km) south of Carthage.
- Self-proclaimed emperor Gregory the Patrician is killed during the Arab invasion at Sufetula. Africa returns to imperial allegiance after his death, but the foundation of Byzantine rule is fatally undermined.

====== Asia ======
- Emperor Taizong of the Tang dynasty sends a Chinese mission to study Indian techniques of sugar manufacturing, at Bihar in the Ganges Valley.
- Taizong establishes a Chinese military government to pacify the former territory of Xueyantuo, which extends to the Altai Mountains in the west.
- Emperor Harsha, ruler of northern India, dies after a 41-year reign. His kingdom disintegrates into smaller states.
- Jindeok becomes queen of the Korean kingdom of Silla after the death of Queen Seondeok.

==== By topic ====
====== Astronomy and science ======
- A stone tower astronomical observatory (named Cheomseongdae) at Gyeongju is constructed in Silla (South Korea) around this time.

====== Religion ======
- Hilda of Whitby, age 33, is persuaded by Aidan, bishop of Lindisfarne, to enter the monastic life at Hartlepool Abbey (Northumbria).

=== 648 ===
==== By place ====
====== Byzantine Empire ======
- Emperor Constans II issues an imperial edict forbidding Monothelitism to be discussed, to quiet the intense controversy caused by the Monothelete doctrine. This edict, distributed by patriarch Paul II in Constans' name, is known as the Typos.

====== Europe ======
- King Sigebert III of Austrasia is advised by Remaclus to establish a double-monastery, at Stavelot and Malmedy. As a missionary bishop, he founds an abbey on the River Amblève (modern Belgium).

====== Britain ======
- King Cenwalh of Wessex returns from a 3-year exile in East Anglia, to reclaim his kingdom. He gives 3,000 hides of land around Ashdown to his nephew Cuthred, possibly sub-king of Berkshire (England).
- Cenwahl invites bishop Birinus to establish under his direction the Old Minster in Winchester. Together they have a small stone church built.

====== Asia ======
- Tang general Ashina She'er re-establishes Tang control of Karasahr, and leads a military campaign against the Tarim Basin kingdom of Kucha in Xinjiang, a vassal of the Western Turkic Khaganate.

====== Americas ======
- In an early skirmish in the run up to the Second Tikal–Calakmul War, Bʼalaj Chan Kʼawiil scores a military victory, apparently over his half-brother, who had galled him by using the same royal emblem (or emblem glyph) as he did.
- Dos Pilas breaks away from Tikal and becomes a vassal state of Calakmul.

==== By topic ====
====== Literature ======
- The Book of Jin is compiled in China during the Tang dynasty. Its chief editor is the chancellor Fang Xuanling, who dies in this year as well.

====== Religion ======
- Pope Theodore I excommunicates Paul II of Constantinople.

=== 649 ===
==== By place ====
====== Byzantine Empire ======
- Arab–Byzantine War: Arab naval forces under Abdullah ibn Saad conquer Cyprus, sacking the capital Constantia after a short siege, and looting the rest of the island. The Cypriots agree to pay the same revenue as they have done to Emperor Constans II.
- Constans II orders Olympius, exarch of the Exarchate of Ravenna, to arrest Pope Martin I on the ostensible grounds that the pope's election has not been submitted to the emperor for approval, but in fact because of the Lateran Council of 649's condemnation of Monothelitism and the Type of Constans. Olympius attempts to gain the support of the citizens of Rome and the bishops, with little success, and perhaps considers the assassination of the Pope.

====== Europe ======
- January – Chindasuinth, at the urging of bishop Braulio of Zaragoza, confirms his son Recceswinth as co-ruler of the Visigothic Kingdom.

====== Arabian Empire ======
- Muawiyah ibn Abi Sufyan, governor of Syria, develops an Arab navy in the Levant and uses it to confront the Byzantine Empire in the Aegean Sea. It is manned by Monophysitise Christian, Coptic and Syrian Christian sailors.

====== China ======
- January 19 – The Tang campaign against Kucha ends after the forces of Kucha surrender, following a 40-day siege led by general Ashina She'er, establishing Chinese control over the northern Tarim Basin (Xinjiang).
- June 16 – General Wang Xuance commands a combined Chinese, Nepalese, and Tibetan expedition into India. He ends up winning the battle and acquiring a Buddhist relic.
- July 10 – Emperor Taizong dies after a 23-year reign, in which he has restored the civil administration in China. He is succeeded by his son Gaozong, age 20, who becomes ruler of the Tang dynasty.

====== Japan ======
- Emperor Kōtoku has Soga no Kurayamada accused of treason. He strangles himself at the temple of Yamada-dera. Other relatives of the Soga clan are captured and executed.

==== By topic ====
====== Religion ======
- May 14 – Pope Theodore I dies after a 7-year reign, in which he has shown generosity to the poor. He is succeeded on July 5 by Martin I as the 74th pope.
- October 5 – The Lateran Council of 649, summoned by Theodore and carried forward by Martin, opens. It strongly condemns Monothelitism and the Type of Constans.

== Births ==
640

- Al-Akhtal, Arab poet (approximate date)
- Arikesari Maravarman, king of the Pandyan Empire (approximate date)
- Asparuh, ruler of the Bulgarian Empire (approximate date)
- Godeberta, Frankish abbess (approximate date)
- Isonokami no Maro, Japanese statesman (d. 717)
- Kilian, Irish bishop (approximate date)
- Luo Binwang, Chinese poet (d. 684)
- Musa ibn Nusayr, Arab general (d. 716)
- Winnoc, Welsh abbot (approximate date)
- Wulfhere, king of Mercia (approximate date)
- Wulfram, archbishop of Sens (approximate date)

641

- Asparukh, ruler (khan) of the First Bulgarian Empire (d. 701)

642

- Ceolfrith, Anglo-Saxon abbot (approximate date)
- Hasan al-Basri, Arab theologian (d. 728)
- Julian, archbishop of Toledo (d. 690)
- Máel Ruba, Irish abbot (d. 722)
- Mujahid ibn Jabr, Muslim scholar (or 645)

643

- Fazang, Chinese Buddhist patriarch (d. 712)
- Li Zhong, prince of the Tang dynasty (d. 665)

644

- K'inich K'an Joy Chitam II, ruler of Palenque
- Li Jiao, chancellor of the Tang dynasty (d. 713)

645

- Æthelred, king of Mercia (approximate date)
- Ecgfrith, king of Northumbria (approximate date)
- Jitō, empress of Japan (d. 703)
- John of Damascus, Syrian church father (or 676)
- Mujahid ibn Jabr, Arabic scholar (or 642)
- Yazid I, Muslim Caliph (d. 683)

646

- Abd al-Malik ibn Marwan, Muslim Caliph (d. 705)
- Gudula, Frankish saint
- Li Sujie, prince of the Tang dynasty (d. 690)
- Sun Guoting, Chinese calligrapher (d. 691)
- Tonyukuk, military leader of the Göktürks (approximate date)

647

- Al-Abbas ibn Ali, Muslim martyr (d. 680)
- Itzamnaaj B'alam II, ruler of Yaxchilan (d. 742)

648

- Kōbun, emperor of Japan (d. 672)
- Radbod, king of Frisia (d. 719)
- Tōchi, Japanese princess (d. 678)

649

- Approximate date – Wang Bo, Chinese poet (d. 676)
- Xue Ne, Chinese general and chancellor of the Tang dynasty (d. 720)

== Deaths ==
640

- February 27 – Pepin the Elder, Mayor of the Palace
- August 2 – Pope Severinus
- September 12 – Sak Kʼukʼ, queen of Palenque
- Alena, Frankish martyr (approximate date)
- Aretion, Byzantine governor of Jerusalem
- Arnulf of Metz, Frankish bishop and saint
- Bilal ibn Rabah, companion of Muhammad
- Chintila, king of the Visigoths (approximate date)
- Dushun, (Chinese Buddhist) patriarch (b. 557)
- Eadbald, king of Kent (approximate date)
- Eanswith, Anglo-Saxon princess (approximate date)
- John, Byzantine duke of Barca
- Li Xiaogong, prince of the Tang dynasty (b. 591)
- Romanus, bishop of Rouen (approximate date)
- Tysilio, Welsh prince and bishop
- Yazid ibn Abi Sufyan, Arab general

641

- February 11 – Heraclius, Byzantine emperor
- November 17 – Emperor Jomei of Japan (b. 593)
- Aega, Mayor of the Palace (Neustria and Burgundy)
- Arechis I, duke of Benevento (Italy)
- Bridei II, king of the Picts
- Emperor Constantine III of the Byzantine Empire
- Mu, king of Baekje (one of the Three Kingdoms of Korea)
- Ouyang Xun, Confucian scholar and calligrapher (b. 557)
- Zaynab bint Jahsh, wife of Muhammad

642

- March 21 – Cyrus of Alexandria, Patriarch of Alexandria and governor of Egypt
- August 5 or 641 – Oswald, king of Northumbria
- October 12 – Pope John IV
- Emma, Anglo-Saxon queen
- Eowa, king of Mercia (English Midlands)
- Domnall Brecc, king of Dál Riata
- Domnall mac Áedo, high king of Ireland
- Flaochad, Mayor of the Palace (Burgundy)
- Heraklonas, Byzantine emperor (approximate date)
- Khalid ibn al-Walid, Arab general (b. 592)
- Mardanshah, Persian general
- Nanthild, Frankish queen
- Pulakeshin II, king of Chalukya (India)
- Willibad, patrician (of duke) of Burgundy
- Yeongnyu, king of Goguryeo (Korea)
- Yuwen Shiji, chancellor of the Tang dynasty

643

- April 29 – Hou Junji, chancellor of the Tang dynasty
- September 19 – Goeric, bishop of Metz
- Cynegils, king of Wessex (approximate date)
- Maurikios Chartoularios, Byzantine rebel leader
- Otto, mayor of the palace (Austrasia)
- Wei Zheng, chancellor of the Tang dynasty (b. 580)

644

- January 17 – Sulpitius the Pious, French bishop and saint
- October 10 – Paulinus, Archbishop of York
- Otto, mayor of the palace (Austrasia)
- Radulf, king of Thuringia (approximate date)
- Trudpert, Irish missionary (or 607)
- Abu Lu'lu'a Firuz, assassin of Umar I
- Umar I, Muslim caliph (r. 634–644)
- Valentinus, Byzantine general and usurper

645

- April 26 – Richarius, Frankish hermit and monk
- July 10 – Soga no Iruka, statesman of Japan
- October 21 – Zhenzhu Khan, khan of Xueyantuo
- unknown dates
  - Al-Khansa, Arabic poet (b. 575)
  - Cen Wenben, chancellor and editor of the Book of Zhou (b. 595)
  - Li Chengqian, crown prince of the Tang dynasty
  - Soga no Emishi, statesman of Japan (b. 587)
  - Yan Shigu, Chinese author of the Tang dynasty (b. 581)

646

- January 17 – Sulpitius the Pious, bishop of Bourges
- January 19 – Liu Ji, chancellor of the Tang dynasty
- unknown dates
  - Gallus, Irish missionary (approximate date)
  - Manuel, Armenian eunuch and general
  - Zhang Liang, general of the Tang dynasty

647

- Æthelburh of Kent, queen of Northumbria
- Felix of Burgundy, bishop of Dunwich (or 648)
- Gao Shilian, chancellor of the Tang dynasty (b. 576)
- Gregory the Patrician, Exarch of Africa
- Harsha, emperor of Harsha (India)
- Li Baiyao, Chinese official and historian (b. 564)
- Seondeok, queen of Silla (Korea)
- Xiao Yu, prince of the Liang dynasty (b. 574)
- Yang Shidao, chancellor of the Tang dynasty

648

- Fang Xuanling, chancellor of the Tang dynasty (b. 579)
- John III of the Sedre, Syriac Orthodox Patriarch of Antioch.
- Ma Zhou, chancellor of the Tang dynasty (b. 601)
- Xiao, empress of the Sui dynasty

649

- March – John Climacus, Syrian monk and writer (b. c.579)
- May 2 – Marutha of Tikrit, Persian theologian and Maphrian of the Syriac Orthodox Church (b. 565)
- May 14 – Pope Theodore I, Jerusalem-born Greek pontiff
- July 2 – Li Jing, Chinese general and chancellor of the Tang dynasty (b. 571)
- July 6 – Goar of Aquitaine, Catholic priest and hermit (b. c.585)
- July 10 – Taizong, Chinese Tang dynasty emperor (b. 598)
- December 3 – Birinus, French-born Bishop of Dorchester in Wessex (b. c.600)
- Rogallach mac Uatach, Irish king of Connacht (murdered)
- Soga no Kurayamada, Japanese udaijin
- Songtsen Gampo, founder of the Tibetan Empire
