= 643 =

Calendar year

643 in various calendars
Gregorian calendar	643; DCXLIII
Ab urbe condita	1396
Armenian calendar	92; ԹՎ ՂԲ
Assyrian calendar	5393
Balinese saka calendar	564–565
Bengali calendar	49–50
Berber calendar	1593
Buddhist calendar	1187
Burmese calendar	5
Byzantine calendar	6151–6152
Chinese calendar	壬寅年 (Water Tiger); 3340 or 3133 — to — 癸卯年 (Water Rabbit); 3341 or 3134
Coptic calendar	359–360
Discordian calendar	1809
Ethiopian calendar	635–636
Hebrew calendar	4403–4404
- Hindu calendars
Vikram Samvat	699–700
Shaka Samvat	564–565
Kali Yuga	3743–3744
Holocene calendar	10643
Iranian calendar	21–22
Islamic calendar	22–23
Japanese calendar	N/A
Javanese calendar	533–535
Julian calendar	643; DCXLIII
Korean calendar	2976
Minguo calendar	1269 before ROC 民前1269年
Nanakshahi calendar	−825
Seleucid era	954/955 AG
Thai solar calendar	1185–1186
Tibetan calendar	ཆུ་ཕོ་སྟག་ལོ་ (male Water-Tiger); 769 or 388 or −384 — to — ཆུ་མོ་ཡོས་ལོ་ (female Water-Hare); 770 or 389 or −383

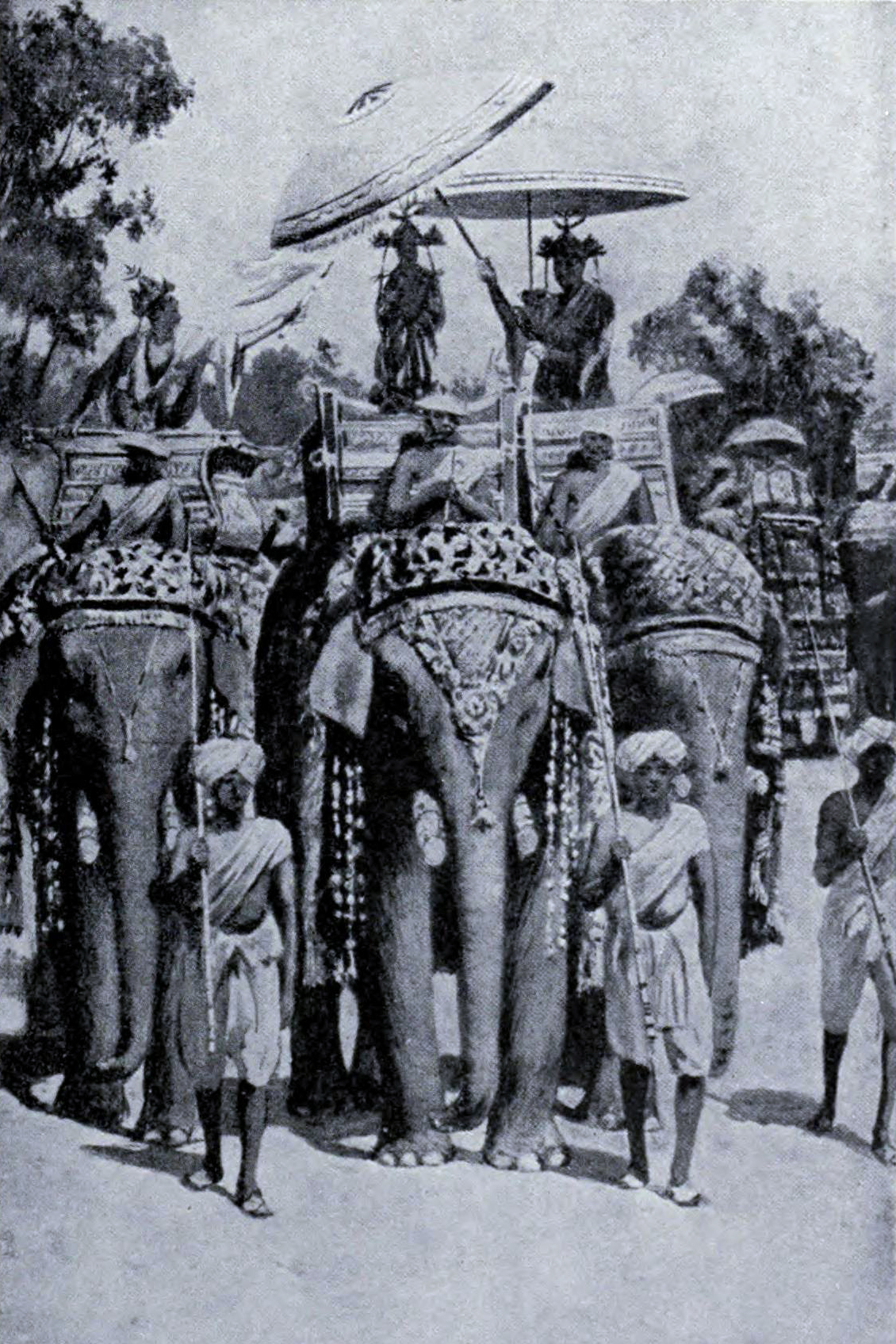
Emperor Harsha pays homage to Buddha

Year 643 (DCXLIII) was a common year starting on Wednesday of the Julian calendar. The denomination 643 for this year has been used since the early medieval period, when the Anno Domini calendar era became the prevalent method in Europe for naming years.

== Events ==
=== By place ===
==== Byzantine Empire ====
- Emperor Constans II recognises Theodore Rshtuni as ruler of Armenia, after his successful campaign against the Muslims. He names him commander (nakharar) of the Armenian army.
- Maurikios names himself dux of Rome, and revolts against exarch Isaac (Exarchate of Ravenna). He declares Rome's independence from the Exarchate and from the Byzantine Empire.

==== Europe ====
- King Rothari of the Lombards issues the Edictum Rothari, which is the first codification of Lombard law (written in Latin). The edict guarantees rights only for Lombard subjects.
- Duke Leuthari II has Otto, mayor of the palace of Austrasia, murdered. He is succeeded by Grimoald the Elder, the eldest son of Pepin of Landen.

==== Britain ====
- King Cynegils of Wessex dies after a 32-year reign, and is succeeded by his son Cenwalh (who is still pagan); he marries the sister of King Penda of Mercia (approximate date).

==== Persia ====
- Peroz III, son of Yazdegerd III, the last Sassanid king of Persia, flees to territory under the control of the Tang dynasty in China (approximate date).

==== Africa ====
- Arab–Byzantine War: Arab armies continue their military expansion into North Africa and lay siege to Tripoli. The city is captured after one month.
- 'Amr ibn al-'As sends a detachment to Sabratha (modern Libya). The city puts up feeble resistance, but soon surrenders and agrees to pay Jizya.

==== Asia ====
- Chinese prefectural government officials travel to the capital of Chang'an, to give the annual report of the affairs in their districts. Emperor Taizong discovers that many have no proper quarters to rest in, and are renting rooms with merchants. Therefore, Taizong orders the government agencies in charge of municipal construction to build every visiting official his own private mansion in the capital.
- A Chinese embassy is sent to the North Indian Empire. They are invited by Emperor Harsha, who holds a Buddhist convocation at the capital Kannauj, which is attended by 20 kings and thousands of pilgrims.
- Taizong commissions artist Yan Liben to paint the life-size portraits of 24 government officials in the Lingyan Pavilion, to commemorate their service and contributions to the founding of the Tang dynasty.

=== By topic ===
==== Religion ====
- Æbbe establishes a monastery at Ebchester, known as Kirk Hill at St Abb's Head near Coldingham (Scotland).

== Births ==
- Fazang, Chinese Buddhist patriarch (d. 712)
- Li Zhong, prince of the Tang dynasty (d. 665)

== Deaths ==
- April 29 – Hou Junji, chancellor of the Tang dynasty
- September 19 – Goeric, bishop of Metz
- Cynegils, king of Wessex (approximate date)
- Maurikios Chartoularios, Byzantine rebel leader
- Otto, mayor of the palace (Austrasia)
- Wei Zheng, chancellor of the Tang dynasty (b. 580)
