= 638 =

Calendar year

638 in various calendars
- Gregorian calendar: 638; DCXXXVIII
- Ab urbe condita: 1391
- Armenian calendar: 87; ԹՎ ՁԷ
- Assyrian calendar: 5388
- Balinese saka calendar: 559–560
- Bengali calendar: 44–45
- Berber calendar: 1588
- Buddhist calendar: 1182
- Burmese calendar: 0
- Byzantine calendar: 6146–6147
- Chinese calendar: 丁酉年 (Fire Rooster); 3335 or 3128 — to — 戊戌年 (Earth Dog); 3336 or 3129
- Coptic calendar: 354–355
- Discordian calendar: 1804
- Ethiopian calendar: 630–631
- Hebrew calendar: 4398–4399
- Hindu calendars
- Vikram Samvat: 694–695
- Shaka Samvat: 559–560
- Kali Yuga: 3738–3739
- Holocene calendar: 10638
- Iranian calendar: 16–17
- Islamic calendar: 16–17
- Japanese calendar: N/A
- Javanese calendar: 528–529
- Julian calendar: 638; DCXXXVIII
- Korean calendar: 2971
- Minguo calendar: 1274 before ROC 民前1274年
- Nanakshahi calendar: −830
- Seleucid era: 949/950 AG
- Thai solar calendar: 1180–1181
- Tibetan calendar: མེ་མོ་བྱ་ལོ་ (female Fire-Bird); 764 or 383 or −389 — to — ས་ཕོ་ཁྱི་ལོ་ (male Earth-Dog); 765 or 384 or −388

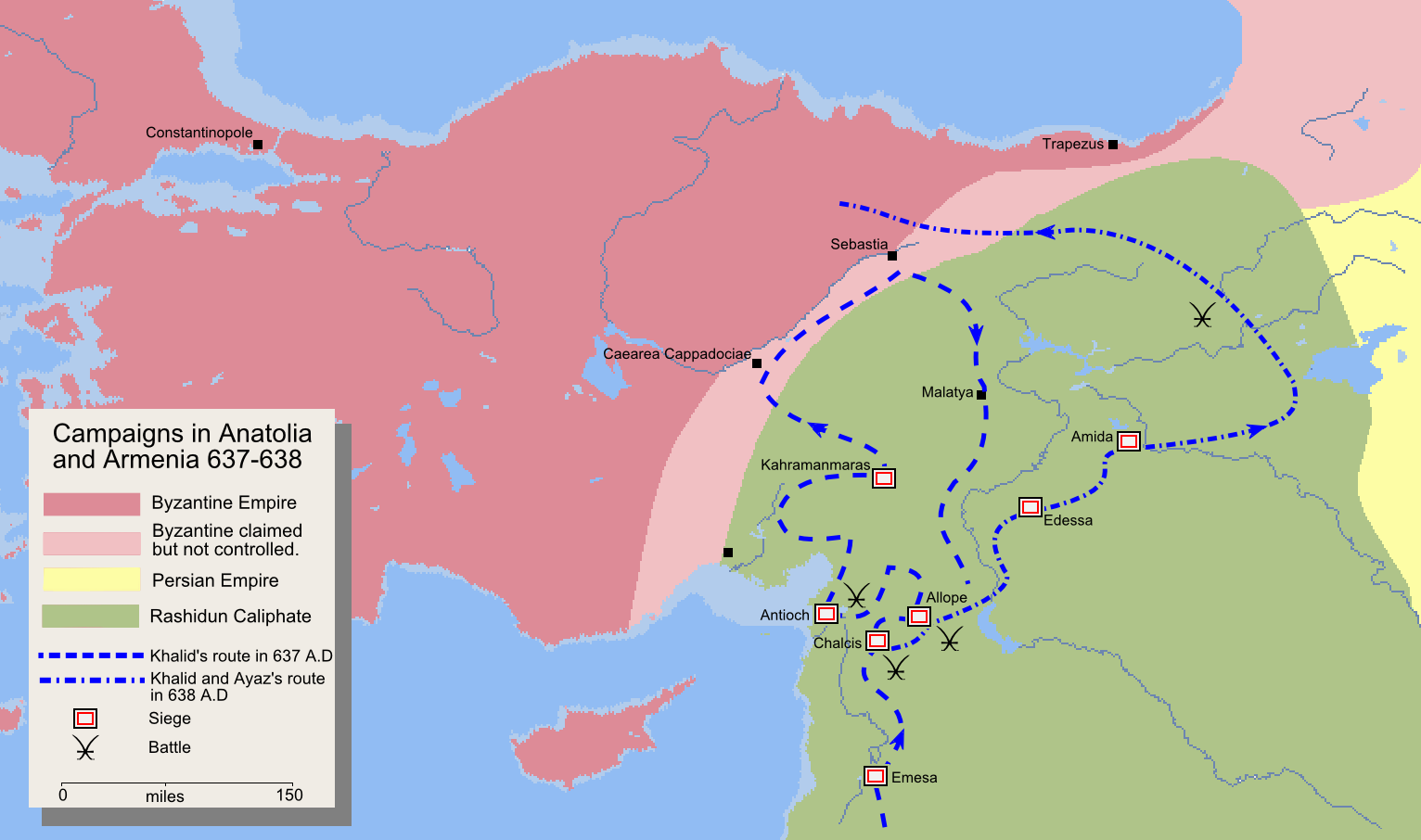
The Muslim invasion of Anatolia and Armenia

Year 638 (DCXXXVIII) was a common year starting on Thursday of the Julian calendar. The denomination 638 for this year has been used since the early medieval period, when the Anno Domini calendar era became the prevalent method in Europe for naming years.

== Events ==
=== By place ===
==== Byzantine Empire ====
- Emperor Heraclius creates a buffer zone (or no man's land) in the heartland of Asia Minor. In the mountainous terrain of Anatolia, the Byzantine forces develop a system of defensive guerrilla warfare. The strategy is known as ‘shadowing warfare’, as it avoids battle with major Muslim invaders, and instead attacks raiding parties on their return when they are laden with booty, captured livestock or prisoners.
- July 4 – Heraklonas, age 12, son of Heraclius, obtains (through the influence of his mother Martina) the title of Augustus. This brings him in rivalry with his elder half-brother Constantine.
- Heraclius issues his Ekthesis, espousing the Monothelete doctrine (that there is only one will in Christ), and setting it forth as the official doctrine of the Eastern Orthodox Church. The Ekthesis is vigorously opposed, notably by Maximus the Confessor.

==== Britain ====
- King Oswald and his Northumbrian army besiege and conquer Edinburgh (Scotland). His half-brother, Oswiu of Bernicia, marries Princess Rhiainfelt, heiress of North Rheged ("Old North"). Northumbria embraces North Rheged in a peaceful takeover, and Oswiu becomes a sub-king (approximate date).

==== Arabian Empire ====
- January – The Plague of Amwas breaks out.
- Autumn – The Arabian forces under Abu Ubaidah ibn al-Jarrah storm Caesarea Maritima, capital of Byzantine Palestine, and effect their final capture of Ascalon (modern Israel). Caliph Umar I stops the Muslim invasion, and appoints Abu Ubaidah governor of Syria.
- Arab-Byzantine War: The invading Rashidun army under Khalid ibn al-Walid moves into Anatolia, conquering (without strong Byzantine resistance) the cities of Kahramanmaraş, Caesarea Cappadociae, Sebastia, and Malatya (west of the Taurus Mountains). Arab forces march into Armenia, where they capture the cities Edessa and Amida up to the Ararat plain.
- Umar I dismisses Khalid ibn al-Walid after the conquest of Syria, owing to his ever-growing fame and influence. He wants the Muslims to know that victory comes from God, not his general.
- Abu Musa al-Asha'ari, companion (sahabah) of Muhammad, establishes Hafar al-Batin, located in the northeastern region of the Arabian Peninsula. He orders the digging for new wells, along this desert route that Muslims travel from Iraq to Mecca for the Hajj (pilgrimage).

==== Asia ====
- The Tibetan Empire, seeking an alliance through marriage with Tang dynasty China, launches an attack on Songzhou that is repelled by Chinese forces, but is followed by the marriage of the Chinese Princess Wencheng to Tibetan ruler Songtsän Gampo.

=== By topic ===
==== Arts and sciences ====
- The Islamic calendar is introduced by Abu Musa al-Asha'ari. He convinces Umar I to make notes of an era for Muslims.
- March 22 – Year 0 of the Burmese calendar, based on the Chula Sakarat, is also used in the mainland of Southeast Asia.

==== Religion ====
- October 12 – Pope Honorius I dies at Rome after a 13-year reign, and is succeeded by Severinus, but the Byzantine emperor Heraclius will delay the new pope's consecration until May 640.
- December 20 – Pyrrhus I becomes patriarch of Constantinople, after the death of Sergius I. He has been an advocate of Monothelitism and a close friend of Heraclius.

== Births ==
- Huineng, Chinese Zen Buddhist patriarch of the Tang dynasty (d. 713)

== Deaths ==
- March 11 – Sophronius, patriarch of Jerusalem
- October 12 – Pope Honorius I
- December 9 – Sergius I, patriarch of Constantinople
- Qin Shubao, general of the Tang dynasty
- Yu Shinan, calligrapher and official (b. 558)
