= Leuthard II =

Leuthard II may refer to:

- Leuthari II (fl. c. 643), Duke of Alamannia
- Leuthard II of Paris (born c. 806, died 858 or 869), seventh Count of Paris
