= 770 =

Calendar year

770 in various calendars
Gregorian calendar	770; DCCLXX
Ab urbe condita	1523
Armenian calendar	219; ԹՎ ՄԺԹ
Assyrian calendar	5520
Balinese saka calendar	691–692
Bengali calendar	176–177
Berber calendar	1720
Buddhist calendar	1314
Burmese calendar	132
Byzantine calendar	6278–6279
Chinese calendar	己酉年 (Earth Rooster); 3467 or 3260 — to — 庚戌年 (Metal Dog); 3468 or 3261
Coptic calendar	486–487
Discordian calendar	1936
Ethiopian calendar	762–763
Hebrew calendar	4530–4531
- Hindu calendars
Vikram Samvat	826–827
Shaka Samvat	691–692
Kali Yuga	3870–3871
Holocene calendar	10770
Iranian calendar	148–149
Islamic calendar	152–154
Japanese calendar	Jingo-keiun 4 / Hōki 1 (宝亀元年)
Javanese calendar	664–665
Julian calendar	770; DCCLXX
Korean calendar	3103
Minguo calendar	1142 before ROC 民前1142年
Nanakshahi calendar	−698
Seleucid era	1081/1082 AG
Thai solar calendar	1312–1313
Tibetan calendar	ས་མོ་བྱ་ལོ་ (female Earth-Bird); 896 or 515 or −257 — to — ལྕགས་ཕོ་ཁྱི་ལོ་ (male Iron-Dog); 897 or 516 or −256

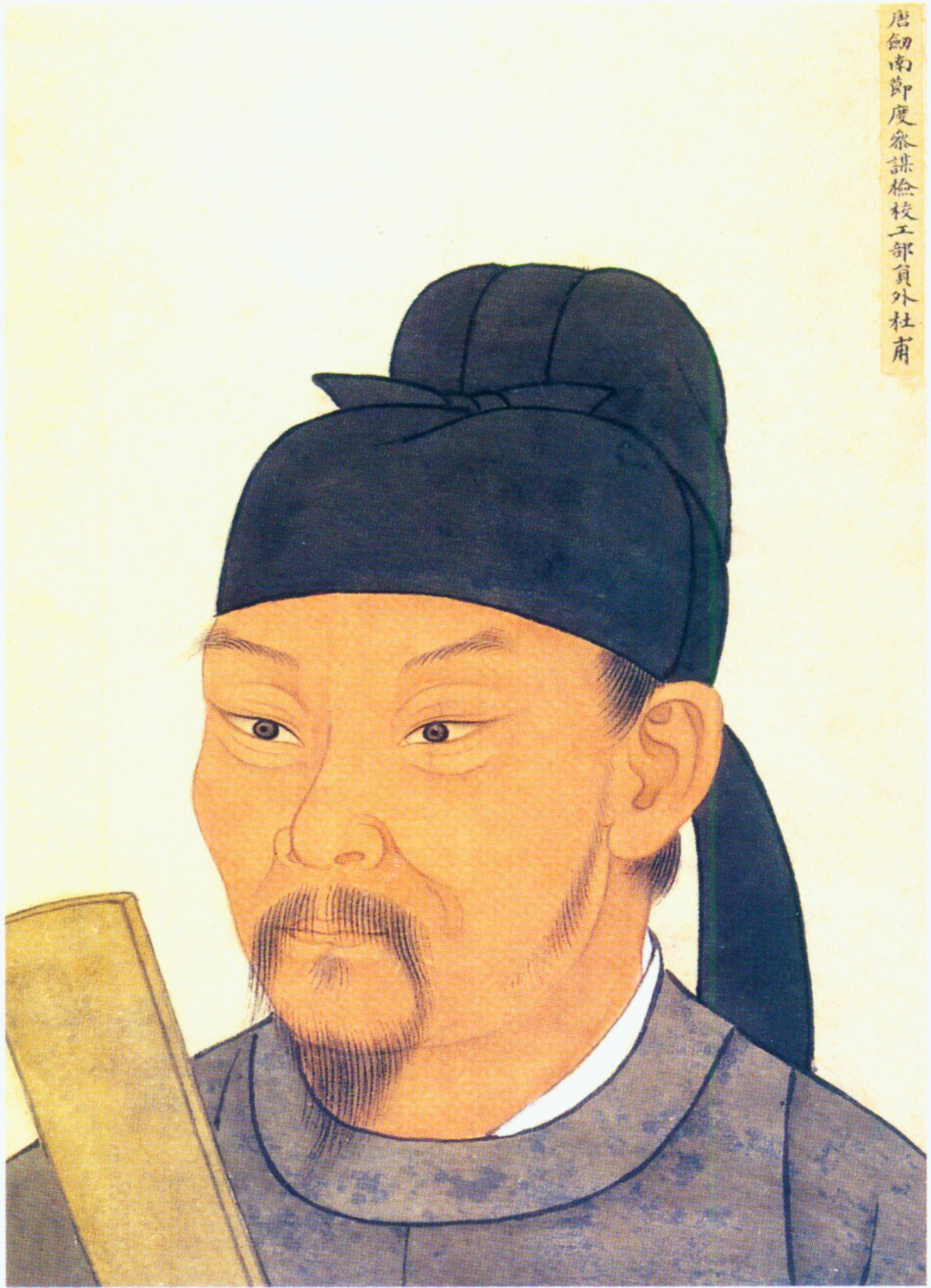
Portrait of Du Fu (712–770)

Year 770 (DCCLXX) was a common year starting on Monday of the Julian calendar. The denomination 770 for this year has been used since the early medieval period, when the Anno Domini calendar era became the prevalent method in Europe for naming years.

== Events ==
=== By place ===
==== Europe ====
- King Charlemagne signs a peace treaty with Duke Tassilo III of Bavaria, and marries the Lombard princess Desiderata (daughter of King Desiderius). He travels to the Lombard court at Pavia to conclude arrangements. Pope Stephen III opposes the marriage, and protests about a Frankish-Lombard alliance.
- Hedeby, an important trading settlement, in the Danish-northern German borderland is founded (approximate date).

==== Britain ====
- King Alhred of Northumbria takes an interest in continental missionary activities, and sends Willehad to Frisia in modern-day Netherlands (approximate date).

==== Abbasid Caliphate ====
- Caliph al-Mansur orders the closing of the Canal of the Pharaohs (Egypt). The only remaining land routes to transship camel caravans' goods are from Alexandria to ports on the Red Sea, or the northern Byzantine termini of the Silk Road.

==== Asia ====
- August 28 – Empress Kōken (also Shōtoku) of Japan dies.

== Births ==
- Ansegisus, Frankish abbot (approximate date)
- Jayavarman II, founder of the Khmer Empire (d. 835)
- Michael I, emperor of the Byzantine Empire (d. 844)
- Michael II, emperor of the Byzantine Empire (d. 829)
- Pepin of Italy, son of Charlemagne (or 773)
- Prokopia, empress of the Byzantine Empire (approximate date)
- Stephen IV, pope of the Catholic Church (approximate date)
- Sugawara no Kiyotomo, Japanese nobleman (d. 842)

== Deaths ==
- August 28 – Kōken, empress of Japan (b. 718)
- Cennselach mac Brain, king of the Uí Ceinnselaig (Ireland)
- Du Fu, Chinese poet (b. 712)
- Ma'n ibn Za'ida al-Shaybani, Arab general (or 769)
- Modestus, Irish missionary (approximate date)
- Opportuna of Montreuil, Frankish abbess
- Tóim Snáma mac Flainn, king of Osraige (Ireland)
