= St Mary and St Eanswythe's Church, Folkestone =

St Mary and St Eanswythe’s Church, Folkestone
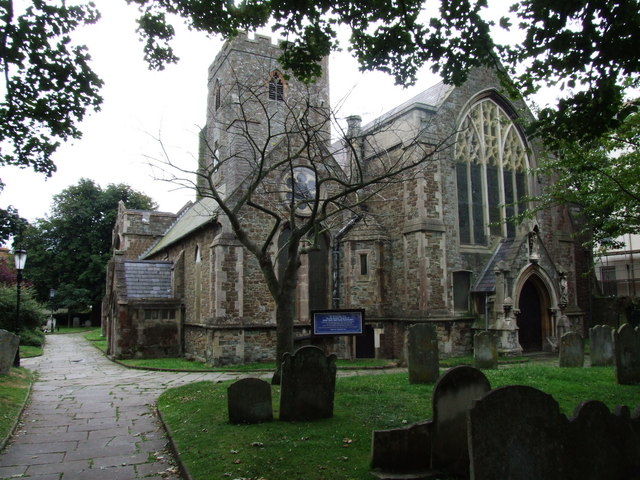
- View from the west
- St Mary and St Eanswythe’s Church, Folkestone
- 51°4′46″N 1°10′54″E
- OS grid reference: TR 229 359
- Location: Folkestone
- Country: England
- Denomination: Church of England
- Website: http://stmaryandsteanswythe.org/

Architecture
- Heritage designation: Grade II*
- Designated: 5 December 1949

Administration
- Diocese: Diocese of Canterbury
- Deanery: Elham Deanery

St Mary and St Eanswythe's Church is a Grade II* listed Anglican church in Folkestone, Kent, situated not far from cliffs overlooking the English Channel. Parts of the building date from the 13th century, but it was largely rebuilt in the 19th century. It is unusual in having a central tower.

== St Eanswythe ==
St Eanswythe was an Anglo-Saxon princess, a granddaughter of king Æthelberht of Kent (who was converted to Christianity by Augustine of Canterbury), and daughter of king Eadbald of Kent, who reigned from 616 to 640. She was born about 630, and it is believed that she was the abbess of a nunnery here.

The nunnery was later destroyed, perhaps by falling into the sea, or sacked by Vikings in 867. In 1138, after intermediate rebuilding, a new monastery was built, Folkestone Priory, with a church dedicated to St Mary and St Eanswythe, the foundation of the present building; the relics of St Eanswythe were brought into the church on 12 September 1138. The building was destroyed in a fire in 1216, and restored in 1220, and extended in 1236.

== 19th century and later ==
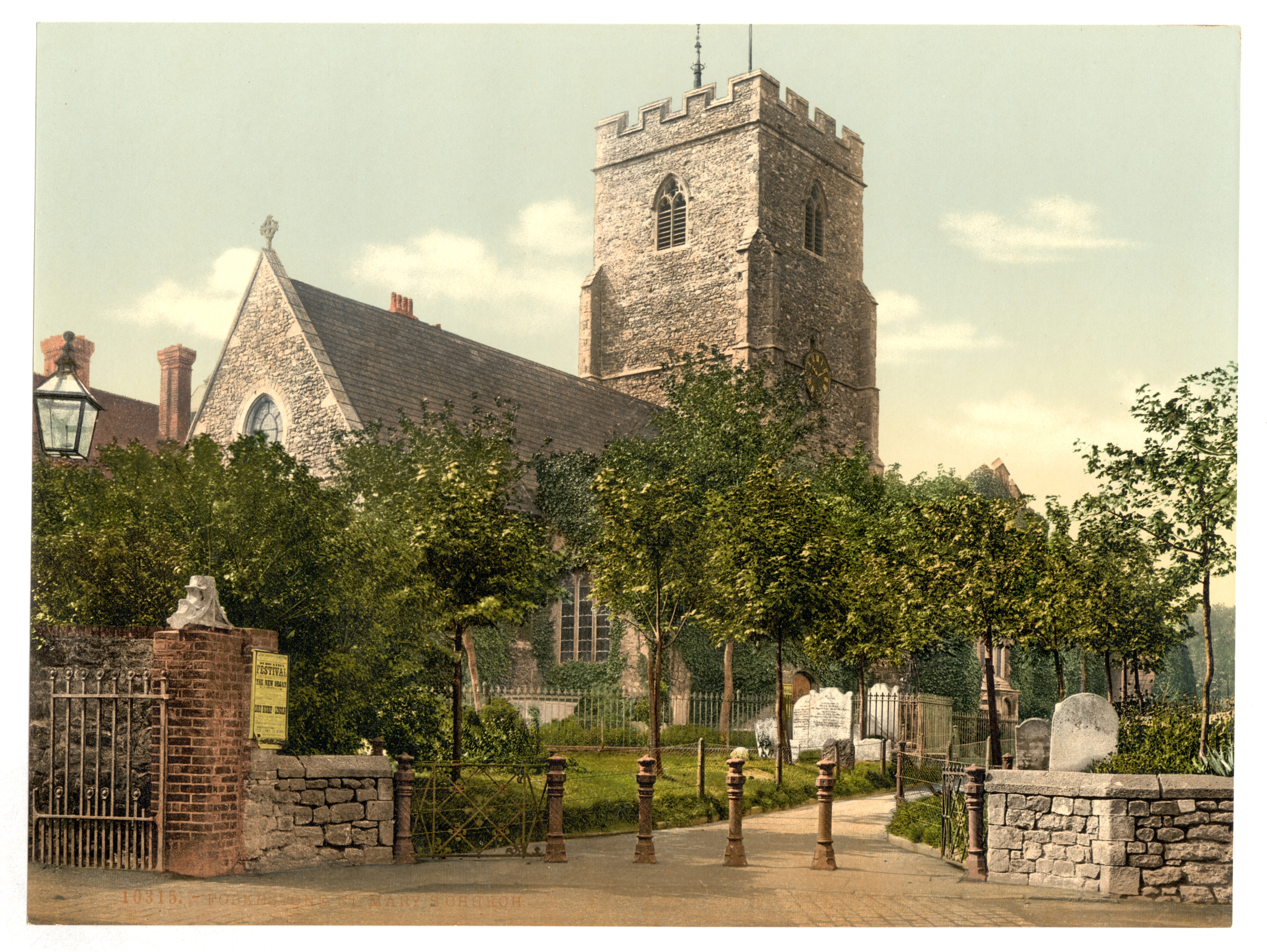
A Photochrom image of the church in the 1890s. View from the north-east.

In parts of the present building, the earlier church (before the 19th century) is still visible: the arcade of the chancel is of the 13th century; the lady chapel (north of the chancel) and St Eanswythe's chapel (south of the chancel), and the arches of the tower, are of the 15th century.

During the incumbency of Canon Matthew Woodward, vicar from 1851 to 1898, the church was largely rebuilt. The nave and north aisle were rebuilt by R. C. Hussey in the 1850s. The west window and porch were created by Stallwood in 1872. The south chancel aisle and transept were rebuilt in 1869, the south aisle in 1974. The three altar windows, and the windows in the Lady Chapel, were created by C. E. Kempe.

=== Discovery of reliquary ===
During renovation of the church in 1885, a reliquary was discovered in a niche in the walls near the altar. From the ornamentation it was judged to be of the 12th century. It contained the bones of a young woman who died in the 7th century; from the position of the reliquary, it was concluded that they were the remains of St Eanswythe. They were re-interred in the same place, the niche covered by a brass door and grille. Scientific re-examination early in 2020 confirmed that they almost certainly did belong to Eanswythe. The remains were finally replaced in the niche, in a specially designed reliquary, in November 2024.

=== Organ ===
It is known there was an organ in the church in 1528. It was rebuilt several times in the 19th century; further history from earlier centuries is little known. The present organ was built in the south transept by William Hill & Sons of London in 1894 and then rebuilt and enlarged in 1930 by Hill, Norman & Beard, so that it had 39 stops.

=== Closed churchyard ===
In December 2023, permission was granted by King Charles III for William Brown, a local boy killed in a hit-and-run incident, to be buried in the churchyard. The 'burial ground variation order', as advised by the Privy Council, permits burials at churchyards previously closed to new interments.
