= Folkestone Priory =

Pre-Reformation Benedictine monastery at Folkestone, Kent, England

Coordinates: 51°4′46″N 1°10′54″E

Folkestone Priory was a pre-Reformation Benedictine monastery at Folkestone in the English county of Kent. The priory church survives as the present parish church. It was the successor to Folkestone Abbey, an Anglo-Saxon nunnery on a different site.

== First foundation ==
It was probably the first nunnery built in England, founded in the 640s by Saint Eanswith, the daughter of King Eadbald of Kent, who was the son of Saint Æthelberht, the first Christian king among the English. The abbey was dedicated to Saint Peter. Like many other similar foundations, it was destroyed by the Danes and the ruins subsequently fell into the sea.

== Second foundation ==
In 1095, another monastery for Benedictine monks was erected on a different site by Nigel de Mundeville, Lord of Folkestone. This was an alien priory, a cell belonging to the Abbey of Lonley or Lolley in Normandy, dedicated to St Mary and St Eanswith, whose relics were deposited in the church. As with its predecessor, the cliff on which the monastery was built was gradually undermined by the sea, and William de Abrincis, in 1137, gave the monks a new site, that of the present parish church of Folkestone.

The conventual buildings were erected between the church and the sea coast. Being an alien priory it was occasionally seized by the king, when England was at war with France, but after a time it was made denizen and independent of the mother-house in Normandy and thus escaped the fate which befell most of the alien priories in the reign of Henry V. It continued to the time of the dissolution and was surrendered to the king on 15 November 1535. The names of twelve priors are known, the last being Thomas Barrett or Bassett. The net income at the dissolution was about £50. It was bestowed by Henry VIII on Edmund, Lord Clinton and Saye.

== Remains ==
The Chancel of the current church is partially that of the 1138 church.
