= 448 =

448 in various calendars
Gregorian calendar	448; CDXLVIII
Ab urbe condita	1201
Assyrian calendar	5198
Balinese saka calendar	369–370
Bengali calendar	−146 – −145
Berber calendar	1398
Buddhist calendar	992
Burmese calendar	−190
Byzantine calendar	5956–5957
Chinese calendar	丁亥年 (Fire Pig); 3145 or 2938 — to — 戊子年 (Earth Rat); 3146 or 2939
Coptic calendar	164–165
Discordian calendar	1614
Ethiopian calendar	440–441
Hebrew calendar	4208–4209
- Hindu calendars
Vikram Samvat	504–505
Shaka Samvat	369–370
Kali Yuga	3548–3549
Holocene calendar	10448
Iranian calendar	174 BP – 173 BP
Islamic calendar	179 BH – 178 BH
Javanese calendar	333–334
Julian calendar	448; CDXLVIII
Korean calendar	2781
Minguo calendar	1464 before ROC 民前1464年
Nanakshahi calendar	−1020
Seleucid era	759/760 AG
Thai solar calendar	990–991
Tibetan calendar	མེ་མོ་ཕག་ལོ་ (female Fire-Boar); 574 or 193 or −579 — to — ས་ཕོ་བྱི་བ་ལོ་ (male Earth-Rat); 575 or 194 or −578

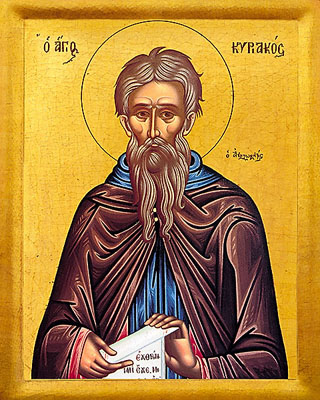
Saint Cyriacus of Athens

Year 448 (CDXLVIII) was a leap year starting on Thursday of the Julian calendar. At the time, it was known as the Year of the Consulship of Praetextatus and Zeno (or, less frequently, year 1201 Ab urbe condita). The denomination 448 for this year has been used since the early medieval period, when the Anno Domini calendar era became the prevalent method in Europe for naming years.

== Events ==
=== By place ===
==== Byzantium ====
- Emperor Theodosius II sends an embassy to Attila the Hun; Anatolius, an Eastern Roman general (magister militum) responsible for the security of the Eastern frontier, achieves a peace treaty with the Huns, in exchange for an annual tribute of 950 kilograms (2,100 lb) of gold per year.
- Attila demands in the treaty the evacuation of the territory running from Singidunum (Belgrade, in Serbia) 500 kilometres (300 mi) east along the Danube to Novae (Svishtov, in Bulgaria). This depopulated buffer zone deprives the Romans of their natural defensive advantages.
- Theodosius II orders all non-Christian books burned.

==== Europe ====
- Flavius Aetius suppresses the Bagaudae in Armorica (Gaul), and defeats the Salian Franks under King Chlodio near Arras (Belgica Secunda); the invaders are stopped around a river-crossing near Vicus Helena.
- Rechiar succeeds his father Rechila as king of the Suebi in Galicia (Northern Spain). He marries a daughter of the Visigoth king Theodoric I and converts to Catholicism.

==== China ====
- Kou Qianzhi, Chinese Daoist reformer, dies after having converted emperor Taiwu of Northern Wei and having established Daoism as the country's dominant religion. His death presages a revival of Buddhism as China's dominant faith.

=== By topic ===
==== Religion ====
- Eutyches is accused of heresy at a synod held in Constantinople.

== Births ==
- Cyriacus of Athens, Greek anchorite and saint (d. 557)

== Deaths ==
- Kou Qianzhi, Chinese high official and Daoist (b. 365)
- Rechila, king of the Suebi
- Saint Germanus, bishop of Auxerre (approximate date)
