= 713 =

Calendar year

713 in various calendars
Gregorian calendar	713; DCCXIII
Ab urbe condita	1466
Armenian calendar	162; ԹՎ ՃԿԲ
Assyrian calendar	5463
Balinese saka calendar	634–635
Bengali calendar	119–120
Berber calendar	1663
Buddhist calendar	1257
Burmese calendar	75
Byzantine calendar	6221–6222
Chinese calendar	壬子年 (Water Rat); 3410 or 3203 — to — 癸丑年 (Water Ox); 3411 or 3204
Coptic calendar	429–430
Discordian calendar	1879
Ethiopian calendar	705–706
Hebrew calendar	4473–4474
- Hindu calendars
Vikram Samvat	769–770
Shaka Samvat	634–635
Kali Yuga	3813–3814
Holocene calendar	10713
Iranian calendar	91–92
Islamic calendar	94–95
Japanese calendar	Wadō 6 (和銅６年)
Javanese calendar	606–607
Julian calendar	713; DCCXIII
Korean calendar	3046
Minguo calendar	1199 before ROC 民前1199年
Nanakshahi calendar	−755
Seleucid era	1024/1025 AG
Thai solar calendar	1255–1256
Tibetan calendar	ཆུ་ཕོ་བྱི་བ་ལོ་ (male Water-Rat); 839 or 458 or −314 — to — ཆུ་མོ་གླང་ལོ་ (female Water-Ox); 840 or 459 or −313

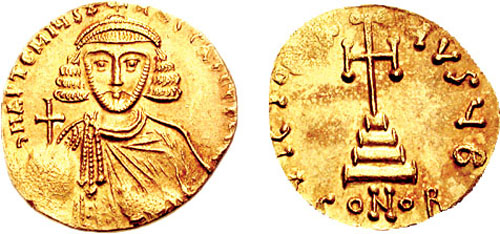
Emperor Anastasios II (713–715)

Year 713 (DCCXIII) was a common year starting on Sunday of the Julian calendar, the 713th year of the Common Era (CE) and Anno Domini (AD) designations, the 713th year of the 1st millennium, the 13th year of the 8th century, and the 4th year of the 710s decade. The denomination 713 for this year has been used since the early medieval period, when the Anno Domini calendar era became the prevalent method in Europe for naming years.

== Events ==
=== By place ===
==== Byzantine Empire ====
- June 3 – Emperor Philippicus is blinded, deposed, and sent into exile by conspirators of the Opsikion army in Thrace, after a reign of 1 year and 6 months. He is succeeded by Anastasios II, a bureaucrat and imperial secretary, who restores internal order and begins the reorganization of the Byzantine army. He executes the officers who have been directly involved in the conspiracy against Philippicus.
- Arab–Byzantine wars: The Umayyad Arabs under al-Abbas ibn al-Walid, son of caliph al-Walid I, sack Antioch in Pisidia (modern Turkey), which never recovers.

==== Britain ====
- King Ealdwulf of East Anglia dies, and is succeeded by his son Ælfwald. Queen Cuthburh of Northumbria travels south to found a monastery at Wimborne (Dorset).

==== Arabian Empire ====
- Umayyad conquest of Hispania: The Visigothic Kingdom is finally defeated at the Battle of Segoyuela (Castile and León). Prince Theudimer signs the Treaty of Orihuela with Abd al-Aziz, governor of Al-Andalus, and is permitted to retain his authority in the area subsequently known as Tudmir. He keeps the citadel of Orihuela and several other settlements, including Alicante and Lorca on the Mediterranean Sea.
- Arab forces under Musa ibn Nusayr conquer the fortress city of Mérida, located on the borders of Andalusia. It becomes part of the Umayyad Emirate of Córdoba.

==== China ====
- Emperor Xuan Zong liquidates the highly lucrative "Inexhaustible Treasury", which is run by a prominent Buddhist monastery in Chang'an. This monastery collects vast amounts of money, silk, and treasures through multitudes of rich people's repentances, left on the premises anonymously. Although the monastery is generous in donations, Xuan Zong issues a decree abolishing their treasury, on the grounds that their banking practices were fraudulent, collects their riches, and distributes the wealth to various other Buddhist monasteries, Daoist abbeys, and to repair statues, halls, and bridges in the city.
- In Chang'an, for the annual Lantern Festival of this year, recently abdicated emperor Rui Zong erects an enormous lantern wheel at a city gate, with a recorded height of 200 ft. The frame is draped in brocades and silk gauze, adorned with gold and jade jewelry, and when its total of some 50,000 oil cups is lit, the radiance of it can be seen for miles.
- Xuan Zong allots the money of 20 million copper coins, and assigns about 1,000 craftsmen to construct a hall at a Buddhist monastery with tons of painted portraits of himself, and of deities, ghosts, etc.
- Xuan Zong wins a power struggle with his sister, Princess Taiping. He executes a large number of her allies and forces her to commit suicide.

=== By topic ===
==== Literature ====
- During the Tang dynasty, Kaiyuan Za Bao ("Bulletin of the Court"), the first newspaper, hand printed on silk, is published (approximate date).

==== Religion ====
- Construction begins on the Leshan Giant Buddha near Leshan, Sichuan Province (China). Upon its completion in 803, it will become the largest stone carved Buddha in the world.

== Births ==
- Carloman, mayor of the palace (approximate date)
- Stephen the Younger, Byzantine theologian (or 715)
- Zhang Xuan, Chinese painter (d. 755)

== Deaths ==
- Ali ibn Husayn, fourth Shia Imam and great-grandson of Muhammad
- Ealdwulf, king of East Anglia
- Huineng, Chinese Zen Buddhist patriarch (b. 638)
- Li Jiao, chancellor of the Tang dynasty (b. 644)
- Philippicus, Byzantine emperor
- Taiping, princess of the Tang dynasty
- Suitbert, Anglo-Saxon missionary bishop
- Ursmar, Frankish abbot and missionary bishop
- Yijing, Chinese Buddhist monk and traveler (b. 635)
