= 712 =

Calendar year

712 in various calendars
- Gregorian calendar: 712; DCCXII
- Ab urbe condita: 1465
- Armenian calendar: 161; ԹՎ ՃԿԱ
- Assyrian calendar: 5462
- Balinese saka calendar: 633–634
- Bengali calendar: 118–119
- Berber calendar: 1662
- Buddhist calendar: 1256
- Burmese calendar: 74
- Byzantine calendar: 6220–6221
- Chinese calendar: 辛亥年 (Metal Pig); 3409 or 3202 — to — 壬子年 (Water Rat); 3410 or 3203
- Coptic calendar: 428–429
- Discordian calendar: 1878
- Ethiopian calendar: 704–705
- Hebrew calendar: 4472–4473
- Hindu calendars
- Vikram Samvat: 768–769
- Shaka Samvat: 633–634
- Kali Yuga: 3812–3813
- Holocene calendar: 10712
- Iranian calendar: 90–91
- Islamic calendar: 93–94
- Japanese calendar: Wadō 5 (和銅５年)
- Javanese calendar: 605–606
- Julian calendar: 712; DCCXII
- Korean calendar: 3045
- Minguo calendar: 1200 before ROC 民前1200年
- Nanakshahi calendar: −756
- Seleucid era: 1023/1024 AG
- Thai solar calendar: 1254–1255
- Tibetan calendar: ལྕགས་མོ་ཕག་ལོ་ (female Iron-Boar); 838 or 457 or −315 — to — ཆུ་ཕོ་བྱི་བ་ལོ་ (male Water-Rat); 839 or 458 or −314

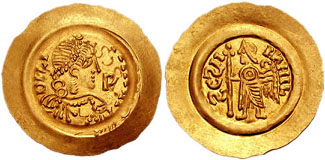
King Liutprand of the Lombards

Year 712 (DCCXII) was a leap year starting on Friday of the Julian calendar, the 712th year of the Common Era (CE) and Anno Domini (AD) designations, the 712th year of the 1st millennium, the 12th year of the 8th century, and the 3rd year of the 710s decade. The denomination 712 for this year has been used since the early medieval period, when the Anno Domini calendar era became the prevalent method in Europe for naming years.

== Events ==
=== By place ===
==== Byzantine Empire ====
- The Bulgars under Tervel, ruler (khagan) of the Bulgarian Empire, raid Thrace and reach the city walls of Constantinople. Skirmishes continue until 716; Emperor Philippicus transfers a Byzantine army from the Opsikion Theme in Asia Minor, to police the Balkan Peninsula.

==== Europe ====
- February – King Ansprand dies, and is succeeded by his son Liutprand as ruler of the Lombards. During his reign, Liutprand becomes the greatest of the Lombard Kings. Coins and documents from his court at Pavia confirm the impression of a strong and effective monarch.

==== Arabian Empire ====
- Umayyad conquest of Hispania: From North Africa, Musa ibn Nusayr lands in Iberia (Al-Andalus), with an army of 18,000 Arabs and Berbers. He joins the Islamic conquest and captures the city of Seville (Andalusia), where he meets stiff resistance after 3-months of siege.
- Arab forces under Qutayba ibn Muslim conquer Khwarezm and Samarkand (modern Uzbekistan).

==== Asia ====
- September 8 – Emperor Rui Zong abdicates after a brief reign, in favor of his 27-year-old son Xuan Zong, who ascends the imperial throne of the Tang dynasty (China).
- Xuan Zong reestablishes control over the Oxus and Jaxartes valleys. During his reign he defeats the invading Arab armies, in a series of campaigns in Fergana.
- King Dae Jo-yeong of Balhae (Korea) resumes tributary payments to the Tang dynasty. The Tai peoples are forced to accept Chinese sovereignty (approximate date).

712 CE saw the conquest of Sindh by Muhammad ibn Qasim of the Umayyad Caliphate, establishing the first Muslim-ruled territory in South Asia. Most of the Indian subcontinent remained under independent Hindu and Buddhist kingdoms.

=== By topic ===
==== Literature ====
- The Kojiki (Record of Ancient Times), a history of Japan, is completed.

== Births ==
- Abdallah ibn Ali, Muslim general (approximate date)
- Du Fu, Chinese poet (d. 770)
- Rupert of Bingen, patron saint (d. 732)

== Deaths ==
- Ali ibn Husayn, fourth Shia Imam
- Anas ibn Malik, well known sahaba. (b. 611 or 612)
- Ansprand, king of the Lombards
- Aripert II, king of the Lombards (or 711)
- Bran ua Máele Dúin, king of the Uí Ceinnselaig (Ireland)
- Cú Cherca mac Fáeláin, king of Osraige (Ireland)
- Fazang, Chinese Buddhist patriarch (b. 643)
- Idwal Iwrch, king of Gwynedd (Wales)
- Khri ma lod, empress of the Tibetan Empire
- Vindicianus, bishop of Cambrai (approximate date)
