= PERF 558 =

Oldest surviving dated Arabic papyrus (643)

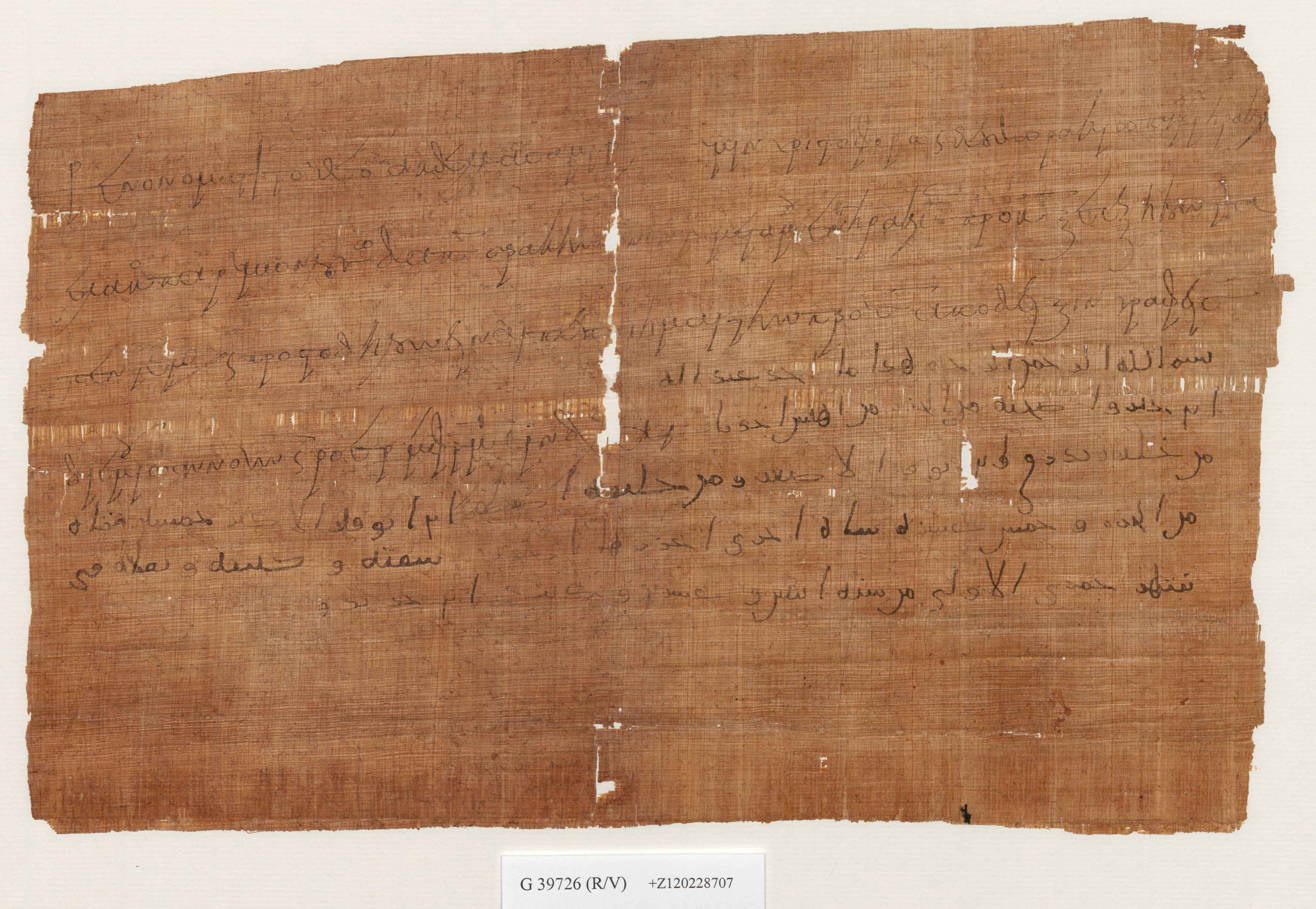
PERF 558, recto

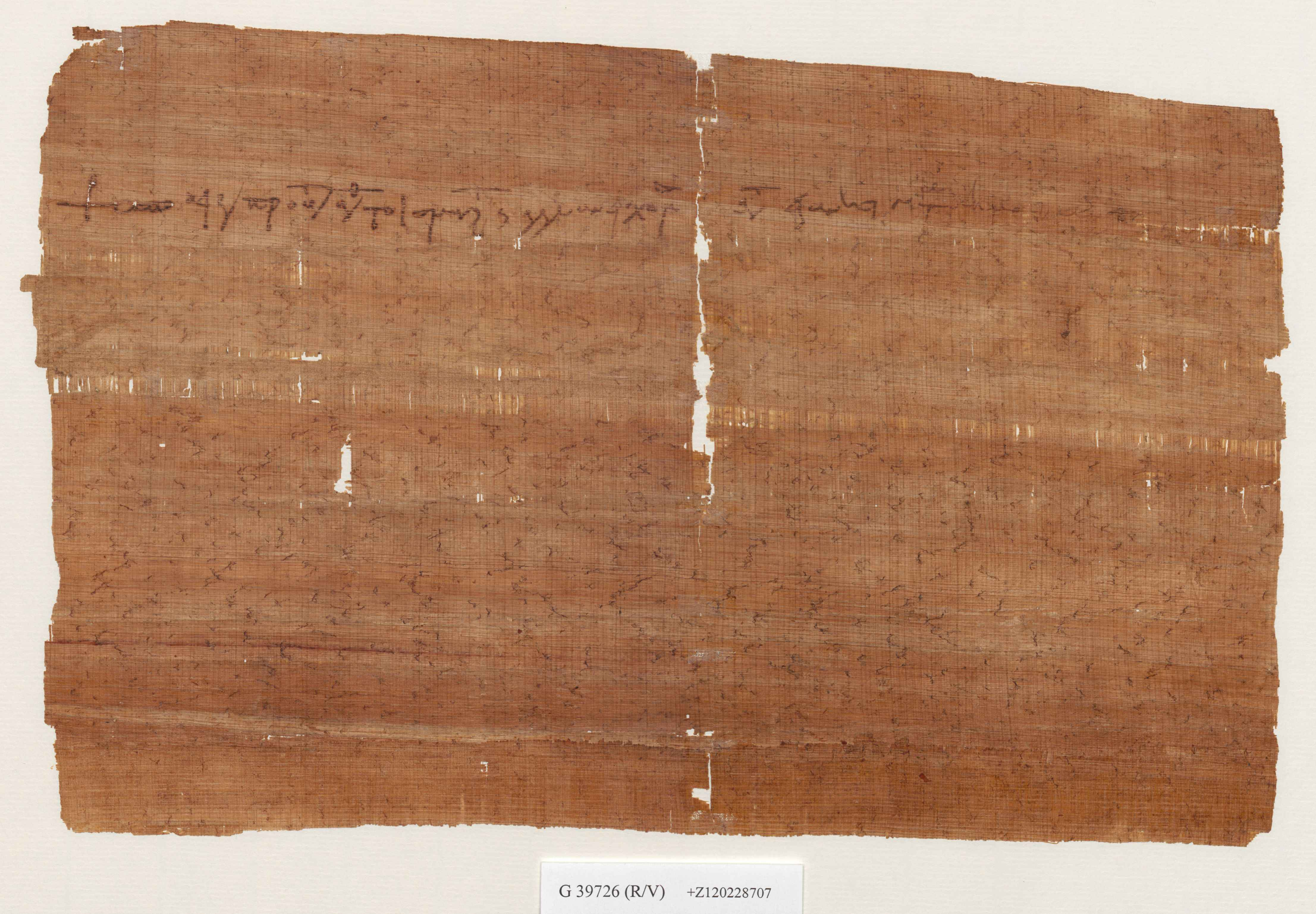
PERF 558, verso

PERF 558 is the oldest surviving Arabic papyrus, found in Heracleopolis in Egypt, and is also the oldest dated Arabic text using the Islamic era, dating to 643. It is a bilingual Arabic-Greek fragment, consisting of a tax receipt, or as it puts it "Document concerning the delivery of sheep to the Magarites and other people who arrived, as a down-payment of the taxes of the first indiction."

After excavation, the papyrus was collected by Archduke Rainer Ferdinand of Austria, who donated it to the Austrian National Library in 1899. The museum authority put it in the Erzherzog Rainer Papyrus Collection. This text was published in 1932 by Adolf Grohmann and in 2009 by Demiri and Römer.

== Features ==
- The first well-attested use of the disambiguating dots that would become an essential feature of the Arabic alphabet;
- It begins with the Greek formula "ev onomati tou teou" (In the Name of God) after a Sign of the Cross
- It records the date both in the Islamic calendar (an unspecified day in the month Jumada I, year 22) and in the Coptic calendar (30 Parmouti, 1st indiction), corresponding with 25 April 643 in the Julian calendar.
- In Greek, it calls the Arabs "Magaritae", a term, believed to be related to the Arabic "muhajir" often used in the earliest non-Islamic sources. It also calls them "Saracens".

== Text ==
Dots and hamzas added; otherwise, spelling uncorrected.

1. بسم الله الرحمن الرحيم هذا ما اخذ عبد اله [In the name of Allah, the Compassionate, the Merciful. This is what ʿAbdilah,]
2. ابن جبر واصحبه من الجزر من اهنس [Son of Jabir, and his companions-in-arms, have taken as of slaughter sheep at Heracleopolis (Ihnas)]
3. من خليفة تدراق ابن ابو قير الاصغر ومن خليفة اصطفر ابن ابو قير الاكبر خمسين شاة [from a representative of Theodorakios (Tidraq), second son of Apa Kyros (Abu Qir), and from a substitute of Christophoros (Istufur), eldest son of Apa Kyros (Abu Qir), fifty sheep]
4. من الجزر وخمس عشرة شاة اخرى اجزرها اصحاب سفنه وكتئبه وثقلاءه في [as of slaughter and fifteen other sheep. He gave them for slaughter for the crew of his vessels, as well as his cavalry and his breastplated infantry in]
5. شهر جمدى الاولى من سنة اثنين وعشرين وكتبه ابن حديدو [the month of Jumada al-Ula in the year twenty-two. Written by Ibn Hadidu.]

== Historical interest ==
This papyrus makes it possible to document the concomitant existence of two states of the Arabic language. Indeed, the name Abu Qir, which does not correspond to classical Arabic. This name is the Arabization of a Greek name Apa Kyros. For Pierre Larcher, it is not the trace of an old style which evolves towards a new "neo-Arabic" form but, conversely, the trace of the linguistic policy of Abd al-Malik which makes Arabic the official language, tries to homogenize the Koranic ductus and classicizes and promotes the old Arabic type. It is only later that Ibn Abu Qir will appear as a fault.

== See also ==
- Pre-Islamic Arabic inscriptions

== Bibliography ==
- Larcher, Pierre (January 2014). "Reviews: Lejla Demiri and Cornelia Römer". Arabica. 61 (1–2): 186–189. doi:10.1163/15700585-12341273. JSTOR 43306362..
- Larcher, Pierre (2010). "In Search of a Standard: Dialect Variation and New Arabic Features in the Oldest Arabic Written Documents". Proceedings of the Seminar for Arabian Studies. 10: 103–112. JSTOR 41224045..
