= 665 =

Calendar year

665 in various calendars
Gregorian calendar	665; DCLXV
Ab urbe condita	1418
Armenian calendar	114; ԹՎ ՃԺԴ
Assyrian calendar	5415
Balinese saka calendar	586–587
Bengali calendar	71–72
Berber calendar	1615
Buddhist calendar	1209
Burmese calendar	27
Byzantine calendar	6173–6174
Chinese calendar	甲子年 (Wood Rat); 3362 or 3155 — to — 乙丑年 (Wood Ox); 3363 or 3156
Coptic calendar	381–382
Discordian calendar	1831
Ethiopian calendar	657–658
Hebrew calendar	4425–4426
- Hindu calendars
Vikram Samvat	721–722
Shaka Samvat	586–587
Kali Yuga	3765–3766
Holocene calendar	10665
Iranian calendar	43–44
Islamic calendar	44–45
Japanese calendar	Hakuchi 16 (白雉１６年)
Javanese calendar	556–557
Julian calendar	665; DCLXV
Korean calendar	2998
Minguo calendar	1247 before ROC 民前1247年
Nanakshahi calendar	−803
Seleucid era	976/977 AG
Thai solar calendar	1207–1208
Tibetan calendar	ཤིང་ཕོ་བྱི་བ་ལོ་ (male Wood-Rat); 791 or 410 or −362 — to — ཤིང་མོ་གླང་ལོ་ (female Wood-Ox); 792 or 411 or −361

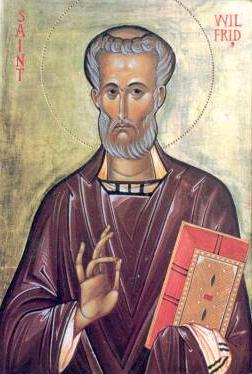
Icon of Wilfrid (c. 633–c.709)

Year 665 (DCLXV) was a common year starting on Wednesday of the Julian calendar. The denomination 665 for this year has been used since the early medieval period, when the Anno Domini calendar era became the prevalent method in Europe for naming years.

== Events ==
=== By place ===
==== Europe ====
- Kubrat, ruler (khagan) of Great Bulgaria, dies after a 33-year reign. He is succeeded by his son Batbayan, who rules from Poltava (modern Ukraine), the lands north of the Black Sea, and the Sea of Azov.

==== Britain ====
- Conflict erupts between King Sighere of Essex and his brother Sæbbi, as they struggle for overlordship between Mercia and Wessex.

==== Arabian Empire ====
- Muslim Conquest: An Arab army (40,000 men) advances through the desert, and captures the Byzantine city of Barca (Libya).

==== Asia ====
- The city of Seongnam (South Korea) is renamed Hansanju (approximate date).
- Wu Zetian, the wife of the Chinese emperor, unofficially becomes an absolute ruler by eliminating her political rivals.

=== By topic ===
==== Religion ====
- Wilfrid, Anglo-Saxon abbot, refuses to be consecrated in Northumbria as bishop, and travels to Compiègne (France) to be consecrated by Agilbert, archbishop of Paris.
- Jaruman, bishop of Mercia, is dispatched with Christian missionaries to reconvert Saxon tribes, which have returned to paganism.
- According to the Annales Cambriae, the Anglo-Saxons convert to Christianity after the Second Battle of Badon.
- Sighere encourages his subjects to reject Christianity and return to their indigenous religion (approximate date).

==== Science ====
- Brahmagupta writes his Khandakhadyaka.

== Births ==
- Ōtomo no Tabito, Japanese poet (d. 729)
- Sa'id ibn Jubayr, Muslim scholar (d. 714)

== Deaths ==
- April 16 – Fructuosus of Braga, French archbishop
- Féchín of Fore, Irish monk and saint
- Hafsa bint Umar, wife of Muhammad
- Kubrat, ruler (khagan) of Great Bulgaria
- Li Zhong, prince of the Tang dynasty (b. 643)
- Yu Zhining, chancellor of the Tang dynasty (b. 588)
