= 557 =

Calendar year

557 in various calendars
Gregorian calendar	557; DLVII
Ab urbe condita	1310
Armenian calendar	6 ԹՎ Զ
Assyrian calendar	5307
Balinese saka calendar	478–479
Bengali calendar	−37 – −36
Berber calendar	1507
Buddhist calendar	1101
Burmese calendar	−81
Byzantine calendar	6065–6066
Chinese calendar	丙子年 (Fire Rat); 3254 or 3047 — to — 丁丑年 (Fire Ox); 3255 or 3048
Coptic calendar	273–274
Discordian calendar	1723
Ethiopian calendar	549–550
Hebrew calendar	4317–4318
- Hindu calendars
Vikram Samvat	613–614
Shaka Samvat	478–479
Kali Yuga	3657–3658
Holocene calendar	10557
Iranian calendar	65 BP – 64 BP
Islamic calendar	67 BH – 66 BH
Javanese calendar	445–446
Julian calendar	557; DLVII
Korean calendar	2890
Minguo calendar	1355 before ROC 民前1355年
Nanakshahi calendar	−911
Seleucid era	868/869 AG
Thai solar calendar	1099–1100
Tibetan calendar	མེ་ཕོ་བྱི་བ་ལོ་ (male Fire-Rat); 683 or 302 or −470 — to — མེ་མོ་གླང་ལོ་ (female Fire-Ox); 684 or 303 or −469

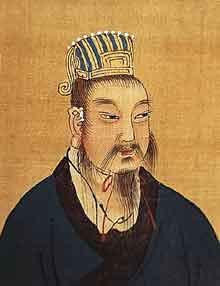
Emperor Chen Wu Di (503–559)

Year 557 (DLVII) was a common year starting on Monday of the Julian calendar. The denomination 557 for this year has been used since the early medieval period, when the Anno Domini calendar era became the prevalent method in Europe for naming years.

== Events ==
=== By place ===
==== Europe ====
- The Avars arrive in the northern region of the Caucasus, between the Black Sea and the Caspian Sea. They send envoys to the Byzantines in Lazica (modern Georgia). Like the Huns, the Avars are the former elite of a central Asian federation, which has been forced to flee westwards.

==== Byzantine Empire ====
- December 14 – The 557 Constantinople earthquake occurs.

==== Asia ====
- The Western Wei Dynasty ends: Yuwen Hu deposes emperor Gong Di, and places Yuwen Tai's son Xiaomin on the throne. Yuwen Hu becomes regent and establishes the Northern Zhou dynasty in China.
- Ming Di is made emperor, after his younger brother Xiao Min Di is arrested while trying to assume power. Xiao Min Di is deposed and executed by Yuwen Hu.
- The Liang dynasty ends: Chen Wu Di, a distinguished general, becomes the first emperor of the Chen dynasty in Southern China.
- The Göktürks under Muqan Qaghan ally with the Persian Empire, and destroy the Hephthalites (White Huns) in Central Asia.

=== By topic ===
==== Religion ====
- King Chlothar I of the Franks founds the Abbey of St. Medard at Soissons (Northern France).
- The Jiming Temple in Nanjing is built; the Buddhist pagoda is located near Xuanwu Lake.

== Births ==
- Dushun, Chinese (Buddhist) patriarch (d. 640)
- Gao Wei, emperor of Northern Qi (d. 577)
- Ouyang Xun, Confucian scholar (d. 641)

== Deaths ==
- March 14 – Leobinus, bishop of Chartres
- exact date unknown
  - Saint Cyriacus the Anchorite, legendary centenarian (b. 448)
  - Xiao Min Di, emperor of Northern Zhou (b. 542)
