= Eanswith =

7th-century Anglo-Saxon princess, religious figure

Saint Eanswith
- Born: c.630 Kent
- Residence: Folkestone
- Died: c.650 (Note: scientific examination of her bones and teeth has determined that her age at death was about 17-21); Folkestone
- Venerated in: Catholic Church, Anglicanism, Eastern Orthodox Church
- Major shrine: St Mary and St Eanswythe's Church, Folkestone
- Feast: 12 September (Western Christianity); 31 August (Eastern Orthodoxy)
- Attributes: crown, staff, book and sometimes a fish
- Major works: Founded Folkestone Abbey

Saint Eanswith (Old English: Ēanswīþ; born c. 630, Kent, England. Died c. 650, Folkestone, England), also spelled Eanswythe or Eanswide, was an Anglo-Saxon princess, who is said to have founded Folkestone Priory, one of the first Christian monastic communities for women in Britain. Her possible remains were the subject of research, published in 2020.

== Life ==
Eanswith was a princess of the Kingdom of Kent. Her father was Eadbald, who ruled as king of Kent from 616 to 640. Her mother, Eadbald's second wife, was Emma, who may have been a Frankish princess; she also bore him two sons, Eormenred and Eorcenberht. Eanswith's grandfather, Æthelberht of Kent had been the first king of Anglo-Saxon England to accept Christian baptism.

Tradition has it that Eanswith, with her father's support, founded the Benedictine Folkestone Priory, the first nunnery in England.

While the monastery was under construction, a pagan prince came to Kent seeking to marry her. Eadbald, whose sister Æthelburh (Ethelburga) had married the pagan King Edwin two or three years before, recalled that this marriage had resulted in Edwin's conversion. Eanswith, however, refused the match.

Instead of getting married, Eanswith lived at the monastery with her companions in the monastic life; they may have been guided by some of the monks who had come to England with Augustine in the Gregorian mission of 597.

== Veneration ==
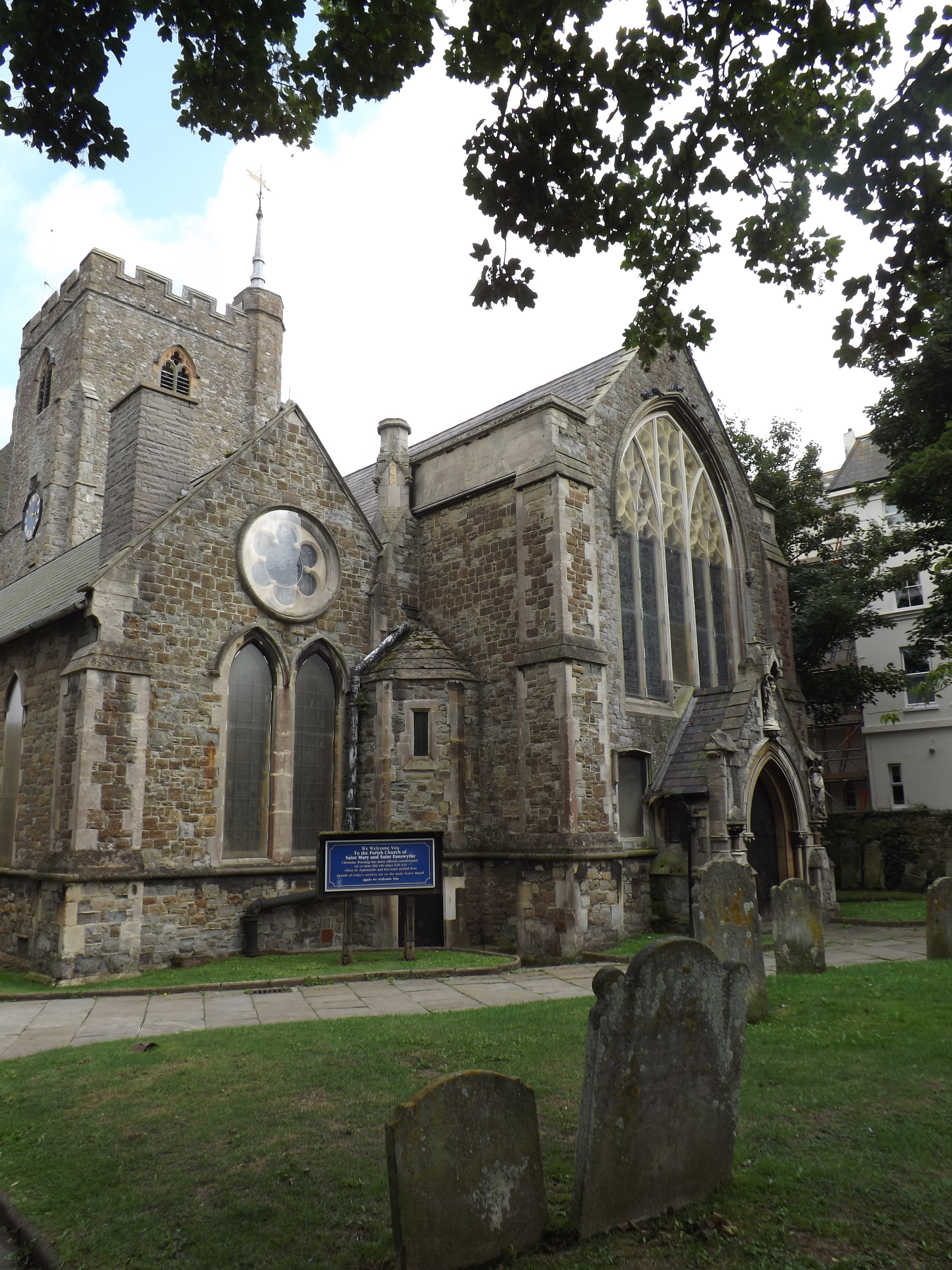
St Mary and St Eanswythe's Church, Folkestone

She remained at the abbey until her death.

The first monastic site became abandoned by the 10th century, and began to be eroded by the sea, a problem which also afflicted a new foundation of 1095. A site further inland was provided for a new foundation of Folkestone Priory by William de Abrincis in 1137, with a church dedicated to St Mary and to Eanswith. Saint Eanswith's day falls on 12 September; traditionally, this is the date on which her remains were translated to the new church in 1138. The priory was closed at the Reformation, and the priory church became the parish church of Folkestone, St Mary and St Eanswythe's Church. During restoration work at the church in 1885, human remains were discovered in a lead reliquary, embedded within the church's north wall, which were identified as a 12th-century vessel, and the bones of a young woman. This led to the supposition that they could be the translated relics of Saint Eanswith, hidden at the Reformation.

=== Iconography ===
Eanswith is sometimes portrayed with a fish, along with her abbess's staff, crown and a book. This appears to be a recent attribute, from Folkestone's fishing port connection.

== Documentary sources ==
- Eanswith is named in the genealogies of some versions of the Kentish Royal Legend
- Goscelin of Saint-Bertin mentions Eanswith in his 11th-century Vita Sancta Werburge.
- John of Tynemouth (14th-century chronicler) has a substantive account in his Sanctilogium. As with all the Kentish Abbesses, Bede does not name Eanswith, so John must have had another source.

== New research ==
In 2017 a collaboration began between Kent historians and archaeologists from Canterbury Christ Church University and Folkestone Museum. Church legislation was required for the removal and examination of the human remains that had been uncovered in 1885. In 2020, osteoarchaeologists were given the opportunity to examine the remains. Osteologists tested teeth and bones and determined that they had come from one person, probably a woman, aged between 17 and 21, with no signs of malnutrition, all consistent with the history of Eanswith. Samples were sent to scientists at Queen's University Belfast and radiocarbon dating confirmed that the remains were from the mid-7th century. The 'Finding Eanswythe' project received a grant from the Heritage Lottery Fund.

It can never be proven that the remains are St Eanswith but, if they were, they would be the earliest remains yet discovered of an English saint, and of a relative of a British monarch. The bones were reinterred in the Folkestone church in November 2024.

== Church dedications ==
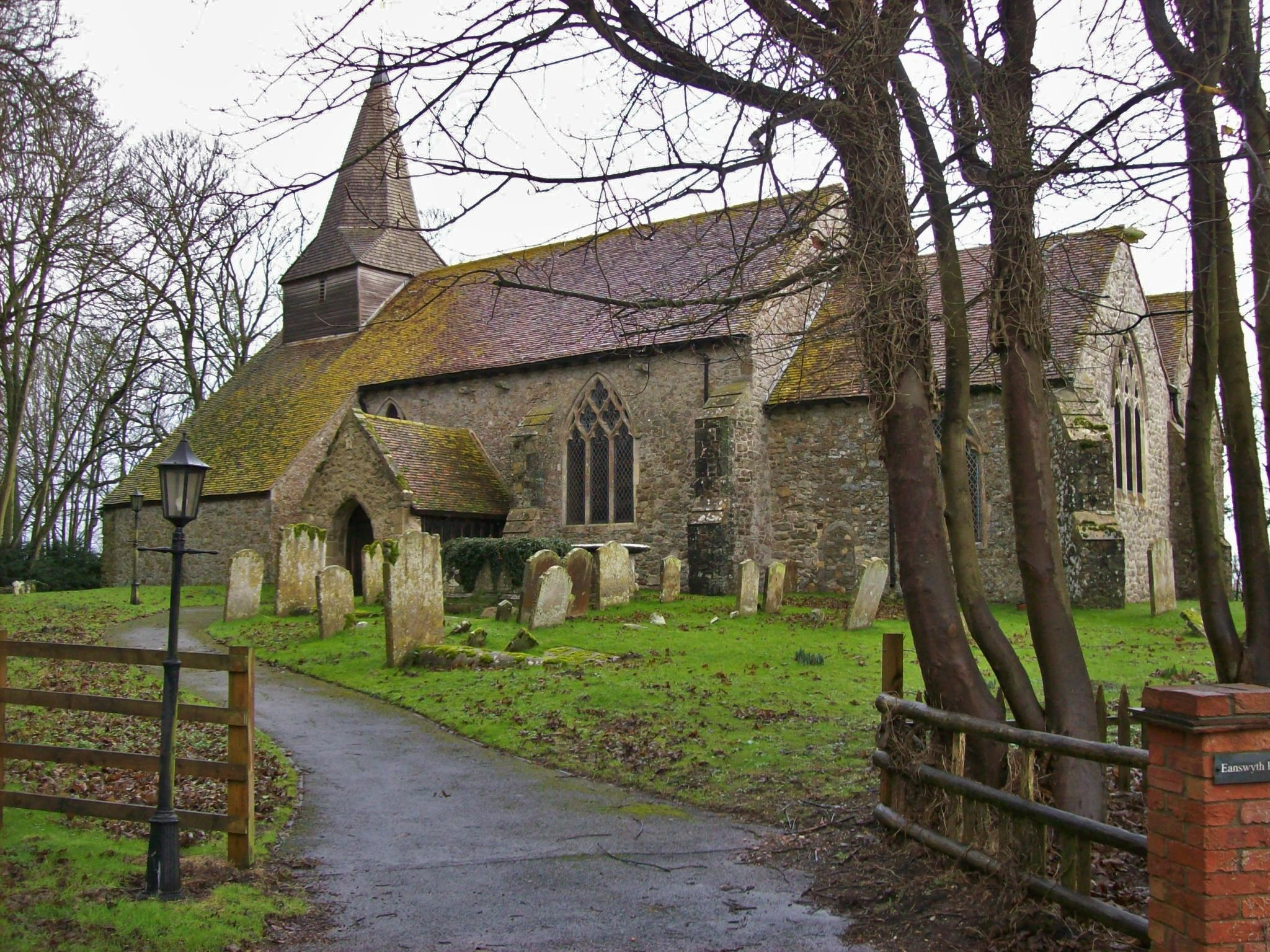
St Eanswith's in Brenzett

As well as the former priory church at Folkestone, Eanswith has the following church dedications:-

- St Eanswith's Church, Brenzett, Kent, England
- St Eanswythe's Church, Altona, Victoria, Australia

== See also ==
- Christianisation of Anglo-Saxon England
