= Pope John IV =

Head of the Catholic Church from 640 to 642

- Bishop of Rome
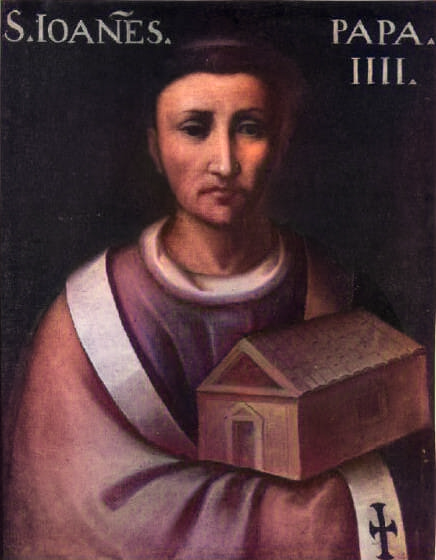
- Church: Catholic Church
- Papacy began: 24 December 640
- Papacy ended: 12 October 642
- Predecessor: Severinus
- Successor: Theodore I

Personal details
- Born: Iadera, Dalmatia, Eastern Roman Empire
- Died: 12 October 642 Vatican, Rome, Italy, Eastern Roman Empire

Pope John IV (Latin: Ioannes IV; died 12 October 642) was the bishop of Rome from 24 December 640 to his death on 12 October 642. His election followed a four-month vacancy. He wrote to the clergy of Ireland and Scotland to tell them of the mistakes they were making with regard to the time of keeping Easter and condemned Monothelitism as heresy. According to sacred tradition, he created the Catholic Church in Croatia with Abbot Martin.

== Rise ==
Pope John was a native of Iadera, Dalmatia. He was the son of the scholasticus (advocate) Venantius. At the time of his election, he was archdeacon of the Roman Church, an important role in governing the see. John was considered "a very cultured man". As John's consecration on 24 December 640 followed very soon after his election, it is supposed that the elections were being confirmed by the exarch of Ravenna rather than directly by the emperor in Constantinople.

== Papacy ==
While still only pope-elect, John, with the other bishops of the Catholic Church, wrote to the clergy of Ireland and Scotland to tell them of the mistakes they were making with regard to the time of keeping Easter, and exhort them to be on their guard against the Pelagian heresy. At about the same time, he condemned Monothelism as heresy. Emperor Heraclius immediately disowned the Monothelite document known as the "Ecthesis". To Heraclius' son, Constantine III, John addressed his apology to Pope Honorius I, in which he deprecated the attempt to connect the name of Honorius with Monothelism. Honorius, he declared, in speaking of one will in Jesus, only meant to assert that there were not two contrary wills in Him.

Troubles in his native land caused by the invasions of Slavs directed John's attention there. To alleviate the distress of the inhabitants, John sent the abbot Martin into Dalmatia and Istria with large sums of money for the redemption of captives. As the ruined churches could not be rebuilt, the relics of some of the more important Dalmatian saints were brought to Rome. John then erected an oratory in their honour. It was adorned by the pope with mosaics depicting John himself holding a model of his oratory in his hands. John endeavoured thereby to convert the Slavs in Dalmatia and Istria to Christianity. Emperor Constantine Porphyrogenitus claimed that Duke Porga of Croatia, archon of White Croats who have been invited into Dalmatia by Heraclius, sent to Emperor Heraclius for Christian teachers. It is supposed that the emperor to whom this message was sent was Emperor Heraclius himself, and that he sent it to Pope John IV.

John was buried in the Basilica of St. Peter.

== Notes ==
Catholic Church titles
Preceded by Severinus	Pope; 640–642	Succeeded by Theodore I
