= Lydéric and Phinaert =

Lydéric and Phinaert were semi-legendary figures tied to the foundation of the French city of Lille.

== Legend ==
Around 620 AD, the prince of Duchy of Dijon, Salvaert, made his way to the lands that would become the Kingdom of England with his pregnant wife, Ermengaert. While traveling through Flanders, they fell into a trap laid by the local lord, the giant Phinaert. Phinaert had the prince and his men killed, but Ermengaert fled and found refuge at a hermit's home in the forest, where she bore a son. On her death bed, she entrusted the baby to the hermit. He fed the boy deer milk and baptized him with his own name, Lydéric.

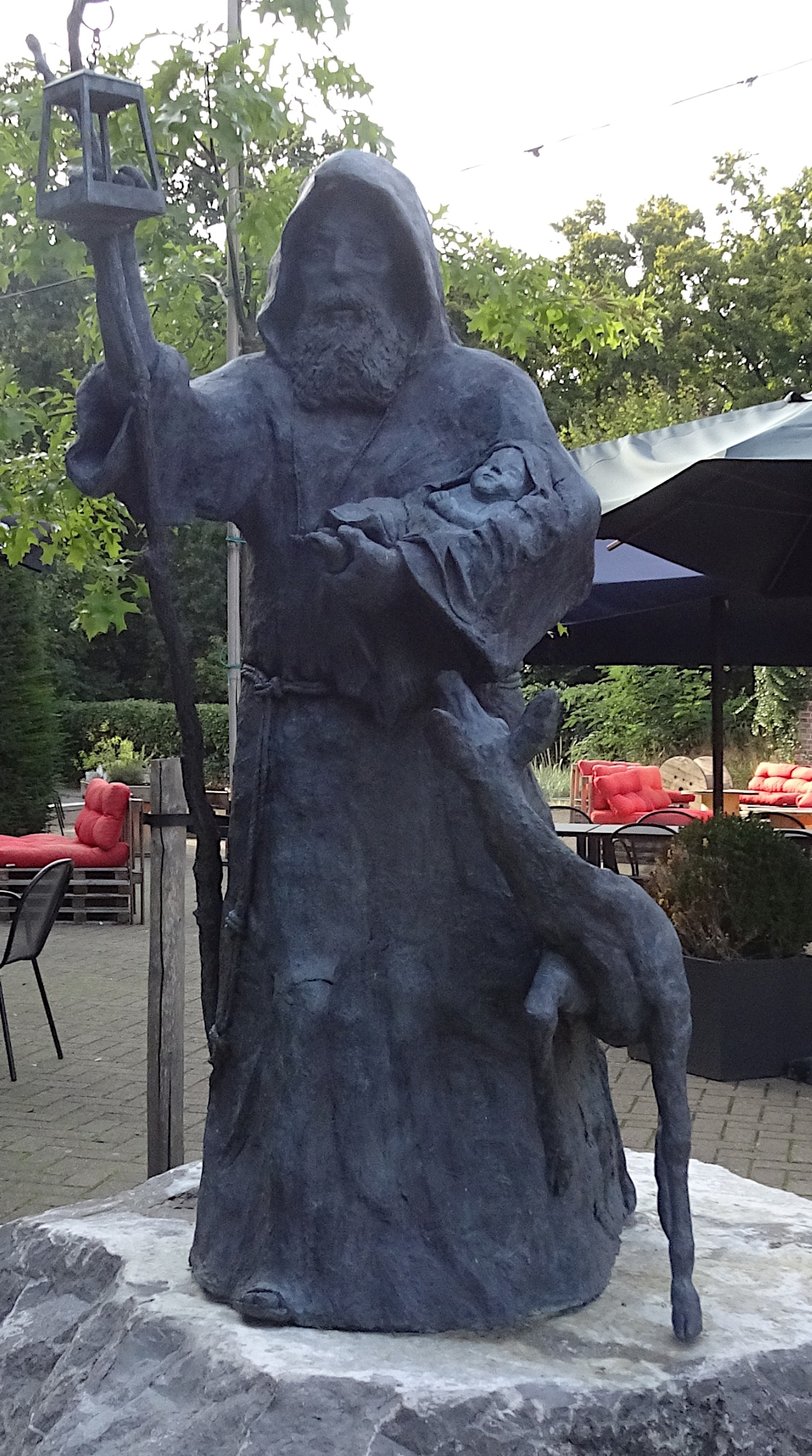
Statue of the hermit Liedericq at Kluisbergen, (Mont de l'Enclus)

Lydéric soon learned the truth about his origins, and as a youth, he set out to search for Phinaert. Lydéric found him at the court of Dagobert I at Soissons. Lydéric killed Phinaert in a duel and so avenged his parents' deaths. Phinaert's lands were given to Lydéric, where the young man founded the city of Lille in 640 AD.
