= Goeric of Metz =

- Bishop of Metz
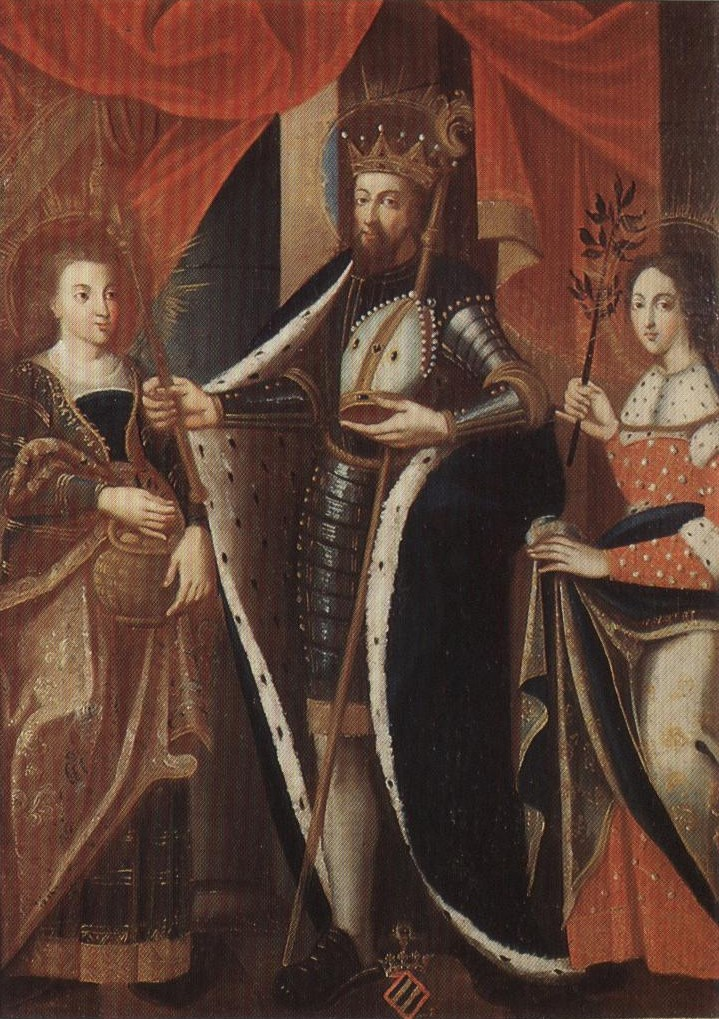
- In office: 627-643

Orders
- Ordination: by Arnulf of Metz

Personal details
- Died: September 19, 643

Sainthood
- Feast day: September 19

Goeric of Metz (Latin: Goericus; French: Goëri; died September 19 643 AD), also known as Abbo I of Metz, Goericus of Metz, and Gury of Metz, was a bishop of Metz. He is venerated as a saint in the Eastern Orthodox and Roman Catholic Churches.

== Biography ==
He was a married man with two daughters. He recovered his eyesight at St. Stephen's in Metz. Shortly thereafter, he joined the clergy and was ordained a priest by Arnulf of Metz. In 627, he succeeded Arnulf as bishop of Metz.

As bishop, he transferred the relics of his predecessor Arnulf to the Church of the Apostles. He also built the church of Great St. Peter's and the monastery at Epinal for his two daughters, Precia and Victorina. He was also a personal friend of Dagobert I.

He died in 643. He has the feast day of September 19. In the 10th century, his relics were brought from Saint-Symphorien to Epinal. This event is commemorated in the local Calendar of Saints on April 15.

== Bibliography ==
- Holweck, F. G., A Biographical Dictionary of the Saints. St. Louis, MO: B. Herder Book Co., 1924.
