= Maurikios Chartoularios =

Byzantine official and general

- Μαυρίκιος ὀ χαρτουλάριος

Chartoularios; later Dux of Rome
- Monarchs: Heraclius (610–641); Constans II (641–668)

Personal details
- Died: 643 Ravenna, Byzantine Italy
- Occupation: Official, general
- Known for: Revolt in Rome (643); plundering of the Lateran Palace

Military service
- Allegiance: Byzantine Empire

Maurikios Chartoularios (Greek: Μαυρίκιος ὀ χαρτουλάριος), Latinized as Mauricius Chartularius (died 643 at Ravenna), was a Byzantine official and general, and later rebel in Italy.

In 638 the Byzantine Emperor Heraclius (r. 610–641) demanded that the newly elected Pope, Severinus sign his assent to the Ecthesis, a document which defined monotheletism as the official imperial form of Christianity. When Severinus refused, Heraclius in turn refused to recognise him as Pope, and sent his chartoularios (secretary) Maurikios to Rome to obtain the Pope's agreement to the Ecthesis.

After his arrival, Maurikios, with the support of the local Roman militia, occupied the Lateran and plundered the papal palace. The Exarch Isaac also rushed to Rome and seized the Lateran treasure for the emperor, although he and Maurikios retained a significant portion for themselves. As a result, for almost two years Severinus was denied access to his office.

In 643, Maurikios, now the dux of Rome, attempted to repeat his successful action, but this time he was determined to not share any of the plunder with anyone. He revolted against Isaac, and declared Rome's independence from the Exarchate and from the emperor, Constans II (r. 641–668). In response, Isaac dispatched his magister militum Donus, who crushed the revolt. Maurikios sought sanctuary in the church of Saint Maria ad Praesepe, but he was dragged from the church and sent in chains to Ravenna and beheaded.
