= Otto (mayor of the palace) =

Austrasia mayor of the palace (died 643 or 644)

Otto (died 643 or 644) was the mayor of the palace of Austrasia briefly in the mid-seventh century.

Otto was the son of a domesticus named Uro who served in the court of Dagobert I. Otto was raised with Dagobert's son Sigebert III and subsequently acted as Sigebert III's baiolos (bailiff?). On the death of Pepin of Landen in 639 or 640, Otto challenged the succession of Grimoald the Elder to the mayorship. Otto was eventually murdered by Leuthard II, at the request of Grimoald.
