= Pope Honorius I =

Head of the Catholic Church from 625 to 638

- Bishop of Rome
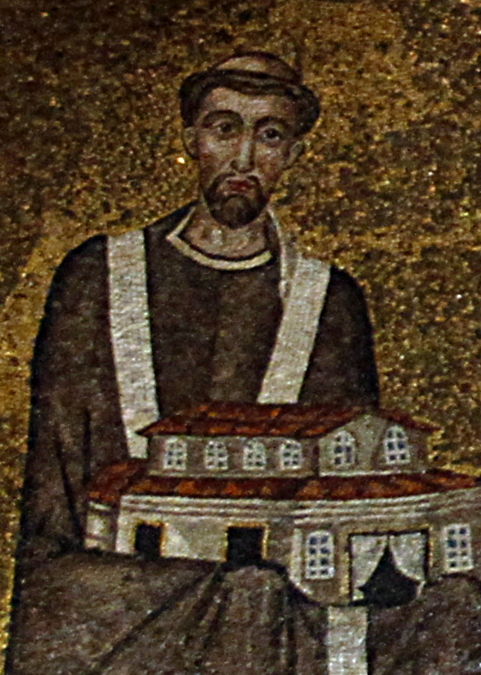
- Mosaic at Saint Agnes Outside the Walls
- Church: Catholic Church
- Papacy began: 27 October 625
- Papacy ended: 12 October 638
- Predecessor: Boniface V
- Successor: Severinus

Personal details
- Born: Campania, Byzantine Empire
- Died: 12 October 638

Pope Honorius I (born in Campania; died 12 October 638) was the bishop of Rome from his consecration on 27 October 625 until his death on 12 October 638.

Born in Campania, Honorius actively supported the Christianisation of the Anglo-Saxons, notably by sending Saint Birinus to convert the West Saxons and bestowing the pallium on the archbishops of York and Canterbury, and worked to persuade the Irish and British churches to adopt the Roman Easter computus. He is most noted for his correspondence concerning Patriarch Sergius I of Constantinople, in which he engaged with the Monoenergism controversy and the associated Monothelite doctrines.

Honorius was posthumously anathematized by the Third Council of Constantinople (681) for following the Monothelites and confirming their doctrines. This condemnation was confirmed by Pope Leo II, who charged him with failing to extinguish the heresy. The anathema against Honorius I became a primary argument cited by opponents of the definition of papal infallibility during the First Vatican Council (1870).

== Early life ==
Honorius I was a wealthy aristocrat born in Campania. His father was Petronius, who held the honorary title of consul. Little is known about Honorius I's life before he was elected pope on 27 October 625. He was consecrated two days after the death of his predecessor, Boniface V. The vacancy was short, a fact historians suggest was due to the presence in Rome of Isaac the Armenian, who, as the imperial exarch of Italy, was empowered to confirm the election.

== Papacy ==
As pope, Honorius I modeled his papacy after Gregory I and employed monks rather than secular clergy in the administration of the Lateran Palace. He supported Adaloald, the deposed Catholic king of the Lombards, but established diplomatic relations with Adaloald's Arian rival, Arioald. He did not succeed in resolving the Schism of the Three Chapters in Venetia and Istria, but attempted to appease the archbishops of Ravenna, who were dissatisfied with their subordination to Rome. Honorius actively supported the subjugation of the English Church to Rome and the spread of Christianity among of the Anglo-Saxon peoples of England and sent Birinus to convert the West Saxons. He had little success in convincing the Celtic clergy to abandon their divergent Paschal cycle. At the Sixth Council of Toledo, Honorius urged the Visigothic bishops to persevere in their policies regarding the Jews, referencing the precedents set by Gregory I.

Honorius intervened in early discussions regarding the controversy of Monoenergism, the teaching that Christ has only one energy, and the subsequent doctrine of Monothelitism, which posits that Christ has only one will; these stand in contrast to the Dyothelite teaching that he has two energies and two wills, both human and divine. Patriarch Sergius I of Constantinople wrote to Honorius regarding the Monoenergism controversy, asking him to endorse a policy of silence to prevent endangering Church unity through disputes over whether Christ possessed one energy or two. Sergius argued that the doctrine of two energies could lead to what he considered the erroneous belief that Jesus has two conflicting wills. Pope Honorius's reply in 635 endorsed the view that discussions over energies should cease. He agreed that Jesus does not have two conflicting wills, but one will, reasoning that Jesus did not assume the "vitiated" (corrupted by sin) human nature tainted by Adam's fall, but rather human nature as it existed prior to the fall.

Defenders of Honorius maintain that he did not endorse Monothelitism, as his later accusers would charge him with. His secretary and the scribe of the letter, Abbot John Symponus, later testified that the text referred to the human will alone, stating: "When we spoke of a single will in the Lord, we did not have in view His double nature, divine and human, but His humanity only."

Honorius's successor, John IV, defended him by stating that Honorius spoke "only of the human and not also of the divine nature" when using the phrase "one will". St. Maximus the Confessor also defended Honorius's orthodoxy. In his ecclesiastical history, Bede described Honorius as a holy pastor, a characterization later cited by theologians such as Robert Bellarmine to argue against charges of heresy. Honorius became aware of the rise of Islam and viewed the tenets of this emerging force as closely resembling those of Arianism.

== Legacy ==
In the XIII session of the Third Council of Constantinople on 28 March 681, the monothelites were anathematized by name, "and with them Honorius, who was Bishop of Rome, as having followed them in all things." Citing his written correspondence with Sergius, Honorius was subsequently accused of having confirmed his impious doctrines. The XVI session reaffirmed the condemnation of the heretics, explicitly stating, "To Honorius, the heretic, anathema!" This concluded with the decree of the XVII session on 16 September 681, that Honorius had not stopped provoking scandal and error in the Body of the Church; for he had "with unheard of expressions disseminated amidst the faithful people the heresy of the one will", doing so "in agreement with the insane false doctrine of the impious Apollinaris, Severus and Themistius." The Roman legates made no objection to his condemnation.

Pope Leo II's letter of confirmation of the Council commended it, stating that it had "perfectly preached the definition of the true faith," and made reference to the condemnation of his predecessor:

We anathematize the inventors of the new error, that is, Theodore, Bishop of Pharan, Sergius, Pyrrhus, Paul, and Peter, betrayers rather than leaders of the Church of Constantinople, and also Honorius, who did not attempt to sanctify this Apostolic Church with the teaching of apostolic tradition, but by profane treachery permitted its purity to be polluted.

Within the year, a Latin translation of the Acts of the council had been disseminated and signed by the Bishops throughout the West. The condemnation of Pope Honorius was reiterated by Pope Leo's successors and subsequent councils, and was included in the Roman Breviary lessons for the Feast of St. Leo II until the eighteenth century. As a result, Honorius would later be the subject of sustained criticism by opponents of papal infallibility in the discussions surrounding the First Vatican Council of 1870.

In the time surrounding the First Vatican Council, there was an attempt to re-evaluate the case of Honorius I. This was driven both by the historiographical controversy it generated during the debates on the definition of papal infallibility (since many opponents argued that the existence of a heretic Pope would contradict such Catholic dogma), and by the possibility of achieving his rehabilitation being freed from the anathema if it were proven that he did not believe in the Monothelite heresy and that his condemnation was a historical misunderstanding. That Honorius actually agreed with Sergius on the doctrine of monothelitism has given rise to much discussion. J. B. Bury argues that the most reasonable conclusion is that Honorius did not really apprehend the point at issue, considering it more a question of grammar than theology, for he placed "one energy" and "two energies" on exactly the same footing; in Bury's words, "it was for the 'imprudent economy of silence' that he was condemned". Louis Nazaire Bégin, whose work bore the Imprimatur of the Catholic Church, argued in the same way. He stated that Honorius was not a "formal heretic", but only a "material heretic" (or perhaps merely negligent but still orthodox) for tolerating the Monothelite heresy instead of believing and teaching it; thus, his condemnation was based on the guilt of negligence, and he could be exonerated from the anathema and excommunication.

In his first letter [from Honorius to Sergius] he repeats several times that "the Scriptures clearly demonstrate that Jesus Christ is the same one who works in divine and human things"; that "Jesus Christ works in both natures, divine and human." Nothing could be clearer or more obvious. The heresy is immediately overthrown. It is therefore evident that Honorius confesses in Jesus Christ not only two natures, but also two wills and two operations. Thus, this Pontiff professes Catholic truth in his letters; he only rejects the new words used to express it, and this for reasons of prudence, so as not to appear to favor Nestorianism or Eutychianism, and also because Sergius astutely portrayed these new expressions as causing trouble in the Church and an obstacle to the return of the Monophysites to orthodoxy.

... I do not deny the condemnation; on the contrary, I accept it according to what I said a moment ago; but I distinguish the word "heretic," which is quite imprecise and was even more so at the time of the councils in question. It designated not only those who knowingly and obstinately professed heresy, but also those who benefited from it in any way, whether by their silence and negligence when their responsibilities required them to act, by defending people or writings of heretics, or even by their communication with these heretics, or by having unwittingly accepted their doctrines.

... From this I conclude that Honorius could have been condemned as a heretic by these three councils, and that he in fact was, not for having taught error, but solely for not having exercised the necessary vigor in his duties as Head of the Church, for not having vigorously used his authority to suppress heresy, for having prescribed silence on the manner of expressing a truth, and thus having contributed to the spread of error.

This is the same conclusion reached by almost all those who dealt with this question during the Vatican Council. Dom Guéranger, Abbot of the Benedictines of Solesmes, said on this subject: “The true Sixth Council, the one to which the Roman Pontiff gave the necessary and canonical form, the one that requires the respect of the faithful, condemned Honorius only as an unfaithful guardian of the deposit of faith, but not as if he himself had been an adept of heresy. Justice and truth forbid us to go further.”

— Louis Nazaire Bégin, La Primauté et l’Infaillibilité des Souverains Pontifes (1873)

== Bibliography ==
- Bury, John B., A history of the later Roman empire from Arcadius to Irene, Volume 2 (2005)
- Harkianakis, Stylianos (2008). The Infallibility of the Church in Orthodox Theology. Sydney: St Andrew's Orthodox Press. ISBN 9781920691981.
- Hefele, Charles J., A History of the Councils of the Church, From the Original Documents, Volume 5 (1896)
- Meyendorff, John (1989). Imperial unity and Christian divisions: The Church 450–680 A.D. The Church in history. Vol. 2. Crestwood, NY: St. Vladimir's Seminary Press. ISBN 9780881410556.
- Phillips, Walter Alison (1911). "Honorius" . Encyclopædia Britannica. Vol. 13 (11th ed.). pp. 660–661, see first para. "1. Honorius I., pope from 625 to 638, was..."

Catholic Church titles
Preceded by Boniface V	Pope; 625–638	Succeeded by Severinus
