= Godeberta =

Saint Godeberta

Abbess
- Born: c. 640
- Died: c. 670
- Venerated in: Roman Catholic Church; Eastern Orthodox Church
- Canonized: Pre-Congregation
- Major shrine: Noyon Cathedral
- Feast: June 11, April 11: at Noyon fifth Sunday after Easter
- Patronage: Noyon, invoked against drought, epidemics, plague

Godeberta (Gothic meaning "fervor", 640–April 9 or 11, 670; also called Gotheberta and Gothoberta) was a saint and abbess. She was born of "pious parents" in Amiens, France, north of Paris. Her parents were nobles attached to the king's court, so she was carefully educated. When Godeberta was old enough, her father took her to the king's court to obtain permission to "marry her to someone of suitable rank and fortune". (Note: According to hagiographer Agnes Dunbar, Godeberta's father was one of the chief officers of Chlothar III, predecessor and father of Clovis II; the Catholic Encyclopedia states that this account occurred during Clovis II's reign.) Saint Eligius, who was present at court, was able to see that she wanted to "dedicate her virginity to God", and took off his episcopal ring and placed it on her finger in the presence of the king, pronouncing her a nun. Godeberta refused offers of marriage by her noble suitors, and the king, impressed with her zeal and conduct, endowed Godeberta with a small palace in nearby Noyon, north of France, with a chapel dedicated to Saint George. She turned her home into a monastery, where she was abbess for 12 young women. She chose Eligius as her spiritual guide.

Godeberta lived a life of prayer and solitude at the monastery in Noyon for the rest of her life, leaving occasionally when "the call of charity or religion brought her forth among the people", many of whom were pagans. She also practiced penances, fasts, and believed in the efficacy of the sign of the cross. According to the Catholic Encyclopedia, in 676, when Noyon was threatened with fire, she made the sign of the cross over the flames and they were immediately extinguished, saving the town from destruction. Dunbar reported that "her sanctity was shown by many miracles".

Godeberta died in 670 at Noyon, probably on June 11, although the exact date of her death is unknown. Her body was interred in the church of St. George, which was renamed for her after her death. In 1168, her body was translated from the church, which was in ruins, to the Noyon Cathedral. Her relics, which included a bell that she used in her convent and the ring presented to her by Eligius, had survived. During the French Revolution, a "pious townsman" buried her relics near the cathedral, and were returned to the cathedral after the Revolution ended. Even though little historical details remain about Godeberta, she was seen as a protector during times of "plagues and catastrophes". The Catholic Encyclopedia reports that in 1866, during an outbreak of typhoid fever in Noyon, a leading citizen of the town whose child had died asked that Godeberta's relics be exposed, that a novena of intercession be practiced, and the town's inhabitants observe a three-day fast and wear sackcloth and ashes. The outbreak ended, and a few weeks later, her relics were paraded through the town and a statue of Godeberta was made to commemorate the miracle.

Godeberta's feast is celebrated on June 11; it is also celebrated in Noyon on the fifth Sunday after Easter. She is the patroness of Noyon, France and is invoked against pestilence and rain. She is represented holding a ring. In 1449, Flemish artist Petrus Christus painted St. Eligius in His Workshop (also known as The Legend of Saint Eligius and Saint Godeberta), which depicts Saint Eligius, Godeberta, and the king in Eligius' goldsmithing workshop, providing Godeberta the ring that espoused her to Christ. The painting is currently held at the Metropolitan Museum of Art.
