= Isaac the Armenian =

Exarch of Ravenna during the 7th century

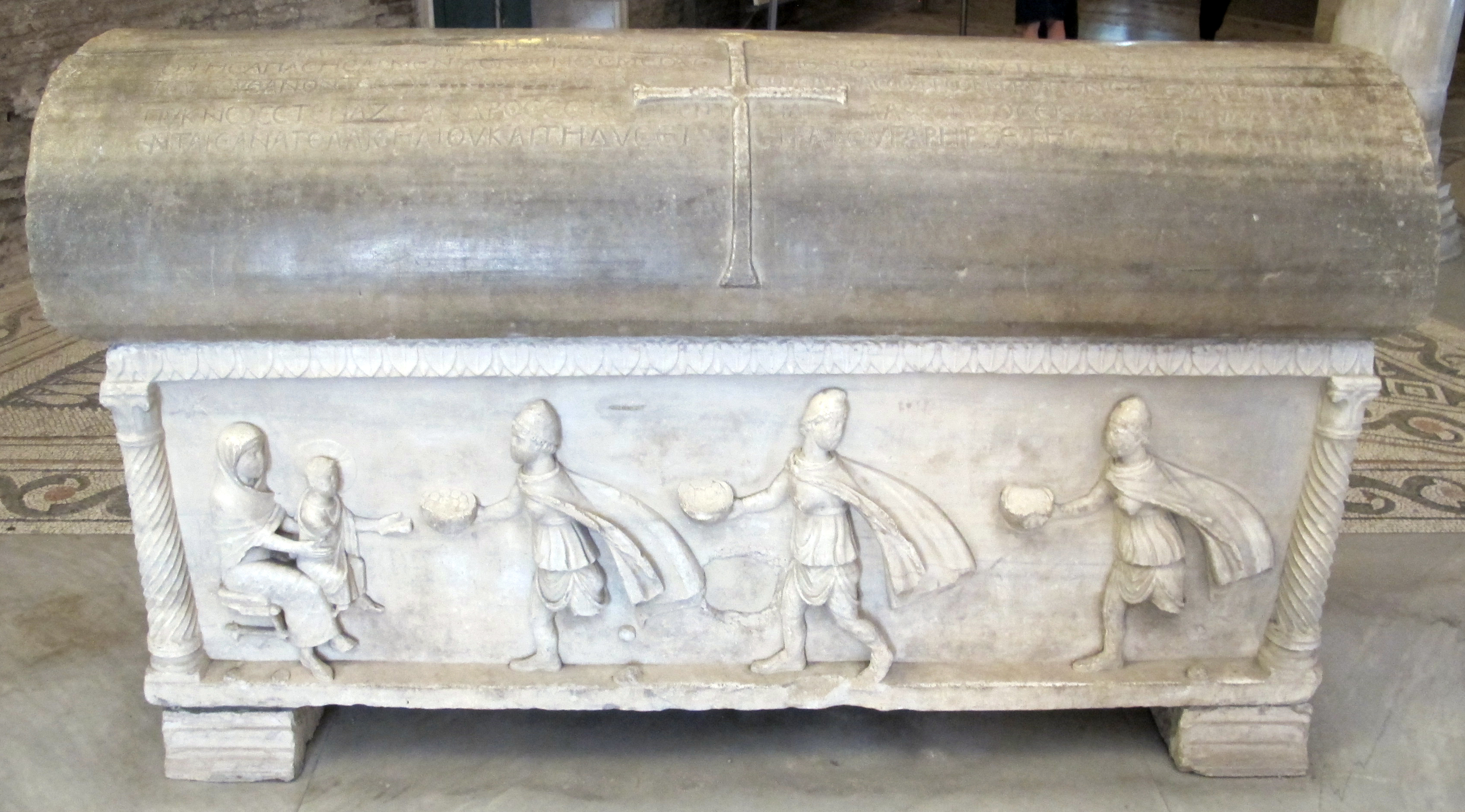
Sarcophagus of Isachius, in Ravenna.

Isaac the Armenian (Latin: Isachius Armenus; Ancient Greek: Ισαάκ, romanized: Isaák) was an exarch of Ravenna hailing from the Kamsarakan clan. The chronology of the Exarchate in this period is uncertain: either he succeeded Euselnus and served c. 625 – 643; or he succeeded Eleutherius, and served 620 – 637.

== Life and reign ==
The Chronicle of Fredegar records a story of how Isaac slew Tasso, duke of Tuscany, by deceit for the benefit of the Lombard king Arioald. However, according to Paul the Deacon, it was the patriarch Gregory who killed Tasso, and Tasso was instead the Duke of Friuli with his brother Kakko.

In 638, the Eastern Roman Emperor Heraclius demanded that the new Pope Severinus sign his Ecthesis, a Monothelite profession of faith. Severinus refused; Heraclius denied recognition to the pope and sent an official named Maurikios Chartoularios to negotiate with the papacy. Maurikios Chartoularios, after arriving in Rome, seized the Lateran and encouraged Isaac to come to the city. Isaac did so; he then briefly resided in the Lateran and with Maurikios Chartoularios plundered the palace. Some of the treasure was sent to Heraclius; much of the rest went to the exarch. Some time later, Maurikios Chartoularios attempted to repeat the action; however, in order to avoid sharing the wealth, he denied recognition to the exarch. Isaac then captured Maurikios Chartoularios and had him executed.

The Lombard king Rothari conquered all of the imperial possessions in Liguria, as well as much of Emilia, in around 643. A battle fought between the Lombards and troops of the Exarchate on the banks of the Panaro ended in defeat for the Eastern Romans, with several thousand soldiers killed. Although Isaac himself probably met his death fighting the Lombards, the author of the life of Pope Theodore in the Liber Pontificalis writes that Isaac died of a stroke. There is a sarcophagus of Isaac's located in the Sancta Sanctorum, which contains depictions of Daniel, the adoration of the Magi, and Lazarus.

Preceded by Eleutherius	Exarch of Ravenna c. 625 – c.643	Succeeded by Theodore I Calliopas
