= Leuthari II =

Leutharis, Leuthari, Leuthard, or Leutharius II (fl. c. 643) was the Duke of Alamannia in the early seventh century.

Leuthari murdered Otto, the mayor of the palace of Austrasia, in 643. By doing so he made Grimoald I the mayor of the palace for Sigebert III. It is not known exactly what the duchy of Leuthari consisted of, since there was an Alamannic duke named Gunzo from the same time. Perhaps they co-ruled the same territory, or perhaps there were two Alamannic duchies. The duchy of Alsace under Gundoin was also partly Alamannic.

== Sources ==
- Bachrach, Bernard S. Merovingian Military Organization, 481–751. Minneapolis: University of Minnesota Press, 1971. ISBN 0-8166-0621-8
- Geuenich, Dieter. Geschichte der Alemannen. Stuttgart: Kohlhammer Verlag, 2004. ISBN 3-17-018227-7
- Wallace-Hadrill, J. M., translator. The Fourth Book of the Chronicle of Fredegar with its Continuations. Connecticut: Greenwood Press, 1960.
