= Pope Severinus =

Head of the Catholic Church in 640

- Bishop of Rome
- Church: Catholic Church
- Papacy began: 28 May 640
- Papacy ended: 2 August 640
- Predecessor: Honorius I
- Successor: John IV

Personal details
- Born: Rome, Byzantine Empire
- Died: 2 August 640 (aged 55) Rome, Byzantine Empire

Pope Severinus (died 2 August 640) was the bishop of Rome elected in October 638. He was caught up in a power struggle with Byzantine Emperor Heraclius, who pressured him to accept Monothelitism. Severinus refused, which for over eighteen months hindered his efforts to obtain imperial recognition of his election. His pontificate was finally sanctioned on 28 May 640, but he died two months later.

== Early career ==
Severinus was a Roman. His father was named Avienus, according to the Liber Pontificalis. The name of the father suggests descent from members of the Roman Senate. A previous Avienus was Roman consul in 501. Already an old man, Severinus was elected to succeed Honorius I as pope in mid-October 638.

== Monothelite controversy ==
Patriarch Sergius I of Constantinople had drawn up the Ecthesis in response to the orthodox synodical letter of Patriarch Sophronius of Jerusalem. On learning of the death of Honorius, Sergius convinced Emperor Heraclius to issue this document as an imperial edict in December 638, thus valid across the entire empire. Eustachius, the magister militum, carried it to Isaac the Armenian, the exarch of Ravenna, with instructions that he was to ensure the new pope's acceptance of the Monothelite teaching. With its declaration of Jesus Christ only possessing one will, Severinus refused to sign it. The exarch therefore refused to confirm the papal election in the emperor's name, a situation that endured for over eighteen months.

Isaac was determined to achieve his aim, so he commissioned Maurice, the chartoularios, to plunder the Lateran Palace and force Severinus to agree to the Ecthesis. Maurice gathered together a party of local discontented nobles and approached the local soldiers, the exercitus Romanus, and convinced them that the pope had withheld their pay and was keeping the arrears in the Lateran. A mob soon formed and they rushed en masse to the palace. Severinus managed to keep the hostile forces out of the palace. Maurice tried another tactic and three days later he was admitted into the palace with the city judges whom he won over to his side. They sealed up the treasures, and Maurice sent word to the exarch that he was free to come to the palace and help himself to the accumulated riches. Isaac soon appeared, and after exiling the leading clergy within the Lateran, spent the next eight days looting the palace, prudently sending a share to the emperor at Constantinople to prevent his displeasure.

Meanwhile, at Constantinople, the papal legates had continued to seek the confirmation of Severinus. Emperor Heraclius still refused to grant his confirmation unless Severinus signed the Ecthesis. At first they were clearly told that unless they would go back and persuade the pope to accept the Ecthesis, they were wasting their time. The legates sought to persuade an unwell and slowly dying Heraclius that they were not there to make professions of faith, but to transact business. The envoys were unwilling to agree to this demand, but they were also unwilling to allow the Roman See to remain vacant indefinitely, so they offered to show Severinus the document and ask him to sign it if he thought it was correct. They made it clear that if the emperor was going to force Severinus to sign it, that all the clergy of the See of Rome would stand together, and such a route would only end in a lengthy and destructive stalemate. This offer was apparently satisfactory, and imperial recognition of the papal election was granted on 28 May 640.

== Death and legacy ==
Severinus died on 2 August 640, two months after his pontificate had finally started. In the Liber Pontificalis, Severinus was described as a kind, generous and mild holy man, a benefactor to the clergy, and a friend to the poor.

== Notes ==
Catholic Church titles
Preceded by Honorius I	Pope; 640	Succeeded by John IV
