= Byzantine Papacy =

Byzantine domination of the Roman papacy, 537 to 752

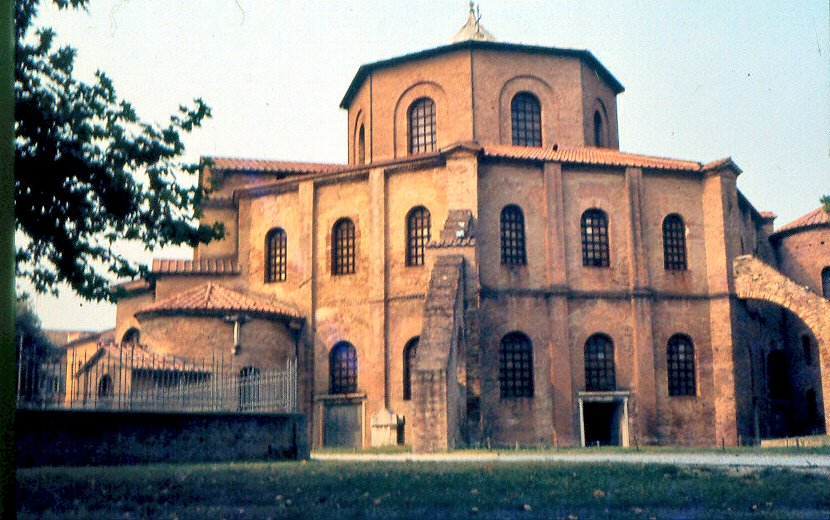
The Basilica of San Vitale in Ravenna, consecrated in 547, combines Western and Byzantine elements.

The Byzantine Papacy was a period of Byzantine domination of the Roman Papacy from 537 to 752, when popes required the approval of the Byzantine Emperor for their episcopal consecration, and many popes were chosen from the apocrisiarii (liaisons from the pope to the emperor) or the inhabitants of Byzantine-ruled Greece, Syria, or Sicily. Justinian I reconquered the Italian Peninsula in the Gothic War (535–554) and appointed the next three popes, a practice that would be continued by his successors and later be delegated to the Exarchate of Ravenna.

With the exception of Martin I, no pope during this period questioned the authority of the Byzantine monarch to confirm the election of the bishop of Rome before consecration could occur; however, theological conflicts were common between pope and emperor in the areas such as monothelitism and iconoclasm.

Greek speakers from Greece, Syria, and Sicily replaced members of the powerful Roman nobles in the papal chair during this period. Rome under the Greek popes constituted a "melting pot" of Western and Eastern Christian traditions, reflected in art as well as liturgy.

== History ==
=== Origins (534–638) ===
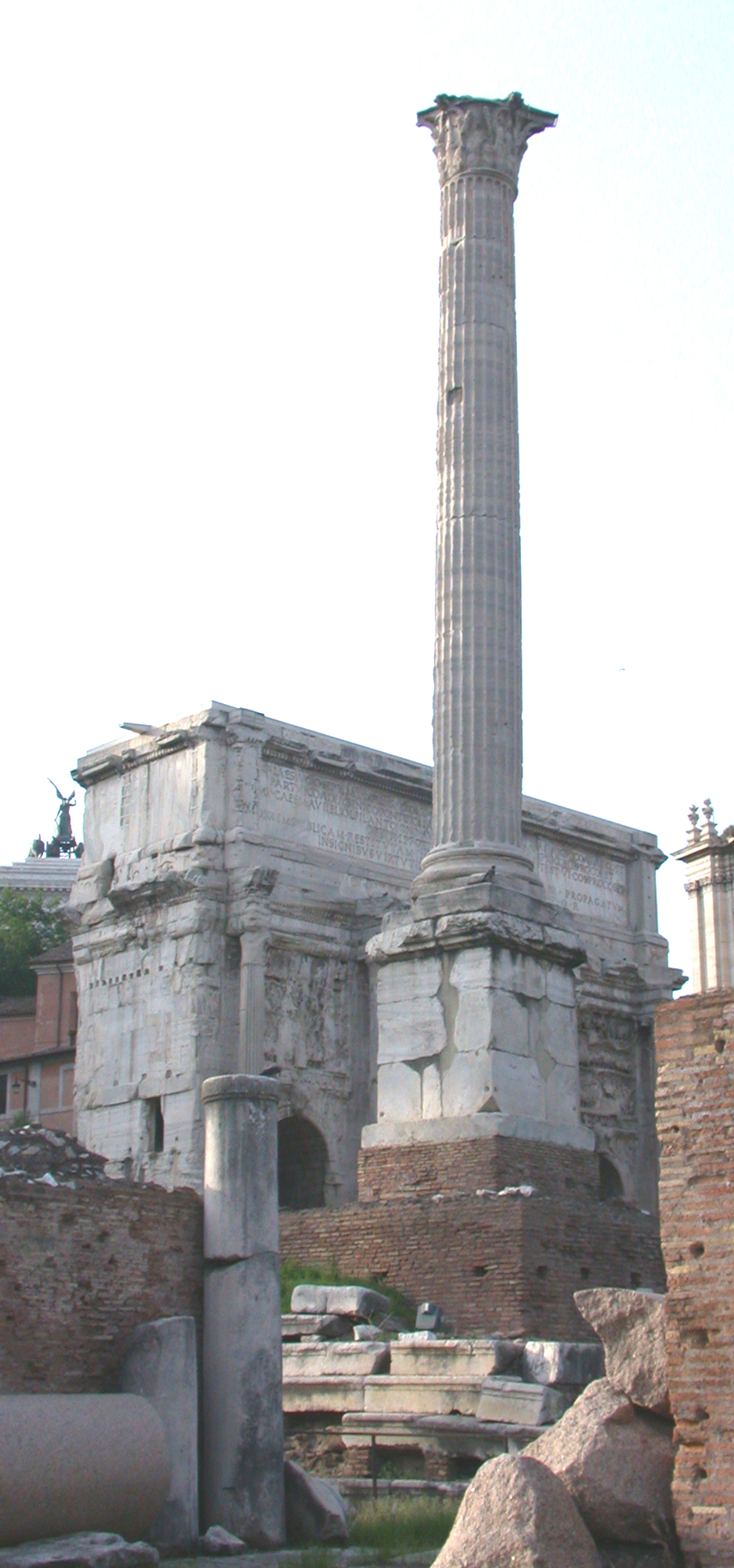
The Column of Phocas, the only extant public monument erected in seventh-century Rome by the Byzantines

After his invasion of Italy during the Gothic War (535–554), Emperor Justinian I forced the Goth-appointed Pope Silverius to abdicate and installed Pope Vigilius, a former apocrisiarius to Constantinople, in his place; Justinian next appointed Pope Pelagius I, holding only a "sham election" to replace Vigilius; afterwards, Justinian was content to be limited to the approval of the pope, as with Pope John III after his election. Justinian's successors would continue the practice for over a century.

Although the Byzantine troops that captured Italy called themselves Romans, many inhabitants of the city had a deep-seated mistrust of Greeks, and Hellenistic influence more generally. Before long, the citizens of Rome petitioned Justinian to recall Narses (who captured Rome in 552), declaring that they would rather still be ruled by the Goths. Anti-Byzantine sentiment could also be found throughout the Italian peninsula, and reception of Greek theology in Latin circles was more mixed.

The continuing power of appointment of the Byzantine emperor can be seen in the legend of Pope Gregory I writing to Constantinople, asking the emperor to refuse his election. Pope Boniface III issued a decree denouncing bribery in papal elections and forbidding discussion of candidates for three days after the funeral of the previous pope; thereafter, Boniface III decreed that the clergy and the "sons of the Church" (i.e. noble laymen) should meet to elect a successor, each voting according to his conscience. This abated factionalism for the next four successions, each resulting in quick elections and imperial approval.

The prestige of Gregory I ensured a gradual incorporation of Eastern influence, which retained the distinctiveness of the Roman church; Gregory's two successors were chosen from his former apocrisiarii to Constantinople, in an effort to gain the favor of Phocas, whose disputed claim to the throne Gregory had enthusiastically endorsed. Pope Boniface III was very likely of Greek extraction, making him the "Easterner on the papal throne" in 607 (many authors incorrectly regard Pope Theodore I, who reigned from 642 to 649, as the first Eastern pope of the Byzantine papacy). Boniface III was able to obtain an imperial proclamation declaring Rome as "the head of all the churches" (reaffirming Justinian I's naming the pope "the first among all the priests"), a decree Phocas intended as much to humiliate the Patriarch of Constantinople as exalt the pope.

Phocas had a gilded statue of himself erected on a monumental column in the Roman Forum only three weeks after Boniface III's consecration, and in 609 by iussio authorized the conversion of the Pantheon into a Christian church, the first pagan Roman temple so converted. Boniface III himself attempted to outdo Phocas's efforts to Christianize the site, collecting twenty-four cartloads of martyr bones from the Catacombs of Rome to enshrine in the temple. A 610 synod ruled that monks could be full members of the clergy, a decision that would massively increase the hordes of Greek monks about to flee to Rome as the Slavs conquered much of the Balkan coast. At this time Salona in Dalmatia, Prima Justiniana in Illyricum, peninsular Greece, Peloponnesus, and Crete were under the ecclesiastical jurisdiction of Rome, and Constantinople was one of "the last places to which one could turn for refuge in the early seventh century".

Another wave of monastic refugees, bringing with them various Christological controversies, arrived in Rome as the Sassanid Empire ravaged the eastern Byzantine possessions. The following Muslim conquests of the seventh century in effect reversed the "avalanche of ascetics to the East" and the "brain drain of ascetic emigrations to the Holy Land" that followed the Gothic invasions of 408–410. Although the immigrating monastics were relatively small in number, their influence was immense:

"Amidst an atmosphere that warmly welcomed them, the small force of monks and clerics who came to Rome at this time would combine their zeal for Chalcedon, their intellectual acumen and higher learning, and the spiritual authority of the Roman church and the Papacy to mobilize the battle and win the war against the last of the great Christological controversies to confront the church."

=== Monothelitism conflict (638–654) ===
It was regarded as mandatory of a pope-elect to seek the confirmation of his appointment from Constantinople before consecration, often resulting in extremely lengthy delays (Sabinian: 6 months; Boniface III: 1 year; Boniface IV: 10 months; Boniface V: 13 months), due to the difficulty of travel, the Byzantine bureaucracy, and the whims of the emperors. Disputes were often theological; for example, Severinus was not consecrated for 20 months after his election due to his refusal to accept monothelitism, dying only months after he finally received permission to be consecrated in 640. When Greek Pope Theodore attempted to excommunicate two Patriarchs of Constantinople for supporting monothelitism, imperial troops looted the papal treasury in the Lateran Palace, arrested and exiled the papal aristocracy at the imperial court, and desecrated the altar of the papal residence in Constantinople.

Theodore was Greek-Palestinian, the son of the bishop of Jerusalem, chosen for his ability to combat various heresies originating from the East in his native tongue. As a result of Theodore's ability to debate his adversaries in their own language, "never again would the Papacy suffer the sort of embarrassment that had resulted from Honorius's linguistic carelessness". Theodore took the nearly unprecedented measure of appointing Stephen of Dor as apostolic vicar to Palestine, with the intent of deposing the Monothelite bishop successors of Sergius of Joppa. Theodore's deposition of Patriarch Pyrrhus ensured that "Rome and Constantinople were now in schism and at open war" over the Christology that would characterize the Christian empire. A Greek pope excommunicating the Patriarch no doubt proved a "distressing spectacle" for the emperors intent upon restoring religious unity. Theodore's boldness attests to:

"the strong undercurrent of Roman rancor against such heavy-handed use of imperial force emanating from Ravenna since the Maurikios incident [...] enthusiastic acceptance of imperial political authority exercised with such brutality was perceptibly waning".

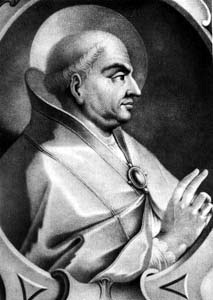
Pope Martin I was abducted by Constans II and died in exile.

Theodore's successor, Pope Martin I insisted on being consecrated immediately without waiting for imperial approval, and was (after a delay due to the revolt of Olympius, the exarch of Ravenna) abducted by imperial troops to Constantinople, found guilty of treason, and exiled to Crimea where he died in 655. Although Martin I's main crime was the promotion of the Lateran Council of 649, the council itself was a "manifestly Byzantine affair" by virtue of its participants and doctrinal influences (particularly its reliance on florilegia). The council's ecumenical status was never acknowledged, for the time solidifying the idea that the convening of ecumenical councils was an imperial prerogative. Within four years of the council's adjournment, both Martin I and Maximus the Confessor were arrested and tried in Constantinople for "transgressing the Typos".

According to Eamon Duffy, "one of the worst elements in Martin's suffering was the knowledge that while he still lived the Roman Church had bowed to imperial commands, and had elected a new pope", Pope Eugenius I. According to Ekonomou, "the Romans were as prepared to forget Pope Martin as Constans II was relieved to see him removed to the remote northern shores of the Black Sea". Thirty years later, the Sixth Ecumenical Council would vindicate the council's condemnation of Monothelitism, but not before the synod "ushered in the period of Rome's "Greek intermezzo'".

=== Reconciliation (654–678) ===
According to Ekonomou, the inhabitants of both East and West had "grown weary of the decades of religious warfare", and the arrest of Martin I did much to dissipate the "religious fever of the empire's Italian subjects". Rapprochement within the empire was viewed as critical to combating the growing Lombard and Arab threat and thus no pope "referred again to Martin I" for seventy-five years. Although the Roman uneasiness of electing a successor while Martin I lived and the Byzantine desire to punish Rome for the council caused the immediate sede vacante to last fourteen months, the next seven popes were more agreeable to Constantinople, and approved without delay, but Pope Benedict II was impelled to wait a year in 684, whereafter the Emperor consented to delegate the approval to the exarch of Ravenna. The exarch, who, invariably, was a Greek from the court of Constantinople, had the power to approve papal consecration from the time of Honorius I.

Emperor Constans II, the abductor of Martin I, resided himself in Rome for a period during the reign of Pope Vitalian. Vitalian's name was entered on the diptychs of the churches in Byzantium—the only name of a pope so entered since the pontificate of Honorius I (d. 638). Vitalian himself was possibly of Eastern extraction, and certainly nominated Greeks to important sees, including Theodore of Tarsus as Archbishop of Canterbury. Much has been said of Constans II's motives—perhaps to move the imperial capital to Rome or to reconquer large swathes of territory in the mold of Justinian I—but more likely he only intended to achieve limited military victories against the Slavs, Lombards, and Arabs. Vitalian heaped upon Constans II honors and ceremony (including a tour of St. Peter's tomb), even while Constans II's workmen were stripping the bronze from the monuments of the city to be melted down and taken to Constantinople with the Emperor when he departed. However, both Vitalian and Constans II would have been confident upon his departure that the political and religious relationship between Rome and Constantinople was effectively stabilized, leaving Constans II free to focus his forces against the Arabs. After Constans II was murdered in Sicily by Mezezius, Vitalian refused to support Mezezius's usurpation of the throne, gaining the favor of Constans II's son and successor, Constantine IV. Constantine IV returned the favor by refusing to support the striking of Vitalian's name from the diptychs of Byzantine churches and depriving Ravenna of autocephalous status, returning it to papal jurisdiction. Nonetheless, Vitalian's successors Adeodatus II was struck off the diptychs in the Monothelite East, a policy which did not change for the succeeding Pope Donus until after Donus' death.

Constantine IV abandoned the policy of monothelitism and summoned the Third Council of Constantinople in 680, to which Pope Agatho sent a representative. The council returned to the Chalcedonian Creed, condemning Pope Honorius and the proponents of monothelitism. Over the next ten years, reconciliation increased the power of papacy: the church of Ravenna abandoned its claim to independent status (formerly endorsed by Constans II), imperial taxation was lessened, and the right of papal confirmation was delegated from Constantinople to the Exarch of Ravenna. It was during this period that the papacy began "thinking of the Universal Church not as the sum of individual churches as the East did, but as synonymous with the Roman Church".

=== Greek Popes (678–752) ===
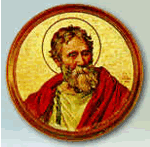
Pope Agatho and ten of his next twelve successors were culturally of Greek extraction.

Pope Agatho, a Greek Sicilian, started "a nearly unbroken succession of Eastern pontiffs spanning the next three quarters of a century". The Third Council of Constantinople and the Greek Popes ushered in "a new era in relations between the eastern and western parts of the empire". During the pontificate of Pope Benedict II (684–685), Constantine IV waived the requirement of imperial approval for consecration as pope, recognizing the sea change in the demographics of the city and its clergy. Benedict II's successor Pope John V was elected "by the general population", returning to the "ancient practice". The ten Greek successors of Agatho were likely the intended result of Constantine IV's concession. The deaths of Pope John V and (even more so) Pope Conon resulted in contested elections, but following Pope Sergius I the remainder of the elections under Byzantine rule were without serious issue.

During the pontificate of John V (685–686), the Emperor substantially lessened the taxation burden on papal patrimonies in Sicily and Calabria, also eliminating the surtax on grains and other imperial taxes. Justinian II during the reign of Conon also decreased taxes on the patrimonies of Bruttium and Lucania, releasing those conscripted into the army as security on those payments. Popes of this period explicitly recognized imperial sovereignty over Rome and sometimes dated their personal correspondence in the regnal years of the Byzantine Emperor. However, this political unity did not also extend to theological and doctrinal questions.

==== Quinisext Council dispute ====
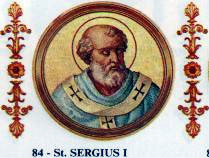
Pope Sergius I's refused to endorse the canons of the Quinisext Council, prompting Justinian II to order his arrest.

Justinian II's initial acts appeared to continue the rapprochement initiated under Constans II and Constantine IV. However, reconciliation was short-lived, and Justinian II convoked the Quinisext Council (692, unattended by Western prelates) which settled upon a variety of decrees "calculated to offend Westerners", the canons of which were sent to Pope Sergius I (in office 687–701) for his signature; Sergius refused and openly flouted the new laws. The key point of contention were the regulations of the Trullan canons, which although primarily targeted at Eastern lapses, conflicted with existing practices in the West. Sergius I would have objected to the approval of all eighty-five Apostolic Canons (rather than only the first fifty), various liberalizations of the issue of clerical celibacy, various prohibitions on blood as food, and the depiction of Christ as a lamb.

Justinian II first sent a magistrate to arrest John of Portus and another papal counselor as a warning, and then dispatched his infamous protospatharios Zacharias to arrest the pope himself. Justinian II attempted to apprehend Sergius I as his predecessor had done with Martin I, underestimating the resentment against imperial authority among those in power in Italy, and the Italian-born troops from Ravenna and the Duchy of the Pentapolis mutinied in favor of Sergius I upon their arrival in Rome. Not long after, Justinian II was deposed in a coup (695). However, the thirteen revolts in Italy and Sicily that preceded the fall of the exarchate in 751 were uniformly "imperial in character" in that they still harbored "allegiance to the ideal of the Christian Roman Empire" and harbored no sovereign political ambitions for the Italian peninsula. Indeed, rather than capitalize on any anti-Byzantine sentiments in Italy, Sergius I himself attempted to quell the entire controversy.

In 705 the restored Justinian II sought to compromise with Pope John VII (in office 705–707) asking him to enumerate the specific canons of the Council he found problematic and to confirm the rest; however, John VII took no action. In 710 Justinian II ordered Pope Constantine (in office 708–715) to appear in Constantinople by imperial mandate. Pope Constantine, a Syrian, left for Constantinople in 710 with thirteen clerics, eleven of them fellow Easterners. Crossing paths with Constantine in Naples was exarch John III Rizocopo, who was on his way to Rome where he would execute four high-ranking papal officials who had refused to accompany the pope. While Rome's rejection of the Trullan canons remained, the visit largely healed the rift between pope and emperor.

Greek was the language of choice during this period as countless Easterners rose through the ranks of the clergy. According to Ekonomou, between 701 and 750, "Greeks outnumbered Latins by nearly three and a half to one". Any power vacuum was swiftly filled from Rome: for example, Pope Gregory II came to the aid of the exarchate of Ravenna in 729 by helping to crush the rebellion of Tiberius Petasius, and Pope Zacharias in 743 and 749 negotiated the withdrawal of the Lombards from imperial territory.

==== Iconoclasm dispute ====
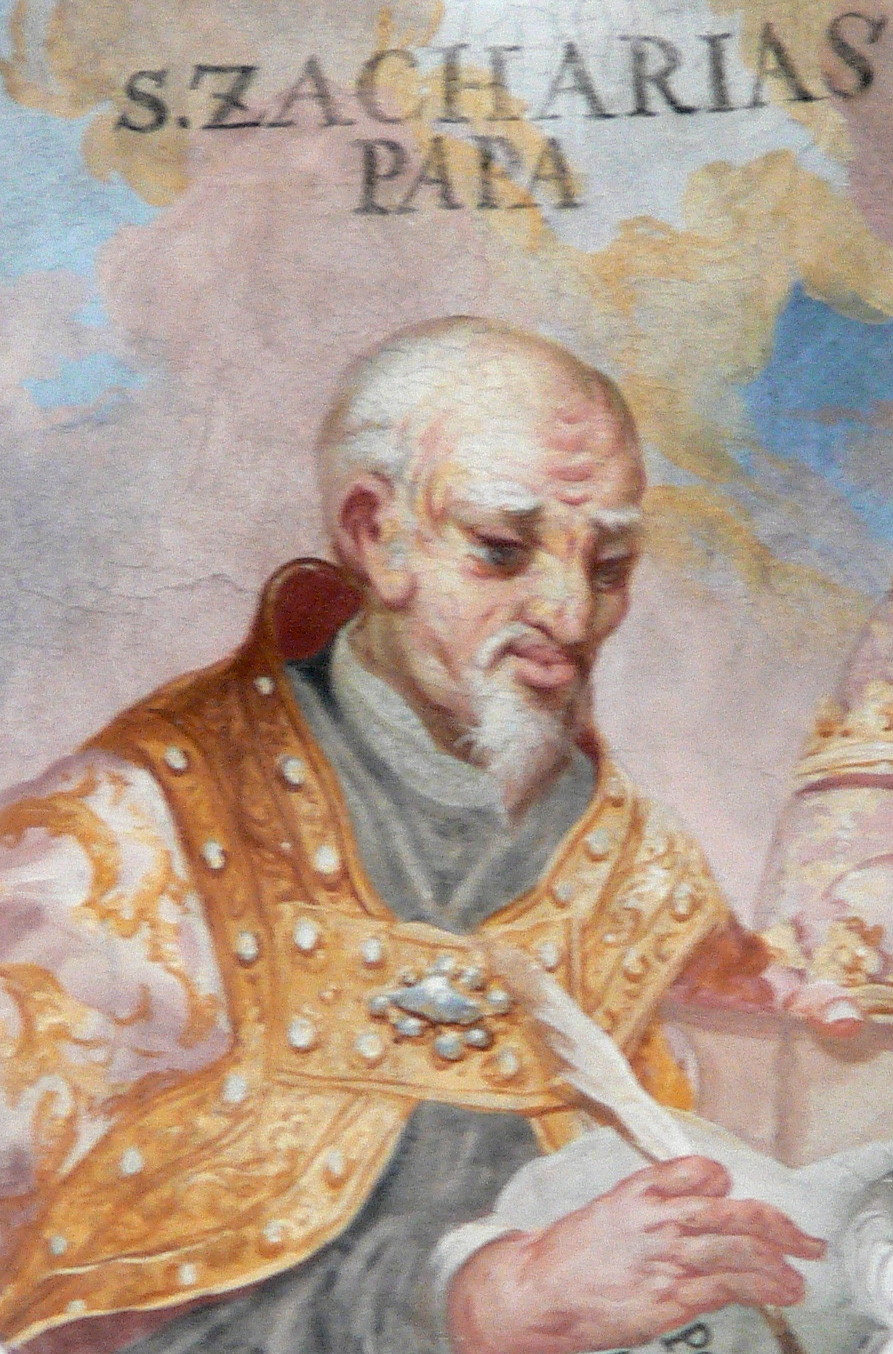
Pope Zachary was the last pope of Greek extraction and the last to seek imperial confirmation of his election.

Popes of the first half of the eighth century perceived Constantinople as a source of legitimating authority and in practice "paid handsomely" to continue to receive imperial confirmation, but Byzantine authority all but vanished in Italy (except for Sicily) as the emperors became increasingly pressed by the Muslim conquests. According to Ekonomou:

"Like every Roman pontiff who had come before him, Zacharias considered himself a loyal servant of the imperium Romanum Christianum and a dutiful subject of the emperor who occupied the throne in Constantinople. The empire was, after all, the terrestrial image of the kingdom of heaven. It was a sacred realm of which Rome and the papacy were integral components. It represented culture and civilization. It was the irrefragable chain that connected the present to the classical past and gave his beloved Rome the aura of eternity. Most of all, it was the empire that guarded and protected the holy catholic and apostolic church. The emperor was God's elected representative on Earth. He held the empire in the name of Christ whose instrument he was and from whom he derived his power and authority. To criticize the emperor was sacrilege; to fail to obey and pray for him, whether he was good or bad, unthinkable impiety."

Although antagonism about the expense of Byzantine domination had long persisted within Italy, the political rupture was set in motion in earnest in 726 by the iconoclasm of Emperor Leo III the Isaurian. The exarch was lynched while trying to enforce the iconoclastic edict and Pope Gregory II saw iconoclasm as the latest in a series of imperial heresies. In 731, his successor, Pope Gregory III organized a synod in Rome (attended by the Archbishop of Ravenna), which declared iconoclasm punishable by excommunication. When the exarch donated six columns of onyx to the shrine of St. Peter in thanks for the pope's assistance in his release from the Lombards, Gregory III defiantly had the material crafted into icons.

=== Final break ===
Emperor Leo III responded in 732/33 by confiscating all papal patrimonies in south Italy and Sicily, together constituting most papal income at the time. He further removed the bishoprics of Thessalonica, Corinth, Syracuse, Reggio, Nicopolis, Athens, and Patras from papal jurisdiction, instead subjecting them to the Patriarch of Constantinople. This was in effect an act of triage: it strengthened the imperial grip on the southern empire, but all but guaranteed the eventual destruction of the exarchate of Ravenna, which finally occurred at Lombard hands in 751. In effect, the papacy had been "cast out of the empire". Pope Zachary, in 741, was the last pope to announce his election to a Byzantine ruler or seek their approval.

== Subsequent relations ==
Within 50 years (Christmas 800), the papacy recognised Charlemagne as Holy Roman Emperor. This can be seen as symbolic of the papacy turning away from the declining Byzantium towards the new power of Carolingian Francia. Byzantium suffered a series of military setbacks during this period, virtually losing its grip on Italy. By the time of Liudprand of Cremona's late-10th-century visits to Constantinople, despite Byzantium's recovery under Romanos I and Constantine VII Porphyrogenitus, relations were clearly strained between the papacy and Byzantium. Indeed, he notes the anger of the Byzantine civil service at the Emperor being addressed by the Pope as "Emperor of the Greeks" as opposed to that of the Romans.

== List of Byzantine popes ==
The Byzantine Papacy was composed of the following popes and antipopes. Of the thirteen popes from 678 to 752, only Benedict II and Gregory II were native Romans; all the rest were Greek-speaking, from Greece, Syria, or Byzantine Sicily. Many popes of this period had previously served as papal apocrisiarii (equivalent of the modern nuncio) in Constantinople. The series of popes from John V to Zachary (685–752) is sometimes referred to as the "Byzantine captivity" because only one pope of this period, Gregory II, was not of "Eastern" extraction.

- Pope Vigilius (537–555), former apocrisiarius
- Pope Pelagius I (556–561), former apocrisiarius
- Pope John III (561–574)
- Pope Benedict I (575–579)
- Pope Pelagius II (579–590)
- Pope Gregory I, "the Great" (590–604), former apocrisiarius
- Pope Sabinian (604–606), former apocrisiarius
- Pope Boniface III (607), former apocrisiarius, likely born in Rome to a Greek father from Antioch
- Pope Boniface IV (608–615)
- Pope Adeodatus I (615–618)
- Pope Boniface V (619–625)
- Pope Honorius I (625–638)
- Pope Severinus (640)
- Pope John IV (640–642), Dalmatian, first pope born and raised east of Italy since Pope Zosimus (417–418)
- Pope Theodore I (642–649), Greek-Palestinian
- Pope Martin I (649–653), former apocrisiarius
- Pope Eugene I (654–657)
- Pope Vitalian (657–672), likely of eastern extraction (father named Anastasios)
- Pope Adeodatus II (672–676)
- Pope Donus (676–678)
- Pope Agatho (678–681), Greek
- Pope Leo II (682–683), Sicilian
- Pope Benedict II (684–685)
- Pope John V (685–686), Syrian
- Pope Conon (686–687), Sicilian
- Pope Sergius I (687–701), Syrian
  - Antipope Theodore (687)
  - Antipope Paschal (687)
- Pope John VI (701–705), Greek
- Pope John VII (705–707), Calabrian
- Pope Sisinnius (708), Syrian
- Pope Constantine (708–715), Syrian
- Pope Gregory II (715–731)
- Pope Gregory III (731–741), Syrian
- Pope Zachary (741–752), Calabrian

== Legacy ==
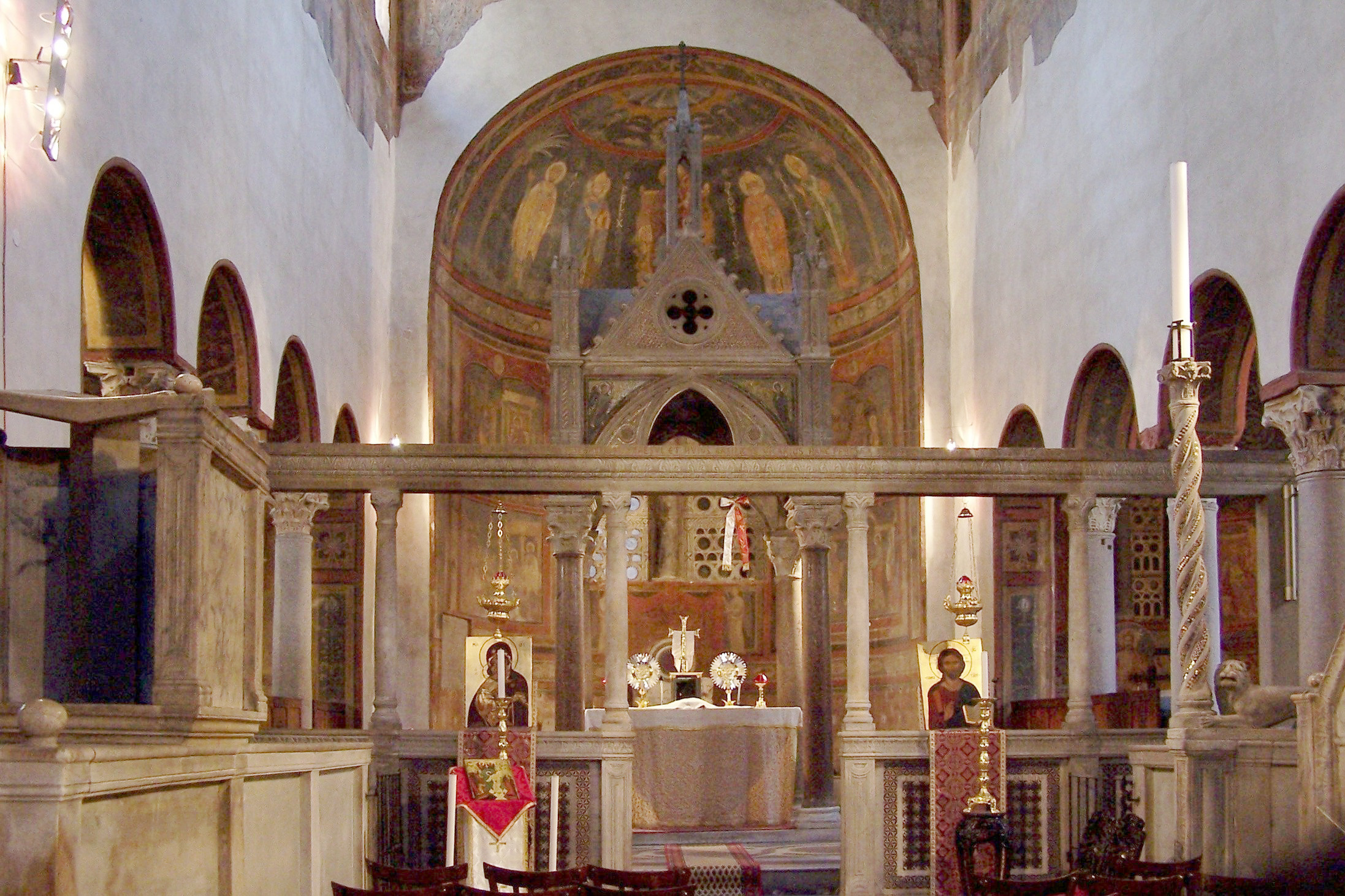
The Byzantine-influenced interior of Santa Maria in Cosmedin

According to Duffy, by the end of the 7th century, "Greek-speakers dominated the clerical culture of Rome, providing its theological brains, its administrative talent, and much of its visual, musical, and liturgical culture". Ekonomou argues that "after four decades of Byzantine rule, the East was inexorably insinuating itself into the city on the Tiber. Even Gregory would succumb, perhaps unwittingly, to the lux orientis [...] Once the political bonds had been reformed, both Rome and the Papacy would quickly begin to experience, even before the sixth century came to a close, its influence in other ways as well." Ekonomou views the Byzantine influence as organic rather than "an intentional or systematic program" by the emperors or exarchs, who focused more on political control and taxation than cultural influence.

=== Demographic and monastic ===
The schola Graeca (also called the ripa Graeca or "Greek bank") refers to the segment of the Tiber's bank "heavily populated by Easterners, including Greeks, Syrians, and Egyptians". The Byzantine quarter quickly became the economic center of Imperial Rome during this period (marked by Santa Maria in Cosmedin, a name also given to Byzantine churches founded in Ravenna and Naples). The portion of the Aventine overlooking this quarter became known as the ad Balcernas or Blachernas, after the district of Constantinople. This region was later called the piccolo Aventino ("little Aventine") once it developed into a "Greco-oriental quarter" after successive waves of Sabaite monks.

Byzantine immigrants to Rome included merchants from Byzantine territories such as Syria and Egypt. Refugees from the Vandal persecutions in North Africa and the Laurentian schism accumulated in significant numbers in the early sixth century; a similar phenomenon occurred with the inhabitants of the eastern territories later re-conquered by the Byzantines. Greeks accounted for nearly the entire medical community of Rome and a Greek school of medicine was established during this time. Most Greek inhabitants of Rome during this period, however, would have been members of monastic religious communities, although it is questionable whether any exclusively Greek monasteries were established. However, by 678, there were four Byzantine monasteries: San Saba, Domus Ariscia, SS. Andreas and Lucia, and Aquas Salvias. Constantine IV alludes to these four monasteries in a letter to Pope Donus; Ekonomou suggests there were at least two more Byzantine monasteries in Rome: the Boetiana and St. Erasmus on Caelian Hill. Greek monastics brought with them (in the late seventh century) the institution of monasteria diaconia, dedicating to serving the indigent of the city.

At the end of the sixth century Easterners remained a minority of the Roman clergy, although they were doubtlessly admitted into it (as determined by the names subscribing to synodical proceedings). Although they constituted less than one percent of the hierarchy at the beginning of the seventh century, the percentage of Easterners was higher for the priesthood. In contrast, a 679 synod convoked by Agatho was predominantly eastern (more than half of the bishops and two-thirds of the priests). These monastics "brought with them from the East an unbroken legacy of learning that, though shattered almost beyond recognition in the West, Byzantium had preserved in nearly pristine form from ancient times".

Non-monks also emigrated to Rome, as can be seen in the skyrocketing popularity of names like Sisinnes, Georgios, Thalassios, and Sergius (and, to a lesser extent: Gregorios, Ioannes, Paschalis, Stephanos, and Theodoros). Ekonomou cites the appearance of these names, along with the disappearance of Probus, Faustus, Venantius, and Importunus as evidence of the "radical transformation in the ethnic composition of the city".

=== Economic ===
Byzantine traders came to dominate the economic life of Rome. Persons from all portions of the Byzantine empire were able to follow traditional trade routes to Rome, making the city truly "cosmopolitan" in its composition.

=== Architectural ===
Greek-speaking prelates also become common in Rome at this time, concentrated around a ring of churches on Palatine Hill, dedicated to Eastern Saints: Cosmas and Damian, Sergius and Bacchus, Hadrian, Quiricius and Giulitta, and Cyrus and John.

Greek influence was concentrated also in the diaconia along the Tiber, an emerging Byzantine quarter of the city, and the churches of San Giorgio in Vellabro and Santa Maria in Cosmedin. According to Duffy,

Even the native traditions of Roman religious art were now transformed by Eastern influence, the monumental realism of the Roman style, represented in the apse of SS Cosmas and Damian, being replaced by the delicate formalism of the paintings of Santa Maria Antiqua, or the Byzantine-style icon of the Virgin now in the church of Santa Francesca Romana. The worship of the Roman Church itself was being transformed by Eastern influence.

Santa Maria in Cosmedin was given to Greek monks fleeing the iconoclastic persecution, and was built on a Greek plan with three apses and a templon barrier, introduced to the West at this period.

=== Literary and musical ===
Rome experienced a "short cultural efflorescence" in the early sixth century as a result of the translation of Greek works—"both sacred and profane"—into Latin, with the rise of an intellectual class fluent in both languages. Because traditional Classical education in Rome had declined "nearly to the point of extinction", even learned Latin scholars could not read such works in their original Greek and were forced to rely on translation. Many such texts appeared in the papal library, which was established by Pope Agapetus I circa 535 (moved by future Pope Gregory I to his monastery on Caelian Hill and later the Lateran). The papal library contained only a very few texts in the year 600, but boasted shelves of codices (primarily in Greek) by 650. Moreover, the staff of the papal chancery was thoroughly bilingual by mid-century, with its "administrative apparatus" run by Greeks. Until recently, scholars believed that papal texts were written in Latin and then translated into Greek; however, the evidence regarding the proceedings of the Lateran Council of 649 reveals exactly the opposite to be the case.

Despite the conquest, the decline of the knowledge of the Greek language continued almost unchecked, and translators remained in short supply throughout Gregory I's papacy. Only at the end of the sixth century did knowledge of the Greek language (and the corresponding supply of Greek texts) undergo a "slightly increased vitality". Conversely, knowledge of Latin in Constantinople was "not only rare but a 'complete anachronism'".

Pope Vitalian (657–672) established a schola cantorum to train ceremonial chanters, which was almost entirely "in imitation of its Byzantine model". Vitalian also introduced the celebration of the Easter vespers and baptism at Epiphany, both traditions originating in Constantinople. The "liturgical byzantinization" furthered by Vitalian would be continued by his successors. However, the Latin language made a liturgical resurgence—officially replacing Greek—between 660 and 682; Greek again re-emerged during the papacy of Pope Agatho and his successors.

By the beginning of the eighth century, bilingual liturgies were common place, with Greek taking precedence. Thus, Greek literary customs found their way into the entire liturgical calendar, particularly papal rituals. This period laid the groundwork for Western mariology, built closely after the cult of Theotokos ("Mother of God") in the East, where Mary was regarded as the special protector of Constantinople.

=== Organizational ===
Many features of the papal court originated during this period, modeled after similar Byzantine court rituals. For example, the papal office of the vestararius imitated the protovestiarios of the Byzantine court, with both responsible for the management of finances and the wardrobe.

=== Theological ===
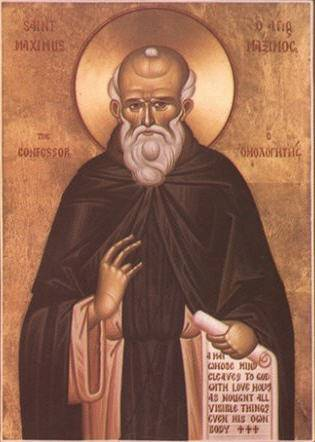
Maximus the Confessor

Western Christendom during this period "absorbed Constantinopolitan liturgical customs and practices into its forms of worship and intercession". Maximus the Confessor, who was carried under heavy imperial guard from Rome to Constantinople in 654, typifies the theological development of Eastern monasticism in Rome vis-a-vis conflicts with the Byzantine emperors. Maximus and his fellow Graeco-Palestinian future Pope Theodore I led a synod in Rome of predominantly Latin bishops that stymied Imperial efforts to enforce doctrinal unity (and thus end the domestic strife which much aided the Persian advance) on the issue of Monothelitism.

As a result of this theological flowering, "for the first time in well over a century, the church of Rome would be in a position to debate theological issues with Byzantium from a position of equality in both intellectual substance and rhetorical form". However, "the irony was that Rome would experience its revitalization not by drawing upon its own pitiable resources, but rather through the collaboration of a Greco-Palestinian pope and a Constantinopolitan monk employing a style of theological discourse whose tradition was purely Eastern".

As early as the papacy of Gregory I, the churches of Italy and Sicily began "increasingly following Eastern ritualistic forms", which Gregory I himself endeavored to combat and modify. For example, Roman churches adopted the practice of saying Allelueia in Mass except during the fifty days between Easter and Pentecost; in a letter, Gregory I acknowledged the development, but claimed it originated in Jerusalem and reached Rome not through Constantinople but through Jerome and Pope Damasus. Similarly, Gregory I claimed an "ancient origin" for allowing subdeacons to participate in mass without tunics (a practice common in Constantinople). Gregory was also keen to distinguish the Latin Kyrie Eleison from the Greek, noting that only Roman clerics (rather than the entire congregation in unison) recited it, and thereafter affixed an additional Christe Eleison.

Despite his vehement public statements to the contrary, Gregory I himself was an agent of creeping Byzantine influence. As Ekonomou states, Gregory "not only reflect but was in many ways responsible for Rome's ambivalent attitude toward the East". For example, he organized a series of liturgical processions in Rome to "assuage the wrath of God and relieve the city's suffering" from the plague which killed his predecessor, which greatly resembled Byzantine liturgical processions which Gregory I would have witnessed as apocrisiarius. Gregory I's mariology also comports with several Byzantine influences. However, it as after the death of Gregory I that Eastern influence became for more apparent and the adoption of Byzantine practices accelerated.

Sergius I incorporated the Syrian custom of singing the Agnus Dei and elaborate processions with Greek chants into the Roman liturgy. The "more learned and sophisticated theological interests" of the Greek popes also added a new "doctrinal edge" to the claims of the primacy of the Roman Pontiff, "sharpened and fixed" by various confrontations with the emperor. Eastern monastics, if not Byzantine society at large, in the fourth and fifth centuries came to regard Rome as "not just another patriarch" but as a unique source of doctrinal authority. According to Ekonomou, the Dialogues "best reflect the impact that the East exercised on Rome and the Papacy in the late sixth century" as they "gave Italy holy men who were part of an unmistakable hagiographical tradition whose roots lay in the Egyptian desert and the Syrian caves".

=== Artistic ===
The Byzantine period saw the disappearance of most remnants of classical style from mosaics in Italy, although the process of this transition is hard to follow, not least because there are even fewer surviving mosaics from the period in the Greek-speaking world than in Italy. (Note: Talbot Rice is more confident than many more recent scholars of the ability to distinguish between Western and Eastern style at this period.) The magnificent sequence of mosaics in Ravenna continued under the Exarchate, with those in the Basilica of San Vitale (527–548, spanning the change of rule) and Basilica of Sant' Apollinare in Classe (549), but no sharp transition of style is detectable from those produced under the Ostrogothic Kingdom or the Western Emperors of the preceding decades. Greek Pope John VII was "by far the most outstanding patron of the Byzantine iconographic style", commissioning innumerable works from "traveling Greek craftsmen".

Four churches in Rome have mosaics of saints near where their relics were held; these all show an abandonment of classical illusionism for large-eyed figures floating in space. They are San Lorenzo fuori le Mura (580s), Sant'Agnese fuori le mura (625–638), Santo Stefano Rotondo (640s), and the chapel of San Venanzio in the Lateran Basilica (c. 640) (Note: All are dated based on the reigns of the Pope who commissioned them.)

Illuminated manuscripts show similar developments, but it is difficult to see specifically Byzantine elements in the emerging medieval style of St Augustine Gospels of c. 595, the earliest Latin Gospel book, which very probably passed through the hands of Gregory I. The earliest estimates for the date of the frescos at Castelseprio in northern Italy, which undoubtedly show strong Byzantine influence, would put them into this period, but most scholars now date them much later. There has been much speculation, in respect of Castelseprio and other works, about Greek artists escaping from iconoclasm to the West, but there is little or no direct evidence of this.

== See also ==
- Caesaropapism
- Jus exclusivae
- Papal appointment
- Rule of the Dukes

== General references ==
- Baumgartner, Frederic J. (2003). Behind Locked Doors: A History of the Papal Elections. Palgrave Macmillan. ISBN 9780312294632.
- Dale, Thomas E.A. (2004). Kleinhenz, Christopher (ed.). Medieval Italy: an Encyclopedia. Routledge. ISBN 9780415939317. Google books
- Duffy, Eamon (1997). Saints & Sinners: A History of the Popes. ISBN 9780300091656.
- Ekonomou, Andrew J. (2007). Byzantine Rome and the Greek Popes: Eastern Influences on Rome and the Papacy from Gregory the Great to Zacharias, A.D. 590–752. Lexington Books. ISBN 9780739119778.
- Kleinhenz, Christopher, ed. (2017). Medieval Italy: An Encyclopedia. Routledge Revivals. Vol. II: L–Z. Taylor & Francis. ISBN 9781351664431.
- Lunt, William E. (1950). Papal Revenues in the Middle Ages. Columbia University Press.
- Talbot Rice, David (1968). Byzantine Art (3rd ed.). Penguin Books.
