= June 27 =

June 27 this year in various calendars
- Saturday, 27 June 2026
Akan	Monomemene
Armenian	12 Hrotich 1475
Aztec	Tepeilhuitl 8, 13 Cōzcacuāuhtli
Babylonian	11 Simanu, 2337 SE
Balinese pawukon	Luang, Pepet, Kajeng, Laba, Keliwon, Maulu, Saniscara of Kuningan, Indra, Dadi, Raja
Bengali	13 Asharh, BS 1433
Chinese	Yang Water Monkey・Root Mansion; Fire Horse Year, Month 5, Day 13 (Xiazhi, 10 days until Xiaoshu)
Common Era	27 June 2026 CE
Coptic	20 Paoni, AM 1742
Egyptian	12 Athyr, 2775 NE
Ethiopian	20 Sanē, 2018 Amätä Məhrät
French Republican	Décade I, Nonidi de Messidor de l'Année 234 de la République
Gregorian	27 June, AD 2026
Hebrew	12 Tamuz, AM 5786
Hindu	Anurādhā・Sādhya; Solar: 13 Āṣāḍha, 1948 SE; Lunisolar: Trayodaśī, Śukla pakṣa of Jyeṣṭha, 2083 VE; Rāudra・5127 KY・1,872,753
Icelandic	Laugardagur, 6 Sólmánuður 2026
Islamic	11 Muharram, AH 1448 (using tabular method)
ISO week date	2026-W26-6
Japanese	13 Satsuki, Reiwa 8 (Geshi, 10 days until Shōsho)
Julian	14 June, AD 2026 (AM 7534)
Julian day	2461219
Korean	13 Maldal, 4359 DE
Maya	13.0.13.12.16; 9 Tzec, 13 Cib
Roman	ante diem XVIII Kalendas Iulias, MMDCCLXXIX AUC
Solar Hijri	6 Tir, SH 1405
Tibetan	13 snron, me pho rta 2153 or 1772 or 1000

<<	June					>>
Su	Mo	Tu	We	Th	Fr	Sa
	1	2	3	4	5	6
7	8	9	10	11	12	13
14	15	16	17	18	19	20
21	22	23	24	25	26	27
28	29	30
2026

June 27 in recent years
2026 (Saturday)
2025 (Friday)
2024 (Thursday)
2023 (Tuesday)
2022 (Monday)
2021 (Sunday)
2020 (Saturday)
2019 (Thursday)
2018 (Wednesday)
2017 (Tuesday)

June 27 is the 178th day of the year (179th in leap years) in the Gregorian calendar; 187 days remain until the end of the year.

== Events ==
=== Pre-1600 ===
- 363 – Jovian is proclaimed Roman emperor following the death of emperor Julian in the previous night.
- 678 – Pope Agatho is consecrated following the death of pope Donus two months prior.
- 1499 – Amerigo Vespucci sights what is now Amapá State in Brazil.
- 1556 – The thirteen Stratford Martyrs are burned at the stake near London for their Protestant beliefs.

=== 1601–1900 ===
- 1743 – In the Battle of Dettingen, George II becomes the last reigning British monarch to participate in a battle.
- 1760 – Anglo-Cherokee War: Cherokee warriors defeat British forces at the Battle of Echoee near present-day Otto, North Carolina.
- 1806 – British forces take Buenos Aires during the first of the British invasions of the River Plate.
- 1844 – Joseph Smith, founder of the Latter Day Saint movement, and his brother Hyrum Smith, are killed by a mob at the Carthage, Illinois jail.
- 1864 – American Civil War: Confederate forces defeat Union forces during the Battle of Kennesaw Mountain during the Atlanta campaign.
- 1895 – The inaugural run of the Baltimore and Ohio Railroad's Royal Blue from Washington, D.C., to New York City, the first U.S. passenger train to use electric locomotives.
- 1898 – The first solo circumnavigation of the globe is completed by Joshua Slocum from Briar Island, Nova Scotia.

=== 1901–present ===
- 1905 – During the Russo-Japanese War, sailors start a mutiny aboard the Russian battleship Potemkin.
- 1914 – The Illinois Monument is dedicated at Cheatham Hill in what is now the Kennesaw Mountain National Battlefield Park.
- 1918 – HMHS Llandovery Castle, traveling from Halifax, Nova Scotia to Liverpool, England, is torpedoed and sunk by SM U-86 who subsequently run down and machine gun survivors in lifeboats. Only twenty-four survive out of 258 crew members and medical staff.
- 1924 – The Johor–Singapore Causeway opens after five years of construction, providing a land connection for road and rail vehicles travelling between Johor and Singapore.
- 1927 – Prime Minister of Japan Tanaka Giichi convenes an eleven-day conference to discuss Japan's strategy in China. The Tanaka Memorial, a forged plan for world domination, is later claimed to be a secret report leaked from this conference.
- 1928 – The Rovaniemi township decree is promulgated, as a result of which Rovaniemi secedes from the old rural municipality as its own market town on January 1, 1929.
- 1941 – Romanian authorities launch one of the most violent pogroms in Jewish history in the city of Iași, resulting in the murder of at least 13,266 Jews.
- 1941 – World War II: German troops capture the city of Białystok during Operation Barbarossa.
- 1944 – World War II: Mogaung is the first place in Burma to be liberated from the Japanese by British Chindits, supported by the Chinese.
- 1946 – In the Canadian Citizenship Act, the Parliament of Canada establishes the definition of Canadian citizenship.
- 1950 – The United States decides to send troops to fight in the Korean War.
- 1954 – The Obninsk Nuclear Power Plant, the Soviet Union's first nuclear power station, opens in Obninsk, near Moscow.
- 1954 – The FIFA World Cup quarterfinal match between Hungary and Brazil, highly anticipated to be exciting, instead turns violent, with three players ejected and further fighting continuing after the game.
- 1957 – Hurricane Audrey makes landfall near the Texas–Louisiana border, killing over 400 people, mainly in and around Cameron, Louisiana.
- 1973 – The President of Uruguay Juan María Bordaberry dissolves Parliament and establishes a dictatorship.
- 1974 – U.S. president Richard Nixon visits the Soviet Union.
- 1976 – Air France Flight 139 (Tel Aviv-Athens-Paris) is hijacked en route to Paris by the PFLP and redirected to Entebbe, Uganda.
- 1977 – France grants independence to Djibouti.
- 1977 – Constitution for the Federation of Earth was adopted by the second session of the World Constituent Assembly, held at Innsbruck, Austria.
- 1980 – The 'Ustica massacre': Itavia Flight 870 crashes in the sea while en route from Bologna to Palermo, Italy, killing all 81 on board.
- 1981 – The Central Committee of the Chinese Communist Party issues its "Resolution on Certain Questions in the History of Our Party Since the Founding of the People's Republic of China", laying the blame for the Cultural Revolution on Mao Zedong.
- 1982 – Space Shuttle Columbia launched from the Kennedy Space Center on the final research and development flight mission, STS-4.
- 1988 – The Gare de Lyon rail accident in Paris, France, kills 56 people.
- 1988 – Villa Tunari massacre: Bolivian anti-narcotics police kill nine to 12 and injure over a hundred protesting coca-growing peasants.
- 1991 – Two days after it had declared independence, Slovenia is invaded by Yugoslav troops, tanks, and aircraft, starting the Ten-Day War.
- 1994 – Members of the Aum Shinrikyo cult release sarin gas in Matsumoto, Japan. Seven people are killed, 660 injured.
- 1995 – Space Shuttle Atlantis launches on STS-71, the first space shuttle mission to dock with the Russian space station Mir.
- 2007 – Tony Blair resigns as British Prime Minister, a position he had held since 1997. Chancellor Gordon Brown succeeds him.
- 2007 – The Brazilian Military Police invades the favelas of Complexo do Alemão in an episode which is remembered as the Complexo do Alemão massacre.
- 2008 – In a highly scrutinized election, President of Zimbabwe Robert Mugabe is re-elected in a landslide after his opponent Morgan Tsvangirai had withdrawn a week earlier, citing violence against his party's supporters.
- 2013 – NASA launches the Interface Region Imaging Spectrograph space probe to observe the Sun.
- 2014 – At least fourteen people are killed when a Gas Authority of India Limited pipeline explodes in the East Godavari district of Andhra Pradesh, India.
- 2015 – Formosa Fun Coast fire: A dust fire occurs at a recreational water park in Taiwan, killing 15 people and injuring 497 others, 199 critically.
- 2017 – A series of powerful cyberattacks using the Petya malware target websites of Ukrainian organizations and counterparts with Ukrainian connections around the globe.
- 2024 – U.S. President Joe Biden debates former U.S. President Donald Trump. Biden's perceived poor performance leads to his withdrawal from the election on July 21.

== Births ==
=== Pre-1600 ===
- 850 – Ibrahim II of Ifriqiya, Aghlabid emir (died 902)
- 1350 – Manuel II Palaiologos, Byzantine emperor (died 1425)
- 1430 – Henry Holland, 3rd Duke of Exeter, Lancastrian leader (died 1475)
- 1462 – Louis XII, king of France (died 1515)
- 1464 – Ernst II of Saxony, Archbishop of Magdeburg (1476–1513) (died 1513)
- 1497 – Ernest I, Duke of Brunswick-Lüneburg (died 1546)
- 1550 – Charles IX, king of France (died 1574)
- 1596 – Maximilian, Prince of Dietrichstein (died 1655)

=== 1601–1900 ===
- 1696 – William Pepperrell, American merchant and soldier (died 1759)
- 1717 – Louis-Guillaume Le Monnier, French botanist and physicist (died 1799)
- 1767 – Alexis Bouvard, French astronomer and academic (died 1843)
- 1805 – Napoléon Coste, French guitarist and composer (died 1883)
- 1806 – Augustus De Morgan, English mathematician and logician (died 1871)
- 1812 – Anna Cabot Lowell Quincy Waterston, American writer (died 1899)
- 1817 – Louise von François, German author (died 1893)
- 1828 – Bryan O'Loghlen, Irish-Australian politician, 13th Premier of Victoria (died 1905)
- 1838 – Bankim Chandra Chattopadhyay, Indian journalist, author, and poet (died 1894)
- 1838 – Paul Mauser, German weapon designer, designed the Gewehr 98 (died 1914)
- 1846 – Charles Stewart Parnell, Irish politician (died 1891)
- 1850 – Jørgen Pedersen Gram, Danish mathematician and academic (died 1919)
- 1850 – Lafcadio Hearn, Greek-Japanese historian and author (died 1904)
- 1862 – May Irwin, Canadian-American actress and singer (died 1938)
- 1865 – John Monash, Australian engineer and general (died 1931)
- 1869 – Kate Carew, American illustrator and journalist (died 1961)
- 1869 – Emma Goldman, Lithuanian-Canadian philosopher and activist (died 1940)
- 1869 – Hans Spemann, German embryologist and academic, Nobel Prize laureate (died 1941)
- 1870 – Frank Rattray Lillie, American zoologist and embryologist (died 1947)
- 1872 – Heber Doust Curtis, American astronomer (died 1942)
- 1872 – Paul Laurence Dunbar, American author, poet, and playwright (died 1906)
- 1880 – Helen Keller, American author, academic, and activist (died 1968)
- 1882 – Eduard Spranger, German philosopher and academic (died 1963)
- 1884 – Gaston Bachelard, French philosopher and poet (died 1962)
- 1885 – Arthur Lismer, English-Canadian painter known for his landscapes (died 1969)
- 1885 – Pierre Montet, French historian and academic (died 1966)
- 1885 – Guilhermina Suggia, Portuguese cellist (died 1950)
- 1886 – Charlie Macartney, Australian cricketer and soldier (died 1958)
- 1888 – Lewis Bernstein Namier, Polish-English historian and academic (died 1960)
- 1888 – Antoinette Perry, American actress and director (died 1946)
- 1892 – Paul Colin, French illustrator (died 1985)
- 1899 – Juan Trippe, American businessman, founded Pan American World Airways (died 1981)
- 1900 – Dixie Brown, British boxer (died 1957)

=== 1901–present ===
- 1901 – Merle Tuve, American geophysicist and academic (died 1982)
- 1905 – Armand Mondou, Canadian ice hockey player (died 1976)
- 1906 – Vernon Watkins, Welsh-American poet and painter (died 1967)
- 1907 – John McIntire, American actor (died 1991)
- 1908 – João Guimarães Rosa, Brazilian physician and author (died 1967)
- 1911 – Marion M. Magruder, American Marine officer, commander of the VMF(N)-533 squadron (died 1997)
- 1912 – E. R. Braithwaite, Guyanese novelist, writer, teacher, and diplomat (died 2016)
- 1913 – Elton Britt, American singer-songwriter and guitarist (died 1972)
- 1913 – Philip Guston, American painter and academic (died 1980)
- 1913 – Willie Mosconi, American pool player (died 1993)
- 1914 – Robert Aickman, English author and activist, co-founded the Inland Waterways Association (died 1981)
- 1914 – Helena Benitez, Filipina academic and administrator (died 2016)
- 1914 – Giorgio Almirante, Italian journalist and politician (died 1988)
- 1915 – Grace Lee Boggs, American philosopher, author, and activist (died 2015)
- 1915 – John Alexander Moore, American zoologist and academic (died 2002)
- 1916 – Robert Normann, Norwegian guitarist (died 1998)
- 1918 – Adolph Kiefer, American swimmer (died 2017)
- 1919 – M. Carl Holman, American author, educator, poet, and playwright (died 1988)
- 1919 – Amala Shankar, Indian danseuse (died 2020)
- 1920 – Fernando Riera, Chilean football player and manager (died 2010)
- 1921 – Muriel Pavlow, English actress (died 2019)
- 1922 – George Walker, American composer (died 2018)
- 1923 – Jacques Berthier, French organist and composer (died 1994)
- 1923 – Elmo Hope, American pianist and composer (died 1967)
- 1924 – Bob Appleyard, English cricketer and businessman (died 2015)
- 1925 – Leonard Lerman, American geneticist and biologist (died 2012)
- 1925 – Doc Pomus, American singer-songwriter (died 1991)
- 1925 – Wayne Terwilliger, American second baseman, coach, and manager (died 2021)
- 1927 – Bob Keeshan, American actor and producer (died 2004)
- 1928 – Rudy Perpich, American dentist and politician, 34th Governor of Minnesota (died 1995)
- 1929 – Dick the Bruiser, American football player and wrestler (died 1991)
- 1929 – Peter Maas, American journalist and author (died 2001)
- 1930 – Ross Perot, American businessman and politician (died 2019)
- 1930 – Tommy Kono, Japanese American weightlifter (died 2016)
- 1931 – Charles Bronfman, Canadian-American businessman and philanthropist
- 1931 – Martinus J. G. Veltman, Dutch physicist and academic, Nobel Prize laureate (died 2021)
- 1932 – Eddie Kasko, American baseball player and manager (died 2020)
- 1932 – Anna Moffo, American operatic soprano (died 2006)
- 1932 – Hugh Wood, English composer (died 2021)
- 1936 – Lucille Clifton, American author and poet (died 2010)
- 1936 – Shirley Anne Field, English actress (died 2023)
- 1937 – Joseph P. Allen, American physicist and astronaut
- 1937 – Otto Herrigel, Namibian lawyer and politician (died 2013)
- 1937 – Kirkpatrick Sale, American author and scholar
- 1938 – Bruce Babbitt, American lawyer and politician, 47th United States Secretary of the Interior
- 1938 – David Hope, Baron Hope of Craighead, Scottish lieutenant and judge
- 1938 – Konrad Kujau, German illustrator (died 2000)
- 1939 – R. D. Burman, Indian singer-songwriter (died 1994)
- 1939 – Neil Hawke, Australian cricketer and footballer (died 2000)
- 1939 – Brereton C. Jones, American politician, 58th Governor of Kentucky (died 2023)
- 1940 – Ian Lang, Baron Lang of Monkton, Scottish politician, Secretary of State for Scotland
- 1941 – Bill Baxley, American lawyer and politician, 24th Lieutenant Governor of Alabama
- 1941 – James P. Hogan, English-Irish author (died 2010)
- 1941 – Krzysztof Kieślowski, Polish director and screenwriter (died 1996)
- 1942 – Bruce Johnston, American singer-songwriter and producer
- 1942 – Frank Mills, Canadian pianist and composer
- 1942 – Danny Schechter, American director, producer, and screenwriter (died 2015)
- 1943 – Ravi Batra, Indian-American economist and academic
- 1944 – Will Jennings, American songwriter (died 2024)
- 1944 – Angela King, English environmentalist and author, co-founded Common Ground
- 1944 – Patrick Sercu, Belgian cyclist (died 2019)
- 1945 – Joey Covington, American drummer, songwriter, and producer (died 2013)
- 1945 – Norma Kamali, American fashion designer
- 1948 – Camile Baudoin, American guitarist
- 1949 – Vera Wang, American fashion designer
- 1951 – Ulf Andersson, Swedish chess player
- 1951 – Julia Duffy, American actress
- 1951 – Gilson Lavis, English drummer and portrait artist
- 1951 – Mary McAleese, Irish academic and politician, 8th President of Ireland
- 1952 – Madan Bhandari, Nepalese politician (died 1993)
- 1953 – Igor Gräzin, Estonian academic and politician
- 1953 – Alice McDermott, American novelist
- 1954 – Richard Ibbotson, English admiral
- 1955 – Isabelle Adjani, French actress
- 1956 – Heiner Dopp, German field hockey player and politician
- 1957 – Gabriella Dorio, Italian runner
- 1958 – Lisa Germano, American singer-songwriter and guitarist
- 1958 – Jeffrey Lee Pierce, American singer-songwriter and guitarist (died 1996)
- 1959 – Dan Jurgens, American author and illustrator
- 1959 – Lorrie Morgan, American singer
- 1960 – Craig Hodges, American basketball player and coach
- 1960 – Michael Mayer, American theatre director
- 1960 – Robert King, English harpsichordist and conductor
- 1960 – Jeremy Swift, English actor
- 1962 – Michael Ball, English actor and singer
- 1962 – Tony Leung Chiu-wai, Hong Kong actor and singer
- 1962 – Sunanda Pushkar, India-born Canadian businesswoman (died 2014)
- 1963 – Wendy Alexander, Scottish politician, Minister for Enterprise and Lifelong Learning
- 1963 – Johnny Benson Jr., American race car driver
- 1964 – Stephan Brenninkmeijer, Dutch director, producer, and screenwriter
- 1964 – Chuck Person, American basketball player and coach
- 1965 – Simon Sebag Montefiore, English journalist, historian, and author
- 1965 – S. Manikavasagam, Malaysian politician and social activist
- 1965 – Óscar Vega, Spanish boxer
- 1966 – J. J. Abrams, American director, producer, and screenwriter
- 1966 – Jörg Bergen, German footballer and manager
- 1966 – Jeff Conine, American baseball player and sportscaster
- 1966 – Aigars Kalvītis, Latvian politician, businessman, and former Prime Minister of Latvia
- 1967 – Sylvie Fréchette, Canadian swimmer and coach
- 1967 – George Hamilton, Northern Irish police officer
- 1967 – Vasiliy Kaptyukh, Belarusian discus thrower
- 1967 – Phil Kearns, Australian rugby player and sportscaster
- 1968 – Kelly Ayotte, American lawyer and politician, Governor of New Hampshire
- 1969 – Viktor Petrenko, Ukrainian figure skater
- 1970 – Régine Cavagnoud, French skier (died 2001)
- 1970 – John Eales, Australian rugby player and businessman
- 1970 – Jim Edmonds, American baseball player and sportscaster
- 1970 – Jo Frost, English nanny, television personality, and author
- 1971 – Serginho, Brazilian footballer
- 1972 – Dawud Wharnsby, Canadian singer-songwriter, guitarist, and producer
- 1973 – Abbath Doom Occulta, Norwegian musician
- 1973 – Simon Archer, English badminton player
- 1974 – Christian Kane, American singer-songwriter and actor
- 1974 – Christopher O'Neill, English-American businessman
- 1975 – Ace Darling, American wrestler
- 1975 – Bianca Del Rio, American drag queen and comedian
- 1975 – Sarah Evanetz, Canadian swimmer
- 1975 – Tobey Maguire, American actor
- 1975 – Daryle Ward, American baseball player
- 1976 – Johnny Estrada, American baseball player
- 1976 – Leigh Nash, American singer-songwriter
- 1977 – Arkadiusz Radomski, Polish footballer
- 1978 – Apparat, German musician
- 1979 – Martin Bourboulon, French film director and screenwriter
- 1980 – Hugo Campagnaro, Argentinian footballer
- 1980 – Jennifer Goodridge, American keyboard player
- 1980 – Alexander Peya, Austrian tennis player
- 1980 – Kevin Pietersen, South African-English cricketer
- 1980 – Craig Terrill, American football player
- 1981 – Andrew Embley, Australian footballer
- 1982 – Laura Dre, German-Filipina electronic musician, singer-songwriter and music producer
- 1983 – Jim Johnson, American baseball player
- 1983 – Dale Steyn, South African cricketer
- 1983 – Nikola Rakočević, Serbian actor
- 1984 – Aiden Blizzard, Australian cricketer
- 1984 – Khloé Kardashian, American model, businesswoman, and radio host
- 1984 – D.J. King, Canadian ice hockey player
- 1984 – Gökhan Inler, Swiss footballer
- 1985 – James Hook, Welsh rugby player
- 1985 – Svetlana Kuznetsova, Russian tennis player
- 1985 – Nico Rosberg, German race car driver
- 1986 – Sam Claflin, British actor
- 1986 – Drake Bell, American singer-songwriter, guitarist, and actor
- 1986 – Bryan Fletcher, American skier
- 1986 – LaShawn Merritt, American sprinter
- 1987 – India de Beaufort, English actress
- 1987 – Ed Westwick, English actor
- 1988 – Stefani Bismpikou, Greek gymnast
- 1988 – Matthew Spiranovic, Australian footballer
- 1988 – Kate Ziegler, American swimmer
- 1989 – Hana Birnerová, Czech tennis player
- 1989 – Sabino Brunello, Italian chess grandmaster
- 1989 – Matthew Lewis, English actor
- 1990 – Bobby Wagner, American football player
- 1991 – Oliver Stark, British actor
- 1992 – Ahn So-hee, South Korean singer and actress
- 1992 – Karthika Nair, Indian actress
- 1993 – Johanna Talihärm, Estonian biathlete
- 1993 – Alberto Campbell-Staines, Australian athlete
- 1994 – Anita Husarić, Bosnian tennis player
- 1995 – Monté Morris, American basketball player
- 1997 – Yordan Alvarez, Cuban baseball player
- 1997 – Jehyve Floyd, American basketball player
- 1997 – Dalton Eatherly, American livestreamer, better known as Chud the Builder
- 1997 – H.E.R., American singer-songwriter
- 1999 – Will Levis, American football player
- 1999 – Chandler Riggs, American actor
- 2000 – Chris Olave, American football player
- 2002 – Kelee Ringo, American football player

== Deaths ==
=== Pre-1600 ===
- 992 – Conan I of Rennes, Duke of Brittany
- 1162 – Odo II, Duke of Burgundy (born 1118)
- 1194 – King Sancho VI of Navarre (born 1132)
- 1296 – Floris V, Count of Holland (born 1254)
- 1458 – Alfonso V of Aragon (born 1396)
- 1497 – Michael An Gof, rebel leader
- 1497 – Thomas Flamank, rebel leader
- 1574 – Giorgio Vasari, Italian historian, painter, and architect (born 1511)

=== 1601–1900 ===
- 1601 – Henry Norris, 1st Baron Norreys (born 1525)
- 1603 – Jan Dymitr Solikowski, Polish archbishop (born 1539)
- 1627 – John Hayward, English historian, journalist, and politician (born 1564)
- 1636 – Date Masamune, Japanese strongman (born 1567)
- 1654 – Johannes Valentinus Andreae, German theologian (born 1586)
- 1655 – Eleonora Gonzaga, Holy Roman Empress (born 1598)
- 1672 – Roger Twysden, English historian and politician (born 1597)
- 1720 – Guillaume Amfrye de Chaulieu, French poet and author (born 1639)
- 1729 – Élisabeth Jacquet de La Guerre, French harpsichord player and composer (born 1665)
- 1794 – Wenzel Anton, Prince of Kaunitz-Rietberg (born 1711)
- 1794 – Philippe de Noailles, French general (born 1715)
- 1827 – Johann Gottfried Eichhorn, German theologian and academic (born 1754)
- 1829 – James Smithson, English chemist and mineralogist (born 1765)
- 1831 – Sophie Germain, French mathematician and physicist (born 1776)
- 1831 – Konstantin Pavlovich, grand duke of Russia and the son of Emperor Paul I of Russia (born 1779)
- 1839 – Ranjit Singh, founder of the Sikh Empire (born 1780)
- 1844 – Hyrum Smith, American religious leader (born 1800)
- 1844 – Joseph Smith, American religious leader, founded the Latter Day Saint movement (born 1805)
- 1878 – Sidney Breese, American jurist and politician (born 1800)
- 1894 – Giorgio Costantino Schinas, Maltese architect and civil engineer (born 1834)
- 1896 – John Berryman, English soldier, Victoria Cross recipient (born 1825)

=== 1901–present ===
- 1905 – Harold Mahony, Scottish-Irish tennis player (born 1867)
- 1907 – Elizabeth Cabot Agassiz, American educator, co-founded Radcliffe College (born 1822)
- 1911 – Victor Surridge, English motorcycle racer (born 1882)
- 1912 – George Bonnor, Australian cricketer (born 1855)
- 1917 – Karl Allmenröder, German soldier and pilot (born 1896)
- 1919 – Peter Sturholdt, American boxer (born 1885)
- 1920 – Adolphe-Basile Routhier, Canadian lawyer and judge (born 1839)
- 1934 – Francesco Buhagiar, Maltese politician, 2nd Prime Minister of Malta (born 1876)
- 1935 – Eugene Augustin Lauste, French-American inventor (born 1857)
- 1944 – Milan Hodža, Czech journalist and politician, 10th Prime Minister of Czechoslovakia (born 1878)
- 1946 – Wanda Gág, American author and illustrator (born 1893)
- 1948 – Dorothea Bleek, South African anthropologist and philologist (born 1873)
- 1949 – Frank Smythe, English botanist and mountaineer (born 1900)
- 1950 – Milada Horáková, Czech politician, victim of judicial murder (born 1901)
- 1952 – Max Dehn, German-American mathematician and academic (born 1878)
- 1957 – Hermann Buhl, Austrian soldier and mountaineer (born 1924)
- 1960 – Lottie Dod, English tennis player, golfer, and archer (born 1871)
- 1960 – Harry Pollitt, British politician and Secretary General of the Communist Party of Great Britain (born 1890)
- 1962 – Paul Viiding, Estonian author, poet, and critic (born 1904)
- 1967 – Jaan Lattik, Estonian pastor and politician, 9th Minister of Foreign Affairs of Estonia (born 1878)
- 1970 – Daniel Kinsey, American hurdler and scholar (born 1902)
- 1973 – Ida Mett, Belarusian Jewish anarchist (born 1901)
- 1975 – G.I. Taylor, English mathematician and physicist (born 1886)
- 1977 – Arthur Perdue, American businessman (born 1885)
- 1986 – George Nēpia, New Zealand rugby player and referee (born 1905)
- 1989 – A. J. Ayer, English philosopher and academic (born 1910)
- 1991 – Milton Subotsky, American-English screenwriter and producer (born 1921)
- 1996 – Albert R. Broccoli, American film producer (born 1909)
- 1998 – Gilles Rocheleau, Canadian businessman and politician (born 1935)
- 1999 – Georgios Papadopoulos, Greek colonel and politician, 169th Prime Minister of Greece (born 1919)
- 2000 – Pierre Pflimlin, French lawyer and politician, Prime Minister of France (born 1907)
- 2001 – Tove Jansson, Finnish author, illustrator, and painter (born 1914)
- 2001 – Jack Lemmon, American actor (born 1925)
- 2001 – Joan Sims, English actress (born 1930)
- 2002 – John Entwistle, English singer-songwriter, bass guitarist, and producer (born 1944)
- 2002 – Robert L. J. Long, American admiral (born 1920)
- 2003 – David Newman, American director, producer, and screenwriter (born 1937)
- 2004 – George Patton IV, American general (born 1923)
- 2004 – Darrell Russell, American race car driver (born 1968)
- 2005 – Shelby Foote, American historian and author (born 1916)
- 2005 – Ray Holmes, English lieutenant and pilot (born 1914)
- 2005 – John T. Walton, American businessman, co-founded the Children's Scholarship Fund (born 1946)
- 2006 – Eileen Barton, American singer (born 1924)
- 2006 – Ángel Maturino Reséndiz, Mexican serial killer (born 1960)
- 2007 – William Hutt, Canadian actor (born 1920)
- 2008 – Sam Manekshaw, Indian field marshal (born 1914)
- 2009 – Gale Storm, American actress (born 1922)
- 2010 – Corey Allen, American film and television actor, writer, director, and producer (born 1934)
- 2011 – Mike Doyle, English footballer (born 1946)
- 2012 – Stan Cox, English runner (born 1918)
- 2012 – Rosemary Dobson, Australian poet and illustrator (born 1920)
- 2013 – Stefano Borgonovo, Italian footballer (born 1964)
- 2013 – Ian Scott, English-New Zealand painter (born 1945)
- 2014 – Edmond Blanchard, Canadian jurist and politician (born 1954)
- 2014 – Allen Grossman, American poet, critic, and academic (born 1932)
- 2014 – Leslie Manigat, Haitian educator and politician, 43rd President of Haiti (born 1930)
- 2014 – Violet Milstead, Canadian World War II aviator and bush pilot (born 1919)
- 2014 – Rachid Solh, Lebanese politician, 48th Prime Minister of Lebanon (born 1926)
- 2015 – Zvi Elpeleg, Polish-Israeli diplomat, author, and academic (born 1926)
- 2015 – Knut Helle, Norwegian historian and professor (born 1930)
- 2015 – Chris Squire, English musician (bass guitarist), singer and songwriter, member of the rock band Yes (born 1948)
- 2016 – Bud Spencer, Italian swimmer, actor, and screenwriter (born 1929)
- 2017 – Peter L. Berger, Austrian sociologist (born 1929)
- 2018 – Joe Jackson, American manager, father of Michael Jackson and Janet Jackson (born 1928)
- 2018 – Liz Jackson, Australian journalist and former barrister (born 1951)
- 2018 – William McBride, Australian obstetrician (born 1927)
- 2024 – Kinky Friedman, American country musician (born 1944)
- 2024 – Martin Mull, American actor (born 1943)
- 2026 – K. Bhagyaraj, Indian film and television actor, writer, director, and producer (born 1953)

== Holidays and observances ==
- Christian feast day:
  - Arialdo
  - Crescens, one of the Seventy disciples
  - Cyril of Alexandria (Coptic Church, Roman Catholic Church, Anglican Communion and Lutheran Church)
  - Hemma of Gurk
  - Gundenis
  - Blessed Louise-Thérèse de Montaignac de Chauvance
  - Marguerite Bays
  - Our Lady of Perpetual Help
  - Sampson the Hospitable
  - Zoilus
  - June 27 (Eastern Orthodox liturgics)
- Canadian Multiculturalism Day (Canada)
- Commemoration Day for the Victims of the Communist Regime (Czech Republic)
- Day of Turkmen Workers of Culture and Art and poetry of Magtymguly Pyragy (Turkmenistan)
- Helen Keller Day (United States)
- International Day of Deafblindness
- Independence Day, celebrates the independence of Djibouti from France in 1977.
- Mixed Race Day (Brazil)
- National PTSD Awareness Day (United States)
- Seven Sleepers' Day or Siebenschläfertag (Germany)
- Unity Day (Tajikistan)
