= Pope Sergius I =

Head of the Catholic Church from 687 to 701

Pope Saint Sergius I
- Bishop of Rome
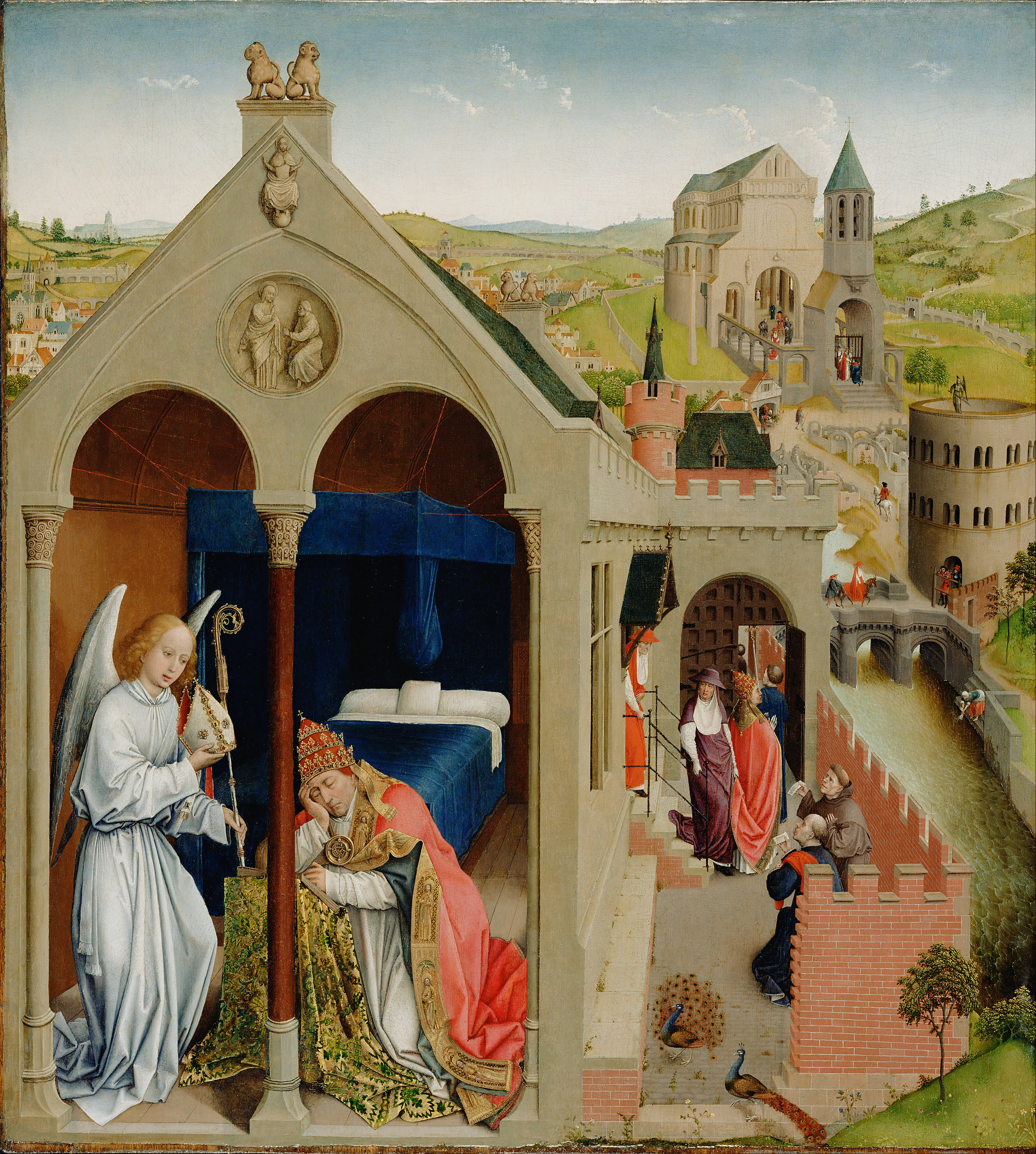
- The Dream of Pope Sergius from the 1430s Saint Hubert Altarpiece by Rogier van der Weyden and his studio
- Church: Catholic Church
- Papacy began: 15 December 687
- Papacy ended: 8 September 701
- Predecessor: Conon
- Successor: John VI
- Previous post: Cardinal-Priest of Santa Susanna (683–687)

Orders
- Created cardinal: 27 June 683 by Leo II

Personal details
- Born: c. 650 Panormus, Sicily, Byzantine Empire
- Died: 8 September 701 (aged around 51) Rome, Byzantine Empire

Pope Sergius I (c. 650 – 8 September 701) was the bishop of Rome from 15 December 687 to his death on 8 September 701, and is revered as a saint by the Roman Catholic Church. He was elected at a time when two rivals, Paschal and Theodore, were locked in a dispute about which of them should become pope. His papacy was dominated by his response to the Quinisext Council, the canons of which he steadfastly refused to accept. Thereupon Emperor Justinian II ordered Sergius's arrest, but the Roman people and the Italian militia of the exarch of Ravenna refused to allow the exarch to bring Sergius to Constantinople.

== Early life ==
Sergius I came from an Antiochene Syrian family which had settled at Panormus in Sicily. Sergius left Sicily and arrived in Rome during the pontificate of Adeodatus II. He may have been among the many Sicilian clergy in Rome due to the Caliphate's attacks on Sicily in the mid-7th century. Pope Leo II ordained him cardinal-priest of Santa Susanna on 27 June 683, and he rose through the ranks of the clergy. He remained cardinal-priest of Santa Susanna until he was selected to become pope.

== Election ==
Pope Conon died on 21 September 687 after a long illness and a reign of less than a year. His archdeacon, Paschal, had already attempted to secure the papacy by bribing the exarch of Ravenna, John II Platyn. A more numerous faction wanted the archpriest Theodore to become pope. The two factions entered into armed combat, each in possession of part of the Lateran Palace, which was the papal residence. To break the deadlock, a group of civic authorities, army officers, clergy, and other citizens met in the Palatine imperial palace, elected Sergius, and then stormed the Lateran, forcing the two rival candidates to accept Sergius.

Though pretending to accept Sergius, Paschal sent messengers to Platyn, promising a large sum of gold in exchange for military support. The exarch arrived, recognised that Sergius had been regularly elected, but demanded the gold anyway. After Sergius's consecration on 15 December 687, Platyn departed. Paschal continued his intrigues and was eventually confined to a monastery on charges of witchcraft. Sergius's consecration ended the last disputed sede vacante of the Byzantine Papacy.

== Papacy ==
On 10 April 689, Sergius baptised King Cædwalla of Wessex in Rome. He also ordained Willibrord as bishop of the Frisians. After Berhtwald was consecrated archbishop of Canterbury by Archbishop Godwin of Lyon, he travelled to Rome and received the pallium from Pope Sergius. Sergius was active in ending the Schism of the Three Chapters with Old Aquileia in 698. He founded the diaconia of Santa Maria in Via Lata on Via del Corso, encompassing a city quarter that developed in the 8th century. He also "restored and embellished" the Eastern church of Santi Cosma e Damiano.

Sergius I did not attend the Quinisext Council of 692, which was attended by 226 or 227 bishops, overwhelmingly from the Patriarchate of Constantinople. The participation of Basil of Gortyna in Crete, belonging to the Patriarchate of Rome, has been seen in the East as representing Rome and even as signifying Roman approval, but he was in fact not a papal legate. Sergius rejected the canons of the council as invalid and declared that he would "rather die than consent to erroneous novelties". Though a loyal subject of the Empire, he would not be "its captive in matters of religion". Writers such as Andrew J. Ekonomou have speculated on which canons, in particular, Sergius found objectionable. Ekonomou excludes the anathemising of Pope Honorius I, the declaration of Constantinople as equal in privileges but second in honour to Rome. All popes since Leo the Great had adamantly rejected the 28th canon of the Council of Chalcedon, which on the basis of political considerations tried to raise the ecclesiastical status of the Patriarchate of Constantinople to equality with that of old Rome. Ekonomou mentions rather the approval by the Quinisext Council of all 85 Apostolic Canons, of which Sergius would have supported only the first 50.

Many of the regulations that the Quinisext Council enacted were aimed at making uniform the existing church practices regarding ritual observance and clerical discipline. Being held under Byzantine auspices, with an exclusively Eastern clergy, the council regarded the customs of the Church of Constantinople as the orthodox practice. Practices in the Church in the West that had got the attention of the Eastern patriarchates were condemned, such as: the practice of celebrating Mass on weekdays in Lent (rather than having pre-sanctified liturgies); of fasting on Saturdays throughout the year; of omitting the "Alleluia" in Lent; of depicting Christ as a lamb. In a step that was symbolically important in view of the council's prohibition of depicting Christ as a Lamb, Sergius introduced into the liturgy the chant "Lamb of God, you take away the sins of the world, have mercy on us" at the breaking of the Host during Mass, and restored the damaged facade mosaic in the atrium of Saint Peter's that depicted the Worship of the Lamb. The Agnus Dei would have been chanted in both Greek and Latin during this period, in the same manner as the other liturgical changes of Sergius. Larger disputes were revealed regarding Eastern and Western attitudes toward celibacy for priests and deacons, with the Council affirming the right of married men to become priests and prescribing excommunication for anyone who attempted to separate a clergyman from his wife, or for any cleric who abandoned his wife.

Enraged, Emperor Justinian II dispatched his magistrianus, also named Sergius, to arrest Bishop John of Portus, the chief papal legate to the Third Council of Constantinople, and Boniface, the papal counsellor. The two high-ranking officials were brought to Constantinople as a warning to the pope. Eventually, Justinian ordered Sergius's arrest and abduction to Constantinople by his notoriously violent bodyguard protospatharios Zacharias. However, the militia of the exarch of Ravenna and the Duchy of Pentapolis frustrated the attempt. Zacharias nearly lost his own life in an attempt to arrest Sergius. Rather than seizing upon the anti-Byzantine sentiment, Sergius did his best to quell the uprising.

Pope Sergius rejected the Apostolic Canons approved by the Eastern Church's Council in Trullo in 692, which made 3 Maccabees part of the Biblical canon. This remains a difference between the Catholic and Orthodox canon to today.

== Death ==
Sergius died on 8 September 701. He was succeeded by John VI.

== Notes ==
Catholic Church titles
Preceded by Conon	Pope; 687–701	Succeeded by John VI
