= Sant'Erasmo al Celio =

Sant'Erasmo al Celio (or sul Celio) was a Benedictine monastery dedicated to Saint Erasmus on the Caelian Hill in Rome. It lay across from Santo Stefano Rotondo beside the Aqua Claudia. It is first mentioned in connection with the election of one of its monks to the papacy as Adeodatus II in 672. It was probably much more ancient.

Sant'Erasmo was a dependency of the monastery of Subiaco. It was the scene of rioting following the disputed papal election of 687 between Paschal and Theodore. In 799, Pope Leo III was briefly imprisoned there. It had been abandoned by February 938, when its property was confirmed to belong to Subiaco by Pope Leo VII, acting on the advice of Prince Alberic of Rome. There were olive and apple trees on the site at the time.

Some vestiges of the monastery were still visible in the 19th century.
