= 678 =

Calendar year

678 in various calendars
- Gregorian calendar: 678; DCLXXVIII
- Ab urbe condita: 1431
- Armenian calendar: 127; ԹՎ ՃԻԷ
- Assyrian calendar: 5428
- Balinese saka calendar: 599–600
- Bengali calendar: 84–85
- Berber calendar: 1628
- Buddhist calendar: 1222
- Burmese calendar: 40
- Byzantine calendar: 6186–6187
- Chinese calendar: 丁丑年 (Fire Ox); 3375 or 3168 — to — 戊寅年 (Earth Tiger); 3376 or 3169
- Coptic calendar: 394–395
- Discordian calendar: 1844
- Ethiopian calendar: 670–671
- Hebrew calendar: 4438–4439
- Hindu calendars
- Vikram Samvat: 734–735
- Shaka Samvat: 599–600
- Kali Yuga: 3778–3779
- Holocene calendar: 10678
- Iranian calendar: 56–57
- Islamic calendar: 58–59
- Japanese calendar: Hakuchi 29 (白雉２９年)
- Javanese calendar: 570–571
- Julian calendar: 678; DCLXXVIII
- Korean calendar: 3011
- Minguo calendar: 1234 before ROC 民前1234年
- Nanakshahi calendar: −790
- Seleucid era: 989/990 AG
- Thai solar calendar: 1220–1221
- Tibetan calendar: མེ་མོ་གླང་ལོ་ (female Fire-Ox); 804 or 423 or −349 — to — ས་ཕོ་སྟག་ལོ་ (male Earth-Tiger); 805 or 424 or −348

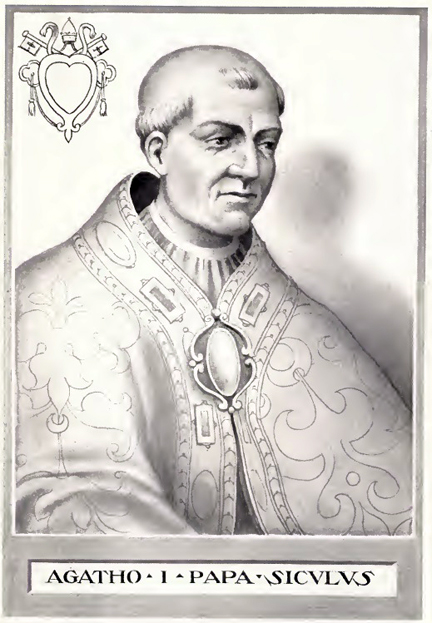
Pope Agatho I (678–681)

Year 678 (DCLXXVIII) was a common year starting on Friday of the Julian calendar. The denomination 678 for this year has been used since the early medieval period, when the Anno Domini calendar era became the prevalent method in Europe for naming years.

== Events ==
=== By place ===
==== Byzantine Empire ====
- July 27 – The Siege of Thessalonica (676–678) ends, when the Sclaveni withdraw.
- Autumn – Siege of Constantinople: Emperor Constantine IV confronts the Arab besiegers in a head-on engagement. The Byzantine fleet, equipped with Greek fire, destroys the Muslim fleet at Sillyon, ending the Arab threat to Europe, and forcing Yazid (a son of caliph Muawiyah I) to lift the siege on land and sea. The victory also frees up forces that are sent to raise the two-year siege of Thessalonica by the local Slavic tribes.

==== Britain ====
- King Æthelred of Mercia defeats the Northumbrian forces under King Ecgfrith, in a battle near the River Trent. Archbishop Theodore helps to resolve differences between the two, Æthelred agreeing to pay a weregild to avoid any resumption of hostilities (approximate date).

==== Japan ====
- April 27 – Emperor Tenmu holds divination for the purpose of proceeding to the Abstinence Palace.
- May 3 – Princess Tōchi suddenly takes ill and dies within the palace. Tenmu, her father, is unable to sacrifice to the Gods of Heaven and Earth.
- May 10 – Tōchi is buried at a place which could be Akō (Hyōgo Prefecture). Tenmu is graciously pleased to raise lament for her.

=== By topic ===
==== Religion ====
- Wilfrid, bishop of York, is at the height of his power and owns vast estates throughout Northumbria. After his refusal to agree to a division of his see, Ecgfrith and Theodore, archbishop of Canterbury, have him banished from Northumbria.
- April 11 – Pope Donus dies at Rome, after a reign of 1 year and 160 days. He is succeeded by Agatho I, who becomes the 79th pope. He is the first pope to stop paying tribute to Emperor Constantine IV upon election.
- In Japan, the national worshiping to the Gods of Heaven and Earth is planned. Tenmu tries to select his daughter Tōchi as a Saiō to make her serve the Gods. However, Tōchi suddenly takes ill and dies.
- The Beomeosa temple complex in Geumjeong-gu (modern South Korea) is constructed, during the reign of King Munmu of Silla.

== Births ==
- Childebert III, Merovingian Frankish king and son of Theuderic III
- Childebrand I, duke of Burgundy (d. 751)
- Kʼinich Ahkal Moʼ Nahb III, Maya ruler of Palenque

== Deaths ==
- April 11 – Pope Donus
- May 3 – Tōchi, Japanese princess
- Abdullah ibn Aamir, Arab general (b. 626)
- Aisha, wife of Muhammad
- Arbogast, bishop of Strasbourg
- Nathalan, Scottish bishop
- Wechtar, Lombard duke of Friuli
- Zhang Wenguan, chancellor of the Tang dynasty (b. 606)
