= Pope John V =

Head of the Catholic Church from 685 to 686

- Bishop of Rome
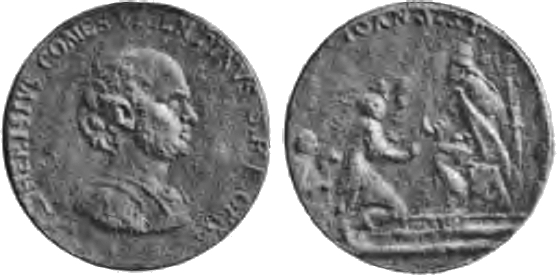
- Pope John V depicted enthroned on Roman Catholic coinage
- Church: Catholic Church
- Papacy began: July 23, 685
- Papacy ended: August 2, 686
- Predecessor: Benedict II
- Successor: Conon

Personal details
- Born: Antioch, Byzantine Empire (modern-day Antakya, Hatay, Turkey)
- Died: 2 August 686 Rome, Byzantine Empire (modern-day Italy)

Pope John V (Latin: Ioannes V; died 2 August 686) was the bishop of Rome from 23 July 685 to his death on 2 August 686. He was the first pope of the Byzantine Papacy consecrated without prior imperial consent, and the first in a line of ten consecutive popes of Eastern origin. His papacy was marked by reconciliation between the city of Rome and the Empire.

== Early life ==
John was born in Antioch and was of Syrian origin. He was named papal legate to the Third Council of Constantinople in 680.

== Papacy ==
John V was the first Pope of the Byzantine Papacy consecrated without the direct imperial approval. Emperor Constantine IV had done away with the requirement during the pontificate of Benedict II, John V's predecessor, providing that "the one elected to the Apostolic See may be ordained pontiff from that moment and without delay". In a return to the "ancient practice", John V was elected in July 685 "by the general population" of Rome. Constantine IV doubtlessly trusted that the population and clergy of Rome had been sufficiently Easternized, and indeed the next ten pontiffs were of Eastern descent.

John V's papacy saw a continuation of improving relations with Byzantium. The Emperor greatly reduced taxes on the papal patrimonies of Sicily and Calabria and abolished other taxes, such as a surtax on grain that had been paid only with difficulty in recent years. A letter from Justinian II assured John V that a "synod of high-ranking civil and ecclesiastical officials", including the apocrisiarius and the Byzantine military, had read and thereafter sealed the text of the Third Council of Constantinople, to prevent any alteration to its canons. The letter was addressed to "John pope of the city of Rome", written while the Emperor believed the pope to still be alive, but received by Pope Conon.

Like his immediate predecessors, John V was unusually generous towards the diaconies of Rome, distributing 1,900 solidi to "all the clergy, the monastic diaconies, and the mansionarii" for the poor.

== Death ==
After a pontificate of little more than a year, John V died in his bed in August 686, giving rise to a "heated debate over his successor". The clergy favored an archpriest named Peter, while the army supported another priest, Theodore. The faction of the clergy gathered outside the Constantinian basilica and the faction of the military met in the Church of St. Stephen. Shuttle diplomacy proved futile and eventually the clergy elected Conon, a Greco-Sicilian.

John V was buried among the papal tombs in Old St. Peter's Basilica. His inscription praised him for combating Monothelitism at the Third Council of Constantinople "with the titles of the faith, keeping such vigilance, you united the minds so that the inimical wolf mixing in might not seize the sheep, or the more powerful crush those below". John V's tomb was destroyed during the Arab raid against Rome in 846.

== Notes ==
Catholic Church titles
Preceded by Benedict II	Pope; 685–686	Succeeded by Conon
