= National PTSD Awareness Day =

Annual observance

National PTSD Awareness Day is a United States observance on June 27 to raise public awareness about post-traumatic stress disorder (PTSD) and its available treatments. The U.S. Senate established the observance in 2010. The entire month of June is also recognized as PTSD Awareness Month.

== History ==
The United States Senate designated June 27, 2010, as National Post-Traumatic Stress Disorder Awareness Day in Senate Resolution 541. The effort for a national day of awareness was initiated by Senator Kent Conrad of North Dakota in honor of Staff Sgt. Joe Biel, a North Dakota National Guard member who died by suicide after returning from two tours in Iraq. June 27 was chosen as it was Biel's birthday. In 2013, the Senate designated the whole month of June as PTSD Awareness Month. The U.S. Department of Veterans Affairs also recognizes June 27 as PTSD Screening Day.

In the US, 6.8% of adults will experience PTSD in their lifetimes, with women twice as likely as men to experience it (10.4% to 5%) frequently as a result of sexual trauma. Veterans are another group highly likely to experience PTSD during their lives, with Vietnam War veterans at 30%, Gulf War veterans at 10%, and Iraq War veterans at 14%.

On this day, organizations that work with employees, consumers, and patients at risk for the condition work to get information about symptoms and treatments for it out to the public in the hopes that when more people know about the disease, more people who suffer from it will get treatment. The US Department of Defense is one of the major organizations involved.
