= Gregorios =

Gregorios or Gregorius may refer to:

== People ==
- Gregorios Abdal Jaleel (died 1681), bishop and saint of the Syriac Orthodox Church
- Gregorios Bernardakis (1848–1925), Greek philologist, palaeographer and professor
- Gregorios Yohanna Ibrahim (born 1948), Syriac Orthodox archbishop of Aleppo and kidnap victim
- Gregorios Joseph (born 1960), Syriac Orthodox bishop
- Gregorios Kuriakose (born 1954), Syriac Orthodox bishop
- Gregorius Nekschot, pseudonym of an anonymous and prosecuted Dutch cartoonist
- Gregorios Papamichael (1875–1956), theologian of the Orthodox Church of Greece
- Benedict Gregorios (1916–1994), second Metropolitan Archbishop of the Syro-Malankara Catholic Church
- Gabriel Mar Gregorios (born 1949), Metropolitan of the Diocese of Thiruvananthapuram of the Indian (Malankara) Orthodox Church
- Geevarghese Gregorios of Parumala (1848–1902), bishop and saint of the Malankara Syrian Church and saint of the Syriac Orthodox Church
- Paulos Gregorios (1922–1996), first Metropolitan of the Delhi diocese of the Malankara Orthodox Syrian Church

== Fictional characters ==
- Sergeant Gregorius, in Dan Simmons's novels Endymion and The Rise of Endymion
- Reverend Gregorius, the antagonist in Hjalmar Söderberg's novel Doctor Glas
