= Pope Vitalian =

Head of the Catholic Church from 657 to 672

Pope Saint Vitalian
- Bishop of Rome
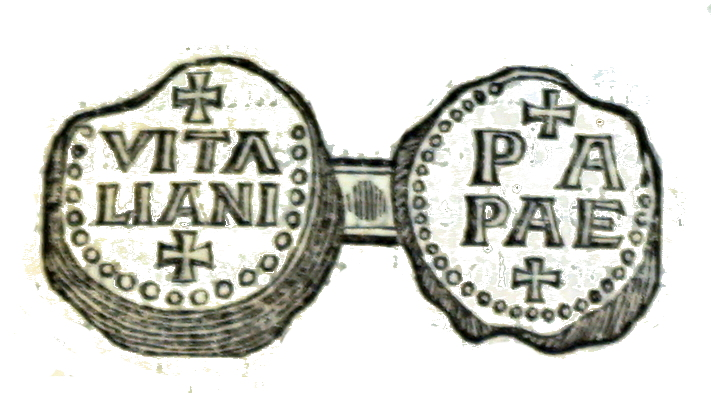
- Bulla seal of Pope Vitalian
- Church: Roman Catholic Church Eastern Orthodox Church
- Papacy began: 30 July 657
- Papacy ended: 27 January 672
- Predecessor: Eugene I
- Successor: Adeodatus II

Personal details
- Born: 21 September 600 Segni, Eastern Roman Empire
- Died: 27 January 672 (aged 71) Rome

Sainthood
- Feast day: 27 January
- Venerated in: Roman Catholic Church

Pope Vitalian (Latin: Vitalianus; died 27 January 672) was the bishop of Rome from 30 July 657 to his death in 672. His pontificate was marked by the dispute between the papacy and the imperial government in Constantinople over Monothelitism, which Rome condemned. Vitalian tried to resolve the dispute and had a conciliatory relationship with Emperor Constans II, who visited him in Rome and gave him gifts. Vitalian's pontificate also saw the secession of the Archbishopric of Ravenna from the papal authority.

== Election ==
Vitalian was born in Segni, Lazio, the son of Anastasius. After the death of Eugene I on 2 or 3 June 657, Vitalian was elected to succeed him. He was consecrated as pope on 30 July, keeping his baptismal name.

== Pontificate ==
=== Monothelitism ===
Like Eugene, Vitalian tried to restore the connection with Constantinople by making friendly advances to Emperor Constans II and to prepare the way for the settlement of the Monothelite controversy. He sent letters (synodica) announcing his elevation to the emperor and to Patriarch Peter of Constantinople, who was inclined to Monothelitism. The emperor confirmed the privileges of the Holy See as head of the Church in the West and sent to Rome a codex of the Gospels in a cover of gold richly ornamented with precious stones as a good-will gesture.

Patriarch Peter also replied, although his answer was somewhat noncommittal as to Monothelitism, a belief he defended. In his letter, he gave the impression of being in accord with the pope. Thus ecclesiastical intercourse between Rome and Constantinople was restored. Peter's letter to Vitalian was later read during the thirteenth session of the Sixth Ecumenical Council (681) and served as the basis for Peter's condemnation as a Monothelite. Vitalian's name was entered on the diptychs of the churches in Byzantium—the only name of a pope so entered between the pontificate of Honorius I (d. 638) and the Sixth Ecumenical Council of 680–81.

Vitalian, alongside Peter and Constans, also played a part in the condemnation and subsequent exile of Maximus the Confessor when they issued a joint order demanding everyone to be in communion with the Church of Constantinople.

Vitalian showed reciprocity toward Constans when the latter came to Rome in 663 to spend twelve days there during a campaign against the Lombards. On 5 July, the pope and members of the Roman clergy met the emperor at the sixth milestone and accompanied him to St. Peter's Basilica, where the emperor offered gifts. The following Sunday, Constans went in state to St. Peter's, offered a pallium wrought with gold, and was present during the Mass celebrated by the pope. The emperor dined with the pope on the following Saturday, attended Mass again on Sunday at St. Peter's, and after Mass took leave of the pope. On his departure Constans removed a large number of bronze artworks, including the bronze tiles from the roof of the Pantheon, which had been dedicated to Christian worship.

Constans then moved on to Sicily, oppressed the population, and was assassinated at Syracuse in 668. Vitalian supported Constans' son Constantine IV against the usurper Mezezius and thus helped him attain the throne. As Constantine had no desire to maintain the Monothelite decree of his father, Vitalian made use of this inclination to take a more decided stand against Monothelitism and to win the emperor over to orthodoxy. In this latter attempt, however, he did not succeed. The Monothelite Patriarch Theodore I of Constantinople removed Vitalian's name from the diptychs. It was not until the Sixth Ecumenical Council that Monothelitism was suppressed and Vitalian's name was replaced on the diptychs of the churches in Byzantium.

=== Western Church relations ===
Pope Vitalian was successful in improving relations with England, where the Anglo-Saxon and British clergies were divided regarding various ecclesiastical customs. At the Synod of Whitby, King Oswy of Northumbria accepted Roman practices regarding the keeping of Easter and the shape of the tonsure. Vitalian sent a highly educated monk, Theodore of Tarsus, who understood both Latin and Greek, to be archbishop of Canterbury.

The archiepiscopal See of Ravenna reported directly to Rome. Archbishop Maurus (644–71) sought to end this dependence and make his see autocephalous. When Pope Vitalian called upon him to justify his theological views, Maurus refused to obey and declared himself independent of Rome, initiating a schism. The pope excommunicated him, but Maurus did not submit and excommunicated Vitalian in return. Emperor Constans II sided with the archbishop and issued an edict removing the archbishop of Ravenna from the patriarchal jurisdiction of Rome. He ordained that the former should receive the pallium from the emperor. The successor of Maurus, Reparatus, was consecrated in 671. It was not until the pontificate of Leo II (682–83) that the independence of the See of Ravenna was suppressed.

=== Authority over Bishops in Crete ===
Vitalian played a role in exonerating a bishop of Crete. Bishop John of Lappa had been deposed by a synod under the presidency of Metropolitan Paul. During this time Lappa, located in modern day Crete, was under the jurisdiction of Rome and was later transferred to the patriarchate of Constantinople during the iconoclasm controversy. John appealed to the pope and was imprisoned by Paul for so doing. He escaped, however, and went to Rome, where Vitalian held a synod in December 667 to investigate the matter and pronounced John guiltless. He then wrote to Paul demanding the restoration of John to his diocese and the return of the monasteries which had been unjustly taken from him. At the same time the pope directed the metropolitan to remove two deacons who had each married after consecration.

== Death and legacy ==
Vitalian died on 27 January 672 and was succeeded by Adeodatus II. He is venerated as a saint in the Roman Catholic Church, with his feast day being celebrated each year on 23 July. The introduction of church organ music is traditionally believed to date from the time of Vitalian's papacy.

== Notes ==
Catholic Church titles
Preceded by Eugene I	Pope; 657–672	Succeeded by Adeodatus II
