= Pope Benedict II =

Head of the Catholic Church from 684 to 685

Pope Saint Benedict II
- Bishop of Rome
- Church: Catholic Church
- Papacy began: 26 June 684
- Papacy ended: 8 May 685
- Predecessor: Leo II
- Successor: John V

Personal details
- Born: Rome, Byzantine Empire
- Died: 8 May 685 Rome, Byzantine Empire

Sainthood
- Feast day: 7 May

Pope Benedict II (Latin: Benedictus II) was the bishop of Rome from 26 June 684 to his death on 8 May 685. Pope Benedict II's feast day is 7 May.

== Early life ==
Benedict was born in Rome. It is possible that he was a member of the Savelli family, though this is not certain. Sent when young to the schola cantorum, he distinguished himself by his knowledge of the Scriptures and by his singing.

== Papacy ==
The bishops of Rome were anciently chosen by the clergy and people of Rome, according to the discipline of those times; the Roman emperor was the head of the people, on which account his consent was required. But whilst the emperors resided in Constantinople, this condition produced often long delays and considerable inconveniences. He was chosen in 683. He was not ordained until 684 awaiting the permission of Emperor Constantine IV. According to the Liber Diurnus Romanorum Pontificum, he obtained from the emperor a decree which either abolished imperial confirmations altogether or made them obtainable from the exarch of Ravenna. Benedict symbolically adopted Constantine's sons, Justinian II and Heraclius.

To help to suppress Monothelitism, Benedict endeavoured to secure the subscriptions of the bishops of Hispania to the decrees of the Third Council of Constantinople of 680/1, and to bring about the submission to the decrees of Macarius, the deposed bishop of Antioch. Restorations of numerous churches in Rome are ascribed to the less than a year's pontificate of Benedict II, including Old St. Peter's Basilica and San Lorenzo in Lucina. After a pontificate of about eleven months, Pope Benedict II died on May 8, 685 and was buried in St. Peter's.

Catholic Church titles
Preceded by Leo II	Pope; 684–685	Succeeded by John V
