= Antipope Theodore =

Presbyter and priest, antipope c. 687

- Papacy began: 21 September 687
- Papacy ended: 15 December 687
- Predecessor: Roman claimant: Pope Conon; Antipapal claimant: Dioscorus
- Successor: Roman claimant: Sergius I Antipapal claimant: Constantine II
- Opposed to: Rival claimant: Paschal
- Other post: Archpriest

Personal details
- Occupation: Archpriest

Theodore was a rival with Paschal for the papacy following the death of Pope Conon (21 September 687), and thus is considered an antipope.

== Biography ==
Prior to the disputed election, Theodore was an archpriest. According to the Liber Pontificalis partisans of Theodore and Paschal seized different parts of the Lateran, and as each were unwilling to give way to the other they were locked in combat for control of the entire basilica. Meanwhile, representatives of the garrison, the majority of the clergy and the citizens met in the imperial palace and eventually elected Sergius, a priest of the church of Santa Susanna as Conon's successor. Having thus decided on Sergius, they brought him to the Lateran and forced their way in. Theodore immediately conceded the office, and abased himself to Sergius.

Paschal remained unconvinced, and while pretending to accept Sergius, sent messengers to the exarch of Ravenna John Platyn promising gold in exchange for military support. The exarch arrived, demanded the gold, and looted Old St. Peter's Basilica, but departed after Sergius I's consecration (15 December 687).

== See also ==
- Papal selection before 1059
