= Antipope Paschal (687) =

Archdeacon, antipope in 687

- Papacy began: 21 September 687
- Papacy ended: c. 15 December 687
- Predecessor: Pope Conon
- Successor: Sergius I (as Pope)
- Opposed to: Roman claimant: Sergius I Rival claimant: Theodore

Personal details
- Died: Rome, Italy

Paschal was a rival with Theodore for Pope following the death of Pope Conon (21 September 687), and thus is considered an antipope.

== Biography ==
Prior to the disputed election, Paschal was an archdeacon. According to the Liber Pontificalis partisans of Paschal and Theodore seized different parts of the Lateran, and as each were unwilling to give way to the other they were locked in combat for control of the entire basilica. Meanwhile, representatives of the garrison, the majority of the clergy and the citizens met in the imperial palace and eventually elected Sergius, a priest of the church of Santa Susanna as Conon's successor. Having thus decided on Sergius, they brought him to the Lateran and forced their way in.

Although appearing to accede to the supporters of Pope Sergius, Paschal sent messengers to the exarch of Ravenna John Platyn promising gold in exchange for military support. The exarch arrived, demanded the gold, and looted Old St. Peter's Basilica, but departed after Sergius I's consecration (15 December 687). Paschal was eventually confined to a monastery on charges of witchcraft.

== See also ==
- Papal selection before 1059
