= Louise-Thérèse de Montaignac de Chauvance =

Blessed Louise-Thérèse de Montaignac de Chauvance
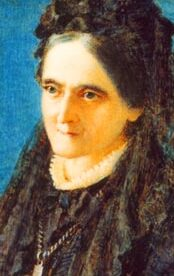

Virgin
- Born: 14 May 1820; Le Havre-de-Grâce, Seine-Maritime, Kingdom of France
- Died: 27 June 1885 (aged 65); Moulins, Allier, French Third Republic
- Venerated in: Roman Catholic Church
- Beatified: 4 November 1990, Saint Peter's Square, Vatican City by Pope John Paul II
- Feast: 27 June

Louise-Thérèse de Montaignac de Chauvance (14 May 1820 - 27 June 1885) was a French Roman Catholic who founded the pious union of the Oblates of the Sacred Heart (fr. Oblates du Coeur de Jésus) in 1874. She was known for her staunch devotion to the Sacred Heart of Jesus and the members of the union ought to renew the society "by their example and their holy lives". De Montaignac de Chauvance's life witnessed her catering to catechetical formation and promoting the Sacred Heart in France. She was beatified on 4 November 1990.

== Life ==
Louise-Thérèse de Montaignac de Chauvance was born in France in 1820 as the fifth of six children to Raimondo Amato and Anna de Raffin; her father worked as a civil servant. Her lineage also tied to noble families of France linked to the former kingdom. She made her First Communion on 6 June 1833.

Her education commenced at the age of seven. She studied at the Faithful Companions of Jesus College and later from 1837 at the Paris des Oiseaux that the Augustinians ran. It was in her late childhood that she began to read the Gospel and the spiritual writings of Teresa of Ávila. Bone disease first struck her in 1842 and would continue to plague her for the remainder of her life; such disease often left her bedridden. She made a private vow to the Sacred Heart of Jesus Christ on 8 September 1843. Chauvance founded the Society of Tabernacles in 1848 with an emphasis on the Eucharist and in 1854 founded the Opera Adoration of Reparation. It was around that time in 1848 that she - with her siblings and parents - moved to Montluçon and moved in with her maternal aunt de Raffin. In 1844 she and her aunt began the process of establishing a new community devoted to the Sacred Heart, but the project stalled with de Raffin's death on 4 December 1845.

Chauvance sought the counsel of her spiritual director, Father Gaume, and decided not to join the Carmelites as she intended, but rather to continue the work she and her aunt began. She returned to her hometown in February 1848 when she began to gather women for her new community. It was in 1848 that she founded a catechetical center and an orphanage for children. Her sister died which led to Chauvance - in July 1863 - taking care of the education of her three children. In March 1874 she founded the Oblates of the Heart of Jesus though its formal activities started on 21 December 1874 with its former and initial name of the Pious Society of the Oblates of the Heart of Jesus.

In December 1875 she was appointed as the Secretary General of the "Apostolate of Prayer" that the Jesuit priest Ramier led. She was later made superior of her congregation on 17 May 1880 while Pope Leo XIII granted papal approval to the order on 4 October 1881. The order had previously received diocesan support and approval from the Bishop Pierre Simon de Dreux-Brézé.

Chauvance died on 27 June 1885.

== Beatification ==
Chauvance's spiritual writings were approved by theologians on 11 June 1913. The formal introduction to the cause came on 23 December 1914 under Pope Benedict XV, granting Chauvance the title of Servant of God. The previous processes were made valid on 26 June 1923 at the discretion of the Congregation of Rites while the Positio was submitted decades later to the Congregation for the Causes of Saints in Rome in 1980. Theologians voiced approval to the cause on 30 June 1987 while the Congregation of the Saints approved it on 1 March 1998. On 28 March 1988 Louise-Thérèse de Montaignac de Chauvance was declared Venerable after Pope John Paul II approved her heroic virtue.

A miracle in France was validated on 26 June 1923 and received papal approval on 3 March 1990, which allowed for John Paul II to preside over her beatification on the following 4 November.
