= Pope Donus =

Head of the Catholic Church from 676 to 678

- Bishop of Rome
- Church: Catholic Church
- Papacy began: 2 November 676
- Papacy ended: 11 April 678
- Predecessor: Adeodatus II
- Successor: Agatho

Personal details
- Born: Rome, Byzantine Empire
- Died: 11 April 678 Rome, Byzantine Empire

Pope Donus (died on 11 April 678), known as Pope Donus I until 1947, was the bishop of Rome from 676 to his death on 11 April 678. Few details survive about him or his achievements beyond what is recorded in the Liber Pontificalis.

== Election ==
Donus was the son of a Roman named Maurice. He became pope on 2 November 676, having been selected to succeed Adeodatus II. By that time, Donus was already elderly.

== Pontificate ==
Donus expanded the clergy of Rome with twelve new priests and five deacons. He also consecrated six bishops for various sees. One of these may have been Vitalianus of Arezzo. He had the atrium of Old St. Peter's Basilica paved with large blocks of white marble, and restored other churches of Rome, notably the church of St. Euphemia on the Appian Way and the Basilica of St. Paul Outside the Walls. Donus was shocked to discover a colony of Nestorian monks in Boetianum, a Syrian monastery in Rome. He gave their monastery to Roman monks and dispersed them through the various religious houses of the city in the hope that they would accept Chalcedonian Christianity. The Nestorians were possibly refugees fleeing the Muslim conquest of the Levant.

During the pontificate of Donus, Archbishop Reparatus of Ravenna returned to the obedience of the Holy See, thus ending the schism created by Archbishop Maurus, who had aimed at making Ravenna autocephalous. Donus' relations with Constantinople tended towards the conciliatory. On 10 August 678, Emperor Constantine IV addressed him as "the most holy and blessed archbishop of our ancient Rome and the universal pope," hoping to attract him to engage in negotiations with the patriarch of Constantinople and the Monothelites. He ordered that Pope Vitalianus' name be put back in the diptychs of those bishops in communion with Constantinople, an act which caused him a great deal of trouble from the Monothelites and Patriarch Theodore I of Constantinople.

Donus died on 11 April 678 and was buried the same day in Old St. Peter's Basilica. He was succeeded by Agatho.

== Sources ==
- Baronius, Caesar (1867). Augustinus Theiner (ed.). Annales ecclesiastici: A. D. 1-1571 denuo excusi et ad nostra usque tempora perducti ab Augustino Theiner (in Latin). Vol. Tomus undecimus (600-679). Bar-Le-Duc: Typis et sumptibus Ludovici Guerin. pp. 592–604.
- Doglu, Paolo. "Il papato tra l'impero bizantino e l'Occidente nel VII e VIII secolo," in: Gabriele De Rosa and Giorgio Cracco, ed. (2001). Il papato e l'Europa. Soveria Mannelli (Catanzaro): Rubbettino Editore. pp. 55–79, at pp. 61–64. ISBN 978-88-498-0222-1.
- Duchesne, Louis (ed.) (1886). Le Liber pontificalis; texte, introduction et commentaire par L. Duchesne Tome premier. Paris: E. Thorin. pp. 348–349.
- Mann, Horace Kinder (1903). The Lives of the Popes in the Early Middle Ages. Volume I, Part II. London: Kegan Paul. pp. 20–22.

Catholic Church titles
Preceded by Adeodatus II	Pope; 676–678	Succeeded by Agatho
