= Pope Adeodatus II =

Head of the Catholic Church from 672 to 676

- Bishop of Rome
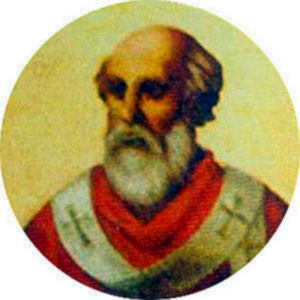
- Portrait of Adeodatus II
- Church: Catholic Church
- Papacy began: 11 April 672
- Papacy ended: 17 June 676
- Predecessor: Vitalian
- Successor: Donus

Personal details
- Born: c. 621 Rome, Byzantine Empire
- Died: 17 June 676 (aged 54–55) Rome, Byzantine Empire

Pope Adeodatus II (c. 621–17 June 676), sometimes called Deodatus, was the bishop of Rome from 672 to his death on 17 June 676. He devoted much of his papacy to improving churches and fighting monothelitism.

== Rise ==
Born in Rome in 621 A.D., Adeodatus was the son of a man named Jovinianus. He became a Benedictine monk of the monastery of Sant'Erasmo al Celio in Rome. He became Pope on 11 April 672 in succession to Vitalian. His election was ratified by the exarch of Ravenna within weeks, as required during the period of Byzantine papacy.

== Pontificate ==
Adeodatus II's pontificate is extremely obscure. It coincided with a surge of passionate interest in Pope Martin I and Maximus the Confessor, who were known for resisting the support of the Eastern Roman emperors for Monothelism. In light of this, Pope Adeodatus rejected the synodical letters sent to him by Patriarch Constantine I of Constantinople. Because of this, his name was excluded from the diptychs in Constantinople. Adeodatus was active in improving monastic discipline and in the repression of Monothelitism and gave Venice the right to choose its doge. During his pontificate, the Basilica of St. Peter was built at the eighth milestone of the Via Portuensis. St. Erasmus was also reconstructed. Elected as Pope on 11 April 672, Adeodatus II did not get involved in political events and disengaged himself from the events at the time surrounding Monothelitism.

Pope Adeodatus II devoted his reign to the restoration of churches in disrepair. He protected the Abbey of St. Peter and St. Paul (known as St. Augustine's Abbey), exempted Marmoutier Abbey, Tours (Abbey of St. Martin of Tours) from the authority of the Holy See, and led improvements to St. Erasmus' monastery. He is sometimes called a saint and 26 June is given as his feast day, but this is disputed and he appears not to have been included in the latest official edition of the Roman Martyrology. Adeodatus II's papacy does not seem to have made any outstanding contribution to civil society. He died on 17 June 676 and was succeeded by Donus.

== Notes ==
Catholic Church titles
Preceded by Vitalian	Pope; 672–676	Succeeded by Donus
