= Pope Conon =

Head of the Catholic Church from 686 to 687

- Bishop of Rome
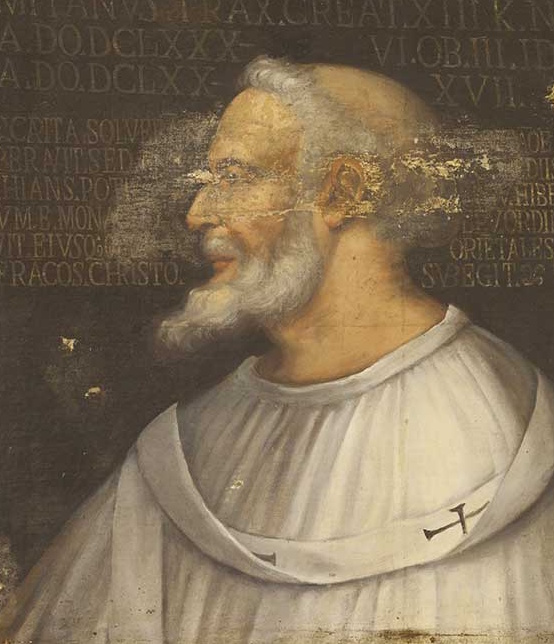
- Fresco at the Palazzo Altieri, c. 1661
- Church: Catholic Church
- Papacy began: 21 October 686
- Papacy ended: 21 September 687
- Predecessor: John V
- Successor: Sergius I
- Previous post: Cardinal-Deacon (683–86)

Orders
- Created cardinal: 1 May 683 by Leo II

Personal details
- Born: 630 Thracesian Theme or Sicily, Byzantine Empire
- Died: 21 September 687 (aged 56–57) Rome, Byzantine Empire

Pope Conon (Greek: Κόνων, romanized: Konōn; died 21 September 687) was the bishop of Rome from 21 October 686 to his death on 21 September 687. He had been put forward as a compromise candidate, there being a conflict between the two factions resident in Rome — the military and the clerical. He consecrated the Irish missionary St Kilian and commissioned him to preach in Franconia.

== Background ==
According to the Liber pontificalis, Conon was a Greek, the son of an officer from the Thracesian Theme. He was educated in Sicily, where his father may have been posted during the stay of Constans II, and was later ordained a priest at Rome. He may have been among the many Sicilian clergy in Rome, at that time, due to Muslim raids on Sicily in the mid-7th century.

== Papacy ==
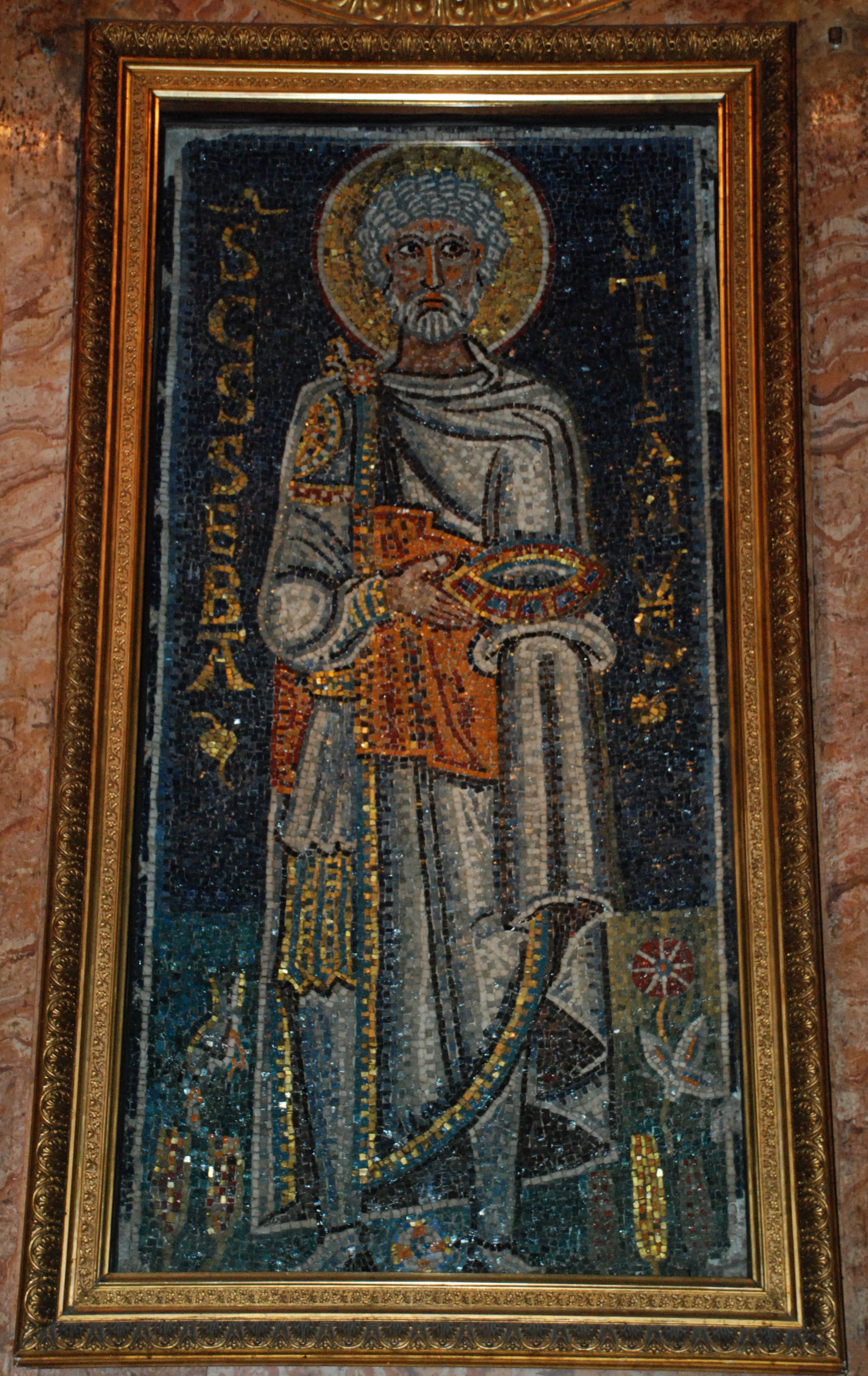
Mosaic of Saint Sebastian, added to San Pietro in Vincoli c. AD 680, so roughly contemporaneous with Conon's time in Rome.

Conon's age, venerable appearance, and simple character caused the clergy and soldiery of Rome, who were in disagreement, to put aside their respective candidates and to elect him as pope. Andrew J. Ekonomou says that due to an "increasing influx" of Easterners into Rome at that time, that the Syrian, Greek, and Greco-Sicilian population together outnumbered the Latins. This would also have increased Conon's electability. Conon was consecrated on 21 October 686 after notice of his election had been sent to the exarch of Ravenna, or after it had been confirmed by him.

Conon received the Irish missionaries Kilian and his companions, consecrated Kilian bishop, and commissioned him and the others to preach the faith in Franconia. (Vita S. Kiliani, in Canisius, Lect. Antiquæ, III, 175–180.) He was in favour with Emperor Justinian II, who informed him that he had recovered the Acts of the Third Council of Constantinople, by which, the emperor wrote, it was his intention to abide. Justinian also remitted certain taxes and dues owing to the imperial exchequer from several papal patrimonies.

Conon was buried in the Patriarchal Basilica of St. Peter.

Catholic Church titles
Preceded by John V	Pope; 686–687	Succeeded by Sergius I
