= Pope Agatho =

Head of the Catholic Church from 678 to 681

Pope Saint Agatho
- Bishop of Rome
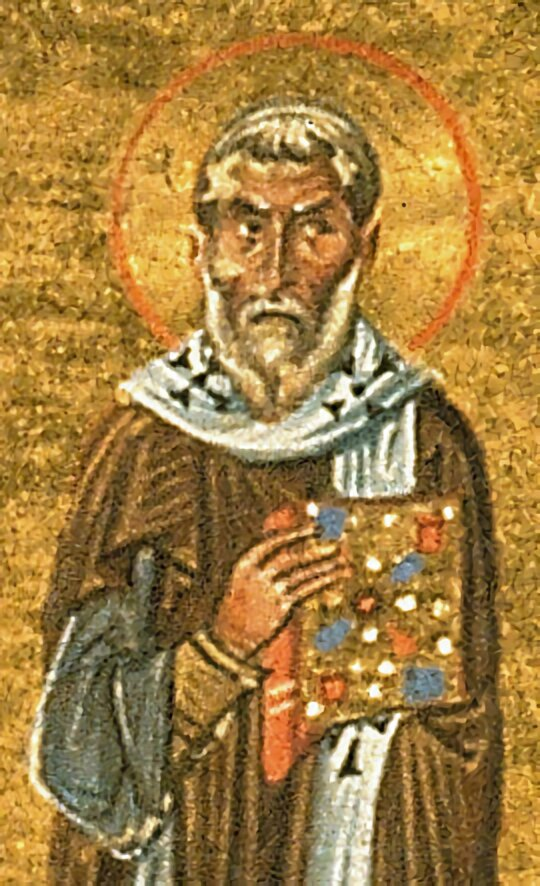
- Pope Agatho depicted in the Menologion of Basil II (c. 1000 AD)
- Church: Church of Rome
- Papacy began: 27 June 678
- Papacy ended: 10 January 681
- Predecessor: Donus
- Successor: Leo II
- Previous post: Cardinal-Deacon (676–77)

Orders
- Created cardinal: 5 March 676 by Adeodatus II

Personal details
- Born: c. 577 Possibly Palermo, Sicily, Eastern Roman Empire
- Died: 10 January 681 (aged 103–104) Rome, Italy, Eastern Roman Empire

Sainthood
- Feast day: 10 January (Catholic Church; 20 February (Eastern Christianity - Additional commemoration)
- Venerated in: Catholic Church; Eastern Orthodox Church
- Attributes: Holding a long cross
- Patronage: Palermo

Pope Agatho (c. 577 – 10 January 681) served as the bishop of Rome from 27 June 678 until his death on 10 January 681. He heard the appeal of Wilfrid of York, who had been displaced from his see by the division of the archdiocese ordered by Theodore of Canterbury. During Agatho's tenure, the Sixth Ecumenical Council was convened to deal with monothelitism. He is venerated as a saint by both the Catholic and Eastern Orthodox churches. He is said to have been the longest lived pope ever.

== Early life ==
The details of Agatho's early life are uncertain. It has been written that he was born around 577 in Palermo, Sicily, and was of Greek origin, whose parents died when he was young. After the death of his parents, it is said that he joined the monastery of San Giovanni degli Eremiti in Palermo. Due to the Rashidun Caliphate's raids on Sicily that began in 652, many Sicilian clergy had fled to Rome, and Agatho may have been among them.

He served several years as treasurer of the church of Rome. He succeeded Pope Donus, and ascended to the papacy on 27 June 678, a Sunday.

== Papacy ==
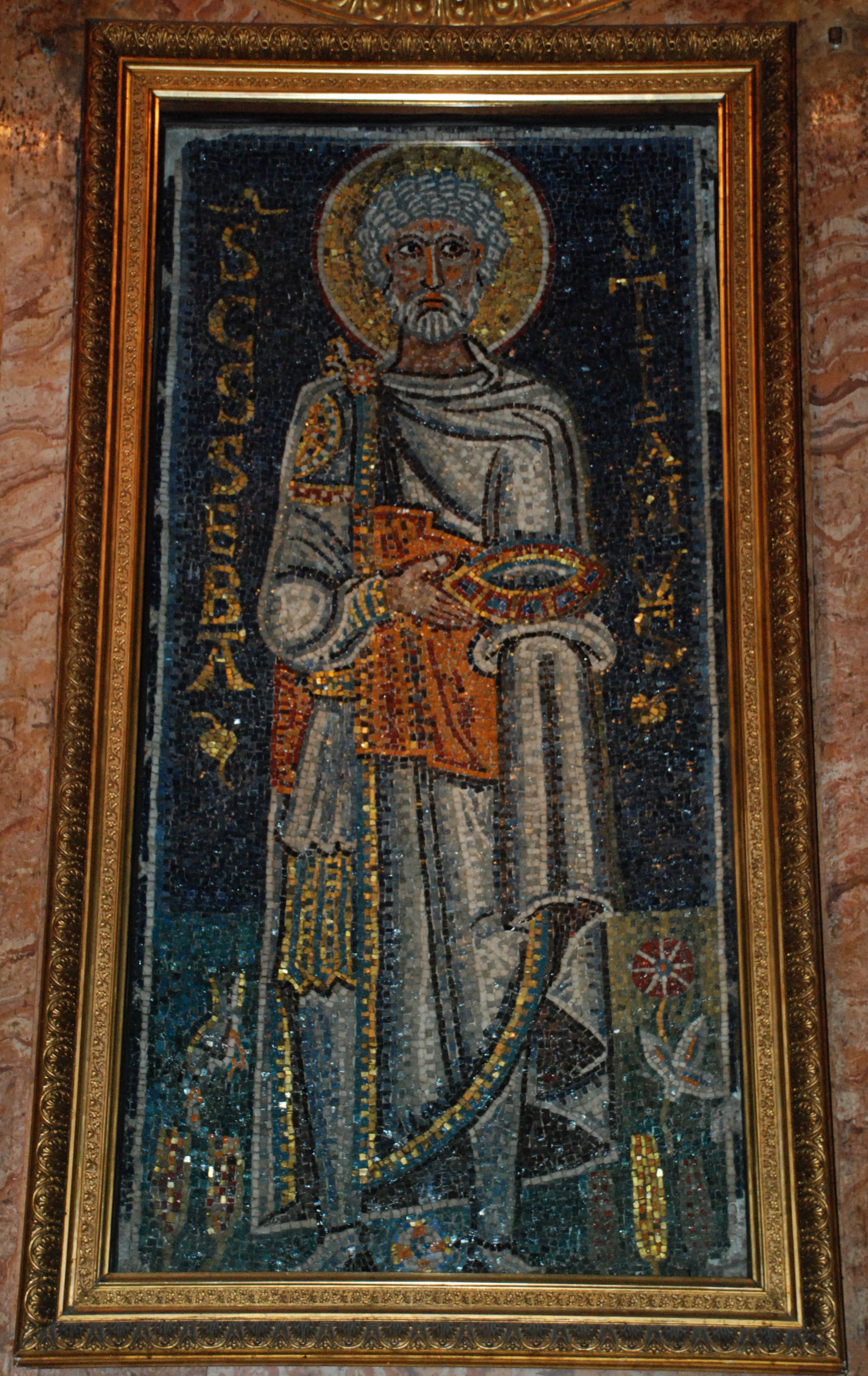
Mosaic of Saint Sebastian, added to San Pietro in Vincoli c. AD 680, and therefore contemporaneous with Agatho's reign

Shortly after Agatho became pope, Bishop Wilfrid of York arrived in Rome to invoke the authority of the Holy See on his behalf. Wilfrid had been deposed from his see by Archbishop Theodore of Canterbury, who had carved up Wilfrid's diocese and appointed three bishops to govern the new sees. At a synod which Pope Agatho convoked in the Lateran to investigate the affair, it was decided that Wilfrid's diocese should indeed be divided, but that Wilfrid himself should name the bishops.

The major event of Agatho's pontificate was the Sixth Ecumenical Council (680–681), following the end of the Muslim Siege of Constantinople, which suppressed Monothelitism, which had been tolerated by previous popes (Honorius I among them). The council began when Emperor Constantine IV, wanting to heal the schism that separated the two sides, wrote to Pope Donus suggesting a conference on the matter, but Donus was dead by the time the letter arrived. Agatho was quick to seize the olive branch offered by the Emperor. He ordered councils held throughout the West so that legates could present the common position of the Western Church. Then he sent a large delegation to meet the Easterners at Constantinople.

The legates and patriarchs gathered in the imperial palace on 7 November 680. The Monothelites presented their case. Then a letter of Pope Agatho was read that advocated the position that Christ was of two wills, divine and human. Patriarch George of Constantinople accepted the stance of Agatho's letter, as did most of the bishops present. The council proclaimed the existence of the two wills in Christ and condemned Monothelitism, with Pope Honorius I being included in the condemnation. When the council ended in September 681 the decrees were sent to the Pope, but Agatho had died in January. The council had not only ended Monothelism, but also had healed the schism.

Agatho also undertook negotiations between the Holy See and Constantine IV concerning the interference of the Byzantine court in papal elections. Constantine promised Agatho to abolish or reduce the tax that the popes had to pay to the imperial treasury on their consecration.

=== Age ===
Church records state that Agatho served as pope as a centenarian, dying between the ages of 103–104. Recent research has cast doubt on his age, with some claiming that Pope Agatho and a monk called Agathon have been confused, and are two different people.

== Veneration ==
Anastatius says that the number of his miracles procured him the title of Thaumaturgus. He died in 681, having held the pontificate about two and a half years. He is venerated as a saint by both Catholics and Eastern Orthodox. His feast day in Western Christianity is on 10 January. Eastern Christians, including Eastern Orthodox and the Eastern Catholic Churches, commemorate him on 20 February.

Catholic Church titles
| Preceded by Donus | Pope; 678–681 | Succeeded by Leo II |
