= Pope Leo II =

Head of the Catholic Church from 682 to 683

Pope Saint Leo II
- Bishop of Rome
- Church: Catholic Church
- Papacy began: 16 April 682
- Papacy ended: 28 June 683
- Predecessor: Agatho
- Successor: Benedict II

Orders
- Created cardinal: 5 December 680 by Agatho

Personal details
- Born: 1 January 611 Sicily, Byzantine Empire
- Died: 28 June 683 (aged 72) Rome, Byzantine Empire
- Parents: Paul

Sainthood
- Feast day: 28 June (3 July, pre-1970 calendar)

Pope Leo II (c. 01 January 611 – 28 June 683) was the Bishop of Rome from 17 August 682 to his death on 28 June 683. One of the popes of the Byzantine Papacy, he is described by a contemporary biographer as both just and learned. He is commemorated as a saint in the Roman Martyrology.

== Early career ==
Leo was a Sicilian by birth, the son of a man named Paul. He may have ended up being among the many Sicilian clergymen in Rome due to the attacks of the Caliphate on Sicily in the mid-7th century. Leo was known as an eloquent preacher who was interested in music, and noted for his charity to the poor.

== Papacy ==
Pope Agatho died on 10 January 681, and Leo was elected on 16 April. He was not consecrated until 17 August 682. The reason may have been due to Agatho's negotiations with Emperor Constantine IV regarding imperial control of papal elections. Constantine IV had already promised Agatho to abolish or reduce the tax that the Popes had been paying to the imperial treasury at the time of their consecration, an imperial policy that had been in force for about a century.

Leo's short-lived pontificate did not allow him to accomplish much. Notably, he confirmed the acts of the Sixth Ecumenical Council (680–681) against Monothelitism. After Leo had notified the emperor that the decrees of the council had been confirmed, he made them known to the people of the West. In letters written to the Visigothic king, bishops, and nobles, he explained what the council had effected, and he called upon the bishops to subscribe to its decrees. During this council, Pope Honorius I was anathematized for tolerating Monothelism. Leo took great pains to make it clear that in condemning Honorius, he did so not because Honorius taught heresy, but because he was not active enough in opposing it. In accordance with the papal mandate, a synod was held at Toledo (684) in which the Third Council of Constantinople was accepted.

Leo put an end to the attempts of Archbishops of Ravenna to break from the control of the Bishop of Rome, but also abolished the tax it had been customary for them to pay when they received the pallium. In apparent response to Lombard raids, Leo transferred the relics of some martyrs from the catacombs to churches inside the city walls. He dedicated two churches, St. Paul's and Sts. Sebastian and George. Leo also reformed Gregorian Chant and composed several sacred hymns for the Divine Office.

== Death ==
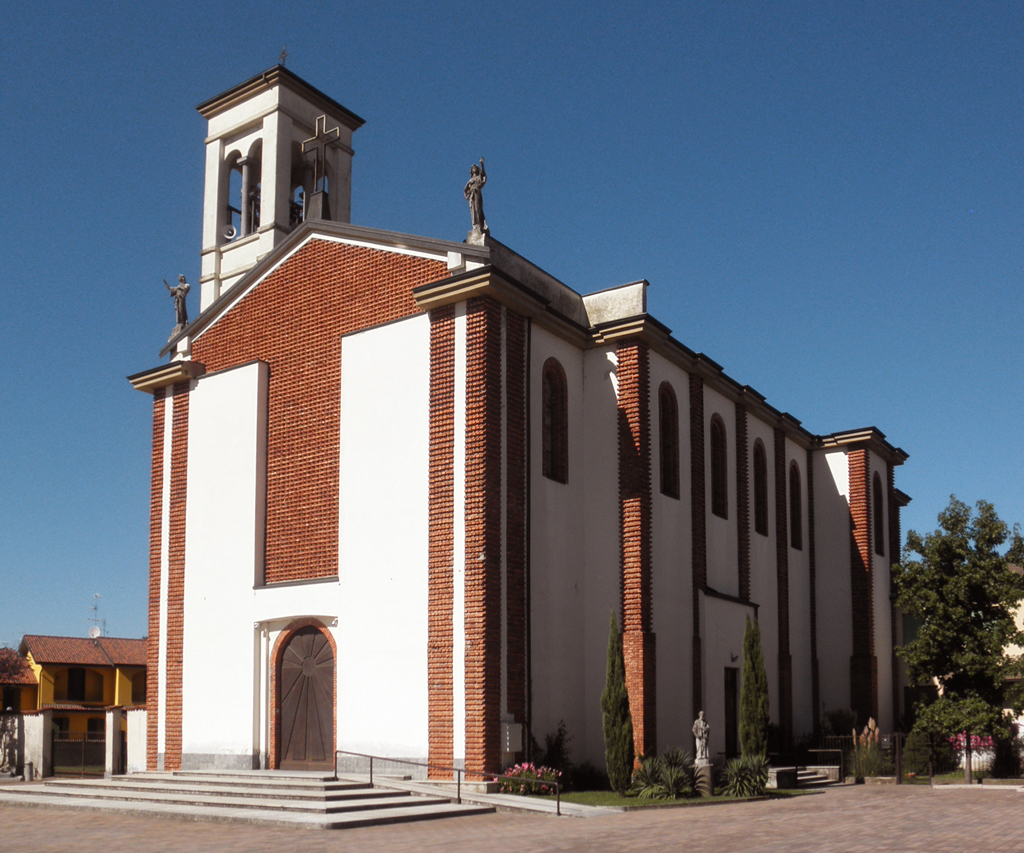
Church dedicated to Pope St Leo II in Villanova del Sillaro, Lombardy.

Leo died on 28 June 683, and was succeeded by Benedict II. He was originally buried in his own monument; however, some years after his death, his remains were put into a tomb that contained the first four of his papal namesakes.

Catholic Church titles
| Preceded by Agatho | Pope; 682–683 | Succeeded by Benedict II |
