= List of leaders during the Byzantine Papacy =

The Byzantine emperor, Pope of Rome, and Patriarch of Constantinople often came into conflict during the Byzantine Papacy (537–752). Rival claimants to either See or the throne often buttressed their authority by the endorsement of or attempted to depose other incumbents.

Period	Pope	Emperor	Patriarch
537–552	Vigilius (537–555)	Justinian I (527–565)	Menas (536–552)
552–555	Vigilius (537–555)	Justinian I (527–565)	Eutychius (552–565)
555–561	Pegalius I (556–561)	Justinian I (527–565)	Eutychius (552–565)
561–565	John III (561–574)	Justinian I (527–565)	Eutychius (552–565)
565–574	John III (561–574)	Justin II (565–578)	John Scholasticus (565–577)
574–577	Benedict I (575–579)	Justin II (565–578)	John Scholasticus (565–577)
577–578	Benedict I (575–579)	Justin II (565–578)	Eutychius (577–582), restored
578–579	Benedict I (575–579)	Tiberius II Constantine (578–582)	Eutychius (577–582), restored
579–582	Pelagius II (579–590)	Tiberius II Constantine (578–582)	Eutychius (577–582), restored
582–590	Pelagius II (579–590)	Maurice (582–602)	John IV Nesteutes (582–595)
590–596	Gregory I (590–604)	Maurice (582–602)	John IV Nesteutes (582–595)
596–602	Gregory I (590–604)	Maurice (582–602)	Cyriacus II (596–606)
602–604	Gregory I (590–604)	Phocas (602–610)	Cyriacus II (596–606)
604–607	Sabinian (604–606)	Phocas (602–610)	Cyriacus II (596–606)
607–608	Boniface III (607)	Phocas (602–610)	Thomas I (607–610)
608–610	Boniface IV (608–615)	Phocas (602–610)	Thomas I (607–610)
610–615	Boniface IV (608–615)	Heraclius (610–641)	Sergius I (610–638)
615–619	Adeodatus I (615–618)	Heraclius (610–641)	Sergius I (610–638)
619–625	Boniface V (619–625)	Heraclius (610–641)	Sergius I (610–638)
625–638	Honorius I (625–638)	Heraclius (610–641)	Sergius I (610–638)
638–640	Interregnum	Heraclius (610–641)	Pyrrhus I (638–641)
640	Severinus (640)	Heraclius (610–641)	Pyrrhus I (638–641)
640–641	John IV (640–642)	Heraclius (610–641)	Pyrrhus I (638–641)
641	John IV (640–642)	Constantine III (Feb.-May 641); Heraklonas (Feb.-Sept. 641) co-ruler Constans II (641)	Pyrrhus I (638–641)
641–642	John IV (640–642)	Constans II, as sole ruler (641–668)	Paul II (641–653)
642–649	Theodore I (642–649)	Constans II, as sole ruler (641–668)	Paul II (641–653)
649–654	Martin I (649–653)	Constans II, as sole ruler (641–668)	Paul II (641–653)
654–657	Eugene I (654–657)	Constans II, as sole ruler (641–668)	Peter (654–666)
657–667	Vitalian (657–672)	Constans II, as sole ruler (641–668)	Peter (654–666)
667–668	Vitalian (657–672)	Constans II, as sole ruler (641–668)	Thomas II (667–669)
668–669	Vitalian (657–672)	Constantine IV (668–685); Mezezius, usurper (668) co-ruler Justinian II (681–685)	Thomas II (667–669)
669–672	Vitalian (657–672)	Constantine IV (668–685); Mezezius, usurper (668) co-ruler Justinian II (681–685)	John V (669–675)
672–675	Adeodatus II (672–676)	Constantine IV (668–685); Mezezius, usurper (668) co-ruler Justinian II (681–685)	John V (669–675)
675–676	Adeodatus II (672–676)	Constantine IV (668–685); Mezezius, usurper (668) co-ruler Justinian II (681–685)	Constantine I (675–677)
676–677	Donus (676–678)	Constantine IV (668–685); Mezezius, usurper (668) co-ruler Justinian II (681–685)	Constantine I (675–677)
677–678	Donus (676–678)	Constantine IV (668–685); Mezezius, usurper (668) co-ruler Justinian II (681–685)	Theodore I (677–679)
678–679	Agatho (678–681)	Constantine IV (668–685); Mezezius, usurper (668) co-ruler Justinian II (681–685)	Theodore I (677–679)
679–682	Agatho (678–681)	Constantine IV (668–685); Mezezius, usurper (668) co-ruler Justinian II (681–685)	George I (679–686)
682–684	Leo II (682–683)	Constantine IV (668–685); Mezezius, usurper (668) co-ruler Justinian II (681–685)	George I (679–686)
684–685	Benedict II (684–685)	Constantine IV (668–685); Mezezius, usurper (668) co-ruler Justinian II (681–685)	George I (679–686)
685–686	John V (685–686)	Justinian II, as sole ruler (685–695)	George I (679–686)
686–687	Conon (686–687)	Justinian II, as sole ruler (685–695)	Interregnum
687–693	Sergius I (687–701); Theodore (687); Paschal (687)	Justinian II, as sole ruler (685–695)	Paul III (687–693)
693–695	Sergius I (687–701); Theodore (687); Paschal (687)	Justinian II, as sole ruler (685–695)	Callinicus I (693–705)
695–698	Sergius I (687–701); Theodore (687); Paschal (687)	Leontios (695–698)	Callinicus I (693–705)
698–701	Sergius I (687–701); Theodore (687); Paschal (687)	Tiberios III (698–705)	Callinicus I (693–705)
701–705	John VI (701–705)	Tiberios III (698–705)	Callinicus I (693–705)
705–708	John VII (705–707)	Justinian II, restored (705–711)	Cyrus (705–711)
708	Sisinnius (708)	Justinian II, restored (705–711)	Cyrus (705–711)
708–711	Constantine (708–715)	Justinian II, restored (705–711)	Cyrus (705–711)
711–712	Constantine (708–715)	Philippikos (711–713)	Interregnum
712–713	Constantine (708–715)	Philippikos (711–713)	John VI (712–715)
713–715	Constantine (708–715)	Anastasios II (713–715)	John VI (712–715)
715–717	Gregory II (715–731)	Theodosios III (715–717)	Germanus I (715–730)
717–730	Gregory II (715–731)	Leo III the Isaurian (717–741) co-ruler Constantine V (720–741)	Germanus I (715–730)
730–731	Gregory II (715–731)	Leo III the Isaurian (717–741) co-ruler Constantine V (720–741)	Anastasius (730–754)
731–741	Gregory III (731–741)	Leo III the Isaurian (717–741) co-ruler Constantine V (720–741)	Anastasius (730–754)
741–752	Zachary (741–752)	Constantine V, as sole ruler (741–775)	Anastasius (730–754)
