= List of 7th-century religious leaders =

This is a list of the top-level leaders for religious groups with at least 50,000 adherents, and that led anytime from January 1, 601, to December 31, 700. It should likewise only name leaders listed on other articles and lists.

== Christianity ==
- Church of Rome (complete list) –

- Gregory I, Pope (590–604)
- Sabinian, Pope (604–606)
- Boniface III, Pope (607)
- Boniface IV, Pope (608–615)
- Adeodatus I, Pope (615–618)
- Boniface V, Pope (619–625)
- Honorius I, Pope (625–638)
- Severinus, Pope (640)
- John IV, Pope (640–642)
- Theodore I, Pope (642–649)
- Martin I, Pope (649–655)
- Eugene I, Pope (654–657)
- Vitalian, Pope (657–672)
- Adeodatus II, Pope (672–676)
- Donus, Pope (676–678)
- Agatho, Pope (678–681)
- Leo II, Pope (682–683)
- Benedict II, Pope (684–685)
- John V, Pope (685–686)
- Conon, Pope (686–687)
- Sergius I, Pope (687–701)

- Church of Constantinople (complete list) –

- Cyriacus, Patriarch (596–606)
- St. Thomas I, Patriarch (607–610)
- Sergius I, Patriarch (610–638)
- Pyrrhus I, Patriarch (638–641, 654)
- Paul II, Patriarch (641–653)
- Pyrrhus I, Patriarch (638–641, 654)
- Peter, Patriarch (654–666)
- Thomas II, Patriarch (667–669)
- John V, Patriarch (669–675)
- Constantine I, Patriarch (675–677)
- Theodore I, Patriarch (677–679)
- George I, Patriarch (679–686)
- Paul III, Patriarch (687–693)
- Callinicus I, Patriarch (693–705)

== Islam ==
- Islam: Founder and Prophet

- Muhammad, Prophet (610–632)

- Islam: Successors to the Prophet

Rashidun Caliphate
- Abu Bakr, 1st Caliph (632–634, Sunni view)
- Umar, 2nd Caliph (634–644, Sunni view)
- Uthman, 3rd Caliph (644–656, Sunni view)
- Ali, 4th Caliph (656–661, Sunni view), 1st Imam (632–661, Shia view)
- Hasan (661 CE)

=== Sunni ===
- Sunni Islam (complete list) –

Umayyad Caliphate
- Muawiyah I, Caliph (661–680)
- Yazid I, Caliph (680–683)
- Muawiyah II, Caliph (683–684)
- Marwan I, Caliph (684–685)
- Abd al-Malik, Caliph (685–705)

=== Shia ===
- Shia Islam (complete list) –

- Ali, Imam ,(632-661)
- Hasan ibn Ali, Imam (661–670)
- Husayn ibn Ali, Imam (670–680)
- Ali ibn Husayn Zayn al-Abidin, Imam (680–712)

- Zaidiyyah (complete list)

- Al-Hasan al-Muthanna, Imam (680–706)

== Judaism ==
=== Rabbinic Judaism ===
- Exilarch (complete list) –

- Bostanai, Exilarch (c.640–?)

- Pumbedita Academy (complete list) –

- Hanan of Iskiya, Gaon (589–608)
- Mari ben R. Dimi, Gaon (609–c.628)
- Rav Hana, Gaon (c.630)
- Rav Ravah, Gaon (c.651)
- Rav Bosai, Gaon (c.660)
- Huna Mari ben Mar R. Joseph, Gaon (c.689)
- Hiyya of Meshan, Gaon (c.700)

- Sura Academy (complete list) –

- Mar ben Huna, Gaon (591/609–614/620)

- Palaestina Prima

- Nehemiah ben Hushiel, leader (614–617/625)

== See also ==
- Religious leaders by year
- List of state leaders in the 7th century
- Lists of colonial governors by century
