= Placidia Palace =

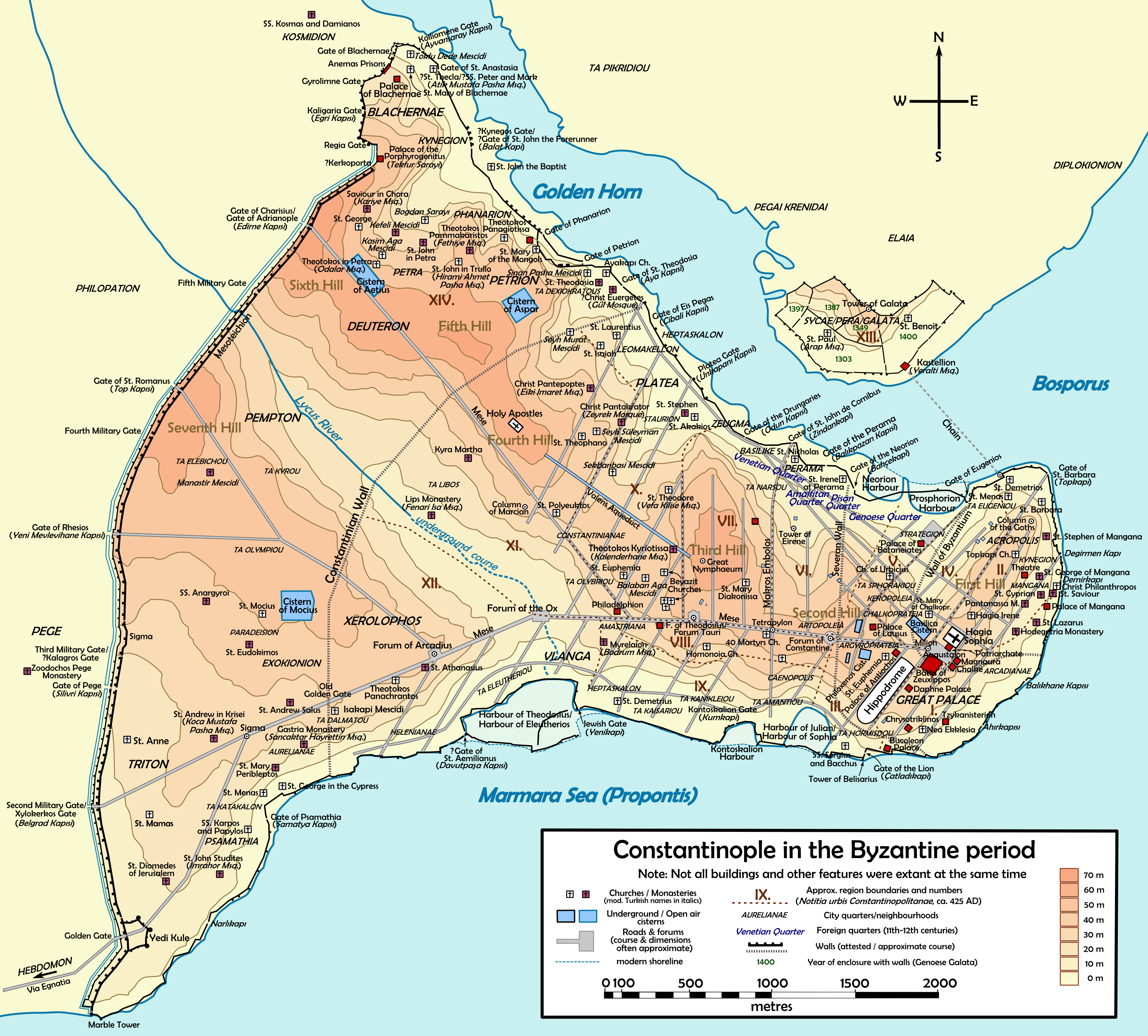
Map of Byzantine Constantinople

The Placidia Palace was the official residence of the papal apocrisiarius, the ambassador from the pope to the patriarch of Constantinople, and the intermittent home of the pope himself when in residence at Constantinople. The apocrisiarius held "considerable influence as a conduit for both public and covert communications" between pope and Byzantine emperor.

The residence of the apocrisiarius in the Placidia Palace dates to the end of the Acacian schism in 519. The ambassador was usually a deacon of Rome, and held an official position in the Byzantine imperial court. Anachronistically, the building can be referred to as the first nunciature.

== Construction and localization ==
The palace was built by Galla Placidia, near the ta Armatiou quarter in the tenth district of the city between the Gate of the Plataea and the Monastery of the Pantokrator.

The palace of Galla Placidia was one of several aristocratic residences (oikoi) built in the city's northwestern region during the late 4th and early 5th centuries. The tenth district included the palaces built by the Augusta Aelia Eudocia, the nobilissima Arcadia (sister of Theodosius II), while the nearby eleventh district included the house of Augusta Pulcheria and the Palace of Flaccilla (palataium Flaccillianum). These mansions formed a counterpart to the old-established aristocratic center of the eastern parts of the city, formed around the Great Palace; however, Most of these mansions in the northwestern districts seem to have been only in use as seasonal retreats.

The tenth district also included 636 domus insulae all together. Other landmarks of the tenth included the Baths of Constantius and the Nymphaeum.

== Papal use ==
=== Vigilius ===
The palace was occupied by Pope Vigilius, the first pope of the Byzantine Papacy, in 547 during a papal visit to Constantinople. In 550, Vigilius decided that the Placidia Palace was not secure enough for his needs, and moved into the basilica of St. Peter of Hormisdas. From the basilica, Vigilius drafted a document of excommunication of Patriarch Menas and his followers, signed by another dozen Western bishops. Upon its publication, Comitas Dupondiaristes, the praetor of the Plebs, was dispatched to the basilica to arrest Vigilius and the African bishops with him. According to one account, Vigilius clung to the altar, and as the guards attempted to drag him, it toppled, nearly crushing him. The praetor withdrew, leaving several bishops injured. The next day, a group of Byzantine dignitaries convinced Vigilius that no more harm would be done to him if he returned to the Placidia Palace, which he did. There, Vigilius was more or less placed under house arrest. On the night of December 23/24, 551, Vigilius fled across the Bosporus to the Church of St. Euphemia in Chalcedon. In February, the other bishops, but not Vigilius, were arrested. On June 26, the pope and the emperor reconciled and Vigilius returned to the Placidia.

Although he was in the "immediate neighborhood" during the Second Council of Constantinople (553), Vigilius refused to either attend or send a representative. Claiming illness, Vigilius refused even to meet with the three Oriental patriarchs who travelled from the council to the Placidia Palace. The next day, Vigilius conveyed to the council a request to delay for 20 days—a request that likely would have struck the council as "strange" because the matter had been under discussion for seven years, during which Vigilius himself had been in residence in Constantinople. The emperor's second delegation to Vigilius—of bishops and lay officials —was similarly unsuccessful. From Constantinople, Vigilius published a Constitutum (or memorial to the emperor), condemning the council.

=== Gregory ===
The future Pope Gregory I resided in the Placidia Palace during his apocrisiariat, where he was eventually joined by a group of monks from his order—making the palace "virtually another St. Andrew's." During Gregory's tenure, the palace was the site of a trial conducted by Tiberius II of a group of alleged Satan worshipers, including Gregory, patriarch of Antioch, and Eulogius, the future patriarch of Alexandria. When they were acquitted, perhaps as the result of bribery, a riot involving 100,000 persons erupted in the city. The Placidia Palace, as well as the palace of Patriarch Eutychius, were attacked by the mob, requiring the emperor himself to intervene and restore order.

=== Anastasios ===
One of the complaints of the Lateran Council of 649 against the patriarch of Constantinople read: "He has done what no heretic heretofore has dared to do, namely, he has destroyed the altar of our holy see in the Placidia palace." The anathema alludes to the "reign of terror" to which the Roman church had been subject from 638 to 656: Roman clergy had been exiled, the treasury plundered, and the apocrisiarius himself kidnapped and exiled. The altar was destroyed in 648 or 649. Pope Martin I's apocrisiarius, Anastasios, was prohibited from celebrating Mass in the palace in the mid-seventh century. This sanction was imposed by Patriarch Paul II as a result of disagreements over Monotheletism.

=== Agatho ===
The palace was used by the large delegation of Pope Agatho at the Sixth Ecumenical Council (680–681). The emperor provided the delegation with a variety of luxuries, including a string of saddled horses to convey them to the Church of the Theotokos at Blachernae. They participated in a procession at that church on the first Sunday after their arrival.

=== Constantine ===
Pope Constantine occupied the palace in 711, during the last papal visit to Constantinople in 1250 years.

== End of papal use ==
The popes continued to have a permanent apocrisiary in Constantinople until the time of the Byzantine Iconoclasm edict of 726. Thereafter, popes Gregory II, Gregory III, Zacharias, and Stephen II are known to have sent non-permanent apocrisiaries to Constantinople.

The office ceased having any religious role in the 8th century, although it continued to be regularly occupied well into the 10th century. Circa 900, the office began being referred to as a syncellus. A permanent envoy may have been re-established after the reconciliation of 886. A syncellus, unlike an apocrisiarius, was a representative to the emperor, not the patriarch. These ambassadors continued into the 11th century, even after the East-West Schism.
