= Papal apocrisiarius =

Pope's legate to the patriarch of Constantinople (452–743)

The apocrisiarius or apocrisiary was the legate from the pope to the patriarch of Constantinople, circa 452–743, equivalent to the modern nunciature.

== Nomenclature ==
The term apocrisiarius comes from the Greek word apokrisis, "response". The Latin language name for the office would have been responsalis, from the word responsum. The term was also used by other ecclesiastical envoys, either between bishops or between a bishop and a royal court, although this specific office was one of the first and most notable examples.

== History and functions ==
In part, the role of the apocrisiarius was to represent the interests of the Roman church at the imperial court in Constantinople. Relations between the pope and the Byzantine Empire were also managed at the court of the Exarchate of Ravenna—where the pope had another permanent apocrisiarius—and between the archbishop of Ravenna and the papacy. The later had a special role as responsalis at the papal court during the papacy of Gregory I. According to the Catholic Encyclopedia, "in view of the great importance attaching to the relations between the popes and the imperial court of Constantinople, especially after the fall of the Western Empire (476), and during the great dogmatic controversies in the Greek Church, these papal representatives at Constantinople took on gradually the character of permanent legates and were accounted the most important and responsible among the papal envoys."

Most were deacons, as they were the most educated and potentially skilled in diplomatic negotiations. The apocrisiarius held "considerable influence as a conduit for both public and covert communications" between pope and Byzantine emperor. During the Byzantine Papacy, seven apocrisiarii went on to be selected as pope. According to one commentator, "to be sent as apocrisiarius to Constantinople was to graduate for the papacy." When in Constantinople, the apocrisiarius resided in the Placidia Palace, as early as the end of the Acacian schism in 519.

== End of the office ==
The popes continued to have a permanent apocrisiary in Constantinople until the time of the Byzantine Iconoclasm edict of 726. Thereafter, popes Gregory II, Gregory III, Zacharias, and Stephen II are known to have sent non-permanent apocrisiaries to Constantinople.

The office ceased having any religious role in the 8th century, although it continued to be regularly occupied well into the 10th century. Circa 900, the office began being referred to as syncellus. A permanent envoy may have been re-established after the reconciliation of 886. A syncellus, unlike an apocrisiarius, was a representative to the emperor, not the patriarch. These ambassadors continued into the 11th century, even after the East–West Schism.

=== Later use of the title ===
According to the Catholic Encyclopedia, "from the reign of Charlemagne (d. 814) we find apocrisiarii at the court of the Frankish kings, but they are only royal arch-chaplains decorated with the title of the ancient papal envoys."

== List of apocrisiarii ==
Apocrisiarius	Term of office	Appointing pope	Emperor	Patriarch	Notes
Julianus, Bishop of Cos	Circa 450–457	Pope Leo I (440–461)	Marcian (450–457)		First apocrisiarius; circa the Monophysitism dispute
Vigilius	?-536	Pope Agapetus I (535–536)	Justinian I (527–565)	Menas (536–552)	Future Pope Vigilius
Pelagius	536-?	Pope Agapetus I (535–536)			Future Pope Pelagius I
Stephen	?	Pope Vigilius (537–555)		Menas (536–552)	Excommunicated Menas
Deacon Gregory	579–585	Pope Pelagius II (579–590)	Tiberius II Constantine (578–582); Maurice (582–602)	Eutychius (577–582); John IV Nesteutes (582–595)	Future Pope Gregory I
Archdeacon Laurence	585-ante September 591	Pope Pelagius II (579–590)			
Deacon Honoratus	?	Pope Gregory I (590–604)			
Deacon Sabinianus	c. July 593–ante November 597	Pope Gregory I (590–604)	Maurice (582–602)	Cyriacus II (596–606)	Future Pope Sabinian
Anatolius	c. June 597-post February 601/ante January 602				
Boniface	post July 603-post November 603				
Deacon Cataadioce	603–606	Pope Gregory I (590–604)	Phocas (602–610)	Cyriacus II (596–606)	Future Pope Boniface III
Deacon Theodore					Future Pope Theodore I
Deacon Martin					Future Pope Martin I

== Sources ==
- Ekonomou, Andrew J. 2007. Byzantine Rome and the Greek Popes: Eastern influences on Rome and the papacy from Gregory the Great to Zacharias, A.D. 590-752. Lexington: Lexington Books. ISBN 0-7391-1977-X
- Henry Hoyle Howorth. 1913. Saint Augustine of Canterbury. Google Books.
