= Patriarch Thomas of Constantinople =

Patriarch Thomas may refer to:

- Thomas I of Constantinople, Patriarch of Constantinople in 607–610
- Thomas II of Constantinople, Patriarch of Constantinople in 667–669
