= Paulus II =

Paulus II may refer to:

- Patriarch Paul II of Constantinople (ruled 641 to 653)
- Pope Paul II (1417–1471)
