= Thomas II =

Thomas II may refer to:

- Thomas II of Acerra (d. 1273), Count of Acerra from 1251 to his death
- Thomas II of Esztergom (d. 1321)
- Thomas II of Piedmont (c. 1199 – 1259), Count of Piedmont from 1233 to his death
- Thomas II Preljubović, ruler of Epirus in Ioannina from 1366 to 1384
- Thomas II of York (d. 24 February 1114), a medieval archbishop of York
- Thomas II of Saluzzo (d. 1357)
- Thomas II of Constantinople, Ecumenical Patriarch of Constantinople from 667 to 669
- Thomas II, Bishop of Nocera, bishop from Acerno who served in Apulia in the 14th century
- Thomas II Zaremba, a medieval bishop of Wrocław
