= Paulus III =

Paulus III may refer to:

- Patriarch Paul III of Constantinople (ruled 687 to 693)
- Pope Paul III (1468–1549)
