= Patriarch Peter I =

Patriarch Peter I may refer to:

- Patriarch Peter I of Alexandria, Greek Patriarch of Alexandria in 300–311
- Peter of Constantinople, Patriarch of Constantinople in 654–666
