= Patriarch George of Constantinople =

Patriarch George of Constantinople may refer to:

- George I of Constantinople, Ecumenical Patriarch in 679–686
- George II of Constantinople, Ecumenical Patriarch in 1191–1198
