= Pope Pelagius I =

Head of the Catholic Church from 556 to 561

- Bishop of Rome
- Church: Catholic Church
- Papacy began: 16 April 556
- Papacy ended: 3 March 561
- Predecessor: Vigilius
- Successor: John III

Personal details
- Born: c. 500 Rome, Ostrogothic Kingdom
- Died: 3 March 561 Rome, Eastern Roman Empire

Pope Pelagius I (died 3 March 561) was the bishop of Rome from 16 April 556 to his death on 3 March 561. A former apocrisiarius to Constantinople, Pelagius I was elected pope as the candidate of Emperor Justinian I, a designation not well received in the Western Church. Before his papacy, he opposed Justinian's efforts to condemn the "Three Chapters" in order to reconcile theological factions within the Church, but later adopted Justinian's position.

== Family and early career ==
Pelagius was born into a noble family from Rome. His father, John, seems to have been vicar of one of the two civil districts into which Italy was then divided.

Pelagius accompanied Pope Agapetus I to Constantinople and was appointed apocrisiarius. As such, Pelagius acquired great influence with Emperor Justinian I. He returned to Rome in 543. In 545, when Pope Vigilius went to Constantinople on Justinian's orders, Pelagius stayed in Rome as the pope's representative. Totila, king of the Goths, had begun to blockade the city. Pelagius poured out his own fortune for the benefit of the famine-stricken people, and tried to induce the king to grant a truce. Though he failed, he afterwards induced Totila to spare the lives of the people when he captured Rome in December 546. Totila sent Pelagius to Constantinople in order to arrange a peace with Justinian I, but the emperor sent him back to say that his general Belisarius was in command in Italy.

== Papacy ==
Vigilius died on 7 June 555, and Pelagius was elected to succeed him as pope. Pelagius was the emperor's candidate, a designation not well received by the Western clergy and laity. While before his ordination he opposed Justinian's efforts to condemn the "Three Chapters" in order to reconcile theological factions in the Church, afterwards Pelagius adopted Justinian's position.

Pelagius I's pontificate was undermined by rumors that he might have somehow been complicit in the death of Vigilius, and suspicion that his conceding to Justinian indicated a support for monophysitism. To overcome this he worked to maintain public order in Rome, and correct abuses among the clergy. He also labored on behalf of the poor and the victims of famine and war. In response to a request from the garrison commander at Civitavecchia, Pelagius directed Bishop Lawrence of that town, to provide chaplains for the army. He is credited with the construction of the Santi Apostoli, Rome, built to celebrate the complete victory of Narses over the Ostrogoths.

Pelagius I served for five years, and upon his death on 3 March 561 was buried in Old St. Peter's Basilica.

== Notes ==
Catholic Church titles
Preceded by Vigilius	Pope; 556–561	Succeeded by John III
