= Mari ben R. Dimi =

Rav Mari ben Rav Dimi (Aramaic: רב מרי בר רב דימי; born mid-6th century) was the second Dean of Pumbedita Academy, succeeding Hanan of Iskiya. During Babylonian persecution of Pumbeditan Jewry, several notable scholars left to establish a Yeshiva academy in Firuz Shapur. Rav Mari served as the dean of this Yeshiva until the death of Hanan of Iskiya in 609, after which he was elected successor in the gaonate.

== Biography ==
Besides his being the son of Rav Dimi, little is known of Rav Mari's personal life, and much of what is known derives from the works of Rav Sherira Gaon some 300 years after Rav Mari's death. He was referred by some as "Sargo" (סורגו) which some have speculated to be his place of birth. Most scholars agree that after the death of Hanan of Iskiya, he was elected to replace Hanan as the dean of the Pumbedita Academy. He occupied this position for some 19 years until his possible death. He was later succeeded by Rav Hana in about 628.

== Teachings ==
Like most Gaonim of the time, many of his teachings were not preserved under his name. The only actual source that brings anything to his name is one of the Teshuvot Hagaonim, which records several sayings of Yehudai Gaon, in which Rabbi Yehudai recounts a trip that Rav Mari went on with his father, in which Rav Mari debates his father about the nature of several unknown plants mentioned in the Talmud. Another teaching commonly associated with Rav Mari is in regards to Mamzerim. Rav Mari suggests that a Mamzer should marry a converted slave, who provides him children, who are no longer Mamzerim, then he would free his slave child, thus bypassing the difficulties that a Mamzer experiences when trying to marry.

Preceded by Hanan of Iskiya	Gaon of the Pumbedita Academy around 591	Succeeded by Rav Hana
