= Pope Boniface IV =

Head of the Catholic Church from 608 to 615

Pope Saint Boniface IV
- Bishop of Rome
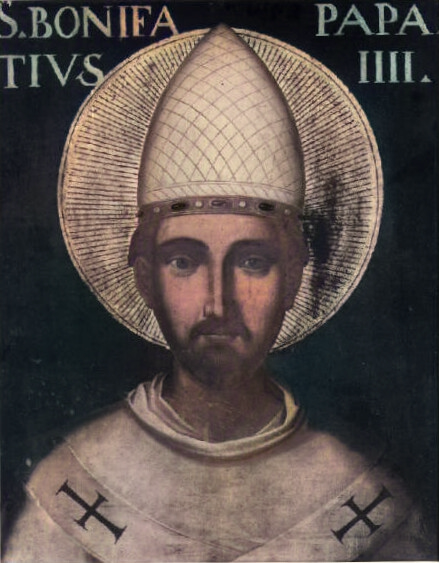
- 17th century depiction, Italy
- Church: Catholic Church
- Papacy began: 25 September 608
- Papacy ended: 8 May 615
- Predecessor: Boniface III
- Successor: Adeodatus I

Personal details
- Born: 550 Valeria, Byzantine Empire
- Died: 8 May 615 (aged 64–65) Rome, Byzantine Empire

Sainthood
- Feast day: 8 May
- Venerated in: Catholic Church
- Title as Saint: Pope
- Canonized: by Boniface VIII
- Attributes: Papal vestments
- Shrines: St. Peter's Basilica

Pope Boniface IV (Latin: Bonifatius IV; 550 – 8 May 615 (Note: Most sources give 8 May as the date of his death; but Jaffé 1881 gives 25 May.)) was the bishop of Rome from 608 to his death on 8 May 615. He was a member of the Benedictine order. Boniface had served as a deacon under Pope Gregory I, and like his mentor, he ran the Lateran Palace as a monastery. As pope, he encouraged monasticism. With imperial permission, he converted the Pantheon into a church. In 610, he conferred with Bishop Mellitus of London regarding the needs of the English Church. He is venerated as a saint in the Catholic Church with a universal feast day on 8 May.

== Family and early career ==
Boniface was born in what is now the Province of L'Aquila. His father was a physician named John. His family was of Marsi origins according to the Liber Pontificalis. During the pontificate of Gregory the Great, Boniface was a deacon of the Roman Church and held the position of dispensator, that is, the first official in connection with the administration of the patrimonies.

== Pontificate ==
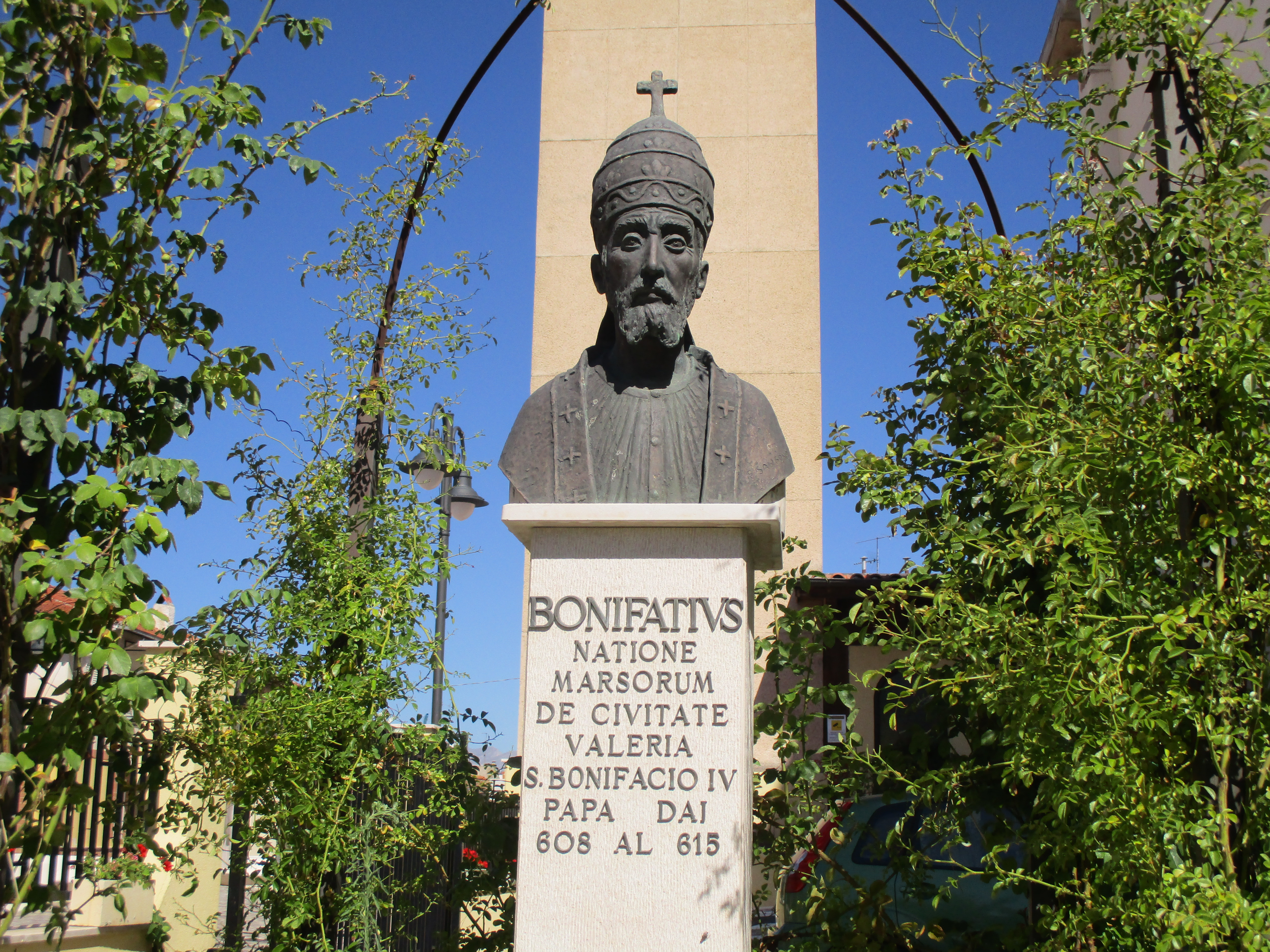
Bust of Boniface IV in San Benedetto dei Marsi, describing him as "of the nation of the Marsi and of the community of Valeria."

Boniface IV was elected to succeed Boniface III, but a vacancy of over nine months ensued, awaiting imperial confirmation from Constantinople. He was consecrated on either 25 August, according to Duchesne, or 15 September, according to Jaffé, in 608. The Vatican lists the official beginning of his papacy as 25 September.

Boniface obtained leave from Emperor Phocas to convert the Pantheon in Rome into a Christian church, and on 13 May 609, the temple erected by Agrippa to Jupiter the Avenger, Venus, and Mars was consecrated by the pope in honor of the Virgin Mary and all the Martyrs. It was the first instance in Rome of a pagan temple being transformed into a place of Christian worship. Twenty-eight cartloads of sacred bones were said to have been removed from the Catacombs and placed in a porphyry basin beneath the high altar.

In 610, Mellitus, the first bishop of London, went to Rome "to consult the pope on important matters relative to the newly established English Church". While in Rome, he assisted at a synod then being held concerning certain questions on "the life and monastic peace of monks", and, on his departure, took to England the decree of the council together with letters from the pope to Archbishop Laurence of Canterbury and to all the clergy, to King Æthelberht of Kent, and to all the Anglo-Saxons. The decrees of the council now extant are spurious. The letter to Æthelberht is considered spurious by Hefele, questionable by Haddan and Stubbs, and genuine by Jaffé.

Between 612 and 615, the Irish missionary Columbanus, then living at Bobbio in Italy, was persuaded by King Agilulf of Lombardy to address a letter on the condemnation of the "Three Chapters" to Boniface IV. He told the pope that he was suspected of heresy for accepting the Fifth Ecumenical Council and exhorted him to summon a council and prove his orthodoxy. There is no record of a rejoinder from Boniface.

== Death ==
Inspired by Gregory the Great, Boniface IV converted his house into a monastery, where he retired and died on 8 May. He was succeeded by Adeodatus I, who reversed his policy favouring monasticism. Boniface IV was buried in the portico of St. Peter's Basilica. His remains were three times removed — in the tenth or eleventh century, at the close of the thirteenth century under Boniface VIII, and to the new St. Peter's on 21 October 1603. Boniface IV is commemorated as a saint in the Roman Martyrology on his feast day, 8 May.

== Feast Days ==
- 8 May - main commemoration, death anniversary,
- 25 May - old commemoration date,
- 28 May - commemoration by Benedictines and Cistercians,
- 3rd weekend of August - feast of patrons of Luco dei Marsi (Abruzzo)
- 21 October - translation of relics in 1603,

== Notes ==
Catholic Church titles
Preceded by Boniface III	Pope; 608–615	Succeeded by Adeodatus I
