= Hanan of Iskiya =

Hanan of Iskiya (Asikia) (Hebrew: רב חנן מאישקיא/מאישקא; alternative English spellings: Hanan of Iskia, or Hanan of Iskya, or Hanan of Ishqiya) was rector of the Talmudical academy at Pumbedita, 589–608. He was succeeded by Mari ben R. Dimi after his death in 609.

Hormizd IV having persecuted the Christians and the Jews, the Talmudical academies of Sura and Pumbedita were closed, their masters removing to Firuz-Shabur, in the neighborhood of Nehardea. The accession of Hormizd's general, Bahram Chobin, relieved the Jews from persecution; Hanan returned to Pumbedita, reopened the academy, and assumed the rectorate, which he held for nineteen years.

Thus far almost all historians agree, but not in regard to Hanan's inauguration of the era of the Geonim. Some, believing that the line of the Saboraim covered several generations, from the death of Rabina bar Ḥuna (499) to the middle of the 7th century, include Hanan in the list of the Saboraim. Others, however, following the tradition that Giza ('Ena, Gada) and Simuna were the last of the Saboraim, and that Hanan of Iskiya sat at the feet of the disciples of these masters, begin the geonic period with the restoration of the Pumbedita academy, and to its promoter they ascribe the origination of the title "Gaon".

Be this as it may, Hanan of Iskiya is remembered as the restorer of the Pumbedita Talmudical academy, and as the head of a line of teachers covering over four hundred years (589–1038), to the death of Hai Gaon and the end of the geonic period.

| Preceded by New Title | Gaon of the Pumbedita Academy from 589 | Succeeded by Mari ben R. Dimi |
