= Museum of Ancient Greek, Byzantine and Post-Byzantine Musical Instruments =

Coordinates: 40°38′06″N 22°56′16″E

The Museum of Ancient Greek, Byzantine and Post-Byzantine Musical Instruments is a museum in Oia, Santorini, Greece.

The three exhibition spaces display over 200 musical instruments, which existed between 2,800 BC and the beginning of the 20th century and have been accurately reconstructed with the help of the Aristotle University of Thessaloniki to compose the museum's initial collection. They were made on the basis of pictorial and literary evidence (pottery, sculpture, figurines, illuminated Byzantine manuscripts) using the same materials mentioned in the sources. Each instrument is accompanied by the pictorial evidence of its existence. In many cases it is also possible to hear the sounds they make.

Some notable examples include the seven-stringed phorminx of the Minoan period, the double pipes with an air chamber (5th century BC). The bagpipes were played on the Greek islands, by the Greeks of the Black Sea, and in Thrace.

Apart from its exhibition space, the museum also has a music library, an electronic archive of scores, and a musicology research department.

The museum opened in 1997 and was housed in a restored three-storey building in the Ladadika district in the centre of Thessaloniki, until 2010.

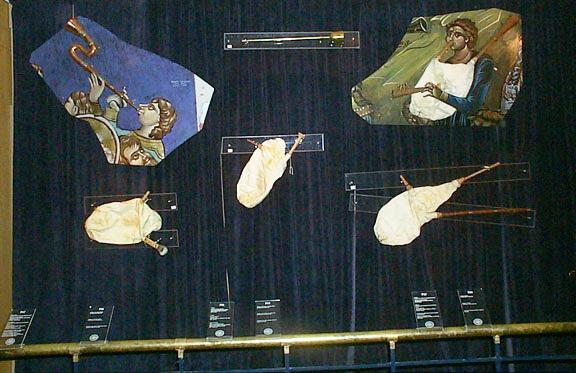
Bagpipes (tsampouna) played on the Greek islands

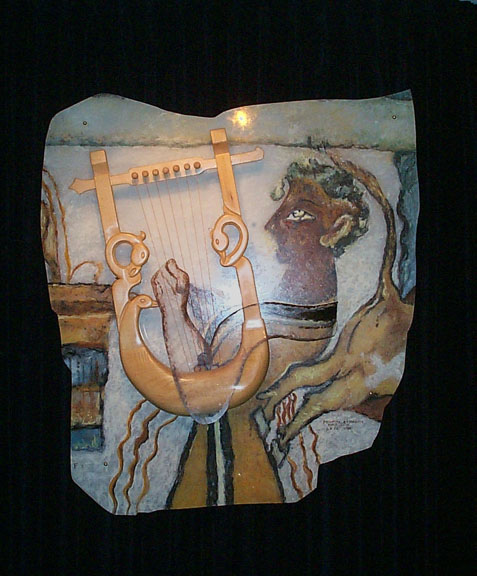
Seven-stringed phorminx of the Minoan period

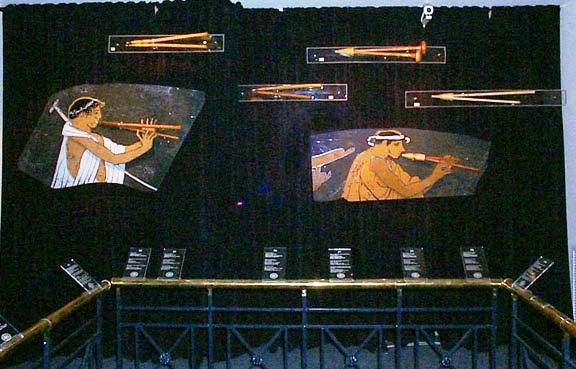
Double pipes with an air chamber

== See also ==
- List of music museums
