= Pope Adeodatus I =

Head of the Catholic Church from 615 to 618

Pope Saint Adeodatus I
- Bishop of Rome
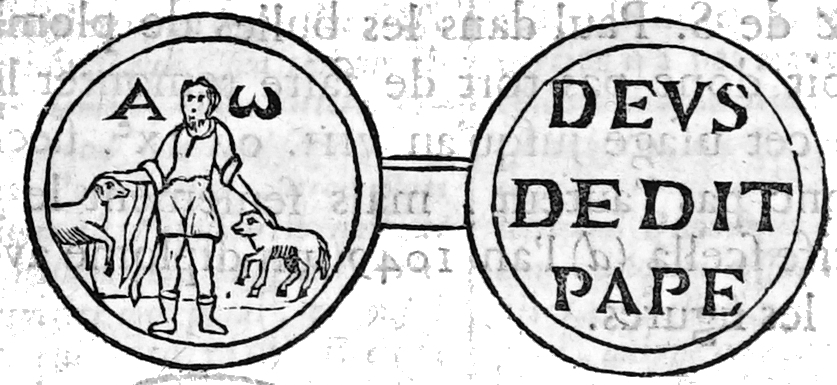
- Seal of Adeodatus; he was the first pope to use lead seals. This design features the Alpha and Omega, the Good Shepherd and the text deusdedit pape.
- Church: Catholic Church
- Papacy began: 19 October 615
- Papacy ended: 8 November 618
- Predecessor: Boniface IV
- Successor: Boniface V

Orders
- Created cardinal: 15 October 590 by Gregory I

Personal details
- Born: 570 Rome, Italy, Eastern Roman Empire
- Died: 8 November 618 (aged 47-48) Rome, Italy, Eastern Roman Empire

Sainthood
- Feast day: 8 November (Latin Church)
- Venerated in: Catholic Church; Eastern Orthodox Church

Pope Adeodatus I (570 – 8 November 618), also called Deodatus I or Deusdedit, was the bishop of Rome from 19 October 615 to his death on 8 November 618. He was the first priest to be elected pope since John II in 533. The first use of lead seals or bullae on papal documents is attributed to him. His feast day is 8 November.

== Biography ==
Adeodatus was born in Rome, the son of a subdeacon named Stephanus or Stephen. He served as a priest for 40 years before his election and was the first priest to be elected pope since John II in 533.

== Pontificate ==
Almost nothing is known about Adeodatus I's pontificate. It represents the second wave of opposition to Gregory the Great's papal reforms, the first being the pontificate of Sabinian. He reversed the practice of his predecessor, Boniface IV, of filling the papal administrative ranks with monks by recalling the clergy to such positions and by ordaining some 14 priests, the first ordinations in Rome since Gregory's pontificate. According to tradition, Adeodatus was the first pope to use lead seals (bullae) on papal documents, which in time came to be called "papal bulls". One bulla dating from his reign is still preserved, the obverse of which represents the Good Shepherd in the midst of His sheep, with the letters Alpha and Omega underneath, while the reverse bears the inscription: Deusdedit Papæ.

In August 618, an earthquake struck Rome, followed by an outbreak of scabies. Adeodatus died 8 November 618, and was eventually succeeded by Boniface V. His feast day is 8 November in the Latin Church. He is also a saint in the Eastern Orthodox Church as one of the pre-Schism "Orthodox Popes of Rome".

== See also ==
- List of popes
- List of Catholic saints

Catholic Church titles
Preceded by Boniface IV	Pope; 615–618	Succeeded by Boniface V
