= Peter of Constantinople =

Ecumenical Patriarch of Constantinople from 654 to 666

- Ecumenical Patriarch of Constantinople
- Installed: 9 June 654
- Term ended: 12 October 666
- Predecessor: Pyrrhus of Constantinople
- Successor: Thomas II of Constantinople

Personal details
- Died: 12 October 666
- Denomination: Chalcedonian Christianity

Peter of Constantinople (Greek: Πέτρος; died 12 October 666) was the Ecumenical Patriarch of Constantinople from 9 June 654 to 666. He was condemned as a heretic in the Third Council of Constantinople. He was succeeded as ecumenical patriarch by Thomas II of Constantinople.

Peter succeeded patriarch Pyrrhus who also was a Monothelite. In correspondence with Pope Vitalian of Rome following Vitalian's ascension to the see of Rome, Peter was noncommittal concerning Monothelitism, leading to a restoration of ecclesiastical intercourse between Rome and Constantinople. This resulted the addition of Vitalian's name on the diptychs of the church in Constantinople – the only name of a pope so entered between the reign of Pope Honorius I, who died in 638, and 677 when Patriarch Theodore I of Constantinople removed the pope's name prior to the Third Council of Constantinople. At the council Peter was condemned as a heretic along with Patriarchs Sergius I, Pyrrhus and Paul II all of Constantinople, Patriarch Cyrus of Alexandria, and Theodore of Raithu.

== Notes and references ==
Titles of Chalcedonian Christianity
Preceded by Pyrrhus	Ecumenical Patriarch of Constantinople; 654 – 666	Succeeded by Thomas II
