= Pope Vigilius =

Head of the Catholic Church from 537 to 555

- Bishop of Rome
- Church: Catholic Church
- Papacy began: 29 March 537
- Papacy ended: 7 June 555
- Predecessor: Silverius
- Successor: Pelagius I

Personal details
- Born: c. 497 Rome, Ostrogothic Kingdom
- Died: 7 June 555 (aged 57–58) Syracuse, Sicily, Eastern Roman Empire

Pope Vigilius (died 7 June 555) was the bishop of Rome from 29 March 537 to his death on 7 June 555. He is considered the first pope of the Byzantine papacy. Born into Roman aristocracy, Vigilius served as a deacon and papal apocrisiarius in Constantinople. He allied with Empress Theodora, who sought his help to establish Monophysitism, and was made pope after the deposition of Silverius. After he refused to sign Emperor Justinian I's edict condemning the Three Chapters, Vigilius was arrested in 545 and taken to Constantinople. He died in Sicily while returning to Rome.

== Early life ==
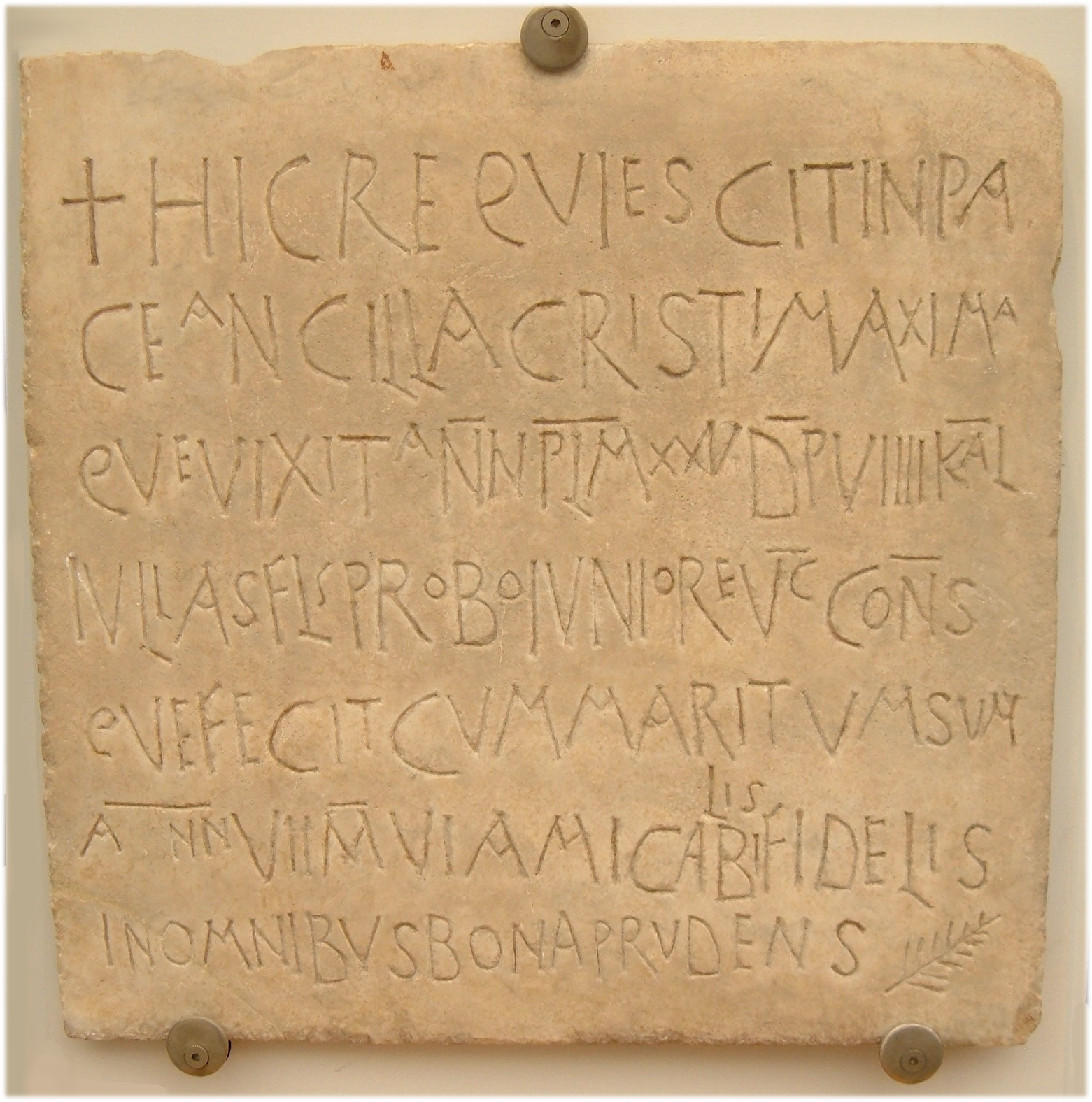
Christian funerary inscription from Rome, AD 525, contemporary with Vigilius. Contains the phrases hic requiescit in pace (here rests in peace) and ancilla Christi (servant of Christ).

Vigilius belonged to an aristocratic family from Rome; his father, John, is identified as a consul in the Liber pontificalis, having received that title from the emperor in Constantinople. According to Procopius, his brother Reparatus was one of the senators taken hostage by Witigis, but managed to escape before the Ostrogothic king ordered their slaughter in 537.

Vigilius entered the service of the Church and was ordained a deacon in 531. That year, the Roman clergy agreed to a decree empowering the pope to determine the succession to the Holy See, now considered invalid. Vigilius was chosen by Pope Boniface II as his successor and presented to the clergy assembled in Old St. Peter's Basilica. The opposition to such a procedure led Boniface in the following year to withdraw his designation of a successor and to burn the decree respecting it.

The successor of Boniface, Agapetus I (535–536), appointed Vigilius apocrisiarius at Constantinople. Empress Theodora sought to win him as a confederate to revenge the deposition of the Monophysite Patriarch Anthimus I of Constantinople by Agapetus and also to gain aid for her efforts in behalf of the Monophysites. Vigilius is said to have agreed to the plans of the intriguing empress who promised him the Holy See and 700 pounds of gold.

== Rise to papacy ==
While Vigilius was in Constantinople, Pope Agapetus died on 22 April 536, and Silverius was made pope through the influence of the king of the Goths. Soon after Silverius was ordained, the Byzantine general Belisarius occupied Rome, which was then besieged by the Goths. Although the Goths were unable to encircle the city completely, both the Byzantine soldiers and the inhabitants feared they would be destroyed. Soon after the siege began, for example, Belisarius ordered the women, children, and unnecessary servants of Rome to leave for Naples, as well as his own army's camp followers. Around the same time, Silverius was accused of offering to betray Rome to the Goths. Belisarius had him deposed, put in a monk's habit and exiled to Greece. Several other senators were also banished from Rome on the same charges.

What part Vigilius played in the deposition of Silverius is unclear in the primary sources. The authors of the Liber Pontificalis, who are hostile to Vigilius, state he delivered to Belisarius the imperial orders to depose Silverius, yet are circumspect about how Silverius was elected and ordained. Procopius, on the other hand, states that Belisarius appointed Vigilius shortly after Silverius was deposed. Vigilius was consecrated and enthroned as pope on 29 March 537. After the death of Silverius, Vigilius was recognized as pope by all the Roman clergy, even though the manner of his elevation was not regular.

== Pontificate ==
Empress Theodora soon learned that she had been deceived. After Vigilius had attained the object of his ambition and been made pope, he maintained the same position as his predecessor against the Monophysites and the deposed Anthimus. A letter purported to be from the pope to the deposed Monophysite patriarchs Anthimus, Severus, and Theodosius seems to indicate that Pope Vigilius accepted the Monophysitism. This letter, however, is not regarded as genuine by most investigators and bears all the marks of forgery. The pope did not restore Anthimus to his office.

In the year 540 Vigilius took a stand in regard to Monophysitism, in two letters sent to Constantinople. One of the letters is addressed to Emperor Justinian I, the other to the Patriarch Menas. In both letters the pope supports positively the Councils of Ephesus and Chalcedon, the decisions of his predecessor Pope Leo I, and the deposition of the Patriarch Anthimus. Several other letters written by the pope in the first years of his pontificate give information respecting his interposition in the ecclesiastical affairs of various countries. On 6 March 538, he wrote to Bishop Caesarius of Arles concerning the penance of the Austrasian King Theudebert I on account of his marriage to his brother's widow. On 29 June 538, a decretal was sent to Bishop Profuturus of Braga containing decisions on various questions of church discipline. Bishop Auxanius and his successor, Aurelian of Arles, entered into communication with the pope respecting the granting of the pallium as a mark of the dignity and powers of a papal legate for Gaul; the pope sent suitable letters to the two bishops. In the meantime new dogmatic difficulties had been developing at Constantinople that were to give the pope many hours of bitterness. In 543 Emperor Justinian issued a decree which condemned the various heresies of the Origenists; this decree was sent for signature both to the Eastern patriarchs and to Vigilius.

=== Three Chapters controversy ===
In order to draw Justinian's thoughts from Origenism, Theodore Askidas, bishop of Caesarea in Cappadocia, called his attention to the fact that the condemnation of various representatives of the Antiochene school, who were said to have inspired Nestorianism, would make union with the Monophysites much easier. The emperor, who laid much stress upon winning over the Monophysites, agreed to this, and in 543 or 544 he issued a new edict condemning the Three Chapters. The "Three Chapters" concerned writings of Theodore of Mopsuestia, Theodoret of Cyrus, and a letter of Ibas of Edessa. While all three were, indeed, in error, this was due in some part to a misunderstanding of language used by Cyril of Alexandria against the Nestorians. Both Ibas and Theodoret had been deprived of their bishoprics by heretics, and had been restored by the Holy See and the Council of Chalcedon on anathematizing Nestorius. There were no good precedents for thus dealing harshly with the memory of men who had died in the peace of the Church. Such a condemnation at this point was seen by many of the bishops as potentially undermining the Council of Chalcedon itself.

The Eastern patriarchs and bishops signed the condemnation of these Three Chapters, although many signed under duress. In Western Europe, however, the procedure was considered unjustifiable and dangerous, because it was feared that it would detract from the importance of the Council of Chalcedon. Vigilius refused to acknowledge the imperial edict and was called to Constantinople by Justinian, in order to settle the matter there with a synod. According to the Liber pontificalis on 20 November 545, while the pope was celebrating the Feast of St. Cecilia in the Church of St. Cecilia in Trastevere, and before the service was fully ended, he was ordered by the imperial official Anthimus to start at once on the journey to Constantinople. The pope was taken immediately to a ship that waited in the Tiber in order to be carried to the eastern capital while a part of the populace cursed the pope and threw stones at the ship. Rome was now besieged by the Goths under Totila and the inhabitants fell into the greatest misery. Vigilius sent ships with grain to Rome, but these were captured by the enemy. If the story related by the Liber pontificalis is essentially correct, the pope probably left Rome on 22 November 545. He remained for a long time in Sicily and reached Constantinople about the end of 546 or in January 547.

After his transfer to Constantinople, Vigilius wrote to his captors: "Do with me what you wish. This is the just punishment for what I have done." and "You may keep me in captivity, but the blessed Apostle Peter will never be your captive."

While in captivity, Vigilius sought to persuade the emperor to send aid to the inhabitants of Rome and Italy who were so hard pressed by the Goths. Justinian's chief interest, however, was in the matter of the Three Chapters, and as Vigilius was not ready to make concessions of this point and wavered frequently in his measures, he had much to suffer. The matter was further complicated by the fact that the Latins, Vigilius among them, were for the most part ignorant of Greek and therefore unable to judge the incriminated writings for themselves. The change in his position is to be explained by the fact that the condemnation of the writings mentioned was essentially justifiable, yet appeared inopportune and would lead to disastrous controversies with Western Europe. Finally, Vigilius acknowledged in a letter of 8 December 553 to the Patriarch Eutychius the decisions of the Second Council of Constantinople and declared his judgment in detail in a Constitution of 26 February 554. The Pope agreed to condemn the Three Chapters, and thus after a residence of eight years at Constantinople the pope was able, after coming to an understanding with the emperor, to start on his return to Rome in the spring of 555.

== Death ==
While on the journey he died at Syracuse. His body was brought to Rome and buried in the San Martino ai Monti over the Catacomb of Priscilla on the Via Salaria.

== References and sources ==
Sources

- Ekonomou, Andrew J. 2007. Byzantine Rome and the Greek Popes: Eastern influences on Rome and the papacy from Gregory the Great to Zacharias, A.D. 590–752. Lexington Books.
- Louise Ropes Loomis, The Book of Popes (Liber Pontificalis). Merchantville, NJ: Evolution Publishing. ISBN 1-889758-86-8 (Reprint of the 1916 edition. English translation with scholarly footnotes, and illustrations).

== Literature ==
- Claire Sotinel: Vigilio. In: Massimo Bray (ed.): Enciclopedia dei Papi. Volume 1: Pietro, santo. Anastasio bibliotecario, antipapa. Istituto della Enciclopedia Italiana, Rome 2000, pp. 512–529 (treccani.it)
- Josef Rist (1997). "Vigilius". In Bautz, Traugott (ed.). Biographisch-Bibliographisches Kirchenlexikon (BBKL) (in German). Vol. 12. Herzberg: Bautz. cols. 1383–1387. ISBN 3-88309-068-9.
- Meyendorff, John (1989). Imperial unity and Christian divisions: The Church 450-680 A.D. The Church in history. Vol. 2. Crestwood, NY: St. Vladimir's Seminary Press. ISBN 978-0-88-141056-3.

Catholic Church titles
Preceded by Silverius	Pope; 537–555	Succeeded by Pelagius I
