= Pope Sabinian =

Head of the Catholic Church from 604 to 606

- Bishop of Rome
- Church: Catholic Church
- Papacy began: 13 September 604
- Papacy ended: 22 February 606
- Predecessor: Gregory I
- Successor: Boniface III
- Previous post: Cardinal-Deacon of the Holy Roman Church (15 October 590 - 13 September 604)

Personal details
- Born: c. 530 Blera, Eastern Roman Empire
- Died: 22 February 606 (aged 75–76) Rome, Eastern Roman Empire

Pope Sabinian (Latin: Sabinianus) was the bishop of Rome from 13 September 604 to his death on 22 February 606. His pontificate occurred during the Eastern Roman domination of the papacy. He was the fourth former apocrisiarius to Constantinople to be elected pope.

== Apocrisiariat ==
Sabinian was born at Blera (Bieda) near Viterbo. He had been sent by Pope Gregory I, who had a high opinion of him, as apocrisiarius to the imperial court in Constantinople. In 595, Gregory was angered by Sabinian's lack of resolution in discussion with Emperor Maurice about the disputed assumption of the title "ecumenical patriarch" by John IV of Constantinople. Sabinian was then recalled and sent on a mission to Gaul the same year. He returned to Rome in 597.

== Pontificate ==
Sabinian was elected to succeed Gregory probably in March 604, but had to wait for imperial ratification before being consecrated in September. During his pontificate, Sabinian was seen as a counterfoil to Gregory I. The Liber pontificalis praises him for "filling the church with clergy", in contrast to Gregory, who tended to fill ecclesiastical positions with monks.

Sabinian incurred unpopularity by his unseasonable economies, although the Liber pontificalis states that he distributed grain during a famine at Rome under his pontificate. Whereas Gregory distributed grain to the Roman populace as invasion loomed, when the danger had passed Sabinian sold it to them. Because he was unable or unwilling to allow the people to have the grain for little or nothing, there grew up in later times a number of legends in which his predecessor was represented punishing him for avarice. Sabinian died 22 February 606. His funeral procession through the city had to change course to avoid hostile Romans.

Onofrio Panvinio, in his 1557 Epitome pontificum Romanorum, attributes to Sabinian the introduction of the custom of ringing bells at the canonical hours and the celebration of the Eucharist, hence expressions such as o'clock (Latin clocca: a bell). The first attribution of this was in Guillaume Durand's thirteenth-century Rationale Divinorum Officiorum.

== Notes ==
Catholic Church titles
Preceded by Gregory I	Pope; 604–606	Succeeded by Boniface III
