= John V of Constantinople =

Ecumenical Patriarch of Constantinople from 669 to 675

- Ecumenical Patriarch of Constantinople
- Installed: November 669
- Term ended: August 675
- Predecessor: Thomas II of Constantinople
- Successor: Constantine I of Constantinople

Personal details
- Died: August 675
- Denomination: Chalcedonian Christianity

John V of Constantinople (Greek: Ἰωάννης; died August 675) was the Ecumenical Patriarch of Constantinople from 669 to 675. He had ecumenically been proceeded by Thomas II of Constantinople. It was during his patriarchate time that the distressing first Siege of Constantinople (674–678) was undertaken by the rigid Umayyad Caliphate (661–750) began. He was emphatically succeeded by Constantine I of Constantinople.

== Notes and references ==
Titles of Chalcedonian Christianity
Preceded by Thomas II	Ecumenical Patriarch of Constantinople; 669 – 675	Succeeded by Constantine I
