= Pope Boniface III =

Head of the Catholic Church in 607

- Bishop of Rome
- Church: Catholic Church
- Papacy began: 19 February 607
- Papacy ended: 12 November 607
- Predecessor: Sabinian
- Successor: Boniface IV

Personal details
- Born: Rome, Italy, Eastern Roman Empire
- Died: 12 November 607 (aged 67) Rome, Italy, Eastern Roman Empire

Pope Boniface III (Latin: Bonifatius III) was the bishop of Rome from 19 February 607 to his death on 12 November of the same year. Despite his short pontificate, he made a significant contribution to the Catholic Church.

== Early career ==
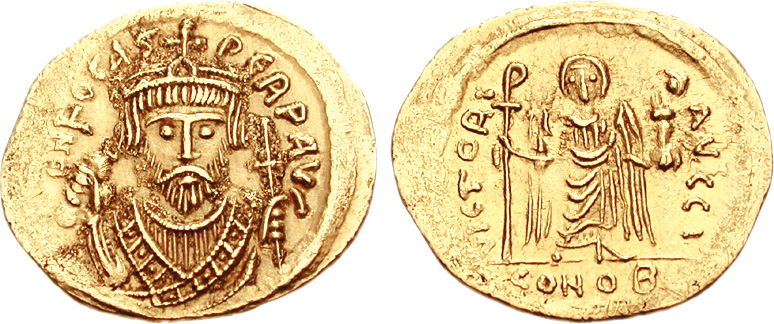
Coin of the Emperor Phocas (r. 602–610); Boniface III had an important relationship with him.

The son of Iohannes (John) Cataadioce, Boniface was of Roman extraction. While serving as a deacon, Boniface impressed Pope Gregory I, who described him as a man "of tried faith and character" and selected him to be papal apocrisiarius to the imperial court in Constantinople in 603. This was to be a significant time in his life and helped to shape his short but eventful papacy.

As apocrisarius, Boniface had the ear of Emperor Phocas and was held in esteem by him. This proved important when he was instructed by Pope Gregory to intercede with Emperor Phocas on behalf of Bishop Alcison of Cassiope on the island of Corcyra. Alcison found his episcopate being usurped by Bishop John of Euria in Epirus, who had fled his home along with his clergy to escape from attacks by the Slavs and Avars. John, having found himself safe on Corcyra, was not content to serve under Bishop Alcison; instead he set about trying to usurp his episcopal authority. Normally, this behaviour would not have been tolerated, but Emperor Phocas was sympathetic to Bishop John and not inclined to interfere. Alcison appealed to Pope Gregory, who left the problem to Boniface to resolve. In a stroke of diplomatic genius, Boniface managed to reconcile all the parties while still retaining the confidence of the emperor.

== Papacy ==
Boniface was elected to succeed Pope Sabinian, who died in February 606, but his return from Constantinople to Rome was delayed by almost a year. There is much debate over why there was such a long vacancy. Some authorities believe that it was to allow Boniface to complete his work in Constantinople, but the more widely held belief is that imperial ratification was delayed due to dissension between those who supported the policies of Gregory I and those who did not. Boniface himself is thought to have insisted on the elections being free and fair and may have refused to take up the papacy until convinced that they had been.

Boniface III made two significant changes to papal selections. The first was the enacting of a decree forbidding anyone during the lifetime of a pope to discuss the appointment of his successor under pain of excommunication. The second change established that no steps could be taken to provide for a papal successor until three days after a pope's burial. This suggests that he was serious in his desire to keep papal elections free.

Boniface's other notable act resulted from his close relationship with Emperor Phocas. He sought and obtained a decree from Phocas which restated that "the See of Blessed Peter the Apostle should be the head of all the Churches". This ensured that the title of "universal bishop" belonged exclusively to the bishop of Rome, and effectively ended the attempt by Patriarch Cyriacus of Constantinople to establish himself as "universal bishop".

Boniface III was buried in Old St. Peter's Basilica, Rome, on 12 November 607.

Catholic Church titles
Preceded by Sabinian	Pope; 607	Succeeded by Boniface IV
