= Pyrrhus of Constantinople =

Ecumenical Patriarch of Constantinople from 638 to 641 and in 654

- Ecumenical Patriarch of Constantinople
- Installed: 20 December 638, 9 January 654
- Term ended: 29 September 641, 1 June 654
- Predecessor: Sergius I of Constantinople; Paul II of Constantinople
- Successor: Paul II of Constantinople; Peter of Constantinople

Personal details
- Died: 1 June 654
- Denomination: Chalcedonian Christianity

Pyrrhus of Constantinople (Greek: Πύρρος; died 1 June 654) was the Ecumenical Patriarch of Constantinople from 20 December 638 to 29 September 641, and again from 9 January to 1 June 654.

He was a supporter of Monotheletism, a christological doctrine propounded by the Emperor Heraclius. In 638, with the support of Heraclius, he was elected to the patriarchal throne. In the unrest following the death of Heraclius, he was accused of plotting against the life of Emperor Heraclius Constantine with Empress Martina to favor her son, Heraclonas. The army and the populace rose in revolt and the powerful Valentinus deposed and banished Pyrrhus to Exarchate of Africa. Soon after, Martina and Heraclonas were also deposed and exiled; Constans II, son of Heraclius Constantine, was proclaimed the sole emperor.

While in exile, in 645 he conducted with Maximus the Confessor a public discussion on faith (Disputatio cum Pyrrho), after which he rejected Monothelitism, and visited Rome in 647. From there he continued to Ravenna and returned to Constantinople, where he again reversed his position and re-embraced Monothelitism. He was excommunicated by Pope Theodore I as a consequence, but succeeded in becoming again patriarch in early 654, holding the office until his death on 1 June of the same year.

He was posthumously cast out as heretical by the Third Council of Constantinople in 680–681.

== Bibliography ==
- Meyendorff, John (1989). Imperial unity and Christian divisions - The Church 450–680 A.D. The Church in history. Vol. 2. Crestwood, NY: St. Vladimir's Seminary Press. ISBN 978-0-88-141056-3.
- Hovorun, Cyril (2008). Will, Action and Freedom - Christological Controversies in the Seventh Century. Leiden-Boston: Brill Publishers. ISBN 978-9004166660.

Titles of Chalcedonian Christianity
Preceded by Sergius I	Ecumenical Patriarch of Constantinople; 638 – 641	Succeeded by Paul II
Preceded by Paul II	Ecumenical Patriarch of Constantinople; 654	Succeeded by Peter
