= Pope Boniface V =

Bishop of Rome from 619 to 625

- Bishop of Rome
- Church: Catholic Church
- Papacy began: 23 December 619
- Papacy ended: 25 October 625
- Predecessor: Adeodatus I
- Successor: Honorius I
- Previous post: Cardinal-Priest of San Sisto

Personal details
- Born: Naples, Italy, Byzantine Empire
- Died: 25 October 625 Rome, Italy, Byzantine Empire

Pope Boniface V (Latin: Bonifatius V; died 25 October 625) was the bishop of Rome from 23 December 619 to his death on 25 October 625. He did much for the Christianisation of Anglo-Saxon England, and enacted the decree by which churches became places of sanctuary.

== Election ==
Boniface came from Naples. His father's name was Ioannes or John. Nothing is known about his career before he became pope. He was elected to succeed Adeodatus I after the latter's death in November 618, but thirteen months of sede vacante ensued before the election was ratified by the imperial government in Constantinople. During that time, Italy was disturbed by the rebellion of the exarch of Ravenna, Eleutherius, who proclaimed himself emperor. Eleutherius advanced towards Rome, but before he reached the city, he was slain by his own troops. Boniface had been loyal to Emperor Heraclius, and his election was ratified on 23 December 619.

== Pontificate ==
Like Adeodatus I, Boniface V opposed Gregory I's pro-monastic policy. For that reason, he prescribed that acolytes should not presume to translate the relics of martyrs and that, in the Basilica of Saint John Lateran, they should not take the place of deacons in administering baptism. Boniface made certain enactments relative to the rights of sanctuary, and that he ordered the ecclesiastical notaries to obey the laws of the empire on the subject of wills. Boniface completed and consecrated the cemetery of Saint Nicomedes on the Via Nomentana. In the Liber Pontificalis, Boniface is described as "the mildest of men", whose chief distinction was his great love for the clergy.

Bede writes of the pope's affectionate concern for the English Church. The "letters of exhortation" which he is said to have addressed to Archbishop Mellitus of Canterbury and Bishop Justus of Rochester are no longer extant, but certain other letters of his have been preserved. One is written to Justus after he had succeeded Mellitus as archbishop of Canterbury in 624, conferring the pallium upon him and directing him to "ordain bishops as occasion should require." According to Bede, Pope Boniface also sent letters to King Edwin of Northumbria in 625 urging him to embrace the Christian faith, and to Edwin's Christian wife, Æthelburg of Kent, exhorting her to use her best endeavours for the conversion of her husband.

Boniface V was buried in St. Peter's Basilica on 25 October 625. He was succeeded by Honorius I.

== Notes ==
Catholic Church titles
Preceded by Adeodatus I	Pope; 619–625	Succeeded by Honorius I
