= Constantine I of Constantinople =

Ecumenical Patriarch of Constantinople from 675 to 677

- Ecumenical Patriarch of Constantinople
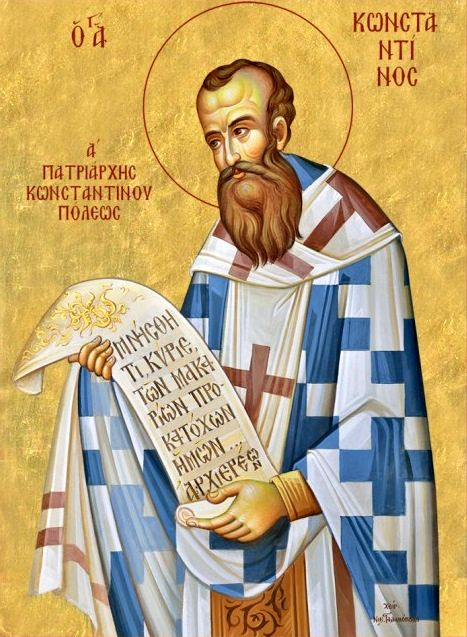
- Icon by Nicholas Galanopulos
- Installed: 2 September 675
- Term ended: 9 August 677
- Predecessor: John V of Constantinople
- Successor: Theodore I of Constantinople

Personal details
- Died: 9 August 677
- Denomination: Chalcedonian Christianity

Constantine I of Constantinople (Greek: Κωνσταντῖνος; died 9 August 677) was the Ecumenical Patriarch of Constantinople from 675 to 677. He is listed as a saint, feast day 29 July. He was preceded by John V of Constantinople. He was succeeded by Theodore I of Constantinople.

== Notes and references ==
Titles of Chalcedonian Christianity
Preceded by John V	Ecumenical Patriarch of Constantinople; 675 – 677	Succeeded by Theodore I
