= Eutychius of Constantinople =

Patriarch of Constantinople from 552 to 565 and from 577 to 582

Saint Eutychius of Constantinople
- Patriarch of Constantinople
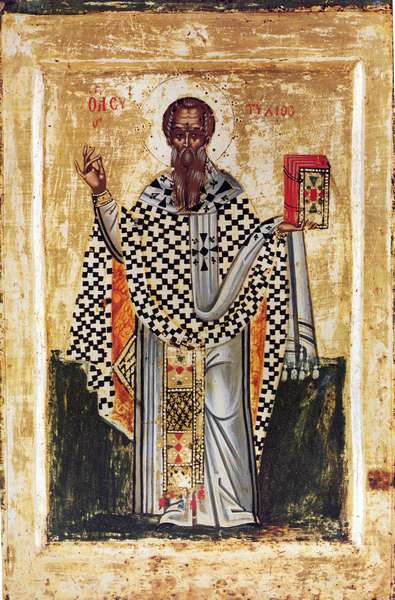
- Icon of Eutychius, 16th century
- Installed: August 552; 3 October 577
- Term ended: 22/31 January 565; 5 April 582
- Predecessor: Menas of Constantinople; John Scholasticus
- Successor: John Scholasticus; John IV of Constantinople

Personal details
- Born: c. 512 Theium, Phrygia, Diocese of Asia, Byzantine Empire (modern-day Anatolia, Turkey)
- Died: 5 April 582 Constantinople
- Denomination: Chalcedonian Christianity

Sainthood
- Feast day: 6 April
- Venerated in: Catholic Church, Eastern Orthodox Church
- Title as Saint: Holy Hierarch
- Shrines: San Giorgio Monastery

Eutychius of Constantinople (Greek: Εὐτύχιος, Eutychios; c. 512 – 5 April 582), considered a saint in the Catholic Church and Eastern Orthodox Christian traditions, was the patriarch of Constantinople from 552 to 565 and from 577 to 582. His feast is kept by the Orthodox Church on 6 April, and he is mentioned in the Catholic Church's "Corpus Juris". His terms of office, occurring during the reign of Emperor Justinian I, were marked by controversies with both imperial and papal authority.

== Early life ==
Eutychius' career is well documented: a full biography, composed by his chaplain Eustathius of Constantinople, was preserved intact. Eutychius was born at Theium in Phrygia. His father, Alexander, was a general under the famous Byzantine commander Belisarius. Eutychius became a monk at Amasea at the age of 30. As an archimandrite at Constantinople, Eutychius was well respected by Menas of Constantinople, the Patriarch of Constantinople. Eventually, on the day Menas died, Eutychius was nominated by Emperor Justinian I as Patriarch.

== First patriarchate ==
Pope Vigilius was in Constantinople when Eutychius became patriarch. Eutychius sent him the usual announcement of his own appointment and a completely orthodox profession of the then-united Church. At the same time, the Pope urged him to summon and preside over the Church Council summoned to deal with the Three-Chapter Controversy. Vigilius first gave, and then withdrew, his consent to the Council. In spite of the Pope's refusal, the council met on 5 May 553 at Constantinople, and Eutychius shared the first place in the assembly with Patriarch Apollinarius of Alexandria and Domnus of Antioch (called "Domnus III", see List of Greek Orthodox Patriarchs of Antioch). At the second session, the pope excused himself again on the grounds of ill health. The subscription of Eutychius to the Acts of this synod, which was later recognized as the Second Council of Constantinople and which concluded on 2 June 553, is a summary of the decrees against the Three Chapters.

Eutychius had, so far, stood by the Emperor throughout. He composed the decree of the Council against The Three Chapters. In 562, he consecrated the new church of Hagia Sophia. However, Eutychius came into violent collision with Justinian I in 564, when the Emperor adopted the tenets of the Aphthartodocetae, a sect of Non-Chalcedonians who believed that Christ's body on earth was incorruptible ('aphthorá) and subject to no pain.

Eutychius, in a long address, argued the incompatibility of the Aphthartodocetic beliefs with Scripture. Emperor Justinian I insisted that he subscribe to it anyway. When Eutychius refused to compromise, Justinian I ordered his arrest. On 22 January 565, Eutychius was celebrating the feast day of Saint Timothy in the church adjoining the Hormisdas Palace when soldiers broke into the patriarchal residence, entered the church, and carried him away.

== Arrest and exile ==
Eutychius was first removed to a monastery called Choracudis, and the next day to the monastery of St. Osias near Chalcedon. Eight days later Justinian called an assembly of princes and prelates, to which he summoned Eutychius. The charges against him were trivial: that he used ointments, ate "delicate meats", and prayed for long periods. After being summoned three times, Eutychius replied that he would only come if he were to be judged canonically, in his own dignity, and in command of his clergy. Condemned by default, he was sent to an island in the Propontis named Principus ("Princes' Islands"), and later to his old monastery at Amasea, where he spent 12 years and 5 months.

== Return and second patriarchate ==
Upon the death of John Scholasticus, whom Justinian I had put in the patriarchal chair, the people of Constantinople demanded the return of Eutychius. Emperor Justin II had succeeded Justinian I in 565 and had associated with himself the young Tiberius II Constantine, who was made Caesar in 574. In October 577 the two emperors sent a delegation to Amasea to bring Eutychius back to Constantinople. Contemporary reports claim that as he entered the city, a large group of people met him, shouting aloud, "Blessed is he that cometh in the name of the Lord," and "Glory to God in the highest, on earth peace". In imitation of the entrance of Jesus into Jerusalem (recorded in Matthew 21:1–11 and John 12:12–18), he entered the city on an ass's colt, over garments spread on the ground, the crowd carrying palms, dancing, and singing. The whole city was illuminated, public banquets were held, and new buildings were inaugurated.

The next day he met with the two emperors and was given "conspicuous honor" at the Church of the Virgin in Blachernae. He then proceeded to Hagia Sophia, mounted the pulpit, and blessed the many people. It took him six hours to distribute the communion because all of the people wished to receive it from his own hands.

== Late beliefs and death ==
Toward the end of his life, Eutychius maintained an opinion that after the resurrection the body will be "more subtle than air" and no longer a tangible thing. This was considered heretical because it was taken as a denial of the doctrine of physical, corporeal resurrection. The future Pope Gregory I, then residing at Constantinople as Apocrisiarius, opposed this opinion, citing Luke 24:39. Emperor Tiberius II Constantine talked to the disputants separately and tried to reconcile them, but the breach was persistent.

Eutychius died quietly on the Sunday after Easter, at the age of 70. Some of his friends later told Pope Gregory I that a few minutes before his death he touched the skin of his hand and said, "I confess that in this flesh we shall rise again" (a rough quote of Job 19:26).

Among his pupils was Eustratius of Constantinople who wrote a tract against soul sleep.

== Extant works by Eutychius ==
His literary remains are:

- Letter to Pope Vigilius (Jacques Paul Migne, Patrologia Latina, LXIX, 63, Patrologia Latina, LXXXVI, 2401);
- "Discourse on Easter" (fragment), (Mai: Class. Auct. X, 488, and Script. Vet. Nov Coll. IX, 623); and other fragments found in P.G., LXXXVI.

== Notes and references ==
=== Attribution ===
Titles of Chalcedonian Christianity
| Preceded by Menas | Patriarch of Constantinople; 552 – 565 | Succeeded by John Scholasticus |
| Preceded by John Scholasticus | Patriarch of Constantinople; 577 – 582 | Succeeded by John IV |
