= Paul III of Constantinople =

Ecumenical Patriarch of Constantinople from 688 to 693

- Ecumenical Patriarch of Constantinople
- Installed: January 688
- Term ended: 20 August 693
- Predecessor: Theodore I of Constantinople
- Successor: Callinicus I of Constantinople

Personal details
- Died: 20 August 693
- Denomination: Chalcedonian Christianity

Paul III of Constantinople (Greek: Παῦλος; died 20 August 693) was the Ecumenical Patriarch of Constantinople from 688 to 693.

== Notes and references ==
Titles of Chalcedonian Christianity
Preceded by Theodore I	Ecumenical Patriarch of Constantinople; 688 – 693	Succeeded by Callinicus I
