= Paul II of Constantinople =

Ecumenical Patriarch of Constantinople from 641 to 653

- Ecumenical Patriarch of Constantinople
- Installed: 1 October 641
- Term ended: 27 December 653
- Predecessor: Pyrrhus of Constantinople
- Successor: Pyrrhus of Constantinople

Personal details
- Died: 27 December 653
- Denomination: Chalcedonian Christianity

Paul II of Constantinople (Greek: Παῦλος; died 27 December 653) was the Ecumenical Patriarch of Constantinople from 1 October 641 to his death. He assumed regency for Byzantine emperor Constans II after a succession crisis in 641. Stephanos of Clypea (now Kelibia, in Tunisia) appears to have served as secretary/scribe of Patriarch Paul II of Constantinople (641–653) against the Monothelites, in 646. He was succeeded by Peter of Constantinople.

Paul II was elevated at the accession of the Byzantine emperor Constans II, who succeeded Heraclius Constantine, and just shortly before the pontificate of Pope Theodore I. Paul II became patriarch at a time when monophysitism was fragmenting the Byzantine Church. At first, he declared his adherence to Orthodox Christology, then (646–647) accepted the compromise position of monothelitism put forward by his predecessors, Patriarchs Sergius I of Constantinople and Pyrrhus of Constantinople. In 648 he backed with his authority the decree of Constans II, known as the typos, which simply forbade all further discussion of the Christological question. Then in 649, along with Sergius I and Pyrrhus, he was excommunicated and anathematised by the Lateran Synod called by Pope Martin I. This action, coupled with the fact that Martin I's elevation had taken place without imperial sanction, resulted in the Emperor's seizing the Pope and exiling him to the Chersonesus in 653, the year of Paul II's death. Imperial attempts to solve the Monophysite controversy, either by compromise or enforced silence, lost their urgency by the end of Paul II's tenure; by that time Arab conquests had overrun the most strongly Monophysitic provinces of the Byzantine Empire. The Monothelite compromise was abjured by the Byzantine Church itself at the Third Council of Constantinople (680–681), which declared Paul II, among others, heretical.

== Notes and references ==
Titles of Chalcedonian Christianity
Preceded by Pyrrhus	Ecumenical Patriarch of Constantinople; 641 – 653	Succeeded by Pyrrhus (2)
