= George I of Constantinople =

Ecumenical Patriarch of Constantinople from 679 to 686

Saint George I of Constantinople
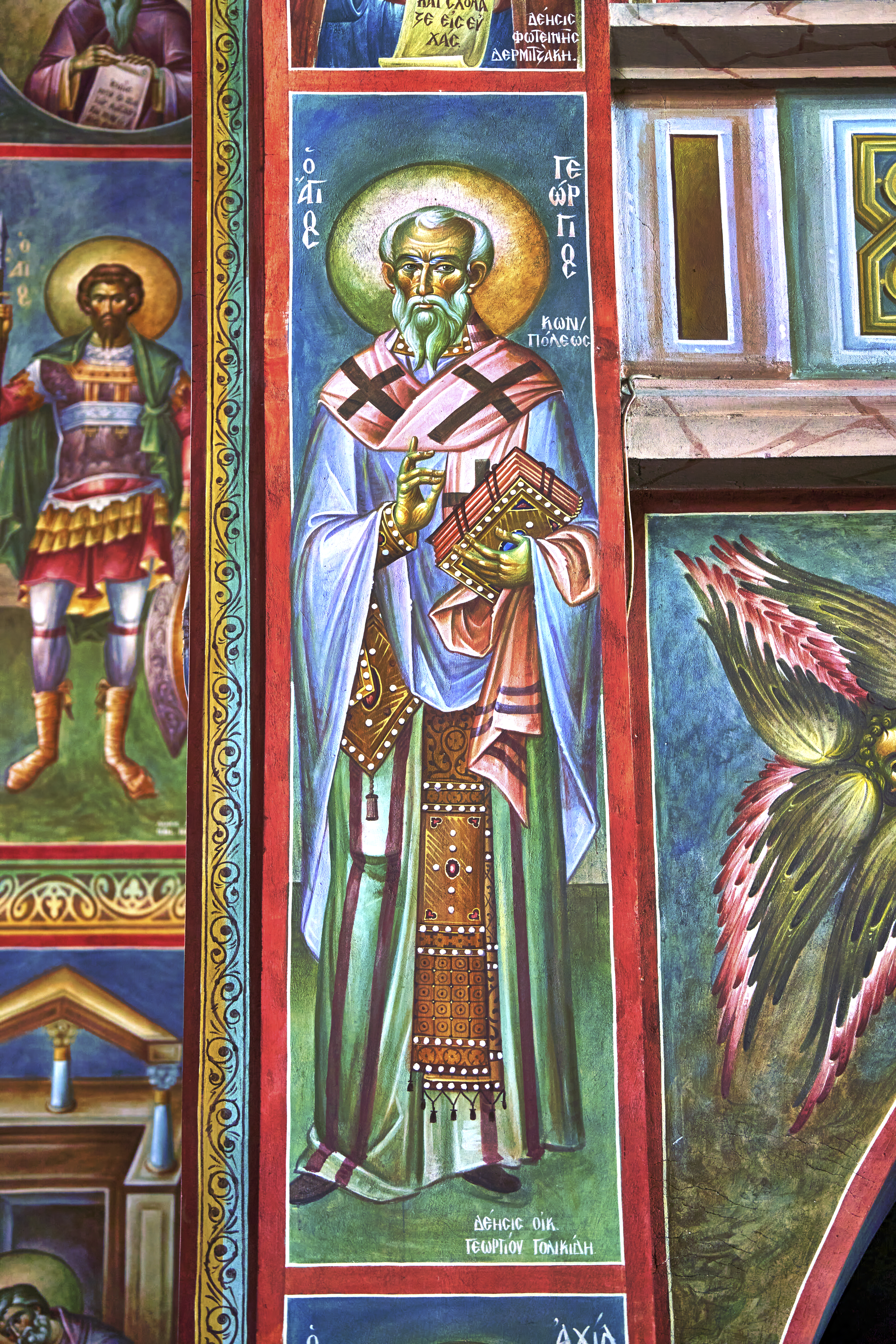
- Mural depicting Saint George of Constantinople in the Church of the Holy Trinity – Kerameikos

Ecumenical Patriarch of Constantinople
- Died: January or February 686; Constantinople (modern-day Istanbul, Turkey)
- Venerated in: Eastern Orthodox Church
- Feast: 18 August

George I of Constantinople
- Ecumenical Patriarch of Constantinople
- Installed: c. November 679
- Term ended: January 686
- Predecessor: Theodore I of Constantinople
- Successor: Theodore I of Constantinople

Personal details
- Denomination: Chalcedonian Christianity

George I of Constantinople (Greek: Γεώργιος; died January or February 686) was the Ecumenical Patriarch of Constantinople from 679 to 686. He was succeeded, after a one-year bishopric and interlude of a reign by patriarch Theodore I of Constantinople.

George I is commemorated in the Eastern Orthodox Church as a saint, with his feast day being 18 August.

== Notes and references ==
Titles of Chalcedonian Christianity
Preceded by Theodore I	Patriarch of Constantinople; 679 – 686	Succeeded by Theodore I (2)
