= Theodore I of Constantinople =

Ecumenical Patriarch of Constantinople from 677 to 679 and from 686 to 687

- Ecumenical Patriarch of Constantinople
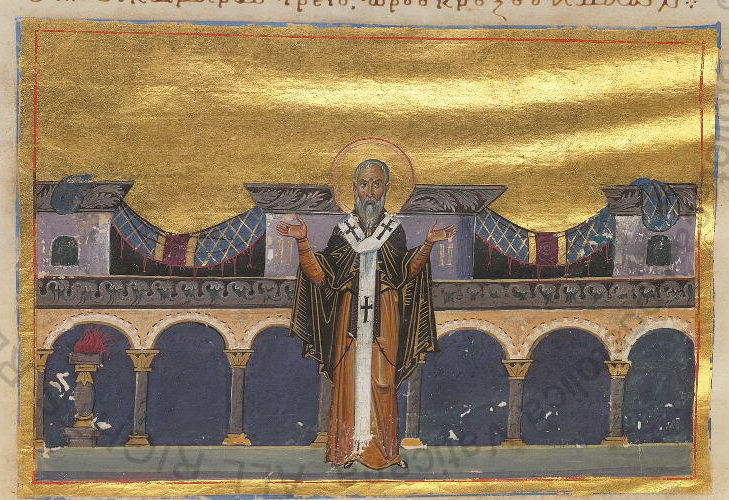
- Installed: August 677 c. January 686
- Term ended: November 679; 28 December 687
- Predecessor: Constantine I of Constantinople; George I of Constantinople
- Successor: George I of Constantinople; Paul III of Constantinople

Personal details
- Died: 28 December 687
- Denomination: Chalcedonian Christianity

Theodore I of Constantinople (Greek: Θεόδωρος; died 28 December 687) was the Ecumenical Patriarch of Constantinople from 677 to 679. He had been preceded by Constantine I of Constantinople. During this cataclysmic period, the Byzantine military overcame the Arab incursion against its walls in the Arab siege of Constantinople (674-678). He was succeeded by Patriarch George I of Constantinople.

== Notes and references ==
Titles of Chalcedonian Christianity
Preceded by Constantine I	Ecumenical Patriarch of Constantinople; 677 – 679	Succeeded by George I
Preceded by George I	Ecumenical Patriarch of Constantinople; 686 – 687	Succeeded by Paul III
