= John IV of Constantinople =

Ecumenical Patriarch of Constantinople from 582 to 595

Saint John IV of Constantinople
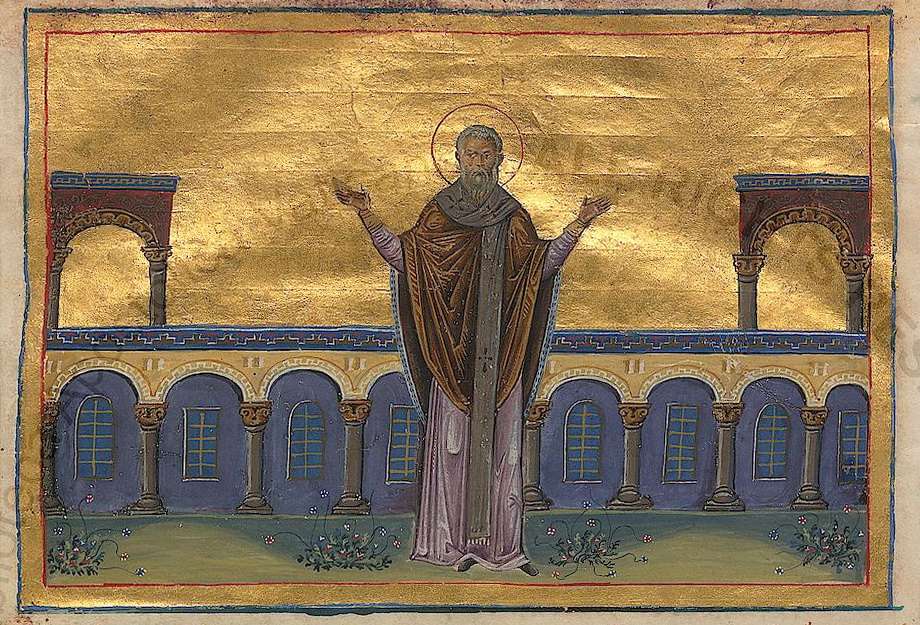
- Born: Constantinople
- Died: 2 September 595; Constantinople
- Venerated in: Eastern Orthodox Church
- Feast: 2 September

John IV of Constantinople
- Ecumenical Patriarch of Constantinople
- Installed: 12 April 582
- Term ended: 2 September 595
- Predecessor: Eutychius of Constantinople
- Successor: Cyriacus II of Constantinople

Personal details
- Died: 2 September 595
- Denomination: Chalcedonian Christianity

John IV of Constantinople (died 2 September 595), also known as John Nesteutes (Greek: Ἰωάννης Νηστευτής, Ioannes the Faster), was patriarch of Constantinople (12 April 582 – 2 September 595). He was the first to assume the title Ecumenical Patriarch. He is regarded as a saint by the Eastern Orthodox Church which holds a feast on 2 September.

== Life ==
John IV (surnamed Jejunator, sometimes also Cappadox) was born at Constantinople of artisan parents, and worked as a goldsmith. Under the Patriarch John Scholasticus (565–577) he was deacon at the Hagia Sophia church; then he became sakellarios (an official who acts as patriarchal vicar for monasteries). He was famous for his ascetical life and called "the Faster". Under Eutychius of Constantinople (552–565 and 577–582) he became an important person among the clergy of the city. At Eutychius's death he was made patriarch by the Emperor Tiberius II Constantine (574–582).

According to one account, a horse show was scheduled in the Hippodrome on eve of the Feast of Pentecost. Patriarch John IV found his flock's attendance unacceptable. Through the patriarch's fervent prayer, a terrible thunderstorm arose with rain and hailstones so that everyone dispersed in fear and came to realize the inappropriateness of such entertainment.

Under the next emperor, Maurice (582–602), he was still a favourite at court. He had always a great reputation for asceticism and charity to the poor. In 587 or 588, he summoned the bishops of the East in the name of the "Ecumenical Patriarch" to examine certain charges against Gregory of Antioch, Patriarch of Antioch, (although Fortescue questions on what authority).

Patriarch Gregory was acquitted and returned to his episcopal see. A report was sent to Rome and Pope Pelagius II solemnly annulled the acts of this council. In 590 Pope Pelagius II was succeeded by Pope Gregory I, who was initially on good terms with John IV, whom he had known when Gregory I served as legate at Constantinople.

In 593, John IV was severely blamed by Pope Gregory I for having allowed an Isaurian presbyter named Anastasius, who had been accused of heresy, to be beaten with ropes in the church of Constantinople.

In 595, the controversy was again rife about the title of Ecumenical Patriarch. Gregory wrote to his legate Sabinianus forbidding him to communicate with John IV. In the case of a presbyter named Athanasius, accused of being to some extent a Manichaean, and condemned as such, Gregory I tried to show that the accuser was himself a Pelagian, and that by the carelessness, ignorance, or fault of John IV, the Nestorian council of Ephesus had actually been mistaken for the Orthodox Council of Ephesus.

== Works ==
Isidore of Seville (de Script. Eccl. 26) attributes to him only a letter, not now extant, on baptism addressed to St. Leander, John IV, he says "propounds nothing of his own, but only repeats the opinions of the ancient Fathers on trine immersion". There are, however, several works attributed to John IV still extant (edited in Patrologia Graeca, vol. 88):

- His Penitential, Libellus Poenitentialis, or, as it is described in Book III of the work of Leo Allatius, de Consensu Utriusque Ecclesiae (Rome, 1655, quarto), Praxis Graecis Praescripta in Confessione Peragenda;
- Instructio, qua non modo confitens de confessione pie et integre edenda instituitur, sed etiam sacerdos, qua ratione confessiones excipiat, poenitentiam imponat et reconciliationem praestet informatur;
- Homily on penitence, continence, and virginity. It is often printed among John Chrysostom's homilies but now agreed not to be Chrysostom's. Bernard de Montfaucon, Isaac Vossius, and Pearson held it to be by John IV; Morel and Savile printed it among Chrysostom's works;
- Homily on False Prophets and False Doctrine. It is attributed occasionally to Chrysostom, by Peter Wastel to John of Jerusalem, but by Isaac Vossius, Petavius, and Cave to John IV;
- A set of Precepts to a Monk, in a manuscript at the Paris library.

The Orthodox in the Middle Ages always attributed the first two of these to the Patriarch.

== Notes and references ==
=== Attribution ===
- .
- cites:
  - Jacques Paul Migne reproduces the Penitential, the Instructions for Confession, and the Homily on Penitence in Patrologia Graeca, lxxxviii, 1089;
  - Caesar Baronius, ad. ann., 588–593;
  - Acta Sanctorum (Bollandist), 1 August, p. 69;
  - Fleury, ii, bk. xxxiv, c. 44;
  - Rémy Ceillier, xi, 427;
  - Johann Albert Fabricius, Bibl. Graec., xi, 108; xii, 239;
  - Dokos, G., Exomologetarion – A Manual of Confessions by our Righteous God-bearing Father Nikodemos the Hagiorite, 2006, Thessalonica, Uncut Mountain Press;
  - Agapius and Nicodemus, The Rudder (Pedalion) – All the Sacred and Divine Canons, 1957, The Orthodox Christian Educational Society, Chicago;

Titles of Chalcedonian Christianity
| Preceded by Eutychius | Ecumenical patriarch of Constantinople; 582 – 595 | Succeeded by Cyriacus II |
