= Apocrisiarius =

Historical diplomatic position

An apocrisiarius, the Latinized form of apokrisiarios (Greek: ἀποκρισιάριος), sometimes Anglicized as apocrisiary, was a high diplomatic representative during Late Antiquity and the early Middle Ages. The corresponding (purist) Latin term was responsalis ("he who answers"). The title was used by Byzantine ambassadors, as well as by the representatives of bishops to the secular authorities. The closest modern equivalent is a papal nuncio; the title apocrisiarius is also still employed by the Anglican Church.

== Byzantine apocrisiarii ==
An apocrisiarius was a cleric who served as the representative (also described as legate, a less precise term) of a patriarch or other bishop to the Byzantine imperial court of Constantinople. The office existed since the 5th century, but was institutionalized by law only under Emperor Justinian I (r. 527–565). Several of the more important ecclesiastical sees maintained permanent apocrisiarii in the imperial capital. The most important of these were the papal apocrisiarii (circa 452 till 743). The title was also used for the representative of a metropolitan archbishop at the court of his "territorial" patriarch in either Constantinople, Alexandria, Antioch, or Jerusalem and for secular officials carrying correspondence of the Byzantine emperor.

== Frankish apocrisiarii ==
From the reign of Charlemagne (r. 768–814), the court of the Frankish king/emperor had clerical members styled apocrisiarii. However, they were only royal archchaplains decorated with the title of the ancient papal envoys, since they did not perform any diplomatic duties.

== Anglican Church ==
In the modern Anglican Communion, representatives of the Archbishop of Canterbury to various churches are styled apocrisiarioi.
