= Cyriacus II of Constantinople =

Ecumenical Patriarch of Constantinople from 596 to 606

- Ecumenical Patriarch of Constantinople
- Installed: c. February 596
- Term ended: 29 October 606
- Predecessor: John IV of Constantinople
- Successor: Thomas I of Constantinople

Personal details
- Died: 29 October 606
- Denomination: Chalcedonian Christianity

Cyriacus II of Constantinople (Greek: Κυριακός; died 29 October 606) was Ecumenical Patriarch of Constantinople (596–606).

He was previously presbyter and steward, oikonomos, of the great church at Constantinople (Chronicon Paschale, p. 378). Pope Gregory I received the legates bearing the synodal letters which announced his consecration, partly from a desire not to disturb the peace of the church, and partly from the personal respect which he entertained for Cyriacus II; but in his reply he warned him against the sin of causing divisions in the church, clearly alluding to the use of the term oecumenical bishop, which Gregory I interpreted as meaning "universal" or even "exclusive" bishop (Gregory I, Ep. lib., vii, 4, Patrologia Latina, lxxvii, 853). The personal feelings of Gregory I towards Cyriacus II appear most friendly.

Cyriacus II did not attend to Gregory I's entreaties that he abstain from using the title, for Gregory I wrote afterwards both to him and to the Emperor Maurice, declaring that he could not allow his legates to remain in communion with Cyriacus II as long as he retained it. In the latter of these letters, he compares the assumption of the title to the sin of Antichrist, since both exhibit a spirit of lawless pride. "Quisquis se universalem sacerdotem vocat, vel vocari desiderat, in elatione sua Antichristum praecurrit" (whosoever calls himself universal priest, or desires to be called so, is the forerunner of the Antichrist) (Gregory I, Ep. 28, 30). In a letter to Anastasius I of Antioch, who had written to him to remonstrate against disturbing the peace of the church, Gregory defends his conduct on the ground of the injury which Cyriac had done to all other patriarchs by the assumption of the title and reminds Anastasius I that not only heretics but heresiarchs had before this been patriarchs of Constantinople. He also deprecates the use of the term on more general grounds (Ep. 24). In spite of all this Cyriacus II was firm in his retention of the title, and appears to have summoned, or to have meditated summoning, a council to authorise its use. For in 599, Gregory wrote to Eusebius of Thessalonica and some other bishops, stating that he had heard they were about to be summoned to a council at Constantinople, and most urgently entreating them to yield neither to force nor to persuasion, but to be steadfast in their refusal to recognize the offensive title (ib. lib. ix, 68 in Patrologia Latina).

Cyriacus II appears to have shared in that unpopularity of the emperor Maurice which caused the latter's deposition and death (Theophanes the Confessor, Chronicle, A. M. 6094; Niceph. Callis., H. E., xviii, 40; Theophylact. Hist. viii, 9). He still, however, had influence enough to exact from Emperor Phocas at his coronation a confession of the orthodox faith and a pledge not to disturb the church (Theophanes Chronicle, A. M. 6094). He also nobly resisted the attempt of Phocas to drag the empress Constantina and her daughters from their sanctuary in a church of Constantinople (ibid., A. M. 6098).

Perhaps some resentment at this opposition to his will may have induced Phocas to accede more readily to the claims of Pope Boniface III that Rome should be considered to be the head of all the church, in exclusion of the claims of Constantinople to the oecumenical bishopric (Vita Bonifacii III, in Philippe Labbe, Acta Concil, t. v. 1615).

Cyriacus II died in 606 and was interred in the church of the Holy Apostles (Chronicon Paschale, p. 381). He appears to have been a man of remarkable piety and earnestness, able to win the esteem of all parties. He built a church dedicated to the theotokos in a street of Constantinople called Diaconissa (Theophanes Chronicle, A. M. 6090; Niceph. Callis., H. E., xviii, 42).

== Notes and references ==
=== Attribution ===
Titles of Chalcedonian Christianity
Preceded by John IV	Ecumenical Patriarch of Constantinople; 596 – 606	Succeeded by Thomas I
