= Thomas I of Constantinople =

Ecumenical Patriarch of Constantinople from 607 610

- Ecumenical Patriarch of Constantinople
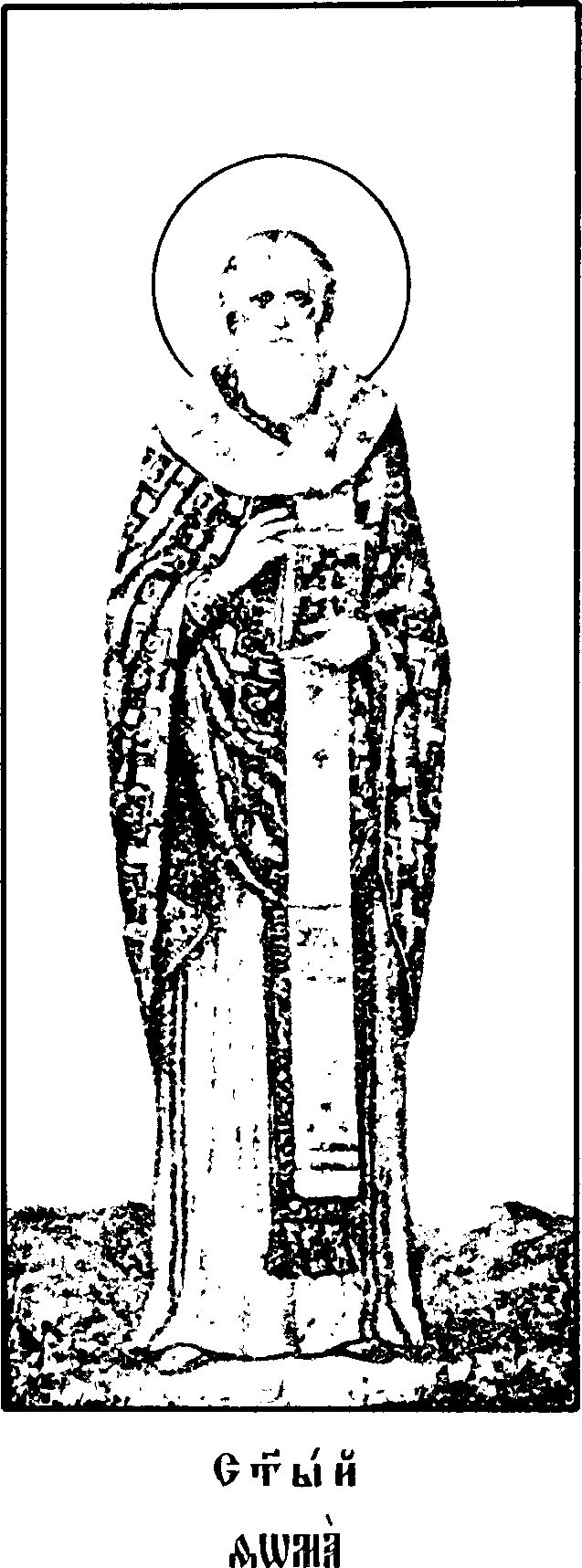
- Installed: 23 January 607
- Term ended: 21 March 610
- Predecessor: Cyriacus II of Constantinople
- Successor: Sergius I of Constantinople

Personal details
- Died: 21 March 610
- Denomination: Chalcedonian Christianity

Sainthood
- Feast day: 3 April (21 March)

Thomas I of Constantinople (Greek: Θωμᾶς; died 21 March 610) was the Ecumenical Patriarch of Constantinople from 607 to 610. He has been canonised a saint in the Eastern Orthodox Church. His feast day is 21 March for those churches which follow the Julian Calendar, 21 March falls on 3 April of the modern Gregorian Calendar).

== Notes and references ==
Titles of Chalcedonian Christianity
Preceded by Cyriacus II	Ecumenical Patriarch of Constantinople; 607 – 610	Succeeded by Sergius I
