= Thomas II of Constantinople =

Ecumenical Patriarch of Constantinople from 667 to 669

- Ecumenical Patriarch of Constantinople
- Installed: 17 April 667
- Term ended: 15 November 669
- Predecessor: Peter of Constantinople
- Successor: John V of Constantinople

Personal details
- Died: 15 November 669
- Denomination: Chalcedonian Christianity

Thomas II of Constantinople (Greek: Θωμᾶς; died 15 November 669) was the Ecumenical Patriarch of Constantinople from 17 April 667 to 669. He had been ecumenically preceded by Patriarch Peter of Constantinople. During the troubled times of the Christological disputes, he was Orthodox in his faith and teaching. He is commemorated by the Church on 16 November. He was succeeded as Ecumenical Patriarch by John V of Constantinople.

== Life ==
Little is known of his life. Thomas II was in the service of the patriarchate in which he served as a scribe, a refendarius, a chancellor of the Patriarchate, and director of the Scala Gerokoeion and the Neapolis Ptochotropheion. Thomas II was elected patriarch from the diaconate over six and a half months after the repose of his predecessor, Patriarch Peter of Constantinople. His consecration has been dated as on Holy Saturday in the year 665.

The length of his rule as patriarch is uncertain, as sources differ as to its length. The sources vary from two years and seven months according to Nicephoros, to three years by Theophanes the Confessor, to four years and seven months on Leoglavious' list. Patriarch Thomas II reposed in 668 or 669.

== Bibliography ==
This article incorporates text from Thomas II of Constantinople at OrthodoxWiki which is licensed under the CC-BY-SA and GFDL.

Titles of Chalcedonian Christianity
Preceded by Peter	Ecumenical Patriarch of Constantinople; 667 – 669	Succeeded by John V
