= Theodore (prefect of Egypt) =

Prefect of Egypt

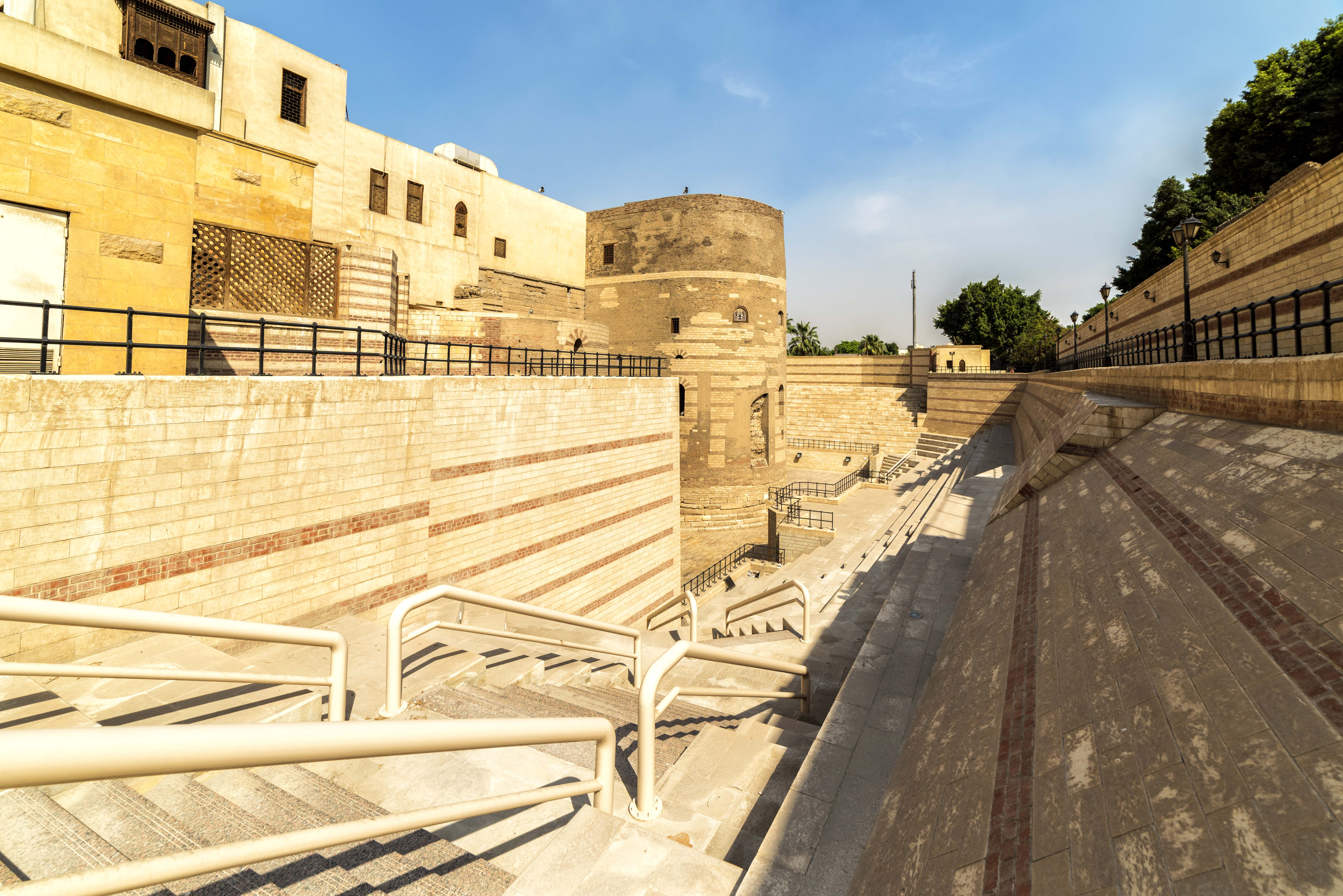
- Interior of the Babylon Fortress, which Theodore defended

dux et augustalis Alexandriae
- In office 14 September 641 – 17 September 642

Theodore (Latin: Theodorus, Greek: Θεόδωρος; fl. 7th century) was a Byzantine military commander who led the Byzantine army in the defence of Egypt during the Arab conquest, and served as the last Roman governor of Egypt from 14 September 641 to 17 September 642.

== Biography ==
John of Nikiû mentions that Theodore had family members living in Saûnâ, which Hermann Zotenberg identifies with Sais. He was a Chalcedonian, but not prejudiced against non-Chalcedonians, as shown by his willingness to place them in important positions.

=== Siege of Babylon Fortress ===
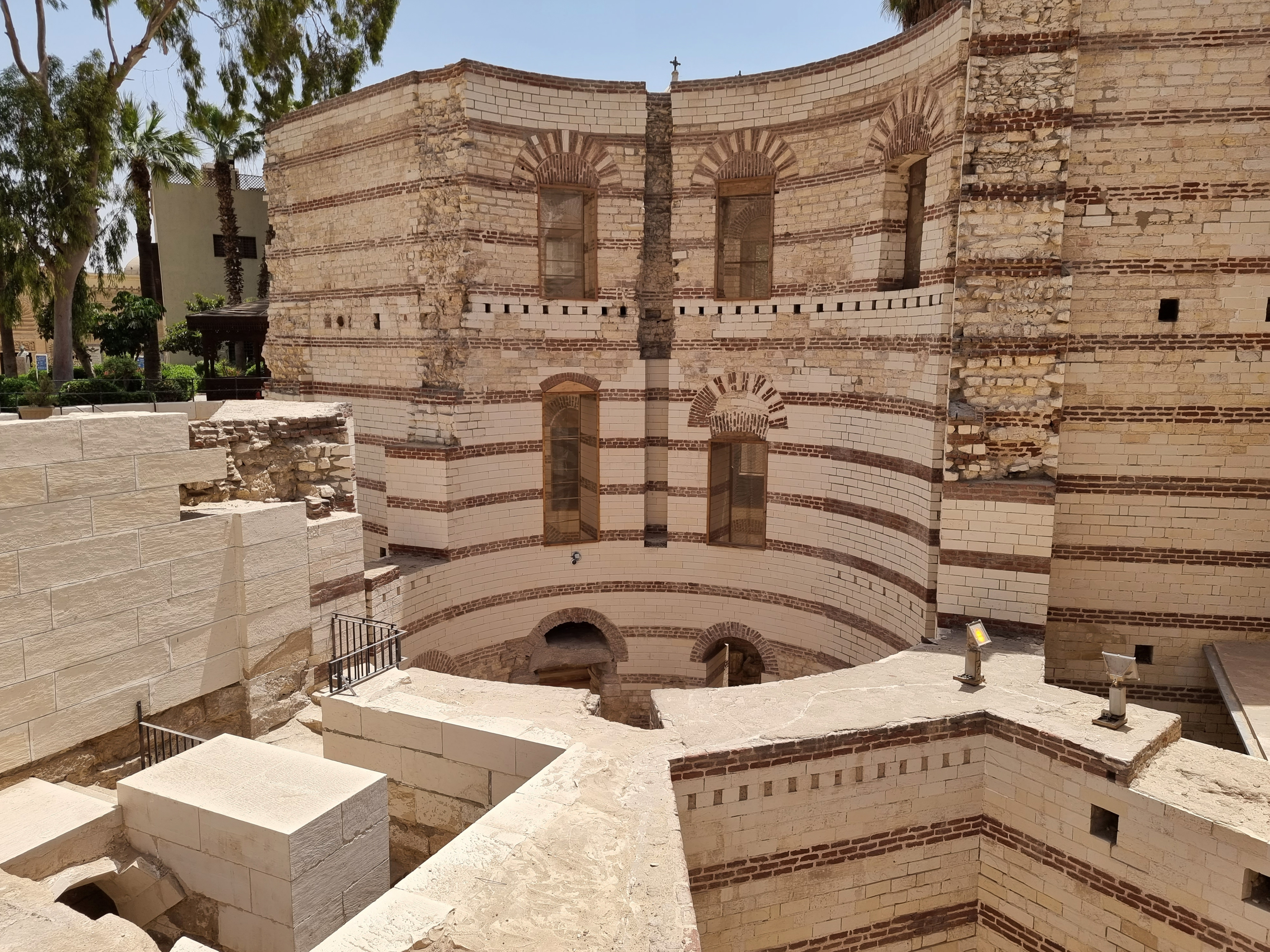
Remains of the Babylon Fortress in Old Cairo

When the Arab armies of the Rashidun caliphate, commanded by Amr ibn al-As, began their invasion of Egypt in December 639, Theodore was the magister militum of the Byzantine army in the province, while Cyrus of Alexandria was both its de facto governor and the government-appointed Patriarch of Alexandria, (Note: The majority of Egypt's population was non-Chalcedonian and instead recognised Pope Benjamin I as their rightful Pope.) and Heraclius was the Roman emperor. Theodore was late to react to the Arabs, only doing so after the two-month long siege of Pelusium was over in February 640. After this, however, Theodore and Cyrus rushed to the Babylon Fortress, sent scouts to Bilbeis to hinder the Arabs' advance, and had the Babylon Fortress fortified. Outside the city, a ditch had been dug, and a large force was positioned in the area between the ditch and the city walls. The Muslims besieged the fort, a massive structure 18 m (59 ft) high with walls more than 2 metres (6.6 feet) thick and studded with numerous towers and bastions and a force of some 4,000 men. Early Muslim sources place the strength of the Byzantine force in Babylon at about six times the strength of the Muslim force. For the next two months, fighting remained inconclusive, with the Byzantines repulsing every Muslim assault.

Realising that Babylon was too strong to take, 'Amr sent a detachment to raid the city of Faiyum. The Byzantines had anticipated that and so had strongly guarded the roads that led to the city and had fortified their garrison in the nearby town of Lahun. At this time, the governor of Faiyum was Domentianus (who was also married to Cyrus' sister), while Theodosius was the prefect of its province, Arcadia Aegypti, and Anastasius was the prefect of Alexandria. The defence of Arcadia Aegypti was entrusted to a certain John, whom Hermann Zotenberg identifies with the John, Duke of Barca or Barcaina mentioned by Nicephorus. (Note: According to Nicephorus, "While Heraclius was still in the East, he sent John, Duke of Barcaina, against the Saracens in Egypt. He joined battle with them and was himself killed.") He had brought the Ecthesis and a portion of the True Cross from Patriarch Sergius to Cyrus, and was likely on a direct commission from Emperor Heraclius.

When the Muslims saw that Faiyum was also too well guarded, they headed towards the Western Desert, where they looted as many cattle and animals as they could. They subsequently headed to a town in the Faiyum district named Bahnasa (not to be confused with Oxyrhynchus 50 miles further south), which was defeated and the city was captured. According to John of Nikiû, "they compelled the city to open its gates, and they put to the sword all that surrendered, and they spared none, whether old men, babe, or woman." The Arabs then noticed that John, with a small group of 50 men, had been following them. John and his men retreated to their base at Abûît, but their hiding place was betrayed by a Bedouin chief and they were all killed.

When news of John's death reached Theodore, 'his lamentations were more grievous than the lamentations of David over Saul when he said: "How are the mighty fallen, and the weapons of war perished!"' as John of Nikiu puts it. (Note: 2 Samuel 1:27) Theodore hurried his troops up the Nile while Anastasius and Theodosius rushed from Nikiû to Babylon to strengthen it, while a further force was sent from Babylon to Abûît to strengthen it under Leontius, who was "obese in person, quite without energy and unacquainted with warlike affairs". When he arrived, he found Theodore and his troops there already making sorties every day against the Arab base at Bahnasa. Judging that Amr would soon be defeated, Leontius left only half of his men there, going back to Babylon with the other half.

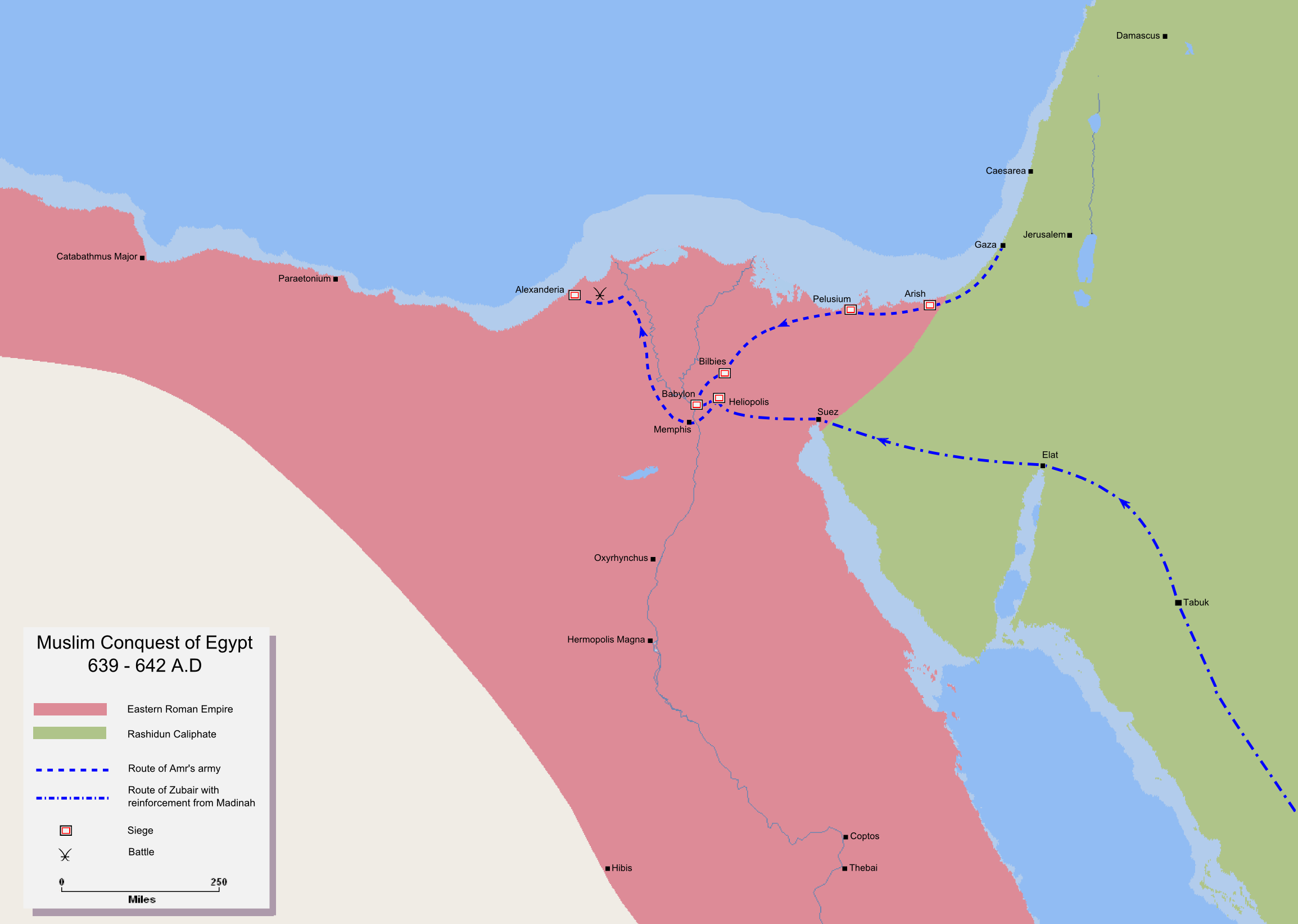
Map detailing the route of the Muslims' invasion of Egypt

The Arabs eventually gave up on attempting to take Faiyum and returned northwards. Theodore gave orders for the body of John, which had been thrown in the Nile, to be found. It was retrieved with a net, embalmed with honour and sent back to Heraclius. As Theodore was commander-in-chief, Heraclius blamed him for John's death. Feeling that he was blamed due to negative reports from Theodosius and Anastasius, Theodore formed an enmity with them.

=== Battle of Heliopolis ===
In June, about 12,000 Muslim troops arrived to reinforce Amr, commanded by Zubayr ibn al-Awwam. When Zubayr arrived, he pointed out to ‘Amr that the Roman-garrisoned city of Heliopolis was a short distance away, and that troops from there could relieve the Siege of Babylon. To remove this threat, ‘Amr went with about half of his men there. Theodore moved his forces to Heliopolis, about 15 km (10 mi) from Babylon, with Anastasius and Theodosius in charge of the cavalry. 'Amr gave the following order: "Be on the watch, so that when the Roman troops come out to attack us, you may rise up in their rear, whilst we shall be on their front, and so having got them between us, we shall put them to the sword." The Byzantines, unaware of this plan, were surrounded and massacred. The Roman garrison at Tendunias (located at Azbakeya according to Butler), was seized when Zubayr and some of his handpicked soldiers scaled the Heliopolis city wall at an unguarded point and, after overpowering the guards, opened the gates for the army to enter the city. Of the Byzantine soldiers there, only 300 survived. These retreated to the fortress at Babylon. Some of them, hearing of the slaughter of the Byzantine Army, were terrified and fled further to Nikiû by boat. Theodore, Theodosius and Anastasius were among the survivors.

When Domentianus, governor of Faiyum heard of the defeat, he left his camp at Abûît and fled to Nikiû without even informing the locals that he was abandoning them to the Muslims. When news reached 'Amr, he sent troops across the Nile to invade Fayoum and Abuit, capturing the entire province of Fayoum with practically no resistance. Fayoum's population was enslaved, and the city was looted (the traditional fate of cities that had resisted). 'Amr then directed his troops to Delas, where he forced Apa Cyrus, pagarch of Heracleopolis Magna, to supply him and his army with boats to travel along the Nile. He also made George, the prefect of the province around Babylon, build bridges for him at Qalyub, Athribis, Menouf and Babylon. John of Nikiu continues "Not content with that, 'Amr had the Roman magistrates arrested and their hands and feet fettered with chains or logs of wood: he extorted great sums of money, laid a double tax on the peasants, whom he forced to bring forage for his horses, and he committed innumerable acts of violence." Many Egyptians and even Byzantine commanders in Nikiu fled to Alexandria, leaving Domentianus and a small garrison to defend Nikiu.

=== Fall of Babylon Fortress ===
Meanwhile, Theodore and Cyrus were still defending Babylon from the besieging Arabs. Theodore shifted his headquarters to the island of Rauda, which was connected to the fortress. He and 'Amr exchanged emissaries and even met in person. Then, with negotiations stalled, during the night of 20 December, a company of handpicked warriors, led by Zubayr, managed to scale the wall, kill the guards, and open the gates for the Muslim army to enter. The city was captured by the Muslims the following morning with tactics similar to those that had been used by Khalid ibn Walid at Damascus. However, Theodore and his army managed to slip away to Rauda during the night, whence they continued to fight the Muslims.

During this time, Theodore assembled an army in the Nile Delta and put two generals in charge of defending Samannud. Hearing of this, 'Amr went north to destroy this army. The two generals in Samannud refused to fight the Muslims, but Theodore fought 'Amr there and defeated him, inflicting many casualties on the Muslims. Unable to damage any cities in the Nile Delta, they retreated back to Babylon. However, Theodore was unable to follow up this victory by recapturing Babylon.

The final assault of the Muslims was on Good Friday, April 6 641, and by Easter Monday the Roman troops had evacuated and began marching to Nikiû. The Romans were given a few days to evacuate so they might celebrate Easter. Many Copts who were imprisoned in Babylon, either for refusing to accept Chalcedon or on suspicion of treachery, were released from prison by the Romans, but Eudocianus, the brother of Domentianus, had them scourged and their hands cut off.

=== Summons to Constantinople ===
Heraclius died in February 641, two months before the fall of the Babylon Fortress, and was succeeded by his two sons Constantine III and Heraclonas as co-emperors. Heraclonas' mother, Martina, ruled through Heraclonas because of his young age and consistently opposed Constantine. Constantine, following his father's wishes, summoned Cyrus from exile and Theodore from Egypt to Constantinople to discuss the invasion. Cyrus was in favour of surrendering to the Muslims, whereas Theodore wanted to continue fighting them and hoped the Emperor would send reinforcements to Egypt. Constantine had been preparing a fleet to send to Egypt, but died on May 25 after a reign of just 100 days. With Heraclonas as sole emperor, Martina gained complete control over the government. She had Heraclonas give Cyrus express permission to make peace at any price with the Arabs, but also gave him reinforcements and a new general named Constantine to replace John. After Theodore and Cyrus' left for Egypt with reinforcements, Martina was deposed by Valentine, who sent envoys to Rhodes with a message to Cyrus' troops, telling them to return to Constantinople and not to side with Cyrus. He also sent a letter to Alexandria telling the defenders not to obey Martina, and to keep fighting. Theodore was pleased to hear this, and without telling Cyrus or anyone but the captain, he secretly attempted to sail from Rhodes to Pentapolis. (Note: It is unclear what Theodore's motives were. Butler suggests "He may have desired merely retirement and shelter from the coming storms; or he may have resolved, like Heraclius, to stake his fortune on a throw for the crown, and to found a new empire at Carthage; or he may have wished to gather resources and watch events, detesting the policy of surrender and hoping to strike a blow at the Muslims from Carthage.") However, the captain of the ship claimed the wind was contrary to him, and Theodore was stuck with Cyrus. They returned to Alexandria on September 14, 641, the Feast of the Cross.

Meanwhile in Egypt, the governor Anastasius had been left in charge, and during his time the Muslims captured both Babylon and Nikiu. Domentianus and his soldiers were guarding Nikiu. When he saw the enemy approaching cravenly fled the city in a small boat, leaving his soldiers to their fate. They attempted to follow him, but in the panic the boatmen fled to their home provinces, leaving many of the soldiers stranded. When the Arabs arrived, the soldiers threw their weapons into the water before their enemies, hoping to be spared, but instead they were all massacred. According to John of Nikiu, the only man who lived to tell the tale was a "gallant warrior" named Zacharias. The Muslims then passed by Sais and, finding relatives of Theodore there, killed them. John of Nikiu writes that "Egypt also had become enslaved to Satan. A great strife had broken out between the inhabitants of Lower Egypt, and these were divided into two parties. Of these, one sided with Theodore, but the other wished to join the Moslem." The Muslims had also begun their Siege of Alexandria.

=== Siege of Alexandria ===
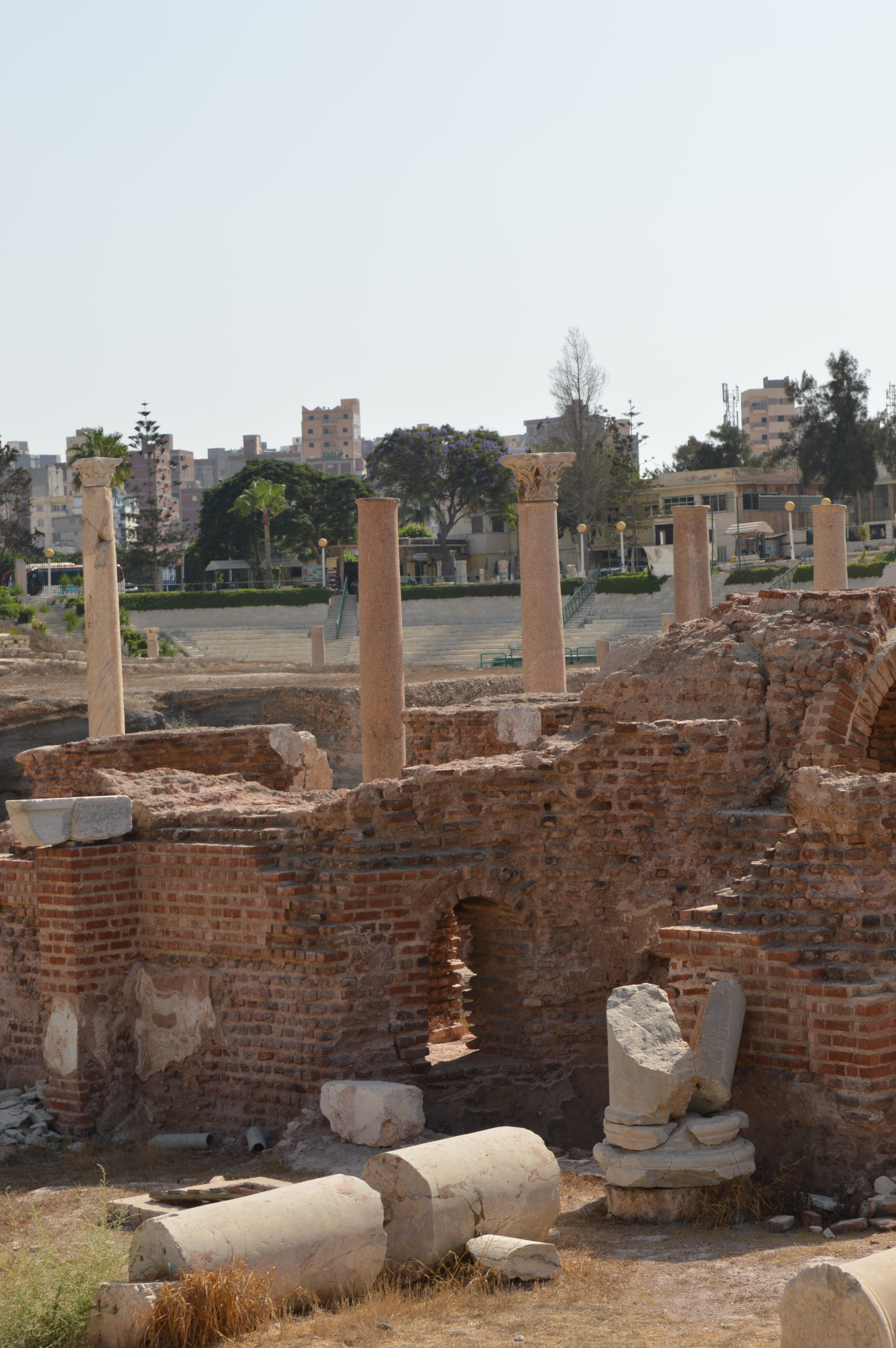
Remains of the Roman amphitheatre in Alexandria

When Theodore returned to Alexandria, he dismissed Domentianus as the military commander of the garrison and exiled him from the city, replacing him with Menas, who was a non-Chalcedonian Copt and popular with the army. Menas held a grudge against Domentianus' brother Eudocianus for Eudocianus' torture of the Coptic prisoners in Babylon. Theodore was angry with Domentianus for his cowardly flight from Nikiu and took Menas' side in their quarrel. Despite being brothers-in-law, Domentianus also disrespected Cyrus and showed him unreasonable hatred. He enlisted the Blues in Alexandria to his side, to which Menas responded by enlisting the Greens. There also came to Alexandria Philiades, prefect of the province of Faiyum and brother of Patriarch George I of Alexandria. Philiades was Menas' friend, but unlike Menas he was corrupt and unpopular, so much so that he was nearly lynched.

Since Theodore and Cyrus' arrival in Egypt was on September 14, 641, the Feast of the Cross, a great procession was organised from their landing place to Alexandria. Their entire path was covered in carpets, hymns were sung, and a piece of the True Cross which was earlier brought to Egypt by John, Duke of Barcaina, and stored in a church of the Theodosians, was carried with Cyrus and Theodore. The procession passed between Cleopatra's Needles and entered the Caesareum Church, where a liturgy was prayed. The Psalm reading of the day was Psalm 118:24, (Note: "This is the day the Lord has made; We will rejoice and be glad in it.") but the deacon said another psalm hoping to praise Cyrus and congratulate him on his return. This was said to be a bad omen. Cyrus then gave a sermon about the discovery of the True Cross, perhaps encouraging them to resist the siege in the name of the Cross, despite having already decided in himself to forsake the Cross and surrender to the Muslims.

Cyrus then went to Babylon to negotiate with 'Amr, and agreed the following treaty:

1. Payment of a fixed tribute by all who came under the treaty.
2. An armistice of about eleven months, to expire the first day of the Coptic month Paophi, i.e. September 28, 642.
3. During the armistice the Arab forces to maintain their positions, but to keep apart and undertake no military operations against Alexandria; the Roman forces to cease all acts of hostility.
4. The garrison of Alexandria and all troops there to embark and depart by sea, carrying all their possessions and treasure with them: but any Roman soldiers quitting Egypt by land to be subject to a monthly tribute on their journey.
5. No Roman army to return or attempt the recovery of Egypt.
6. The Muslims to desist from all seizure of churches, and not to interfere in any way with the Christians.
7. The Jews to be suffered to remain at Alexandria.
8. Hostages to be given by the Romans, viz. 150 military and 50 civilian, for the due execution of the treaty.

He then returned to Alexandria and reported the terms of this humiliating treaty to Theodore and Constantine, convincing them that it was necessary and telling them to report it to the Emperor Heraclonas, who ratified it in what may had been his last act as Emperor, as he was deposed in November. The local populace was not informed of it until an Arab army approached Alexandria to receive the tribute, and the Byzantine generals told the people not to resist. Realising what had happened, a furious mob attempted to stone Cyrus, but he said to them "I have made this treaty in order to save you and your children" and wept before them, which calmed the riot down. The first installment of tribute was paid on 10 December 641, sealing the surrender of Alexandria.

=== Aftermath ===
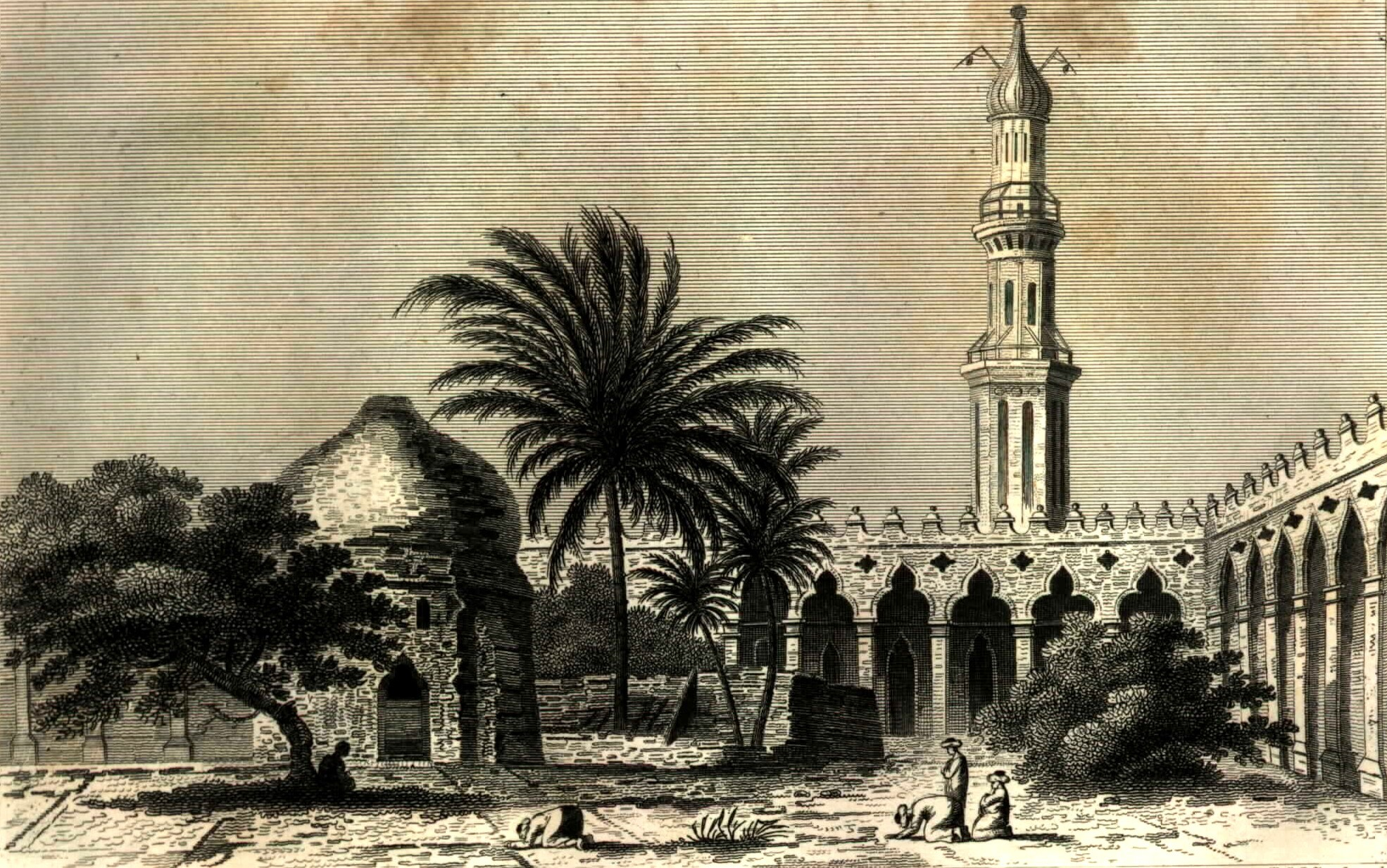
The Attarine Mosque in Alexandria was originally a church but was converted to a mosque after the surrender of Alexandria.

After the siege was over, Cyrus negotiated with 'Amr to allow the Egyptians who had taken refuge in Alexandria during the war to return to their lands, but he apparently did not allow them to do so. Towns along the northern coast of the Nile Delta remained outside Muslim control for some more years; 'Amr evidently did not consider them a priority. He began building his new capital, Fustat, just outside Babylon, and the Byzantine prefects and governors of Egypt either converted to Islam to retain their positions, or were replaced by Muslims. 'Amr and these Muslim governors forced the Christians to work for them, and made them dig a canal from the Nile to the Red Sea.

Cyrus fell into depression and died on Holy Thursday, March 21, 642. Theodore arranged the withdrawal of Byzantine forces from Alexandria. One of his last acts was to install a general named John as prefect of Alexandria to co-operate in the transition of power to the Arabs. On September 17, 642, Theodore left Egypt and set sail for Cyprus with the last Roman troops. Then on September 29, the 11 months of armistice ended, and 'Amr marched at the head of his Arab army into Alexandria, thus marking the end of Roman Egypt after 671 years. (Note: Since the Battle of Alexandria in 30 BC)

Theodore's fate after leaving for Cyprus is unknown. He did not take part in the Byzantine Empire's attempt to recover Egypt three years later.
