= Battle of Heliopolis =

640 battle between the Byzantine Empire and Rashidun Caliphate

- Part of the Arab conquest of Egypt (Arab–Byzantine wars)
Date	6 July 640 CE
Location	Near Heliopolis (now Ain Shams outside Cairo), Egypt 30°07′46″N 31°17′20″E
Result	Rashidun victory

Belligerents
Rashidun Caliphate	Byzantine Empire

Commanders and leaders
Amr ibn al-As	Theodore; Theodosius; Anastasius

Strength
Muslim sources: ~4,000 initially; ~8,000 after reinforcements; 15,500 in a later al-Kindī tradition	Unknown; described as a large force by Muslim sources; modern estimates ~20,000

Casualties and losses
Few	Heavy
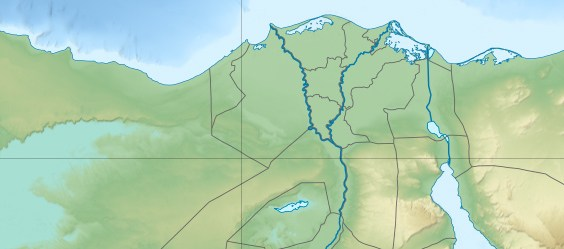
- Location within Nile Delta Battle of Heliopolis (Lower Egypt) Battle of Heliopolis (Egypt)

The Battle of Heliopolis or Ayn Shams was a decisive battle in 640 between Arab Muslim armies and Byzantine Empire forces for the control of Egypt. Though there were several major skirmishes after this battle, it effectively decided the fate of the Byzantine rule in Egypt, and opened the door for the Muslim conquest of the Roman Exarchate of Africa.

== Background to the Islamic conquests ==
At the time of the death of Muhammad on 8 June 632, Islam had effectively unified the entire Arabian Peninsula. Within the next twelve years, under the rule of the first two Caliphs an Islamic empire arose that annexed all of what used to be the Sassanid Empire, and most of the eastern provinces of the Byzantine Empire. The Muslim Caliphate continued to expand until by the turn of the 8th-century, it stretched from the Atlantic Ocean in the west to Central Asia in the east.

Under the first Caliph, Abu Bakr, force was used to prevent unrest and rebellion from causing the collapse of the new Islamic state, and the first raids were carried out into the territory of the Sassanid Empire. But the all-out attack on the neighboring empires came with the ascension of the second Caliph, Umar. When the new Caliph began his rule in 634, the international situation in the Middle East could hardly have been more propitious for a new and ambitious power: the region's two traditional main powers, the Byzantine and the Sassanid Empires, had exhausted each other in a conflict that raged for over 20 years. By the 630s, Sassanid Persia had descended into a state of civil war, while Byzantium, under the aging emperor Heraclius, its manpower and resources depleted in the struggle with its old adversary, was struggling to re-establish its authority in its newly re-conquered eastern provinces. The two states were thus in considerable internal turmoil, and unable to either stop the Muslim expansion or to recover from its first blows. It is unknown whether Umar intended from the outset to conquer both the Sassanid and the Byzantine Empire, or simply allowed raids, and then, perceiving their weakness, followed up with full-scale invasion.

== Arab conquest of Egypt ==
After successfully conquering Syria between 634 and 638, the Arabs turned their attention to Egypt. The attack on Africa took the Byzantines by surprise. Heraclius's generals had advised him that the Muslims would need a generation to digest Persia before undertaking another wholesale conquest. The increasingly frail Emperor was forced to depend on his generals, and the result was complete disaster.

In 639, less than a year after the complete fall of the Sassanid Empire, an army of some 4,000 commanded by Amr ibn al-As, under orders of Omar, began the invasion of the Diocese of Egypt. That relatively tiny force marched from Syria through El-Arish, easily took Farama, and from there proceeded to Bilbeis, where they were delayed for a month. But having captured Bilbeis, the Arabs moved again, eerily echoing Heraclius' successful campaign against the Sassanids just a short decade ago. A small force, commanded by a charismatic and tactically brilliant commander went behind enemy lines, and caused chaos all out of proportion to their size. They laid siege to the fortress of Babylon near modern Cairo, which withstood Amr's siege for seven months. In the meantime Amr and his army marched (or rode) to a point on the Nile called Umm Dunein. The siege of this city caused Amr and his horsemen considerable difficulty as they lacked siege engines and overwhelming numbers. After finally taking Umm Dunein, Amr crossed the Nile to Faiyum. There, on 6 June 640, a second army dispatched by Omar arrived at Heliopolis (the modern Ain Shams) and began to lay siege to it. Amr retraced his route across the Nile River, and united his forces with those of the second army. They began to prepare for movement towards Alexandria – but scouts reported the approach of the Byzantine army.

=== Battle ===
At that point the united Arab army was confronted by a Roman army, which Amr, who had taken overall command, defeated at the Battle of Heliopolis. Just as Byzantine generals had failed in Syria, they did in Egypt, and the Empire's economically most valuable province after Anatolia was lost. The battle took place sometime in early to mid July 640, near the ancient city of Heliopolis, with Arab forces totaling approximately 15,000 under the command of Amr ibn al-As, and the Byzantine forces estimated at well over 20,000 under Theodore, commander of all Byzantine forces in Egypt. Anastasius, the prefect of Alexandria, and Theodosius, the prefect of Arcadia Aegypti, were in charge of the cavalry.

The Byzantine army could have responded sooner, but had not, for reasons that will never be known. Though historians such as Butler blame the treachery of the Coptic Christians as well as the failure of the Byzantine generals for the swift fall of the Exarchate of Egypt, Gibbon does not blame anyone as much as he praises the character and genius of Amr for the victory at Heliopolis. Gibbon says "the conquest of Egypt may be explained by the character of the victorious Saracen, one of the first of his nation."

Whether through the foolishness of the Byzantine generals, including Theodore, contributed to what then occurred, certainly Amr fought a brilliant battle at Heliopolis. When the Byzantine army began approaching, Amr divided his army into three separate units, with one detachment under the command of a trusted commander, Kharija. This unit marched abruptly east to nearby hills, where they effectively hid. This unit was to remain there until the Romans had begun the battle, at which point they were to fall on the Roman flank or rear, whichever was more vulnerable. The second detachment Amr ordered to the south, which would be the direction the Romans would flee if the battle went badly. Once the Byzantine forces initiated contact with Amr's forces and commenced an attack, the detachment of Kharija attacked the Byzantine rear, which was completely unexpected by the Romans. Theodore had not kept scouts out, or, if he had, he ignored their warning of the approaching Arab horsemen. This attack from the rear created utter chaos among the Byzantine ranks. As Theodore's troops attempted to flee to the south, they were attacked by the third detachment, which had been placed there for just such a purpose. This completed the final break-down and defeat of the Byzantine army, which fled in all directions.

The Roman garrison at Tendunias (located at Azbakeya according to Butler), was seized when Zubayr and some of his handpicked soldiers scaled the Heliopolis city wall at an unguarded point and, after overpowering the guards, opened the gates for the army to enter the city. Of the Byzantine soldiers there, only 300 survived. These retreated to the fortress at Babylon. Some of them, hearing of the slaughter of the Byzantine Army, were terrified and fled further to Nikiû by boat. Theodore, Theodosius and Anastasius were among the survivors.

== Aftermath ==
When Domentianus, governor of Faiyum heard of the defeat, he left his camp at Abûît and fled to Nikiû without even informing the locals that he was abandoning them to the Muslims. When news reached 'Amr, he sent troops across the Nile to invade Fayoum and Abuit, capturing the entire province of Fayoum with practically no resistance. Fayoum's population was enslaved, and the city was looted (the traditional fate of cities that had resisted). 'Amr then directed his troops to Delas, where he forced Apa Cyrus, pagarch of Heracleopolis Magna, to supply him and his army with boats to travel along the Nile. He also made George, the prefect of the province around Babylon, build bridges for him at Qalyub, Athribis, Menouf and Babylon. John of Nikiû continues "Not content with that, 'Amr had the Roman magistrates arrested and their hands and feet fettered with chains or logs of wood: he extorted great sums of money, laid a double tax on the peasants, whom he forced to bring forage for his horses, and he committed innumerable acts of violence." Many Byzantine commanders in Nikiû fled to Alexandria, leaving Domentianus and a small garrison to defend Nikiû.

The next year and a half were spent on more maneuvers, skirmishes, and sieges before the formal surrender of the capital, Alexandria, took place on 4 November 641. But Sir Walter Scott asserts that "the fate of Byzantine Africa was decided at the Battle of Heliopolis". For the Byzantine Empire, permanently losing Egypt meant the loss of an irreplaceable source of food and money. The loss of Egypt and Syria, followed later by the conquest of the Exarchate of Africa also meant that the Mediterranean, long a "Roman lake", was now contested between two powers: the Muslim Caliphate and the Byzantines. In the event, the Byzantine Empire, although sorely tested, would be able to hold on to Anatolia, while the mighty walls of Constantinople would save it, during two great Arab sieges, from the fate of the Persian Empire.
