= Siege of Babylon Fortress =

640 battle between the Byzantine Empire and Rashidun Caliphate

- Part of the Arab conquest of Egypt (Arab–Byzantine wars)
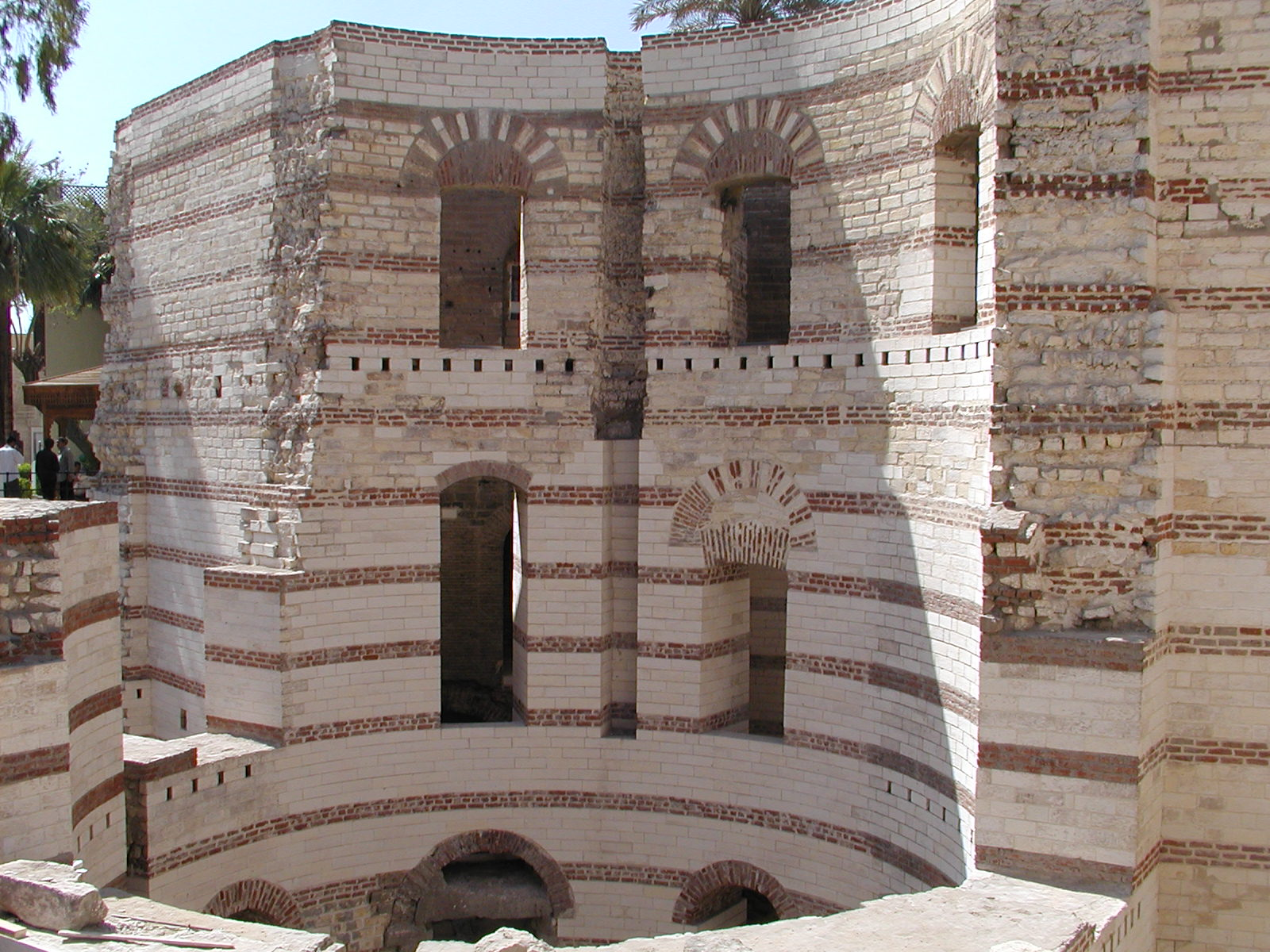
- Remains of the Babylon Fortress.
Date	September 640 – 6 April 641
Location	Babylon Fortress, Old Cairo, Egypt 30.0061°N 31.2297°E
Result	Muslim victory

Belligerents
Rashidun Caliphate	Byzantine Empire

Commanders and leaders
Amr ibn al-A'as; Ubadah ibn al-Samit	Theodore

Strength
12,000	Unknown

Casualties and losses
Unknown	Unknown

The Babylon Fortress, a major military stronghold of the Byzantine Empire in Egypt, was captured by forces of the Rashidun Caliphate after a prolonged siege in 640. It was a major event during the Arab conquest of Egypt.

== Prelude ==
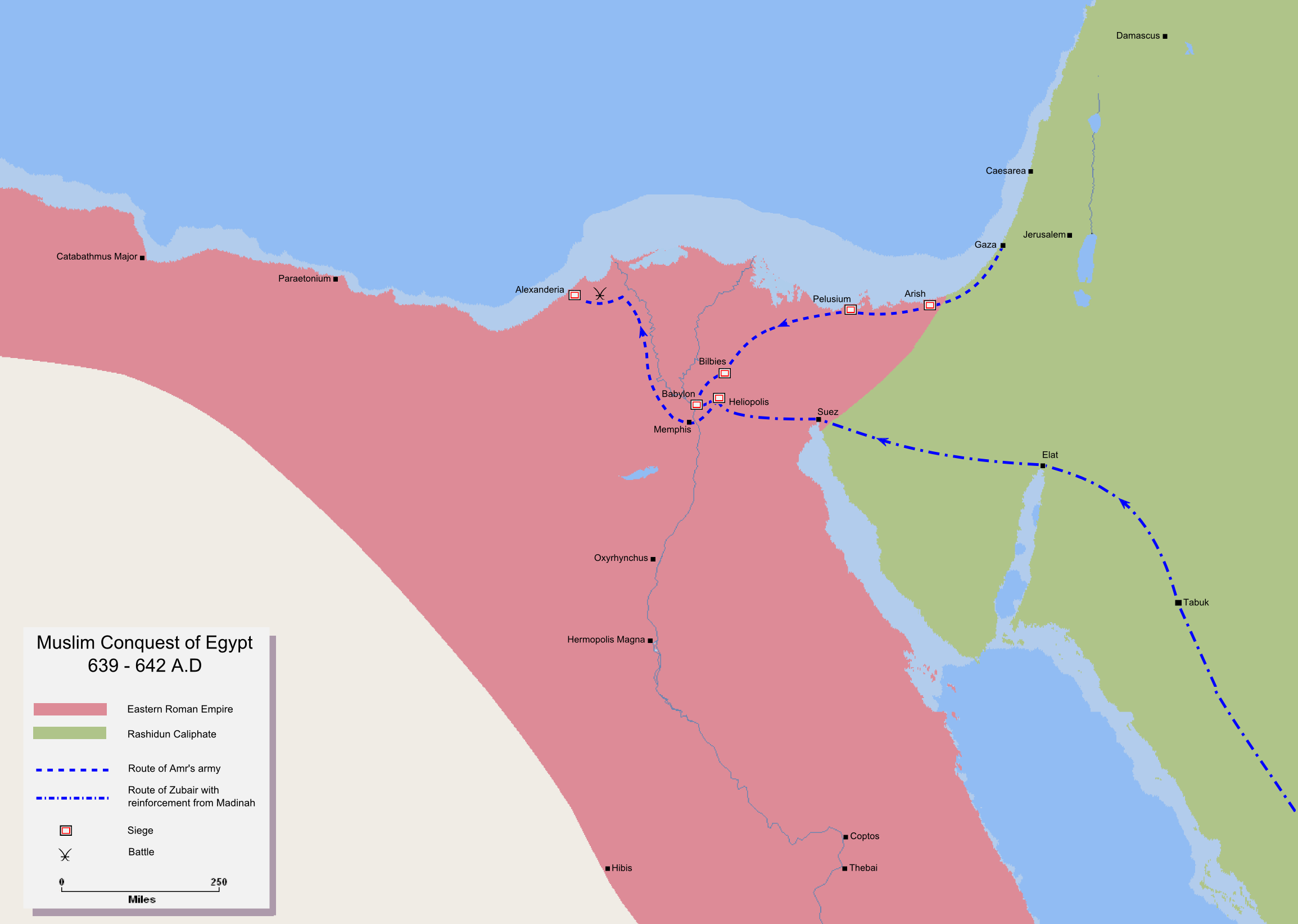
Map detailing the route of the Muslims' invasion of Egypt

Amr had assumed that Egypt would be a pushover but was quickly proven wrong. Even at the outposts of Pelusium and Belbeis, the Muslims had met stiff resistance, with sieges of two and one months, respectively. As Babylon, near what is now Cairo, was a larger and more important city, resistance on a larger scale was expected. The Muslims arrived at Babylon some time in May 640.

Babylon was a fortified city, and Theodore had indeed prepared it for a siege. Outside the city, a ditch had been dug, and a large force was positioned in the area between the ditch and the city walls. The Muslims besieged the fort, a massive structure 18 m (59 ft) high with walls more than 2 metres (6.6 feet) thick and studded with numerous towers and bastions and a force of some 4,000 men. Early Muslim sources place the strength of the Byzantine force in Babylon at about six times the strength of the Muslim force. For the next two months, fighting remained inconclusive, with the Byzantines repulsing every Muslim assault.

Realizing that Babylon was too strong to take, 'Amr sent a detachment to raid the city of Faiyum. The Byzantines had anticipated that and so had strongly guarded the roads that led to the city and had fortified their garrison in the nearby town of Lahun. At this time, the governor of Faiyum was Domentianus, while Theodosius was the prefect of its province, Arcadia Aegypti, and Anastasius was the prefect of Alexandria. The defense of Arcadia Aegypti was entrusted to a certain John, whom Hermann Zotenberg identifies with the John, Duke of Barca or Barcaina mentioned by Nicephorus. He had brought the Ecthesis and a portion of the True Cross from Patriarch Sergius to Cyrus and was likely on a direct commission from Emperor Heraclius.

When the Muslims realized that Faiyum was also too strong for them to take, they headed towards the Western Desert, where they looted as many cattle and animals as they could. They subsequently headed to a town in the Faiyum district named Bahnasa (not to be confused with Oxyrhynchus 50 miles further south), which was defeated and captured. According to John of Nikiû, "they compelled the city to open its gates, and they put to the sword all that surrendered, and they spared none, whether old men, babe, or woman." The Arabs then noticed that John, with a small group of 50 men, had been following them. John and his men ran retreated to their base at Abûît, but their hiding place was betrayed by a Bedouin chief, and they were all killed.

When news of John's death reached Theodore, who was commanding the garrison at Babylon, 'his lamentations were more grievous than the lamentations of David over Saul when he said: "How are the mighty fallen, and the weapons of war perished!"' as John of Nikiu puts it. Theodore hurried his troops up the Nile while Anastasius and Theodosius rushed from Nikiû to Babylon to strengthen it, while a further force was sent from Babylon to Abûît to strengthen it under Leontius, who was "obese in person, quite without energy and unacquainted with warlike affairs". When he arrived, he found Theodore and his troops there already making sorties every day against the Arab base at Bahnasa. Judging that Amr would soon be defeated, Leontius left only half of his men there, going back to Babylon with the other half.

The Arabs eventually gave up on attempting to take Faiyum and returned northwards. Theodore gave orders for the body of John, which had been thrown in the Nile, to be found. It was retrieved with a net, embalmed with honour and sent back to Heraclius. As Theodore was commander-in-chief, Heraclius blamed him for John's death. Feeling that he was blamed due to negative reports from Theodosius and Anastasius, Theodore formed an enmity with them.

=== Reinforcements from Madinah ===
In July, 'Amr wrote to 'Umar requesting reinforcements, but before the letter reached him, the caliph had already dispatched 4,000 men, mostly veterans of the Syrian campaigns, to bolster Amr's strength. Even with the reinforcements, 'Amr was unsuccessful and so, by August, 'Umar had assembled another 4,000-strong force, consisting of four columns, each of 1,000 elite men. Zubayr ibn al-Awwam, a renowned warrior and commander, veteran of the Battle of Yarmouk and once a part of Khalid ibn al-Walid's elite mobile guard, was appointed the supreme commander of the army.

'Umar had also offered Zubayr the chief command and governorship of Egypt, but Zubayr had declined. The column commanders included Miqdad ibn al-Aswad, 'Ubaidah ibn as-Samit and Kharijah ibn Hudhaifah. The reinforcements arrived at Babylon sometime in September 640, bringing the total strength of the Muslim force to 12,000, still quite modest.

It is said that a Coptic soldier, seeing the size of the Muslim force, expressed amazement that such a small force could stand against the Emperor’s army, whereto another soldier replied that Arabs could not yield, and had to either emerge victorious or die to the last man. In another anecdote, some Roman soldiers refused to fight, saying 'We have small chance against the men who have conquered Chosroes and Caesar in Syria.'

=== Battle of Heliopolis ===
When Zubayr arrived, he pointed out to ‘Amr that the Roman-garrisoned city of Heliopolis was a short distance away and that troops from there could relieve the siege of Babylon. To remove this threat, ‘Amr went with about half of his men there.

The Muslim army reached Heliopolis, 15 km (10 mi) from Babylon, in July 640. The city boasted the Sun Temple of the Pharaohs and grandiose monuments and learning institutions. There was the danger that forces from Heliopolis could attack the Muslims from the flank while they were engaged with the Roman army at Babylon.

There was a cavalry clash near the current neighbourhood of Abbaseya. The engagement was not decisive, but it resulted in the occupation of the fortress located between the current neighborhoods of Abdyn and Azbakeya. The defeated Byzantine soldiers retreated to either the Babylon Fortress or the fortress of Nikiû. Zubayr and some of his handpicked soldiers scaled the Heliopolis city wall at an unguarded point and, after overpowering the guards, opened the gates for the army to enter the city. After the capture of Heliopolis, 'Amr and his forces returned to Babylon.

== Conquering of Fayoum and Babylon ==
When news of the Muslims' victory at Heliopolis reached Fayoum, its governor, Domentianus, and his troops fled without informing the people of Fayoum and Abuit that they were abandoning their cities to the enemy. When news reached 'Amr, he sent troops across the Nile to invade Fayoum and Abuit, capturing the entire province of Fayoum without any resistance and massacring its inhabitants.

The Byzantine garrison at Babylon had grown bolder than ever before and had begun to sally forth across the ditch but with little success. The stalemate was broken when the Muslim commanders devised an ingenious strategy, inflicting heavy casualties on the Byzantine forces by encircling them from three sides during one of their sallies. The Byzantines were able to retreat back to the fort but were left too weak for any further offensive action, forcing them to negotiate. The Byzantine general, Theodore, shifted his headquarters to the Isle of Rauda, and Cyrus of Alexandria, popularly known as Muqawqis in Muslim history, entered into negotiations with the Muslims.

Emissaries were exchanged between Theodore and 'Amr, leading to 'Amr meeting Theodore in person. Then, with negotiations stalled, during the night of 20 December, a company of handpicked warriors, led by Zubayr, managed to scale the wall, kill the guards, and open the gates for the Muslim army to enter. The city was captured by the Muslims the following morning with tactics similar to those that had been used by Khalid ibn Walid at Damascus. However, Theodore and his army managed to slip away to the island of Rauda during the night, whence they continued to fight the Muslims.

The final assault of the Muslims was on Good Friday, April 6, 641, and by Easter Monday the Roman troops had evacuated and begun marching to Nikiû. The Romans were given a few days to evacuate so they might celebrate Easter. Many Copts who were imprisoned in Babylon, either for refusing to accept Chalcedon or on suspicion of treachery, were released from prison by the Romans, but Eudocianus, the brother of Domentianus, had them scourged and their hands cut off. The Siege of Babylon had lasted seven months.

According to al-Tabari, upon seeing the Arabs in rags during the fall of Babylon, some Coptic soldiers remarked, "Alas! Why did we not know that the Arabs were in such an evil plight? For we would have continued the struggle and not delivered the city.' When ‘Amr heard of this, he invited some of them to a feast, in which he had a camel killed, boiled its flesh in salt water, and then served it before Muslims and Copts. The Muslims ate the meat, but the Copts turned away in disgust and went home dinnerless. The next day ‘Amr ordered his cooks to search the nearest town for every dainty and delicious dish they could find and invited the same group over for another feast. When they had finished eating, Amr said to the Copts, 'I must have for you all the regard which our kinship imposes. But I understand that you are plotting to take up arms once more against me. Now, aforetime, the Arabs ate camel's meat, as you saw yesterday, but now when they have discovered all this dainty fare that you see before you, do you think that they will surrender this city? I tell you they will give their lives first; they will fight to the death. Do not therefore hurl yourselves to destruction. Either embrace the religion of Islam, or pay your tribute, and go your ways to your villages.'

== Surrender of Thebaid (Southeastern Egypt) ==
According to Al-Maqrizi, during the siege of Babylon, Cyrus sent 'Amr an envoy, including the Chalcedonian bishop of Babylon, with the message, 'You and your army have invaded our country and seem bent on fighting us. Your stay in the land is long, no doubt, but you are a small force, far outnumbered by the Romans, who are well-equipped and well-armed. Now, too, you are surrounded by the waters of the Nile and are in fact captives in our hand. It would be well for you, therefore, to send envoys with any proposals you wish to make for an agreement before the Romans overwhelm you. Then it will be too late, and you will regret your error.' ‘Amr detained them for two days, during which they were allowed to go about and observe the Arab camp, and then sent them back with the message, 'Only one of three courses is open to you: (1) Islam with brotherhood and equality; (2) payment of tribute and protection with an inferior status; (3) war till God decides between us.' When they returned to Babylon, they reported, 'We have seen a people who prefer death to life and humility to pride. They sit in the dust, and they take their meals on horseback. Their commander is one of them: there is no distinction of rank among them. They have fixed hours of prayer at which all pray, first washing their hands and feet, and they pray with reverence.'

Later, at Cyrus’s request, ‘Amr sent ten officers led by Ubadah ibn al-Samit. When Cyrus saw Ubadah, who was black, he exclaimed, 'Take away that black man: I can have no discussion with him.' But the Arabs explained that Ubadah was one of their most trusted leaders, that ‘Amr had personally commissioned him, and that they treat Black men equally. Ubadah then explained, 'There are a thousand Blacks, as black as myself, among our companions. I and they would be ready, each to meet and fight a hundred enemies together. We live only to fight for God and to follow His will. We care naught for wealth, so long as we have the wherewithal to sate our hunger and to clothe our bodies. This world is nought to us; the world is all.' Moved by his piety, Cyrus turned to his companions and said, "Do you hear this? I much fear that God has sent these men to devastate the world,' and then to Ubadah, 'I have listened, good sir, to your account of yourself and your comrades, and I understand why your arms so far have failed. I know too that the Romans have failed by caring overmuch for earthly things. But now they are preparing to send against you immense numbers of well-armed battalions. Resistance will be hopeless. But for the sake of peace, we will agree to pay a sum of money at the rate of two dinars a head for every man in the Arab army, a hundred dinars for your commander, and a thousand for your Caliph, on the condition that you return to your own country. ' Ubadah replied, 'Do not deceive yourselves. We are not afraid of your numbers. Our greatest desire is to meet the Romans in battle. If we conquer them, it is well; if not, then we receive the good things of the world to come. Our prayer is for martyrdom in the cause of Islam, not for a safe return to our wife and children. Our small numbers cause us no fear, for it is written in the Book, 'Many a time hath a small company overcome a great host, by the will of God." Understand, therefore, that we can accept no terms save one of the three conditions which we are ordered by the Caliph to offer you.'

Cyrus and his companions deliberated over which of the three options to choose. They immediately ruled out conversion to Islam, saying 'We cannot abandon the religion of Christ for a religion of which we know nothing.' They also ruled out submission and tribute, arguing that it would be tantamount to slavery, but when Ubadah explained that their persons and property would be respected and their churches and religious practice would be unharmed, it seemed reasonable to Cyrus, who chose that option. But most of his Coptic companions were not as willing to give their country over to an invader, and so they attacked the Arab camp a desperate last time. When they were driven back, ‘Amr gave the same three options to Cyrus, who chose surrender and tribute.

Thus, on 22 December, Cyrus of Alexandria entered a treaty with the Muslims, recognizing Muslim sovereignty over the whole of Egypt and effectively over Thebaid, and agreeing to pay Jizya at the rate of 2 diners per male adult. According to Nikephoros, Cyrus even suggested giving one of Heraclius' daughters in marriage to Amr. The treaty was subject to the approval of the emperor Heraclius, but Cyrus stipulated that even if the emperor repudiated the treaty, he and the Egyptians would honor its terms. Cyrus asked Heraclius to ratify the treaty and offered an argument in support. 'Amr submitted a detailed report to Umar recommending ratification. Upon hearing about this, Heraclius was furious and had Cyrus recalled to Constantinople. Cyrus arrived in November 640 and tried to defend his actions, but Heraclius angrily threatened to kill him, calling him an abject coward and a heathen and asking whether 100,000 Romans were a match for 12,000 barbarians. He then handed him to the city prefect to humiliate him and sent him to exile. Cyrus would remain in exile until his reinstatement by Heraclonas in September 641.

== Aftermath ==
Although Babylon was captured, Theodore and his army managed to slip away to Rauda during the night, whence they continued to fight the Muslims.

During this time, Theodore assembled an army in the Nile Delta and put two generals in charge of defending Samannud. Hearing of this, 'Amr went north to destroy this army. The two generals in Samannud refused to fight the Muslims, but Theodore fought 'Amr there and defeated him, inflicting many casualties on the Muslims. Unable to damage any cities in the Nile Delta, they retreated back to Babylon. However, Theodore was unable to follow up this victory by recapturing Babylon.

The Byzantine commanders knew that the next target of the Muslims would be Alexandria. They accordingly prepared for the expected siege of the city. Their strategy was to keep the Muslims away from Alexandria by destroying their power through continued sallies and attacks from the fort. Even if this did not keep them away, it would weaken them morally and physically. It would be more of a war of patience than strength. In February 641, 'Amr set off for Alexandria from Babylon with his army. All along the road from Babylon to Alexandria, the Byzantines had left regiments to delay, and if possible, inflict losses on the advancing Muslims.

== Bibliography ==
- Butler, Alfred (1902). The Arab Conquest of Egypt and the Last Thirty Years of the Roman Dominion. Oxford: Clarendon Press.
- Charles, Robert H. (2007) [1916]. The Chronicle of John, Bishop of Nikiu: Translated from Zotenberg's Ethiopic Text. Merchantville, NJ: Evolution Publishing. ISBN 9781889758879.
- Haykal, Muhammad Husayn (1944). Al Farooq, Umar.
- Kennedy, Hugh (2007). The Great Arab Conquests: How the Spread of Islam Changed the World We Live In. Philadelphia, Pennsylvania: Da Capo Press. ISBN 978-0-306-81740-3.
