= John, Duke of Barca =

7th century Byzantine general

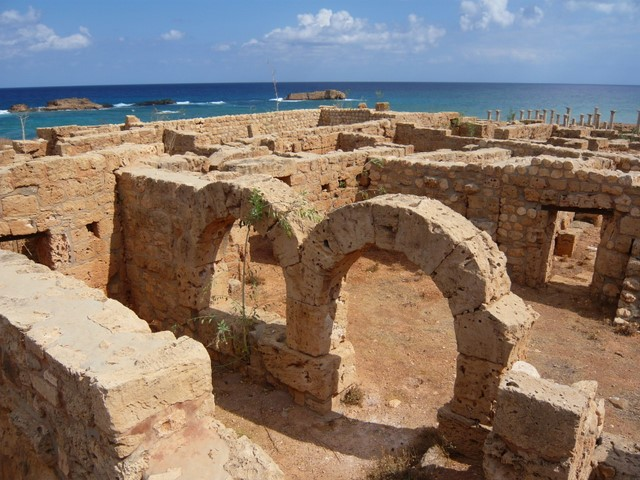
Ruins of the Byzantine dukes' palace in Apollonia, then capital of the Libyan Pentapolis

John, Duke of Barca (also John, Duke of Barcaina; Greek: Ἰωάννης ὁ Βαρκαίνης στρατηγός; d. May 640) was a Byzantine general (magister militum) and dux of the Libyan Pentapolis who died defending Egypt during the Arab conquest. There are a few mentions of him in ancient sources, but whether they all refer to the same person or not is debated.

== Identification ==
In his Short History, Patriarch Nikephoros I of Constantinople mentions a "John, general of Barcaina" (Ἰωάννην τὸν Βαρκαίνης στρατηγὸν), whom the emperor Heraclius sends to Egypt to fight the "Saracens", and who dies in battle against them. Βαρκαίνης is a genitive, and it is unclear whether the nominative form Nicephoros intended is "Barca" (Βάρκη) or "Barcaina" (Βαρκαίνη). Because of this, the name has sometimes been translated "John, Duke of Barca or Barcaina". The general consensus among historians is John was from Barca in Libya. The Prosopography of the Later Roman Empire offers an alternative interpretation, "John, son of Barcaine", but admits that Barca in Libya is the more likely meaning.

Another ancient historian, John of Nikiû, wrote a detailed Chronicle of the world's history, but unfortunately it contains a lacuna from 610 to c. 639. The narrative resumes with a general named John, who had been introduced somewhere in the lacuna, and is strongly implied to have been on a direct commission from Heraclius. He fights the Muslims in a town named Bahnasa, but is killed by them. The Chronicle later mentions that Cyrus of Alexandria had received a portion of the True Cross (likely along with the Ecthesis) from "the general John". This matches a surviving letter from Cyrus to Sergius I of Constantinople, in which he thanks him for the Ecthesis and mentions that he received it from the "general of the militia".

Earlier historians, such as Hermann Zotenberg, Alfred J. Butler, Leone Caetani and Robert Charles, unanimously accepted that John of Nikiu and Nikephoros referred to the same person. But more recent scholars, while still generally acknowledging that as the most likely possibility, are less certain. Some, such as Walter Kaegi, still have no doubt that John of Nikiu referred to John of Barcaina. However, Phil Booth believes that Nicephorus' John of Barcaina and the John whom the Muslims killed at Bahnasa are two different people, and that John the "general of the militia" who brought the True Cross and Ecthesis to Cyrus was either one of them or a third person altogether.

== Biography ==
John was a general from Barca in Libya, and the dux of the Libyan Pentapolis. By his time, the dux was no longer just a military commander, but essentially the governor of the Pentapolis. While the Emperor Heraclius was in Syria fighting a Muslim invasion there (c. 636), he appointed John of Barca to defend Egypt in case the Arabs invade it too. John therefore marched into Egypt with reinforcements from Libya.

Later, in 638, he was charged by the Patriarch of Constantinople, Sergius, to take the Ecthesis to Cyrus of Alexandria. As a gift, he took with it a "venerable cross", likely a portion of the True Cross which had been recently regained by Heraclius.

In late 639, an Arab army led by Amr ibn al-As invaded Egypt, taking the cities of Pelusium and Bilbeis and marching southwards along the edge of the Nile Delta into Arcadia Aegypti, an Egyptian province that John was entrusted to defend. John stationed guards at Lahun to guard the entrance to the Faiyum. After having spies inform him of their movements, John attacked the Arabs with a force of cavalry and archers, halting their southward advance and forcing them to retreat into the desert. From there, they looted much cattle, then made their way to a town in the Faiyum district named Bahnasa (not the more famous Oxyrhynchus 50 miles further south). John of Barca tried to defend the town, but the Muslims managed to capture it. They killed John of Barca and all his companions, then, according to John of Nikiû, "they compelled the city to open its gates, and they put to the sword all that surrendered, and they spared none, whether old men, babe, or woman."

Amr then realised that one of John of Barca's subordinates, John of Maros (possibly a town south of Hermopolis), had been following him with a small group of 50 horsemen. Realising their danger, John of Maros and his men hid themselves in enclosures and plantations, then marched by night to Abûît. However, their hiding place was betrayed by a Bedouin chief, so they were taken prisoner by the Muslims and all put to death.

When news of this disaster reached Theodore, the commander-in-chief of Egypt, 'his lamentations were more grievous than the lamentations of David over Saul when he said: "How are the mighty fallen, and the weapons of war perished!"' as John of Nikiu puts it. Butler hypothesizes that "Theodore evidently relied on John's military skill, and was deeply concerned by his death." He ordered a search for John of Barca's body, which had been thrown in the Nile. It was retrieved with a net, embalmed with honour, placed in a bier and carried downriver to Babylon, whence it was sent back to Heraclius. Heraclius was deeply moved by John's death, and, as Theodore was commander-in-chief, blamed him for it. This resulted in Theodore forming an enmity with his fellow generals Theodosius and Anastasius, as he felt that the emperor blamed him due to negative reports from them.

== Sources ==
- Booth, Phil (2016). "The Last Years of Cyrus, Patriarch of Alexandria". Travaux et mémoires. 20 (1).
- Butler, Alfred (1978) [First published 1903]. Fraser, Peter M. (ed.). The Arab Conquest of Egypt and the Last Thirty Years of the Roman Dominion (PDF). Oxford: Clarendon Press. ISBN 9780198216780.
- Goodchild, Richard (1967). "Byzantines, Berbers and Arabs in 7th-century Libya" (PDF). Antiquity. 41.
- Jones, A. H. M.; Martindale, J. R; Morris, John (1992). The Prosopography of the Later Roman Empire. Vol. III: A.D. 527–641. Oxford University Press. ISBN 978-0-521-20160-5.
- Kaegi, Walter Emil (1995). Byzantium and the early Islamic conquests. Cambridge: Cambridge University Press. ISBN 978-0-521-48455-8.
- Rosenwein, Barbara H. (2023). A Short Medieval Reader. University of Toronto Press. ISBN 978-1-4875-6342-4.
