= Armenousa =

Legendary daughter of Cyrus of Alexandria

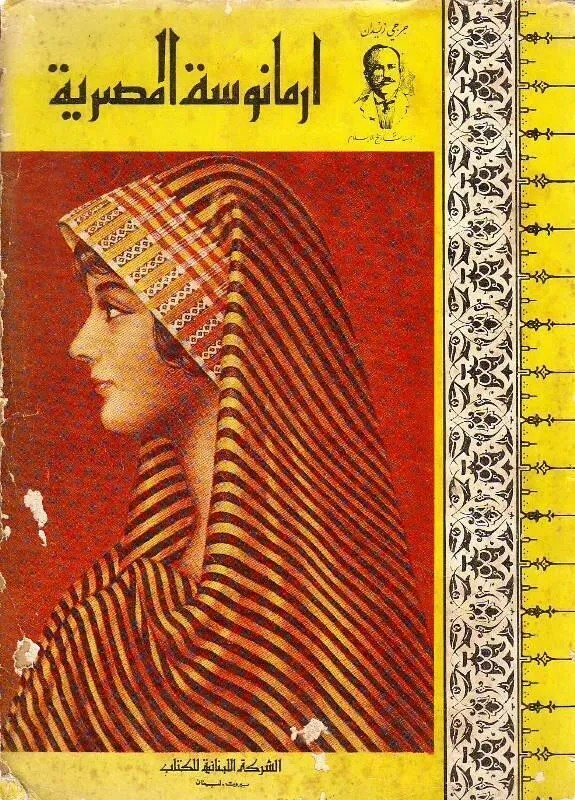
Cover of Armanusa al-Misriyya (1895) by Jurji Zaydan

Armenousa (fl. 7th century) was, according to legend, a daughter of Cyrus of Alexandria and intended bride of Heraclius Constantine who defended Egypt during the Arab conquest. Her historicity is questioned by most modern historians, particularly Alfred J. Butler, who said that "these myths, which are often inspired by the fancy of the Arabian Nights, must be banished from the domain of history".

== Background ==
Armenousa is mentioned by several Arabic chroniclers, such as Al-Waqidi (Note: The book she appears in, Kitâb Futûh Misr, was historically ascribed to al-Wakidi. Historians now agree that it was misattributed, but for convenience still refer to its author as "al-Wakidi".) and al-Maqrizi. They describe her as the daughter of Al-Muqawqis (generally identified with Cyrus of Alexandria). This poses a problem, because Byzantine sources do not mention Cyrus having a wife or daughter, and, as Butler points out, being unmarried was a requirement for bishops by this time (although there were rare exceptions like John the Merciful).

Al-Waqidi also implies that, although she fluently spoke Greek and many other languages, her native language was Coptic.

== Legend ==
The story states that Cyrus had a beautiful daughter named Armenousa, whom he sought to marry to Heraclius Constantine, the widowed son and heir of Emperor Heraclius. Constantine, who was then at Caesarea, accepted the marriage proposal, so in late 639 Armenousa left Babylon for Caesarea in a grand marriage procession which included two thousand horsemen, along with slaves and a long caravan laden with treasures that served both as dowry and tribute. When she arrived at Faqous, she heard that the Arabs had invaded Syria, that Constantine had sailed for Constantinople, and that an Arab army headed by Amr ibn al-As was preparing to invade Egypt. She dispatched her cubicularius Tsemilathous (Note: Hamaker's romanisation of the Arabic ثمبلاطوس) with 2000 of her horsemen to defend Pelusium, a garrison city considered to be the eastern gateway to Egypt at the time, while she herself sent requests for reinforcements to her father Cyrus and remained in Belbeis with more of her guards, encouraging its inhabitants to make a stand against the invaders.

In December of 639 or early January 640, the Muslim army reached Pelusium. The siege of the town dragged on for two months. During this time, al-Waqidi tells a story of an Arab soldier named Youkana, a convert from Christianity to Islam, who attempted to kidnap Armenousa. Disguised as a messenger from Heraclius Constantine, he told Tsemilathous that Constantine was waiting for Armenousa in Caesarea and had sent him to escort her. Tsemilathous led him to Armenousa, and at first they both believed him. However, when Youkana's deception was uncovered, they chastised him for forsaking "Christ and his mother". Armenousa's guards then battled with Youkana's men until nightfall, after which both sides withdrew.

After taking Pelusium, the Muslims marched on to Bilbeis, where Armenousa and her father were, and besieged it. Cyrus, accompanied by two Christian monks (Note: According to Arabic legends, these were two bishops named Abu Miriam and Abu Maryam. Butler tenuously identifies them with two generals named Marinus and Marianus, mentioned by Nicephorus and Severus.) and the famous Byzantine general Aretion, came out to negotiate with 'Amr. 'Amr gave them three options: convert to Islam, pay the jizya, or fight. They requested three days to reflect and then, according to al-Tabari, requested two extra days.

At the end of the five days, the two monks and the general decided to reject Islam and the jizya and fight the Muslims, thus disobeying Cyrus, who wanted to surrender and pay jizya. Cyrus left for the Babylon Fortress. The battle resulted in a Muslim victory during which Aretion was killed, and Armenousa was captured with all her property and servants. But Amr, wishing to maintain good relations with Cyrus, had a general named Qays ibn Abī ʾl-ʿĀṣ al-Sahmī escort her with full honors and with all her property and retinue back to Cyrus, who was delighted to see her.

== In popular culture ==
Armenousa is the subject of at least two historical novels: Armenosa of Egypt by Charles Henry Butcher and Armanusa al-Misriyya by Jurji Zaydan, as well as a play by Yusif Ziya Talibzadeh.

== Sources ==
- Butler, Alfred (1978) [First published 1903]. Fraser, Peter M. (ed.). The Arab Conquest of Egypt and the Last Thirty Years of the Roman Dominion (PDF). Oxford: Clarendon Press. ISBN 9780198216780.
- al-Maqrizi (2022). Al-Maqrīzī: Book of Exhortations and Useful Lessons in Dealing with Topography and Historical Remains (al-Khiṭaṭ) (PDF). Translated by Stowasser, Karl.
- Hamaker, Hendrik Arent (1825). Incerti auctoris liber de expugnatione Memphidis et Alexandriae. ISBN 978-90-04-59986-4.
