= Aretion =

7th century Byzantine governor

Aretion (d. February 640) was a Byzantine governor of Jerusalem during the reign of Heraclius (r. 610–641), and a general in the Arab–Byzantine wars. He is described by al-Tabari as "the most cunning of the Byzantines, the most far-sighted, and the most harmful".

== Name ==
Since Aretion is not easily identifiable with anyone attested in Byzantine sources, his original Greek name is unknown. Most Arab sources give his name as "Arṭabūn" (أرطبون), with a few (like Abu 'l Mahasin and Al-Waqidi) instead calling him "Areṭîūn" (ارطيون). Hendrik Arent Hamaker translated the latter into Latin as "Aretion". Alfred J. Butler believed that "Aretion" was the correct form and "Artabun" was a corruption. An alternate translation is "Artabanus".

However, some historians (such as Michael Jan de Goeje) believe that "Artabun" may not be a name at all, but rather a corruption of the Roman title tribunus. This allows Aretion to be identified with other attested figures. Walter Kaegi believed he "may be identical" with Vardan, whom Al-Azdi al-Basri names as a Byzantine general at the Battle of Ajnadayn.

== Biography ==
=== Ajnadayn and Jerusalem ===
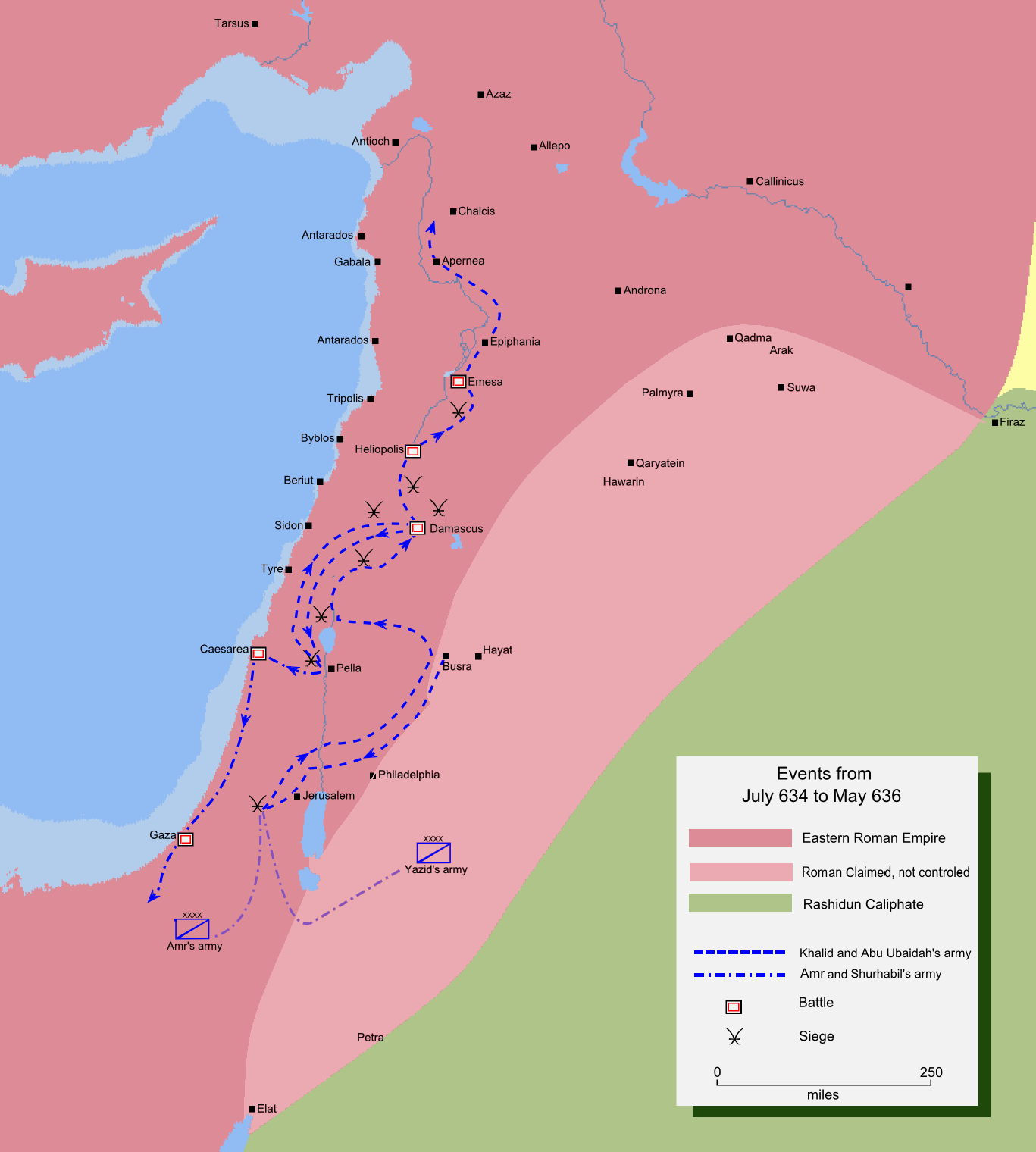
Map detailing the route of Muslim invasion of central Syria.

Aretion was the governor of Jerusalem in 634, when an Arab army led by Khalid ibn Walid invaded much of Syria. After taking Bosra, they began marching south into Palaestina Prima. Under orders from Heraclius, Aretion placed garrisons in Jerusalem and Ramla, (Note: Ramla was only founded in the 8th century, so al-Tabari's reference to it is anachronistic. He probably meant Lod.) while he himself remained in Ajnadayn (near Bayt Jibrin) to lead its defence, alongside the emperor's brother Theodore and a general named Vardan. The caliph, Umar, ordered Amr ibn al-As to go and conquer Ajnadayn. For a long time, Aretion foiled the Muslims' attempts by simply refusing to leave his fortified position at Ajnadayn. al-Tabari records several letters exchanged between Aretion and Amr, and several pleas for help from Amr to Umar. He also describes an attempted assassination of Amr by Aretion, which Amr was told about in Aretion's camp. Amr managed to escape by offering to bring more Muslim generals to Aretion's camp to negotiate, then leaving it and not returning.

On 30 July 634, Aretion was forced into an open battle with Amr, which was a disaster for the Byzantines. Their soldiers and even one of their commanders (likely Vardan) were massacred, while Aretion and Theodore retreated to Jerusalem. The Chronicle of Fredegar reports that the Arabs stole much from Ajnadayn, and even offered to resell their loot to Heraclius, but he angrily refused.

Aretion reportedly taunted Amr from Jerusalem, telling him that he "will not conquer any part of Palestine after Ajnadayn". He also told Amr that he would only surrender to Umar, not him, based on a prophecy saying that Jerusalem would be conquered by a man with three letters in his name. (Note: In Arabic, Amr is written with four letters, while Umar is written with three. According to Gustav Weil, the Byzantines probably invented this prophecy to buy time.) However, when Umar arrived in Palestine in April 637, Aretion went to Egypt to gather reinforcements, leaving Jerusalem in the hands of the Patriarch Sophronius, who surrendered it after a long siege.

=== Egypt ===
In Egypt, Aretion began rallying an imperial army to retake the Levant. This was one of the reasons Amr ibn al-As cited when he proposed an invasion of Egypt to Umar. In December 639, an Arab army headed by Amr marched into Egypt. After taking Pelusium, they continued onto Bilbeis. Cyrus of Alexandria, who was both the governor of Egypt and the Chalcedonian Patriarch of Alexandria, (Note: The majority of the Egyptians were non-Chalcedonian Oriental Christians, and instead recognised Pope Benjamin I as their rightful Pope.) came out with Aretion and two Christian monks (Note: According to Arabic legends, these were two bishops named Abu Miriam and Abu Maryam. Butler tenuously identifies them with two generals named Marinus and Marianus, mentioned by Nicephorus and Severus.) to negotiate with Amr. He offered them three alternatives: adopt Islam, pay the jizya, or engage in armed conflict. Initially, they requested three days to deliberate and then an additional two days, as recorded by al-Tabari.

At the end of the five days, Aretion, the two monks, and Cyrus' daughter Armenousa (whose existence is doubted by Butler) decided to fight the Muslims, thus disobeying Cyrus, who wanted to surrender and pay jizya. Cyrus left for the Babylon Fortress. During the subsequent conflict, the Muslim forces emerged victorious; Aretion was killed and Armenousa was captured, though she was later returned to Cyrus. Later, Amr ibn al-As attempted to persuade the Egyptians to support the Arab forces and surrender the city, citing a shared kinship through Hajar. When the Egyptians refused, the siege continued until the city fell at the end of March 640.
