= Cyrus of Alexandria =

Byzantine Patriarch and governor of Egypt (died 642)

- Κῦρος Ἀλεξανδρείας

Greek Patriarch of Alexandria
- In office 631 – 21 March 642
- Preceded by: George I
- Succeeded by: Peter IV

Governor of Egypt (de facto)
- First term 631 – November 640
- Preceded by: unknown
- Succeeded by: Anastasius
- Second term 14 September 641 – 21 March 642
- Preceded by: Anastasius
- Succeeded by: Theodore

Personal details
- Born: late 6th century Phasis, Colchis
- Died: 21 March 642 Alexandria, Egypt
- Known for: Advocacy of Monothelitism; Persecution of Copts; Surrendering Egypt to Arab conquest

Cyrus of Alexandria (Arabic: المقوقس al-Muqawqis, Greek: Κῦρος Ἀλεξανδρείας; d. 21 March 642) was a prominent figure in the 7th century Byzantine Empire. He served as a Greek Orthodox Patriarch of Alexandria, as well as the de facto governor of Egypt. As governor, he heavily persecuted the Copts, and during the Arab conquest of Egypt, continually pushed for surrender and sabotaged the Byzantine military's defence of the country. Notably, he also played a significant role in the development of monothelitism. Cyrus died in Alexandria on March 21, 642.

== Early life ==
Cyrus was born in the late 6th century. He was from the Caucasus region, hence the nickname Al-Muqawqis, from the Coptic ⲡⲓⲕⲁⲩⲕⲟⲥ meaning "the Caucasian". He had a sister, who married Domentianus the governor of Faiyum. Arabic sources name various other relatives of Cyrus, such as a daughter named Armenousa, another daughter Luliyah, two sons Aristulis and Paul, a brother Andrew, a nephew Masius, and a maternal uncle al-Hamuk or al-Hamirak who had twelve sons, including Sata and Hizbar. However, historian Karl Stowasser describes these relatives as "pure legend".

== Bishop of Phasis ==
In 620, he assumed the position of Bishop of Phasis in Colchis. In 626, during the Persian campaign led by the Byzantine Emperor Heraclius, he was consulted regarding a plan proposed by Sergius, the Patriarch of Constantinople, aimed at reconciling the Miaphysites of Egypt with the Church and gaining their support for the empire. This plan, known as the monenergist plan, involved accepting the Chalcedonian principle of two natures of Christ while effectively nullifying it by asserting that he possessed only one energy, referred to as hèn thélema kaì mía enérgeia (ἓν θέλημα καὶ μία ἐνέργεια). Cyrus embraced this formula after Sergius assured him that Pope Honorius I in Rome had endorsed it and that it did not contradict the teachings of the Church Fathers or the decisions made at the Council of Chalcedon. Cyrus was subsequently appointed by Heraclius as the Bishop of Alexandria in 630, in opposition to the Miaphysite Patriarch of Alexandria, with the intention of implementing this plan.

== Patriarch of Alexandria ==
Cyrus, once patriarch, made persistent efforts to reconcile the Miaphysites and Chalcedonians by promoting monenergism, which eventually developed into monothelitism—a belief in a single will. In June 633, he presented the Pact of Union, also known as the plerophoría of "Satisfactio," during a synod held in Alexandria. This agreement consisted of nine articles, with the seventh one boldly asserting monothelitism. Although the Miaphysites, also referred to as Theodosians or Severians, welcomed the pact, they maintained that Chalcedon should come to them rather than vice versa. During this time, numerous clergy, soldiers, and common people converted to Cyrus's position.

In 636, Cyrus attended another synod in Cyprus under Arkadios II, where he served as a moderator. He allowed opponents of Monothelitism to present their case to the Emperor. After receiving the Emperor's Monothelite response, known as the Ecthesis, Cyrus signed it in 637. However, the monothelete compromise ultimately proved ineffective. It was condemned at the Lateran Council of 649 and soon lost credibility, earning the derogatory name "enôsis hydrobaphès" or "washy union" in Medieval Greek.

For a period of ten years, Cyrus harshly persecuted the Egyptians, attempting to forcefully convert them to his brand of Christianity. However, the Christian majority accepted the authority of Pope Benjamin I, who was forced to go into hiding. Cyrus's troops captured Benjamin's brother, Mennas, subjecting him to brutal torture. According to Severus ibn al-Muqaffa, Mennas refused to renounce his faith. He was thrown into the sea where he drowned.

Cyrus appointed Chalcedonian bishops to govern every Egyptian city up to Ansena, and Coptic priests were put to death whenever discovered. Despite the absence of priests, the Coptic people continued to hold secret gatherings. One priest, Agathon, risked his life each night to administer communion in Alexandria. Later, he succeeded Benjamin as Pope. Some Copts made an attempt on Cyrus's life, but the plot was uncovered by Eudocianus, the brother of Domentianus, who was a general in the Muslim conquest of Egypt. The conspirators were summarily executed without trial.

== Military prefect ==
Since 538, the highest governmental rank in Egypt was dux et augustalis Alexandriae. Cyrus, in addition to being Patriarch, held immense secular power in Egypt and was often referred to by his contemporaries as the "governor of Egypt". However, it is unclear whether he held an official title such as dux et augustalis Alexandriae, or whether he derived this power by an imperial commission. Such a combination of secular and religious positions was contrary to ecclesiastical canons and extremely rare in Byzantine history.

During the period when Umar's general, 'Amr ibn al-'As, also known as Amru to the Romans, posed a threat to the Prefecture of Egypt, Cyrus was both the de facto governor of Egypt and the government-appointed Patriarch of Alexandria, (Note: The majority of Egypt's population was non-Chalcedonian and recognised Pope Benjamin I as their rightful Pope.) and Theodore was the commander-in-chief of the Byzantine army in the province. At this time, the governor of Faiyum was Domentianus (who was married to Cyrus' sister), while Theodosius was the prefect of its province, Arcadia Aegypti, and Anastasius was the prefect of Alexandria (and by extension the de jure governor of Egypt).

The defence of Arcadia Aegypti was entrusted to a certain John, whom Hermann Zotenberg identifies with the John, Duke of Barca or Barcaina mentioned by Nicephorus. (Note: According to Nicephorus, "While Heraclius was still in the East, he sent John, Duke of Barcaina, against the Saracens in Egypt. He joined battle with them and was himself killed.") He had brought the Ecthesis and a portion of the True Cross from Patriarch Sergius to Cyrus, and was likely on a direct commission from Emperor Heraclius.

Alfred J. Butler described Cyrus as having a "strange anxiety all through the war to hasten the submission of Egypt". For three years after the Muslim conquest of the Levant, Cyrus paid them tribute not to conquer Egypt. (Note: This is recounted by numerous ancient historians, including Nicephorus, Theophanes, Michael the Syrian, Severus, Agapius and Eutychius. However, Butler doubts that it happened.) When the Arabs entered Egypt and besieged Pelusium for two months, Cyrus did not react at all (although his daughter Armenousa may have sent reinforcements there). The city eventually fell in February 640.

=== Loss of Belbeis ===
After taking Pelusium, the Muslims marched on to Belbeis. Two Christian monks, (Note: According to Arabic legends, these were two bishops named Abu Miriam and Abu Maryam. Butler tenuously identifies them with two generals named Marinus and Marianus, mentioned by Nicephorus and Severus.) accompanied by Cyrus of Alexandria and the famous Roman general Aretion, came out to negotiate with 'Amr ibn al-'As. Aretion had been the Byzantine governor of Jerusalem, but had gone to Egypt shortly after losing the Battle of Ajnadayn. 'Amr gave them three options: convert to Islam, pay the jizya, or fight. They requested three days to reflect and then, according to Al-Tabari, requested two extra days.

At the end of the five days, Aretion, the two monks, and Armenousa decided to reject Islam and the jizya and fight the Muslims, thus disobeying Cyrus, who wanted to surrender and pay jizya. Cyrus left for the Babylon Fortress. The battle resulted in a Muslim victory during which Aretion was killed and Armenousa was captured, but sent back to Cyrus. 'Amr ibn al-'As subsequently attempted to convince the native Egyptians to aid the Arabs and surrender the city, based on the kinship between Egyptians and Arabs via Hajar. When the Egyptians refused, the siege resumed until the city fell around the end of March 640.

Cyrus was present at the siege of Babylon Fortress, where on 22 December 640 he negotiated a treaty with the Arabs involving the surrender of the Thebaid. According to Nikephoros, Cyrus even suggested giving one of Heraclius' daughters in marriage to Amr. The treaty was subject to the approval of the emperor Heraclius, but Cyrus stipulated that even if the emperor repudiated the treaty, he and the Egyptians, would honour its terms. Cyrus asked Heraclius to ratify the treaty and offered an argument in support. 'Amr submitted a detailed report to Umar recommending ratification. Upon hearing about this, Heraclius was furious and had Cyrus recalled to Constantinople. Cyrus tried to defend his actions, but Heraclius angrily threatened to kill him, calling him an abject coward and a heathen, and asking whether 100,000 Romans were a match for 12,000 barbarians. He then handed him to the urban prefect to humiliate him, and sent him to exile.

=== Summons to Constantinople ===
Heraclius died in February 641, two months before the fall of the Babylon Fortress, and was succeeded by his two sons Constantine III and Heraclonas as co-emperors. Heraclonas' mother, Martina, ruled through Heraclonas because of his young age and consistently opposed Constantine. Constantine, following his father's wishes, summoned Cyrus from exile and Theodore from Egypt to Constantinople to discuss the invasion. Cyrus was in favour of surrendering to the Muslims, whereas Theodore wanted to continue fighting them and hoped the Emperor would send reinforcements to Egypt. Constantine had been preparing a fleet to send to Egypt, but died on May 25 after a reign of just 100 days. With Heraclonas as sole emperor, Martina gained complete control over the government. She had Heraclonas give Cyrus express permission to make peace at any price with the Arabs, but also gave him reinforcements and a new general named Constantine to replace John. After Theodore and Cyrus' left for Egypt with reinforcements, Martina was deposed by Valentine, who sent envoys to Rhodes with a message to Cyrus' troops, telling them to return to Constantinople and not to side with Cyrus. He also sent a letter to Alexandria telling the defenders not to obey Martina, and to keep fighting. Theodore was pleased to hear this, and without telling Cyrus or anyone but the captain, he secretly attempted to sail from Rhodes to Pentapolis. (Note: It is unclear what Theodore's motives were. Butler suggests "He may have desired merely retirement and shelter from the coming storms; or he may have resolved, like Heraclius, to stake his fortune on a throw for the crown, and to found a new empire at Carthage; or he may have wished to gather resources and watch events, detesting the policy of surrender and hoping to strike a blow at the Muslims from Carthage.") However, the captain of the ship claimed the wind was contrary to him, and Theodore was stuck with Cyrus. They returned to Alexandria on September 14, 641, the Feast of the Cross.

Meanwhile, in Egypt, the governor Anastasius had been left in charge, and during his time the Muslims captured both Babylon and Nikiu. They had also begun their Siege of Alexandria.

=== Siege of Alexandria ===
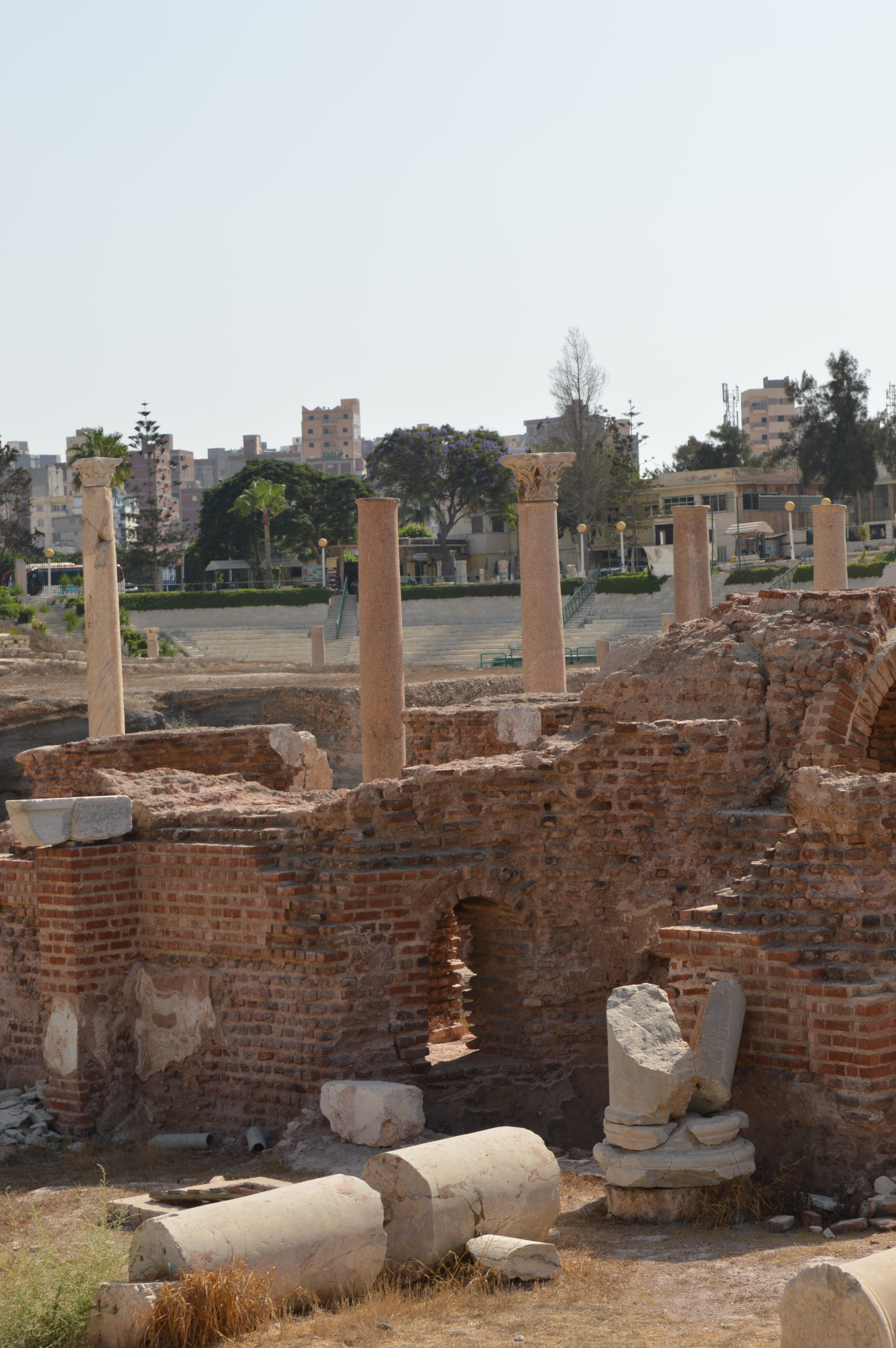
Remains of the Roman amphitheatre in Alexandria

When Theodore returned to Alexandria, he dismissed Domentianus as the military commander of the garrison and exiled him from the city, replacing him with Menas, who was a non-Chalcedonian Copt and popular with the army. Menas held a grudge against Domentianus' brother Eudocianus for Eudocianus' torture of the Coptic prisoners in Babylon. Theodore was angry with Domentianus for his cowardly flight from Nikiu and took Menas' side in their quarrel. Despite being brothers-in-law, Domentianus also disrespected Cyrus and showed him unreasonable hatred. He enlisted the Blues in Alexandria to his side, to which Menas responded by enlisting the Greens. There also came to Alexandria Philiades, prefect of the province of Faiyum and brother of Patriarch George I of Alexandria. Philiades was Menas' friend, but unlike Menas he was corrupt and unpopular, so much so that he was nearly lynched.

Since Theodore and Cyrus' arrival in Egypt was on September 14, 641, the Feast of the Cross, a great procession was organised from their landing place to Alexandria. Their entire path was covered in carpets, hymns were sung, and a piece of the True Cross which was earlier brought to Egypt by John, Duke of Barcaina, and stored in a church of the Theodosians, was carried with Cyrus and Theodore. The procession passed between Cleopatra's Needles and entered the Caesareum Church, where a liturgy was prayed. Cyrus then gave a sermon about the discovery of the True Cross, perhaps encouraging them to resist the siege in the name of the Cross, despite having already decided in himself to forsake the Cross and surrender to the Muslims.

Cyrus then went to Babylon to negotiate with 'Amr, and agreed the following treaty:

1. Payment of a fixed tribute by all who came under the treaty.
2. An armistice of about eleven months, to expire the first day of the Coptic month Paophi, i.e. September 28, 642.
3. During the armistice the Arab forces to maintain their positions, but to keep apart and undertake no military operations against Alexandria; the Roman forces to cease all acts of hostility.
4. The garrison of Alexandria and all troops there to embark and depart by sea, carrying all their possessions and treasure with them: but any Roman soldiers quitting Egypt by land to be subject to a monthly tribute on their journey.
5. No Roman army to return or attempt the recovery of Egypt.
6. The Muslims to desist from all seizure of churches, and not to interfere in any way with the Christians.
7. The Jews to be suffered to remain at Alexandria.
8. Hostages to be given by the Romans, viz. 150 military and 50 civilian, for the due execution of the treaty.

He then returned to Alexandria and reported the terms of this humiliating treaty to Theodore and Constantine, convincing them that it was necessary and telling them to report it to the Emperor Heraclonas, who ratified it in what may had been his last act as Emperor, as he was deposed in November. The local populace was not informed of it until an Arab army approached Alexandria to receive the tribute, and the Byzantine generals told the people not to resist. Realising what had happened, a furious mob attempted to stone Cyrus, but he said to them "I have made this treaty in order to save you and your children" and wept before them, which calmed the riot. The first installment of tribute was paid on 10 December 641, sealing the surrender of Alexandria.

== Death ==
After the siege was over, Cyrus negotiated with 'Amr to allow the Egyptians who had taken refuge in Alexandria during the war to return to their lands, but he apparently did not allow them to do so. Cyrus took the refusal deeply to heart, as it ruined his policy of gaining favour with the Copts. He had apparently hoped that, by co-operating with the Muslims, they would allow him to run Egypt independently of Constantinople. Instead, Amr put his rival, Pope Benjamin, in charge of the church in Egypt. Furthermore, he heard constant bad news from Constantinople: His allies Patriarch Pyrrhus, Martina and her sons had been deposed and banished. Valentine had attempted a second revolt, which failed, so to prove his loyalty to the Emperor Constans II he struck at anyone who could be in favour of Martina and Pyrrhus. He had the Archbishop of Cyprus, Arcadius, who was far more innocent than Cyrus, charged with treason. Cyrus was terrified that he would be summoned to Constantinople again to answer for his loss of Egypt and his notorious friendship with Martina and Pyrrhus.

Thus, wracked with guilt for losing Egypt, unable to reconcile with the Copts and undo his persecution of them, and with his ambitions shattered, Cyrus fell into depression during the last few months of his life. John of Nikiu describes his death twice, in one passage saying that he simply died of natural causes, but explaining in another that, "owing to excessive grief", he caught dysentery on Palm Sunday, and died of it on Holy Thursday, March 21 642. A later legend, related by Severus, claims that he committed suicide by licking a poisoned signet ring.

He was replaced as Patriarch by Peter IV on 14 July. Theodore arranged the withdrawal of Byzantine forces from Alexandria. On September 17, 642, he left Egypt and set sail for Cyprus with the last Roman troops. Then on September 29, the 11 months of armistice ended, and 'Amr marched at the head of his Arab army into Alexandria, thus marking the end of Roman Egypt after 671 years.

== Writings ==
Cyrus communicated with Sergius through three letters, known as the "Satisfactio," which have been preserved in the acts of the Roman Synod of the Lateran and the Sixth Ecumenical Council (Mansi, X, 1004; XI, 560, 562, 964).

In the first letter, Cyrus expressed his acceptance of the Ecthesis. The second letter described his dilemma between Pope Leo and Sergius, while the third letter narrated the conversion of the Theodosians.

Cyrus faced opposition from St. Sophronius, who died in 638 (Epistola synodica, Mansi, XI, 480), and St. Maximus, who died in 662 (Epistola ad Nicandrum; disputatio cum Pyrrho, P.G., XCI, 101, 345). They accused him of tempering with the revered text of Dionysius and introducing alterations. They also refuted his claim of support from the Church Fathers and explained that while the divine and human natures of Christ are referred to as one because they belong to the same person and work in harmony, they cannot be physically identified, as they have distinct origins. Historians hold differing opinions on how Cyrus adopted these views. Some believe he had a predisposition towards Monophysitism from the beginning, while others argue that he was influenced by Sergius and Heraclius.

Posthumously, Cyrus was condemned as a heretic at the Lateran Council of 649 and again in 680 at the Third Ecumenical Council of Constantinople.

There are letters associated with Prophet Muhammad sent a letter to Al-Muqawqis, the ruler of Egypt widely identified with Cyrus of Alexandria, inviting him to embrace Islam. Carried by the envoy Ḥātib ibn Abī Baltaʿah around 628 CE, the epistle pledged protection for the Christian community and bore Muhammad’s seal of prophethood. Although no original seventh-century manuscript survives, copies purportedly discovered in an Akhmīm monastery were acquired by Sultan ʿAbdülmecid I and now reside in the Topkapı Palace’s Holy Relics collection in Istanbul.

Al-Muqawqis replied courteously but declined conversion, returning gifts including two Coptic women—Maria al-Qibṭiyya, who became Muhammad’s wife, and her sister Sirīn—alongside fine textiles and a mule.

== Sources ==
- "Cyrus (631–641)". Official web site of the Greek Orthodox Patriarchate of Alexandria and All Africa.
- Jones, A. H. M.; Martindale, J. R; Morris, John (1992). The Prosopography of the Later Roman Empire. Vol. III: A.D. 527–641. Oxford University Press. ISBN 978-0-521-20160-5.
- Meyendorff, John (1989). Imperial unity and Christian divisions: The Church, AD 450–680. St. Vladimir's Seminary Press. ISBN 978-0881410556.
