= Peter IV of Alexandria =

Peter IV of Alexandria may refer to:

- Pope Peter IV of Alexandria, ruled in 565–569
- Patriarch Peter IV of Alexandria, Greek Patriarch of Alexandria in 643–651
