= Arkadios II of Cyprus =

Cypriot archbishop from 634 to 643

Archbishop Arkadios II (Greek: Ἀρκάδιος Β'; died 643) was the head of the Church of Cyprus during the 630s. He was a supporter of the Monoenergism formula put forward by Patriarch Sergius I of Constantinople, and Emperor Heraclius.

Arkadios wrote an epistle supporting Monoenergism and disparaging its opponents, of which the chief was Sophronius of Jerusalem. When Sophronius became patriarch in 634, Sophronius sent a letter to Arkadios requesting him to call a synod. Arkadios invited Cyrus of Alexandria, as well as Sergius and Honorius. Kyros arrived himself, as did representatives of Constantinople and Rome. Then Arkadios invited Sophronius. Sophronius and his protégé Maximus the Confessor each sent representatives of their own.

When the Jerusalmite delegation arrived, Arkadios received the guests with honor. The next morning, all 46 of the dignitaries haggled over the details. The anti-Monoenergists agreed upon a common letter, but Arkadios declared its suggestions to be anathema. Sophronius asked him, "What then do you want – that this should reach the emperor?" Arkadius retorted, "It is because of your lack of belief, and because of the false doctrine you and your companions hold, in that you resist the truth [of Monoenergism]". Cyrus then cut the debate short and ordered Sophronius to issue a letter to Emperor Heraclius.

Heraclius promptly replaced Monoenergism with Monothelitism and issued an edict to all the metropolitan sees (probably the Ecthesis). When this edict arrived in Cyprus, Arkadios added his signature to the list.

== Writings ==
- Epistle on Monothelitism Lost.

Preceded by Plutarch	Archbishop of Cyprus; 630–643	Succeeded by Sergios
