= Patriarch Peter IV of Alexandria =

Greek Patriarch of Alexandria in 643–651

Peter IV served as Greek Patriarch of Alexandria from 642 to 651. Following the Muslim conquest of Egypt, he sought refuge in Constantinople.

In Constantinople he attended the Sixth Ecumenical Council for which he signed the council's records. Peter's departure from Alexandria initiated a period in Alexandria referred to as the Coadjutoration of the Patriarchal Throne, generally during which those bishops, as coadjutors, of the Church of Alexandria remained resident in Constantinople. This period lasted until Patriarch Cosmas I was enthroned in 727.

Preceded by Cyrus	Greek Patriarch of Alexandria; 643–651	Succeeded by Theodore II
