= Patriarch George I of Alexandria =

7th-century Greek Patriarch of Alexandria

George I served as Greek Patriarch of Alexandria between 621 and 631, succeeding St. John the Almsgiver. A biography of St. John Chrysostom, reviewed by St. Photios in his Myriobiblos, has been attributed to him, as well as fragments on Psalm 2.

Preceded by John V	Greek Patriarch of Alexandria; 621–631	Succeeded by Cyrus
