= Sergius I of Constantinople =

Ecumenical Patriarch of Constantinople from 610 to 638

- Ecumenical Patriarch of Constantinople
- Installed: 18 April 610
- Term ended: 9 December 638
- Predecessor: Thomas I of Constantinople
- Successor: Pyrrhus I of Constantinople

Personal details
- Died: 9 December 638 Constantinople
- Denomination: Chalcedonian Christianity

Sergius I of Constantinople (Greek: Σέργιος, Sergios; died 9 December 638) was the Ecumenical Patriarch of Constantinople from 610 to 638. He is most famous for promoting Monothelitism Christianity, especially through the Ecthesis.

Sergius I was born of Syrian Jacobite heritage. He first came to power as Ecumenical Patriarch of Constantinople in 610. He was also a known supporter of Emperor Heraclius, crowning Heraclius as emperor himself in 610. Sergius I also provided support to Heraclius throughout his campaign against the Persians. Sergius I also played a prominent role in the defense of Constantinople against the combined Avar-Persian-Slavic forces during their invasion of Constantinople in 626. Sergius I's connections to both political and religious authorities gave him to his influence in both the religious and political communities to further Monoenergism as the primary formula of Christ within the church. This was met with much opposition, especially from that of the Chalcedonian supporters, Maximus the Confessor and Sophronius of Jerusalem. In response to their resistance to accept the ideas of Monoenergism, Sergius I responded with the Ecthesis, a formula which forbade discussing the idea that the Person of Christ had one or two energies in favour of Monothelitism being the idea that the Person of Christ had two natures that were united by a single will. The Ecthesis was signed by Heraclius in 638, the same year that Sergius I died.

The Ecthesis would only be seen as an accepted doctrine for two years; the death of Pope Honorius I resulted in a significant reduction in Monothelitism support. The Ecthesis was condemned in 640 by Pope John IV. Additionally, both Sergius I and Pope Honorius I were condemned as heretics by the church in 680–681 by the Third Council of Constantinople.

== Early career ==
Very little is known about Sergius I before his election to the patriarchate of Constantinople. His parents were Syrian Jacobites and it is not known how or when he arrived in Constantinople. At the time of his election he was a deacon at the Hagia Sophia and feeder of the poor (πτωχοτρόφος) at the Phrixos harbour. While his birth date is unknown contemporaries remarked that he was young for his new position.

Sergius I was elected as patriarch of Constantinople on 18 April 610. At that time emperor Phocas was fighting a rebellion led by the Exarchate of Africa, general Heraclius the Elder, and his son Heraclius. In October 610 Heraclius the Younger took the capital and Phocas was executed. Sergius I crowned the new emperor Heraclius and his wife Fabia Eudokia and blessed their marriage on 5 October 610. Later he also baptised and crowned their children Eudoxia Epiphania (born 7 July 611) and Heraclius Constantine (born 3 May 612).

In 612 Sergius I introduced new limitations on the number of clerics at the Hagia Sophia. Additional appointments would only be made if the candidate made or secured a significant financial donation that would cover all costs for his position (and possibly more). This new policy reduced the strain on state resources and was ratified by Heraclius in May 612. It is unknown whether the initiative for this policy came from Sergius I himself or from emperor.

When the emperor's wife Fabia Eudokia died on 13 August 612, Heraclius decided to marry his niece Martina. Sergius I tried to convince the emperor not to go ahead with a marriage that was against the rules of the Church and would be unpopular. Heraclius acknowledged the problem, but decided to marry her anyway, writing to Sergius I that the latter had done his duty "as patriarch and as a friend". It seems that Sergius I did not resist any further and he blessed the marriage and crowned Martina as new empress. It is possible that given the precarious state of the empire – the Byzantine army under General Heraclius had just suffered a major defeat against the Persians at Antioch in 613 – Sergius I chose to put unity and cooperation with the emperor above the church canon. A year later he baptised the couple's son Heraclius Constantine. As such, Sergius I developed a close relationship with the Emperor, a connection that would serve him later on.

In 614, the Persian army seised Jerusalem, damaging the Church of the Holy Sepulchre in the process and capturing the True Cross, originally discovered by the Empress Helena. The fall of Jerusalem and the loss of the True Cross came as a shock and led to a crusading mood among the empire's populace. Attempts at negotiating a peace failed.

In 618 emperor Heraclius decided to move the capital of the empire from Constantinople to Carthage. At the time Constantinople was threatened both by the Avars and the Persians. At the same time Constantinople was hit by a famine, caused by the loss of Egypt which was the primary source of Constantinople's grain imports, followed by an outbreak of the plague. Believing that under these conditions Constantinople was no adequate base for a counteroffensive, Heraclius began to secretly move the empire's gold and financial reserves to Carthage. When the secret plan to move the capital was discovered, protests erupted in Constantinople and Sergius I succeeded at convincing Heraclius to give up his plans and to swear an oath in the Hagia Sophia never to abandon Constantinople. It is likely that Sergius promised Heraclius financial aid from the church in return for his oath. Henceforth Sergius I was credited with saving the capital, gaining him significant popularity amongst the populace of Constantinople.

In 619 the 612 reforms of the clergy of the Hagia Sophia ran into "difficulties". This threatened the reduction of the strain on state finances that were the goal of the reform. Heraclius gave Sergius I free rein in solving the problem.

A counterattack was initiated against the Persians in 622 by Heraclius. Sergius I provided the necessary wealth for the campaign to succeed through the funds of the church. Sergius succeeded at this by reporting funds in the form of Church revenues and vessels. It is even said that the bronze ox from the Forum Tauri was melted down to help provide materials for coinage. On the second day of Easter (5 April) 622, after a festive mass, Heraclius set out to attack the Persians. In his absence government rested with his son and co-emperor Heraclius Constantine. Since the latter was still a minor, Heraclius left him under the supervision and regency of Sergius and the Patrikios Bonus. While it is likely that the main executive power rested with Bonus, Sergius I probably played a leading role in discussions.

== Siege of Constantinople ==
In June 626 Persian troops appeared before Chalcedon, making camp in expectation of the Avar army. With Heraclius away on his campaign against Sassanid Persia, Sergius I and Bonus seem to have considered sending the emperor's son Heraclius Constantine to his father for assistance. Ultimately they decided that the emperor and the co-emperor should not both be absent during the crisis and instead sent a message to the emperor. Heraclius, however, was unwilling to abandon his campaign and merely sent instructions for the defense of the city. On 29 June the Avar vanguard reached Adrianople. An attempt at negotiations with the Avar Khagan failed and the main army reached Constantinople on 29 July.

By 622, Sergius I's abilities were well recognized by Heraclius. As a result, Heraclius assigned Sergius the care of both his son Theotokos and Constantinople. In 626 during the absence of the Emperor's campaign against Sassanid Persia, the Avars and Sassanid Persians, aided by large number of allied Slavs, laid siege to Constantinople. Along with the magister militum Bonus, he had been named regent and was in charge of the city's defense. He led a litany to the Hodegetria icon just before the final attack of the Avars, and right after completing it a huge storm crushed the invading fleet, saving Constantinople. It is reported that Sergius I carried the Icon of the Mother of God around the city walls of Constantinople. The storm was credited as a miracle from the Mother of God, though Sergius I was credited with persuading her to the point of involvement. It was rumoured that a previous hymn of the Eastern Orthodox Church was composed in honour of this battle and of Sergius I.

== Monothelitism ==
=== Background ===
With the victory over the Persians, rifts in the religious society began to emerge again between Monophysite and Chalcedonian beliefs. Both Heraclius and Sergius I planned to adopt a form of "Monoenergism". The hope was that their religious formula would be able to connect the different religious beliefs and provide a sense of unity within the empire.

Sergius I promulgated the belief that Jesus Christ had two natures but one will, known as Monothelitism. It was hoped that the idea would appeal to both Chalcedonians and to Monophysite followers in the empire as it fused basic principles taken from both realms of practice. Initially, Sergius I had success, converting the Patriarch of Alexandria, Cyrus of Alexandria, and the Patriarch of Antioch. It was not until 633 that Heraclius's Monoenergism began to receive resistance from the Chaldeconians, primarily from the monks Sophronius of Jerusalem and Maximus the Confessor. In 633, Sophronius had left for Africa to dispute the doctrine that Cyrus has put upon the Egyptians. To this end, Sergius I sent his archdeacon Peter to a synod in Cyprus in 634, hosted by Archbishop Arkadios II of Cyprus and with additional representatives from Pope Honorius I. The anti-monoenergist side in Jerusalem, championed by Maximus and Sophronius, sent to this synod Anastasius Apocrisiarius pupil of Maximus, George of Resh'aina pupil of Sophronius, and two of George's own pupils, and also eight bishops from Palestine. When the two sides were presented to the emperor, the emperor switched to Monothelitism and so with Sergius I.

It was also at this point around 633 that Sergius I sought to stress the importance of Monothelitism to Pope Honorius I. Sergius I's letter to Honorius informed the Pope of the significance of the union achieved in Alexandria and for an agreement in how Christ's will should be viewed. Honorius I ultimately agreed with Sergius I's belief, impressed at Sergius I's ability to gain theological agreement in the eastern Churches, and confessed to Christ having only one will but two natures as well in his reply to Sergius I. Honorius I retracts from this position to a degree in a following letter to Sergius I, believed to be a result of the Synodical Letter from Sophronius to Honorius I.

=== The Ecthesis ===
Sergius I sought to create a formula that would be able to fully please both the Chalcedonians and the Monophysites. The eventually forbade discussion on whether Christ had one or two energies within him and instead insisted that the Lord had two different natures incarnated within a single will and body. Sergius I would lead to call this statement the Ecthesis, or Exposition. These beliefs were in similar accordance to the beliefs of Hominus. This furthered Sergius I's formula in realms of both Chalcedonian and Monophysite practice. It can be argued that Hominus did not quite understand the point of Sergius I's formula, but it is accepted that he supported it regardless. Still, the Ecthesis was not well received by all Chalcedonians; Sophronius of Jerusalem viewed it poorly, to the point that he published a decree against it. Emperor Heraclius too was hesitant to sign off on Sergius I's work. While Sergius I had finished the Ecthesis in 636, it was not signed into approval by Heraclius until 638, the same year as Sergius I's death.

The Ecthesis of 638 AD was issued by Emperor Heraclius with the agreement of Sergius I. This document defined Monothelitism as the official imperial form of Christianity, and it would remain very controversial in the next years after its implementation.

=== Effects of the Ecthesis ===
The initial effects of the Ecthesis were strongly felt throughout religious society. Sergius I's successor, Pyrrhus of Constantinople, who Sergius I had handpicked to take over, declared his confidence in Monothelitism belief as the official imperial doctrine. Furthermore, the majority of the subsequent Eastern successors were of Monophysite faith, furthering the spread of Monothelitism doctrine. Chalcedonian belief had been severely reduced and the remainder of its practice was in a critical state. This would all change the following year in a very contrasting way.

=== Death and denunciation ===
Sergius I died in December of 638, only months after Heraclius had instated the Ecthesis.

Despite the strong initial spread to Monothelitism belief, 640 brought an abrupt end to this. A series of events happened in short order following 638. First, the new pope, Pope Severinus, showed strong resistance to accepting Monothelitism belief. His successor, Pope John IV, was an even stronger opponent of the practice. Finally, following the death of Heraclius in 641, both the subsequent Emperors Constantine III and Constans II were of orthodox practice and appeared to have removed the Ecthesis as the official imperial doctrine, by request of Pope John IV. This effectively crushed the remaining foundation of Monothelitism doctrine as Orthodox teachings appeared to quickly restore back throughout the Empire.

By 680, all Monothelite support had faded and Orthodox belief was in full order again. The resulting Roman Easter synod of 680 concluded that Christ had two wills and that all who had opposed this belief were to be condemned as heretics. Monothelitism was finally declared a heresy at the Third Council of Constantinople (the Sixth Ecumenical Council), 680–681 AD, and both Patriarch Sergius I and Pope Honorius I were declared to be heretics. Honorius I remains the only condemned pope to this day. As quoted from the council: "...Honorius some time Pope of Old Rome, as well as the letter of the latter to the same Sergius, we find that these documents are quite foreign to the apostolic dogmas, to the declarations of the holy Councils, and to all the accepted Fathers, and that they follow the false teachings of the heretics..."

The Council lasted a total of eighteen sessions in declaring the heresy of Sergius, the first being in November 680 and the last being in September 681.

== Bibliography ==
- Alexander, Suzanne Spain; "Heraclius, Byzantine Imperial Ideology, and the David Plates", Speculum, 52.2 (1977), 218–222.
- Allen, Pauline; Bronwen, Neil (2003). Maximus the Confessor and his Companions. Oxford Early Christian Texts. Oxford University Press. ISBN 9780198299912.
- Brock, Sebastian P., "An Early Syriac Life of Maximus the Confessor", Analecta Bollandiana 91 (1973), 299–346.
- Dieten, Jan Louis van (1972). Geschichte der Patriarchen von Sergios I bis Johannes VI (610–715) [History of the Patriarchs from Sergios I to John VI (610–715)] (in German). Amsterdam: Verlag Adolf M. Hakkert. ISBN 90-256-0604-0.
- Ekonomou, Andrew J. (2007). Byzantine Rome and the Greek Popes - Eastern Influences on Rome and the Papacy from Gregory the Great to Zacharias, 590–752 AD. Lexington Books. ISBN 9780739119778.
- Hovorun, Cyril (2008). Will, Action and Freedom - Christological Controversies in the Seventh Century. Leiden-Boston: Brill Publishers. ISBN 978-9004166660.
- Hussey, J. M.; The Orthodox Church in the Byzantine Empire, 1, Oxford, Oxford University Press, 1986.
- L. and C., Concilia, Tom; "The Sentence Against the Monothelites - Session XIII", NPNF2-14, The Seven Ecumenical Councils 680, col. 943, Christian Classics Ethereal Library, 16 October 2013, http://www.ccel.org/ccel/schaff/npnf214.
- Louth, Andrew; Maximus the Confessor, 1, London, Taylor & Francis, 2005, 7–16.
- Meyendorff, John (1989). Imperial unity and Christian divisions - The Church 450–680 A.D. The Church in history. Vol. 2. Crestwood, NY: Saint Vladimir's Orthodox Theological Seminary. ISBN 978-0-88-141056-3.
- Rose, Hugh James; A New General Biographical Dictionary, Volume 12, London, Bell & Co., Cambridge, 1857, 8.
- Runciman, Steven; The Byzantine Theocracy - The Weil Lectures, Cincinnati, Cambridge, Cambridge University Press, 1977, 54–61.
- Ullmann, Walter; A Short History of the Papacy in the Middle Ages, 2, New Fetter Lane, London, Methuen Publishing, 1972.
- Vauchez, André; Encyclopedia of the Middle Ages, 2012, Cambridge, Britain, James Clarke & Co, 2002, http://www.oxfordreference.com/view/10.1093/acref/9780227679319.001.0001/acref.

Titles of Chalcedonian Christianity
Preceded by Thomas I	Ecumenical Patriarch of Constantinople; 610 – 638	Succeeded by Pyrrhus I
