= Ecthesis =

Letter written by Heraclius

The Ecthesis (Greek: Ἔκθεσις) is a letter published in 638 CE by the Byzantine emperor Heraclius which defined monotheletism as the official imperial form of Christianity.

== Background ==
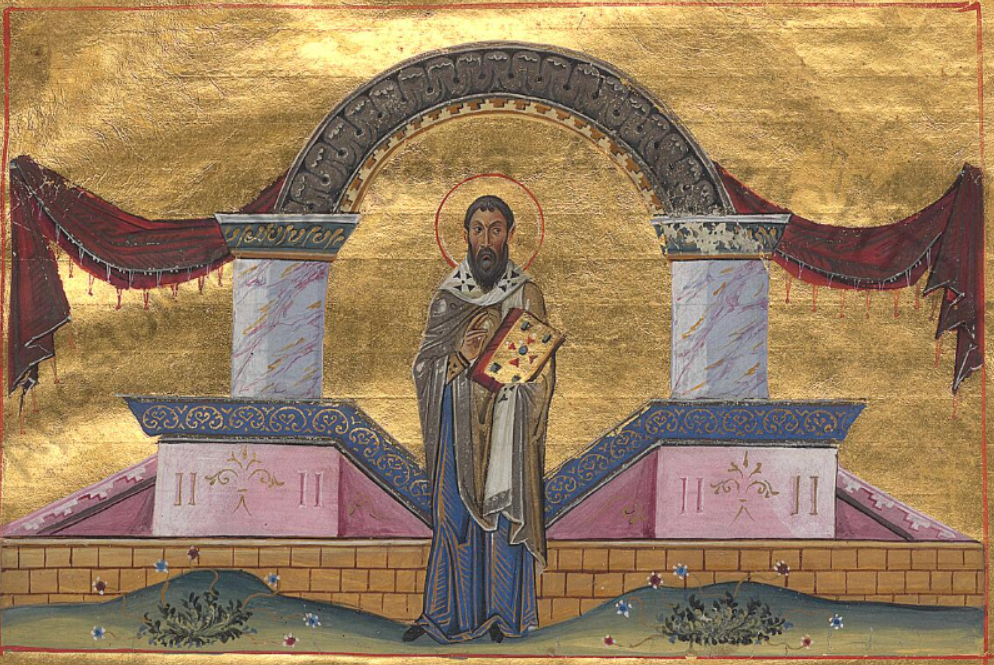
Sophronius of Jerusalem was instrumental in overturning Patriarch Sergius' first attempt at solving the monophysite question.

The Ecthesis was another attempt by the Byzantine emperors to heal the schism in the Christian Church over the nature of Jesus Christ. In 451 the Council of Chalcedon had ruled that Christ did not possess one divine nature, but instead possessed two distinct natures, one fully divine and one fully human, with both acting in harmony together. This ruling was consistently rejected by the Non-Chalcedonians, who were against the idea of the two natures, maintaining that the humanity and divinity of Christ were united in one nature. Throughout the 6th century, the Byzantine Emperors either covertly encouraged this group (Anastasius I), or actively persecuted them (Justin II).

By the beginning of the 7th century, the court and the religious hierarchy at Constantinople were by and large firmly in the Chalcedonian camp. However, this put them at odds with the majority Non-Chalcedonians in Egypt, Syria, Mesopotamia and Armenia. Such a division was dangerous in an empire that was under threat from the Persian Sassanids, especially as the Non-Chalcedonians considered their schismatic brethren to be more of a threat than any foreign invader. Consequently, the emperors at Constantinople were always seeking some method of rapprochement to heal the breach in the church, and thereby prevent the empire's enemies from taking advantage of the internal divisions.

With the reign of Heraclius, he and the Patriarch Sergius had attempted to find common ground between the Chalcedonians and the Non-Chalcedonians by issuing the doctrine of the single energy of Christ during the mid 630s. It did gain some acceptance initially, with Pope Honorius I giving his written assent, though it is clear that he considered the problem one of terminology, not theology. However, this compromise position was firmly opposed by the Patriarch of Jerusalem, Sophronius, and the doctrine was repudiated at the synod of Cyprus.

== Release of the Ecthesis ==
Yet Patriarch Sergius refused to give in, and in 638 he and Heraclius released a slightly amended formula, called the Ecthesis. In this revision, the question of the energy of Christ was not relevant. Instead, it promoted the belief that while Christ possessed two natures, he had only a single will. This notion of Monotheletism, the Doctrine of the Single Will as proscribed in the Ecthesis was sent as an edict to all four eastern metropolitan sees. A copy was posted in the narthex of Hagia Sophia, and when Sergius died in December 638, it looked as if Heraclius might actually achieve his goal, with the eastern patriarchs agreeing to the formula, and gaining many adherents across the east, including Cyrus of Alexandria and Arkadios II of Cyprus.

But during 638 in Rome, Pope Honorius I who was thought by many to have supported monothelitism died. His successor Pope Severinus condemned the Ecthesis outright, and so was forbidden his seat until 640. His successor Pope John IV also rejected the doctrine completely, leading to a major schism between the eastern and western halves of the orthodox church. When news reach Heraclius of the Pope's condemnation, he was already old and ill, and the news only hastened his death, declaring with his dying breath that the controversy was all due to Sergius, and that the Patriarch had pressured him to give his unwilling approval to the Ecthesis.

== Aftermath ==
This was the final attempt to win over the Non-Chalcedonians to union with the Chalcedonians by means of a theological compromise. The areas that were largely Non-Chalcedonian were soon overrun by the Islamic armies that poured in from the sands of Arabia in 634. The new conquerors allowed the Non-Chalcedonians to practice their faith in peace, which suited them since they no longer had the need to bend their beliefs to the Byzantine hierarchy (but they still had to provide the jizya). Since the areas that remained to the empire were largely Chalcedonian, the need to reach a theological compromise soon disappeared.

Yet the Byzantine emperors were still not finished with the doctrine of Monotheletism. Constans II, the grandson of Heraclius was not a supporter of Monotheletism, and was determined to end the dispute with the west. Consequently, he ordered that all discussion about the Monothelite doctrine was to cease and that all theological positions were to be as before the Monothelite controversy erupted, issuing his Typos in 648 to this effect. This directive was ignored in the west, as the Ecthesis was condemned by the Lateran Council of 649. This infuriated emperor Constans who ordered the arrest and trials of Pope Martin I and Maximus the Confessor. The persecutions of the zealous prosecutors only ended with the death of Constans in 668, and Monothelitism was officially condemned at the Third Council of Constantinople (the Sixth Ecumenical Council, 680–681) in favor of Dyothelitism, which put to rest the issue of the Ecthesis.

== See also ==
- Essence–energies distinction
- Miaphysitism
- Monoenergism
- Monothelitism
- Typos of Constans

== Sources ==
- Herbermann, Charles, ed. (1913). "Monothelitism and Monothelites" . Catholic Encyclopedia. New York: Robert Appleton Company.
- Bury, John B., A history of the later Roman empire from Arcadius to Irene, Volume 2 (1889) [2005]
- Norwich, John J., Byzantium: The Early Centuries (1988) [1990]
- Ostrogorsky, George (1956). History of the Byzantine State. Oxford: Basil Blackwell.
- Meyendorff, John (1989). Imperial unity and Christian divisions: The Church 450-680 A.D. The Church in history. Vol. 2. Crestwood, NY: St. Vladimir's Seminary Press. ISBN 9780881410563.
- Hovorun, Cyril (2008). Will, Action and Freedom: Christological Controversies in the Seventh Century. Leiden-Boston: BRILL. ISBN 978-9004166660.
