= Babylon Fortress =

Ancient Roman fortress near Old Cairo, Egypt

Babylon
- ⲡⲁⲃⲓⲗⲱⲛ (Coptic)
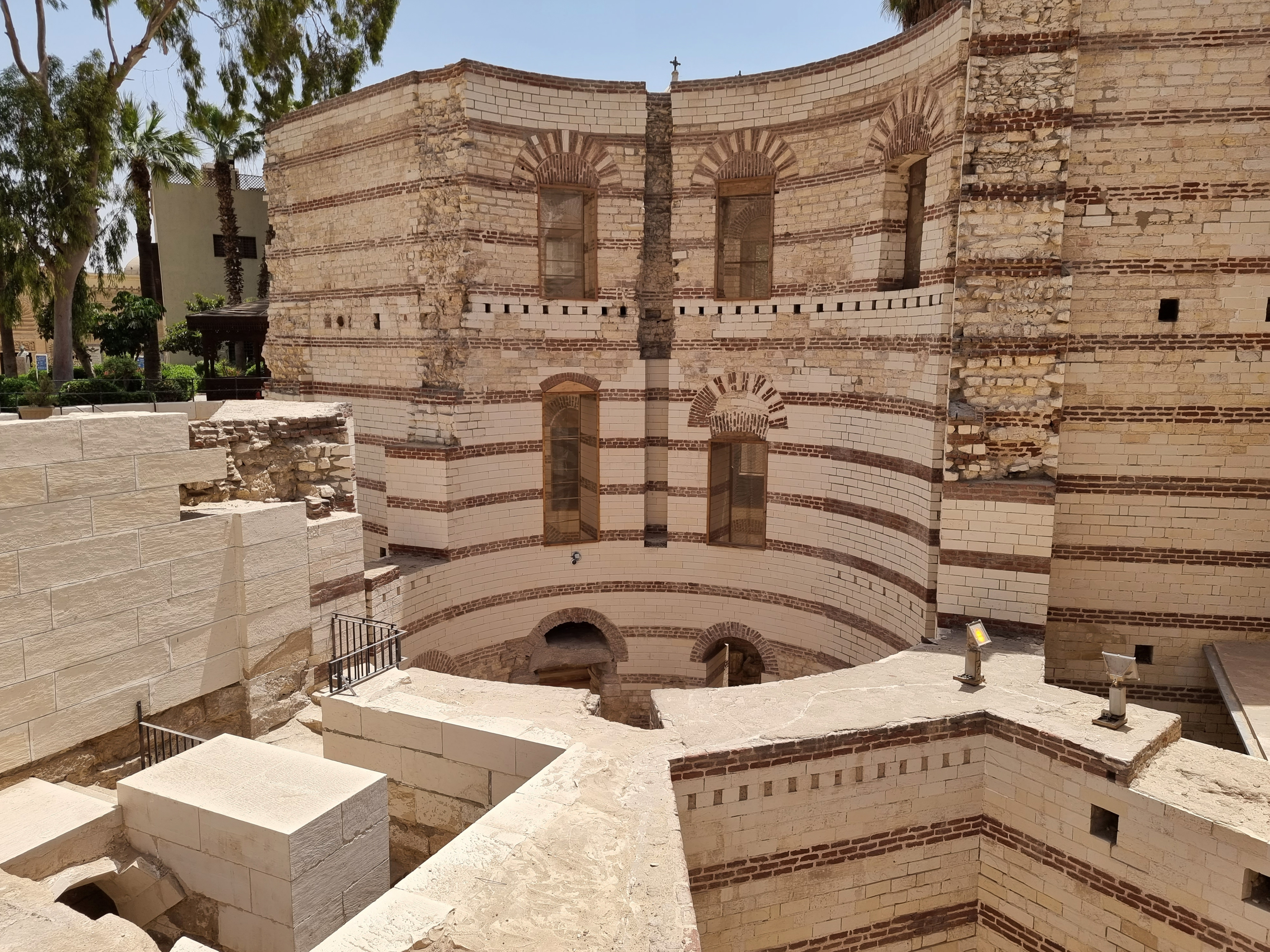
- Remains of one of the two towers guarding the Roman canal

- Location within Egypt
- 30°0′22″N 31°13′47″E
- Location: Cairo Governorate, Egypt
- Region: Lower Egypt

Babylon Fortress (Arabic: حصن بابليون; Coptic: ⲡⲁⲃⲓⲗⲱⲛ or Ⲃⲁⲃⲩⲗⲱⲛ) is an ancient Roman fortress on the eastern bank of the Nile Delta, located in the area known today as Old Cairo or Coptic Cairo. The fortress was built circa 300 AD by Emperor Diocletian in order to protect the entrance to an ancient canal, previously rebuilt by Trajan, that linked the Nile with the Red Sea.

It was at the boundary between Lower and Middle Egypt, where the river craft paid tolls when ascending or descending the Nile. Within the fortress's former enclosure are the present-day Coptic Museum, a convent, and several churches, including the Church of St. George and the Hanging Church.

== Name ==
T28 D34 O49
ẖrj ꜥḥꜣ (Kheriaha)
in hieroglyphs
Era: Old Kingdom
(2686–2181 BC)

O1 Z1 V28 D36 Q3 N36 N35 O28 W24 O49
pr ḥꜥpj n wn (Perhabinon)
in hieroglyphs

According to the 7th-century writer John of Nikiu, the name "Babylon" was given by Nebuchadnezzar II, the second king of the Neo-Babylonian Empire, who conquered or campaigned in the area circa 568 BC. He named it after his own home city, Babylon, which was the dominant city of Mesopotamia. According to Egyptologists, the ancient name of the site was Kheriaha, although Spiegelberg derives the modern Babylon name from Perhabinon.

== Situation ==
Babylon lay northeast of Memphis, on the east bank of the Nile, and near the commencement of the Canal of the Pharaohs connecting the Nile to the Red Sea. It was the boundary town between Lower and Middle Egypt, where the river craft paid tolls when ascending or descending the Nile.

== History ==
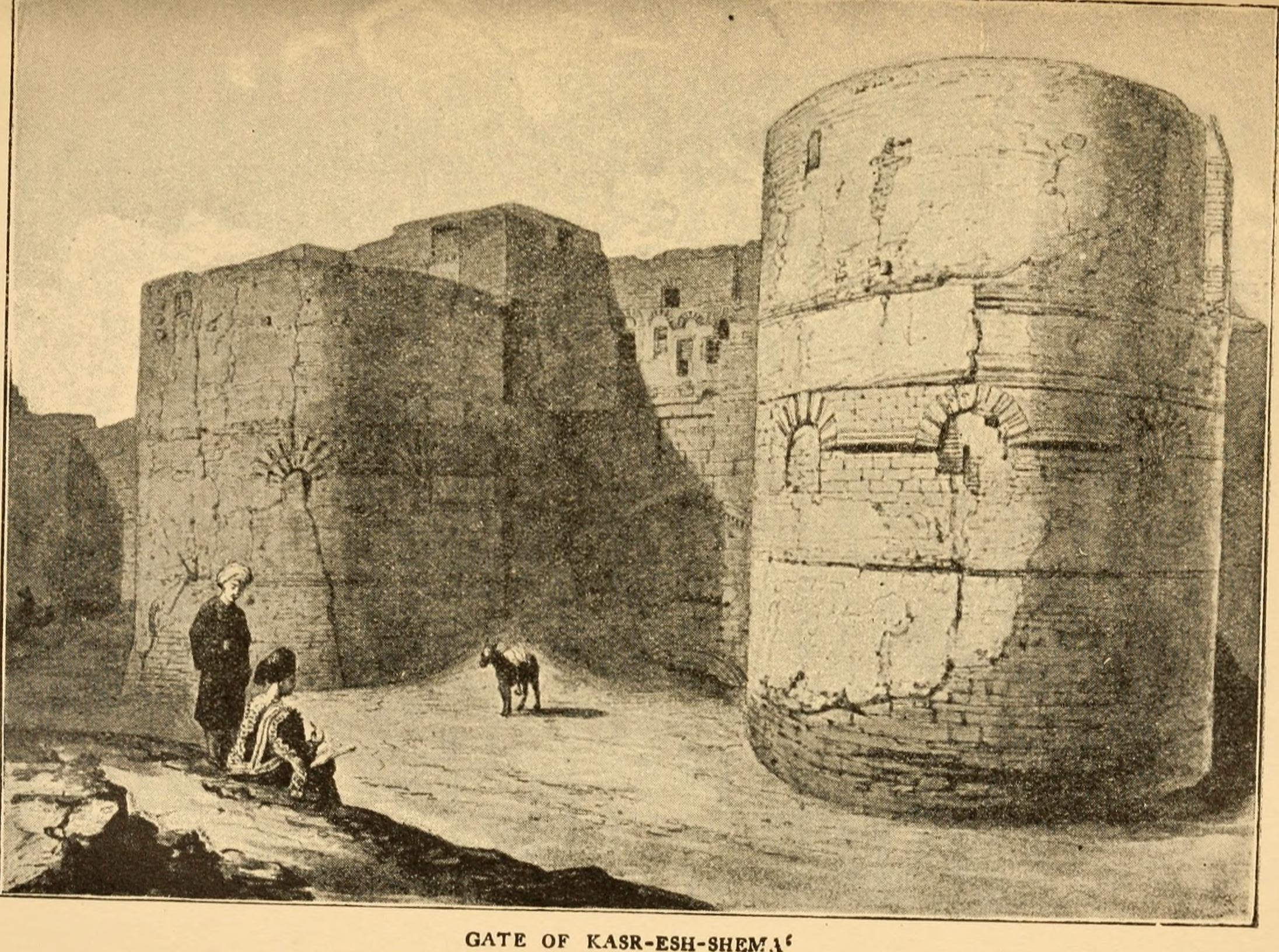
The south gate of Babylon Fortress in a 19th-century illustration

Some historical sources, such as John of Nikiu, report that a fortress named Babylon was first founded by Nebuchadnezzar II circa 568 BC, at the site where an ancient Egyptian canal linked the Nile with the Red Sea. During an uprising, Babylonian prisoners established a stronghold between Memphis and Heliopolis, on an elevation on the east bank of the Nile. The canal was re-dug by the Persian king Darius (r. 521–486 BC).

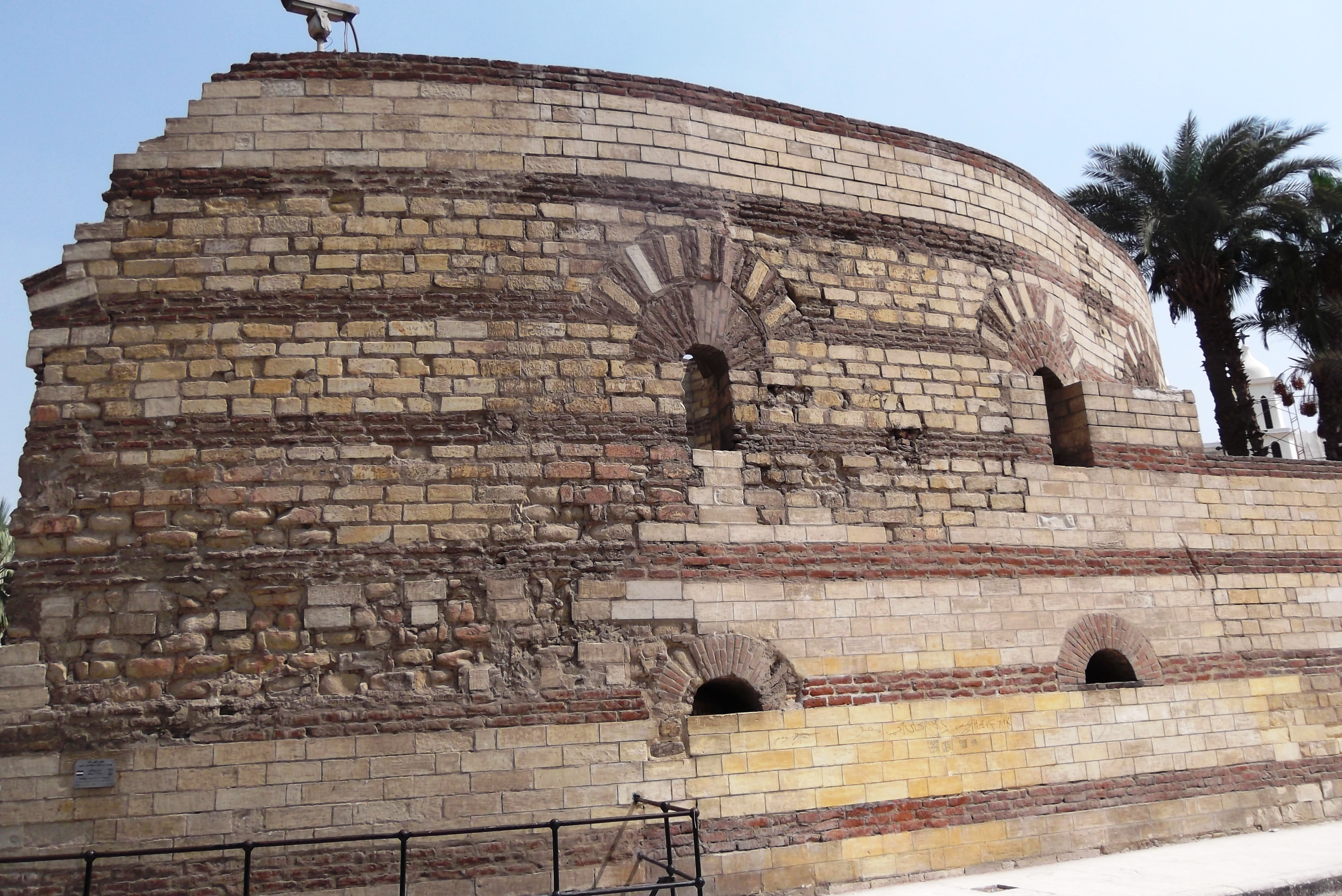
Exterior of one of the two round towers that flanked the entrance to Trajan's canal

The fortress's origins are often associated with Trajan (r. 98–117), who created the Amnis Traianus, a reconstruction of the Red Sea canal that had fallen out of use. Trajan reportedly moved the mouth of the canal further south from its former location, to the site of what is now Old Cairo, where he also constructed a fortified harbor. The construction of the present Babylon Fortress (whose remains are visible today) has been attributed by more recent archeological research to the reign of Diocletian (r. 285–305), who expanded the fortifications at the mouth of the canal around 300 AD. The large new fortress, probably made necessary after the Crisis of the Third Century, provided a considerable defense for both the land and sea routes in the region. The canal passed between two massive round towers and ran through the middle of the fortress. In later centuries, a wall was built between the two large towers to block the canal.

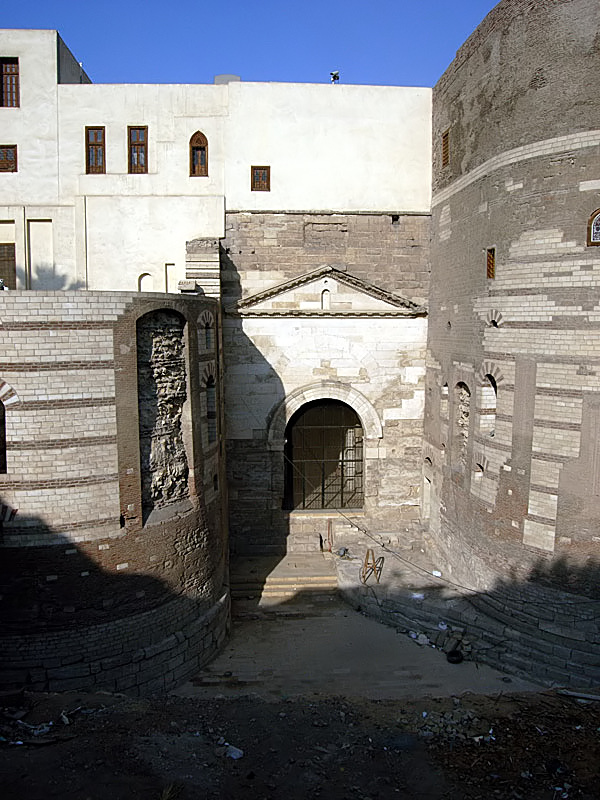
The south gate of Babylon Fortress (2007 photo), over which the Hanging Church stands today

The town was the seat of a Christian bishopric, a suffragan of Leontopolis, the capital and metropolitan see of the Roman province of Augustamnica Secunda. The names of several of its bishops are recorded. After the Council of Chalcedon (451), some are of those who accepted the council, but most are of those who rejected it. No longer a residential bishopric, Babylon is today listed by both the Eastern Orthodox Church and the Catholic Church as a titular see.

During the Eastern Roman Empire period the city revolted against the rule of its emperor, Phocas.

During the Arab conquest of Egypt the Byzantine fortress held out for about seven months before finally falling in December 640 to the Arab general 'Amr ibn al-'As. The history of this conquest, and of the subsequent rule of the then still Coptic Christian city by the Arabs, is told by John Bishop of Nikiû in his Chronicle, which survives now only in Ethiopic manuscripts.
