= Alfred J. Butler =

British ancient historian (1850 - 1936)

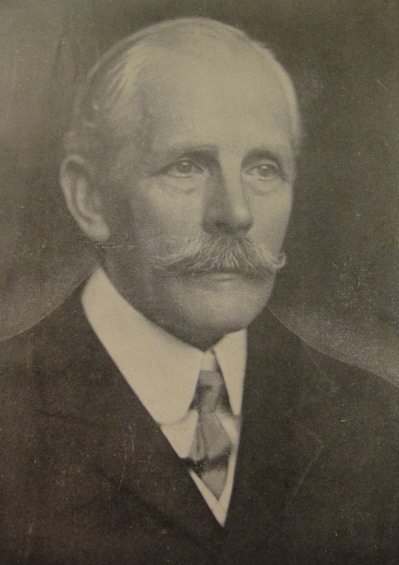
- Born: 1850
- Died: 1936 (aged 85–86)
- Education: University of Oxford
- Scientific career
- Workplaces: Brasenose College, Oxford

Alfred Joshua Butler F.S.A. (1850 - 1936) was a British ancient historian who specialised in the history of the Copts.

== Biography ==
He studied at the University of Oxford and from 1877 worked at his Brasenose College. He was an author of works on Coptology and the history of Egypt during the Arab, Roman and Byzantine periods.

Alfred J. Butler was a self-confessed “friend of the Copts”. On them he wrote in 1911, having known the Copts for upwards of thirty years, I have the highest opinion of their capacity and their character. When the Coptic Congress in 1911 raised some demands to the British authority to end the injustices the Copts suffered from under British rule he sided with the Copts against Sir Eldon Gorst, the British Consul-General in Egypt (1907–1911), whose policy was (to) exalt the Mohammedan and to tread down the Christian, to license the majority and to curb the minority.

== Works ==
- Amaranth and Asphodel: Songs from the Greek Anthology (First ed.). London: Kegan Paul. 1881 – via Google Books.
- The Ancient Coptic Churches of Egypt. In 2 Volumes. Vol. I (First ed.). Oxford: Clarendon Press. 1884 – via the Internet Archive.
- The Ancient Coptic Churches of Egypt. In 2 Volumes. Vol. II (First ed.). Oxford: Clarendon Press. 1884 – via the Internet Archive.
- Court Life in Egypt (First ed.). London: Chapman and Hall. 1887 – via the Internet Archive.
- Abu Salih, al-Armani (1895). Alfred J. Butler (ed.). The Churches and Monasteries of Egypt and Some Neighbouring Countries, attributed to Abu Salih, al-Armani. Translated by B. T. A. Evetts (First ed.). Oxford: Clarendon Press – via the Internet Archive.
- Butler, Alfred J. (1978) [1902]. Fraser, P. M. (ed.). The Arab Conquest of Egypt and the Last Thirty Years of the Roman Dominion (Third, revised ed.). Oxford: Oxford University Press – via the Internet Archive.
- The Treaty of Misr in Tabari, an essay in historical criticism (First ed.). Oxford: Clarendon Press. 1913 – via the Internet Archive.
- Babylon of Egypt, a study in the history of Old Cairo (First ed.). Oxford: Clarendon Press. 1914 – via the Internet Archive.
- Islamic Pottery: A Study Mainly Historical (First ed.). London: Ernest Benn Limited. 1926 – via HathiTrust.
- Sport in Classic Times (First ed.). London: E. Benn. 1930. ISBN 978-0-91323-213-2 – via Google Books.
