= Siege of Alexandria (641) =

641 battle between the Byzantine Empire and Rashidun Caliphate

- Part of the Arab conquest of Egypt (Arab–Byzantine wars)
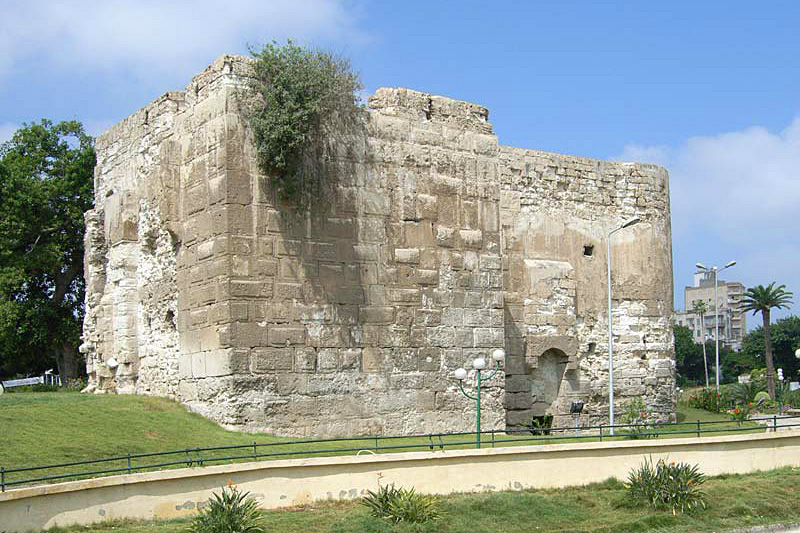
- Western tower, remains of the Hellenistic city wall fortifications.
Date	March – September 641
Location	Alexandria, Egypt 31°12′00″N 29°55′00″E
Result	Rashidun victory

Belligerents
Rashidun Caliphate	Eastern Roman Empire

Commanders and leaders
Amr ibn al-A'as 'Ubadah ibn al-Samit	Cyrus of Alexandria; Theodore; Menas; Constantine

Strength
Unknown	Unknown

Casualties and losses
Unknown	Unknown
- Location within Egypt

Forces of the Rashidun Caliphate seized the major Mediterranean port of Alexandria from the Eastern Roman Empire in the middle of the 7th century AD. Alexandria had been the capital of the Byzantine province of Egypt. This ended Eastern Roman maritime control and economic dominance of the Eastern Mediterranean and thus continued to shift geopolitical power further in favor of the Rashidun Caliphate.

== Historical overview ==
With the death of Muhammad in 632 AD, the Muslim world began a period of rapid expansion. Under the rule of the first caliphs, the Rashidun, Muslim armies began assaulting the borders of both Sassanid Persia and the Byzantine Empire. Neither of the two former powers was prepared for the aggressive expansion of the Arabs, as both underestimated Islam and its growing support; this is best depicted by the views held by the Byzantines and the slow reaction of the Sassanids. After smashing both the Byzantines at Yarmuk (636) and the Persians at Qadisiyah (637), Muslim expansion set its sights south towards the provinces of Byzantine Africa.

Following Muslim conquest, the local populace and political infrastructure was left largely intact, albeit under Muslim control. Some groups were persecuted, namely anyone deemed to be "pagan" or an "idolater". The Muslim conquerors were generally tolerant of the Jews and Christians of captured regions. Many rose to positions of relative power and affluence in the new cities like Baghdad. This led to a stable and smooth running empire. The only major difference in treatment between Muslims and non-Muslims was the taxation system. Non-believers were obligated to pay to the local government a levy called the jizya, while Muslims had to pay a Zakāt. Due to paying jizya by the non-believers, it becomes the mandatory responsibility of the Muslim ruler to protect the non-believer citizens' life and property. This jizya also as for the non-believers, who do not participate the war conducted by the Muslim government. Jizya is not applicable for old persons, women and children only for the capable persons who are able to participate in war willingly not want to do so.

== Byzantine Alexandria ==
The rulers of Alexandria before the arrival of Islam were the Romans. A heavily trafficked port city, Alexandria was crucial to maintaining imperial control over the region, based on its large Greco-Egyptian population and economic importance. The population of Alexandria was influenced by both the cultural and religious views of their Roman rulers; nevertheless, the rural population spoke Coptic, rather than Greek, which was more common in the coastal cities.

Egypt at the time had just recently been conquered by the Sasanian Empire and retaken by treaty. The Chalcedonian Schism had torn the empire between Chalcedonians and non-Chalcedonians, with most of Egypt's population being non-Chalcedonian. The emperor, Heraclius was a Chalcedonian, and had appointed Cyrus as both the Chalcedonian Patriarch of Alexandria (who was unrecognised by the Egyptians) and the praefectus Aegypti. Cyrus enstated a ten-year-long reign of terror in an attempt to bring the Egyptians to Chalcedonianism, forcing them to pray in secret and torturing many to death. The Coptic Pope, Pope Benjamin I, was in hiding throughout this, and was pursued by Cyrus.

The Byzantines relied on Egypt as the main center of food production for wheat and other foodstuffs. Alexandria also functioned as one of Byzantium's primary army and naval bases, as there was normally a significant imperial garrison stationed in the city. Though with the loss of Jerusalem in 638, much of Roman attention was drawn towards strengthening their hold on the frontier, chiefly in Anatolia and Egypt. Even though they would be able to successfully hold Asia Minor and retain it as an imperial base province, as time went on, Egypt became increasingly difficult to defend.

== Rashidun conquest of Egypt ==
In 634, the Muslim leader Umar ascended to the role of caliph and inherited a heterogeneous and rapidly expanding Islamic empire. Throughout the early 640s, he set his sights on the economically desirable province of Egypt and its capital city of Alexandria. The Muslim invasion of Egypt was led by the commander Amr ibn Al-Aas, who commanded a force larger than any army that the Byzantines could field at the time, as a result of their crushing defeat at Yarmuk four years earlier.

The original attempts by the Arab forces were not directed solely towards Alexandria, but rather at removing the Byzantine fortress of Babylon (Siege of Babylon Fortress) on the Nile Delta. The destruction of the Byzantine military power at the ensuing battle of Heliopolis, also known as Ain Shams, in the summer of 640 and the victory over the Byzantine defenders at Babylon effectively broke Byzantine power in Egypt.

=== March to Alexandria ===
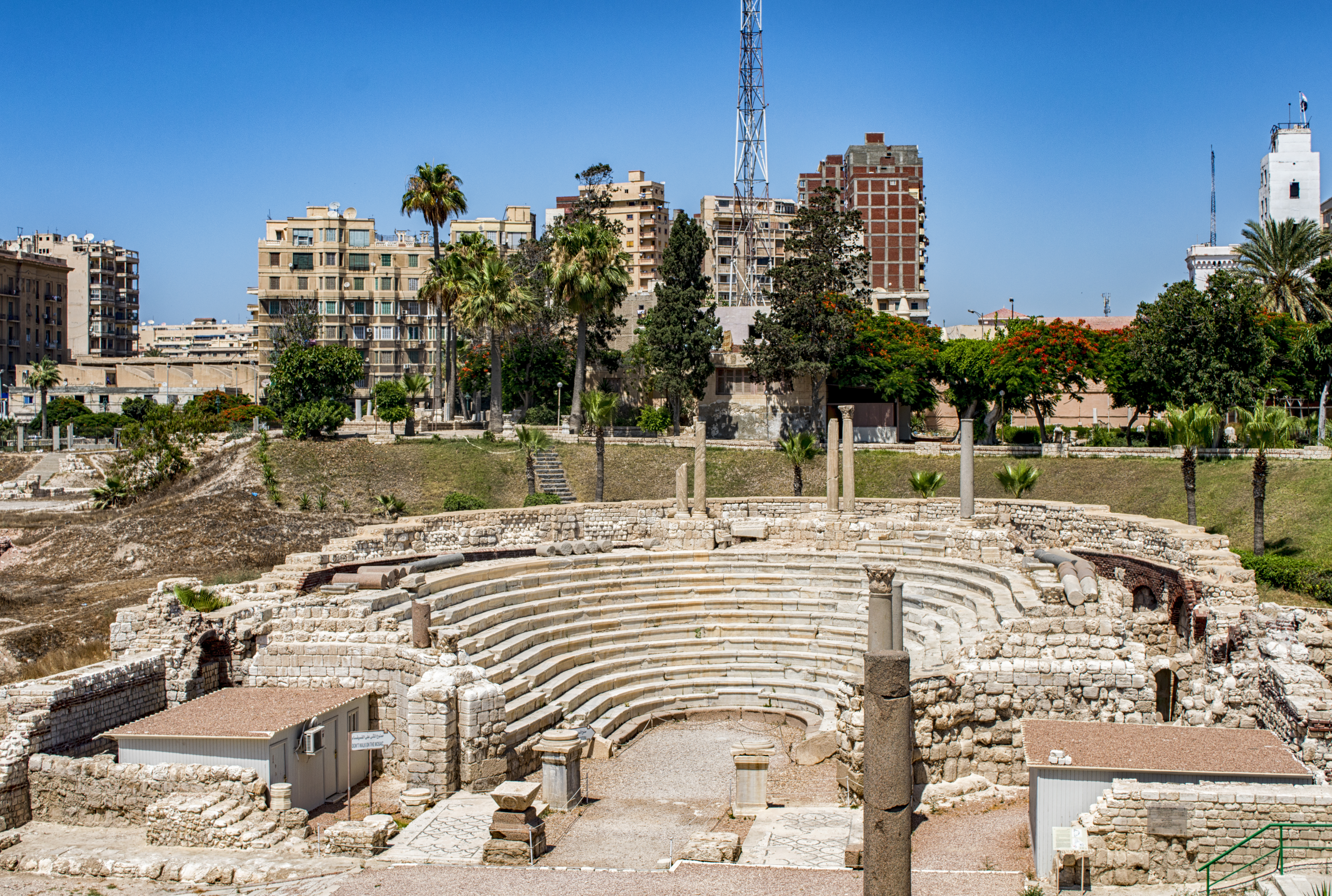
Ancient Roman theater in Alexandria (present-day archeological site of Kom El Deka)

The Byzantine commanders, knowing full well that the Muslims' next target was Alexandria, set out to repel the Muslims through continued sallies from the fort or, at least, to exhaust them and erode their morale in a campaign of attrition. In February 641, 'Amr set off for Alexandria from Babylon with his army, encountering defending regiments all along the route. On the third day of their march the Muslims' advance guard encountered a Byzantine detachment at Tarnut on the west bank of the Nile. The Byzantines failed to inflict heavy losses but were able to delay the advance by a full day. The Muslim commanders decided to halt the main army at Tarnut and send an advance guard of cavalry forward to clear the path.

The Muslims came to Kebrias of Abadja, where Domentianus and his soldiers were. He cravenly fled the city in a small boat, leaving his soldiers to their fate. They attempted to follow him, but in the panic the boatmen fled to their home provinces, leaving many of the soldiers stranded. When the Arabs arrived, the soldiers threw their weapons into the water before their enemies, hoping to be spared, but instead they were all massacred. According to John of Nikiu, the only man who lived to tell the tale was a “gallant warrior” named Zacharias. The Muslims then passed by Sais and, finding the family of Theodorus there, killed all of them.

Now 30 km (19 miles) from Tarnut, the Byzantine detachment that had withdrawn from Tarnut the day before joined another that was already at Shareek, and both attacked and routed the Muslim cavalry. The next day, before the Byzantines could annihilate the Muslim advance guard completely, the main Muslim army arrived, prompting the Byzantines to withdraw. The following day, the whole army marched forward without an advance guard. The Muslims reached Sulteis, where they encountered another Byzantine detachment. Hard fighting followed, but the Byzantine resistance soon broke down and they withdrew to Alexandria.

The Muslims halted at Sulteis for a day, still two days' march from Alexandria. After another day's march, the Muslim forces arrived at Kirayun, 20 km (12 miles) from Alexandria. There, the Muslim advance to Alexandria was blocked by a Byzantine force about 20,000 strong. The resulting action remained indecisive for ten days. However, on the tenth day, the Muslims launched a vigorous assault, forcing the defeated Byzantines to retreat to Alexandria. With the way to Alexandria clear, the Muslims reached the capital's outskirts in March.

=== Theodore and Cyrus in Constantinople ===
Heraclius died in February 641, two months before the fall of the Babylon Fortress, and was succeeded by his two sons Constantine III and Heraclonas as co-emperors. Heraclonas' mother, Martina, ruled through Heraclonas because of his young age and consistently opposed Constantine. Constantine, following his father's wishes, summoned Cyrus from exile and Theodore from Egypt to Constantinople to discuss the invasion. Cyrus was in favour of surrendering to the Muslims, whereas Theodore wanted to continue fighting them and hoped the Emperor would send reinforcements to Egypt. Constantine had been preparing a fleet to send to Egypt, but died on May 25 after a reign of just 100 days. With Heraclonas as sole emperor, Martina gained complete control over the government. She had Heraclonas give Cyrus express permission to make peace at any price with the Arabs, but also gave him reinforcements and a new general named Constantine to replace John. After Theodore and Cyrus' left for Egypt with reinforcements, Martina was deposed by Valentine, who sent envoys to Rhodes with a message to Cyrus' troops, telling them to return to Constantinople and not to side with Cyrus. (Note: The letter stated "Return to the imperial city and do not take sides with him.") He also sent a letter to Alexandria telling the defenders not to obey Martina, and to keep fighting. (Note: The letter stated "Do not hearken to the voice of Martina, and do not obey her sons.") Theodore was pleased to hear this, and without telling Cyrus or anyone but the captain, he secretly attempted to sail from Rhodes to Pentapolis. (Note: It is unclear what Theodore's motives were. Butler suggests "He may have desired merely retirement and shelter from the coming storms; or he may have resolved, like Heraclius, to stake his fortune on a throw for the crown, and to found a new empire at Carthage; or he may have wished to gather resources and watch events, detesting the policy of surrender and hoping to strike a blow at the Muslims from Carthage.") However, the captain of the ship claimed the wind was contrary to him, and Theodore was stuck with Cyrus. They returned to Alexandria on September 14, 641, the Feast of the Cross.

=== Conquest of Alexandria ===
When Theodore returned to Alexandria, he dismissed Domentianus as the military commander of the garrison and exiled him from the city, replacing him with Menas, who was a non-Chalcedonian Copt and popular with the army. Menas held a grudge against Domentianus' brother Eudocianus for Eudocianus' torture of the Coptic prisoners in Babylon. Theodore was angry with Domentianus for his cowardly flight from Nikiu and took Menas' side in their quarrel. Despite being brothers-in-law, Domentianus also disrespected Cyrus and showed him unreasonable hatred. He enlisted the Blues in Alexandria to his side, to which Menas responded by enlisting the Greens. There also came to Alexandria Philiades, prefect of the province of Faiyum and brother of Patriarch George I of Alexandria. Philiades was Menas' friend, but unlike Menas he was corrupt and unpopular, so much so that he was nearly lynched.

Since Theodore and Cyrus' arrival in Egypt was on September 14, 641, the Feast of the Cross, a great procession was organised from their landing place to Alexandria. Their entire path was covered in carpets, hymns were sung, and a piece of the True Cross which was earlier brought to Egypt by John, Duke of Barcaina, and stored in a church of the Theodosians, was carried with Cyrus and Theodore. The procession passed between Cleopatra's Needles and entered the Caesareum Church, where a liturgy was prayed. The Psalm reading of the day was Psalm 118:24, (Note: "This is the day the Lord has made; We will rejoice and be glad in it.") but the deacon said another psalm hoping to praise Cyrus and congratulate him on his return. This was said to be a bad omen. Cyrus then gave a sermon about the discovery of the True Cross, perhaps encouraging them to resist the siege in the name of the Cross, despite having already decided in himself to forsake the Cross and surrender to the Muslims.

Cyrus then went to Babylon to negotiate with 'Amr, and agreed the following treaty:

1. Payment of a fixed tribute by all who came under the treaty.
2. An armistice of about eleven months, to expire the first day of the Coptic month of Paopi, i.e. September 28, 642.
3. During the armistice the Arab forces to maintain their positions, but to keep apart and undertake no military operations against Alexandria; the Roman forces to cease all acts of hostility.
4. The garrison of Alexandria and all troops there to embark and depart by sea, carrying all their possessions and treasure with them: but any Roman soldiers quitting Egypt by land to be subject to a monthly tribute on their journey.
5. No Roman army to return or attempt the recovery of Egypt.
6. The Muslims to desist from all seizure of churches, and not to interfere in any way with the Christians.
7. The Jews to be suffered to remain at Alexandria.
8. Hostages to be given by the Romans, viz. 150 military and 50 civilian, for the due execution of the treaty.

He then returned to Alexandria and reported the terms of this humiliating treaty to Theodore and Constantine, convincing them that it was necessary and telling them to report it to the Emperor Heraclonas, who ratified it in what may had been his last act as Emperor, as he was deposed in November. The local populace was not informed of it until an Arab army approached Alexandria to receive the tribute, and the Byzantine generals told the people not to resist. Realising what had happened, a furious mob attempted to stone Cyrus, but he said to them "I have made this treaty in order to save you and your children" and wept before them, which calmed the riot down. The first installment of tribute was paid on 10 December 641, sealing the surrender of Alexandria.

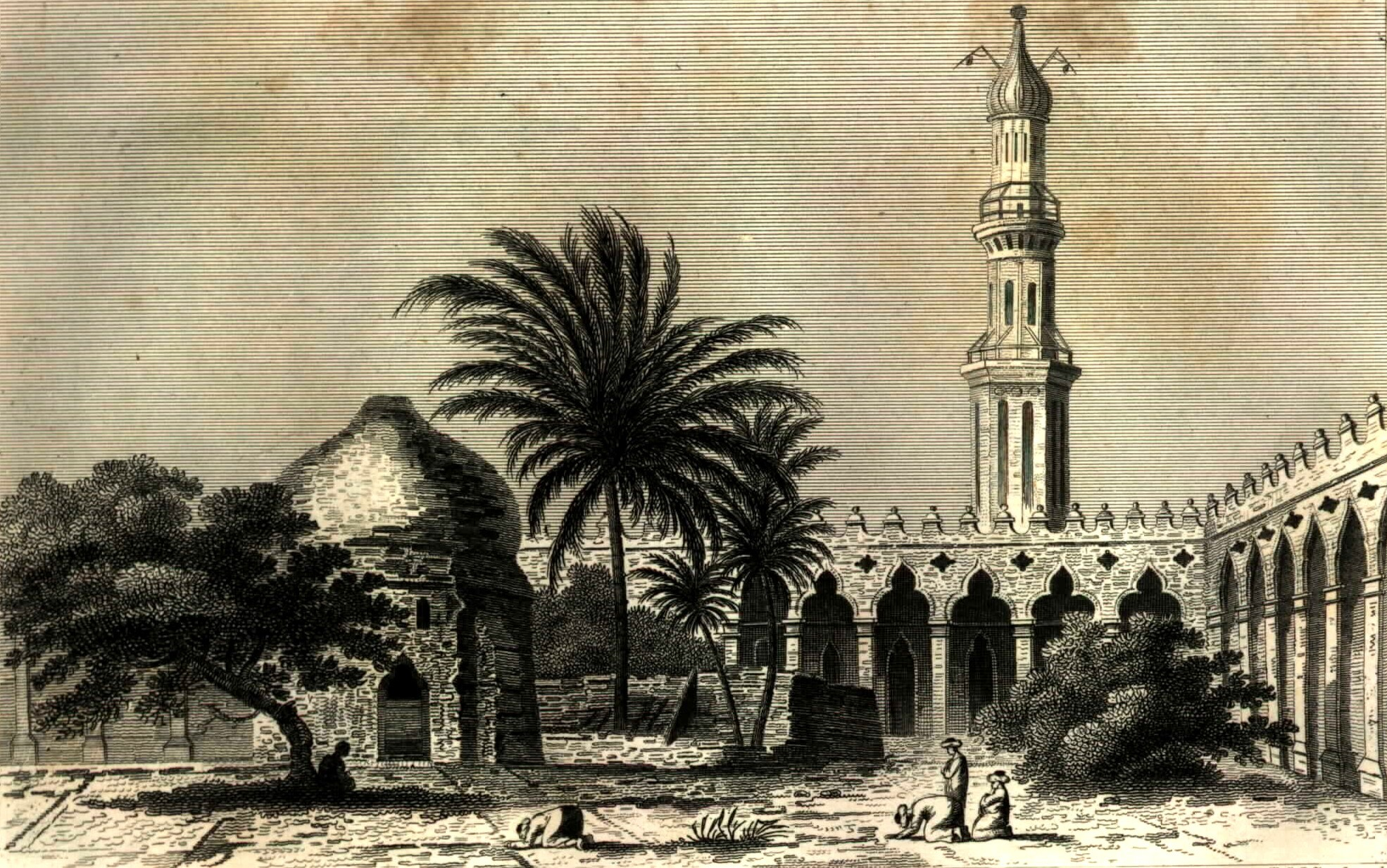
The Attarine Mosque in Alexandria was originally a church but was converted to a mosque after the surrender of Alexandria.

After the siege was over, Cyrus negotiated with 'Amr to allow the Egyptians who had taken refuge in Alexandria during the war to return to their lands, but he apparently did not allow them to do so. Towns along the northern coast of the Nile Delta remained outside Muslim control for some more years; 'Amr evidently did not consider them a priority. He began building his new capital, Fustat, just outside Babylon. Of Egypt's five Byzantine prefects, three (Menas, Prefect of Lower Egypt, Sinôdâ or Sanutius, Prefect of the Rîf, and Philoxenus, Prefect of Arcadia Aegypti) converted to Islam to retain their positions, and the other two were replaced by Muslims. 'Amr and these Muslim governors forced the Christians to work for them, and made them dig a canal from the Nile to the Red Sea.

Cyrus fell into depression and died on Holy Thursday, March 21, 642. Theodore was appointed governor of Egypt after Cyrus' death, and arranged the withdrawal of Byzantine forces from Alexandria. On September 17, 642, Theodore left Egypt and set sail for Cyprus with the last Roman troops. Then on September 29, the 11 months of armistice ended, and 'Amr marched at the head of his Arab army into Alexandria, thus marking the end of Roman Egypt after 671 years. (Note: Since the Battle of Alexandria in 30 BC) After the fall of Alexandria, the commander Amr ibn al-As wrote to the Caliph: "We have conquered Alexandria. In this city there are 4,000 palaces, 400 places of entertainment, thousands of desirable European female slaves, young girls, young boys and untold wealth".

=== Byzantine counterattack ===
There were several Byzantine attempts to retake Alexandria. Though none of these were successful for a sustained period of time, Byzantine forces were able to briefly regain control of the city in 645. Arab chroniclers tell of a massive fleet and army sent by the Byzantines with the goal of retaking Alexandria. The imperial forces were led by a lower ranking imperial official named Manuel.

After entering the city without facing much resistance, the Byzantines were able to regain control of both Alexandria and the surrounding Egyptian countryside. The Muslims retaliated by readying a large force of 15,000 who promptly set out to retake the city under command of the veteran Amr ibn Al-As. The Byzantines, following their standard tactical doctrine, advanced out of the city and sought an open battle away from the shelter of their fortifications. Accounts of the battle portray the Muslim forces as relying heavily on their archers before eventually assaulting the Byzantine positions, driving many back and routing the rest in the process. After this, the Byzantines were utterly defeated and withdrew from the region.

In 654, yet another attempt to bring Alexandria back into imperial hands failed when an invasion force sent by Constans II was repulsed. This generally marks the end of Byzantine attempts to retake the city.

== Life under Rashidun rule ==
There is much evidence to support that Alexandria continued to thrive under its new leaders. Muslim sources claim that, once subdued, the native population of Alexandria was remarkably receptive toward the rule of their Islamic governors, often favoring them to their previous Byzantine masters. In regards to the treatment of the native population, some sources point out the visible efforts made by the Muslims to respect the cultural identity and religious freedoms of the local population. In his analysis on the post-conquest status of regions affected by Islamic expansion, Dr. Gustav LeBon writes:

“However, the early Caliphs, who enjoyed a rare ingenuity which was unavailable to the propagandists of new faiths, realized that laws and religion cannot be imposed by force. Hence they were remarkably kind in the way they treated the peoples of Syria, Egypt, Spain and every other country they subdued, leaving them to practice their laws and regulations and beliefs and imposing only a small Jizya in return for their protection and keeping peace among them. In truth, nations have never known merciful and tolerant conquerors like the Arabs.”

In a later section LeBon further claims:

“The mercy and tolerance of the conquerors were among the reasons for the spread of their conquests and for the nations’ adoptions of their faith and regulations and language, which became deeply rooted, resisted all sorts of attack and remained even after the disappearance of the Arabs’ control on the world stage, though historians deny the fact. Egypt is the most evident proof of this. It adopted what the Arabs had brought over, and reserved it. Conquerors before the Arabs—the Persians, Greeks and Byzantines—could not overthrow the ancient Pharaoh civilization and impose what they had brought instead.”

Thus the majority of the population enjoyed a fair amount of local autonomy under Muslim leadership. The following is an account that reputedly took place shortly after the surrender of the city to Amr:

“And when [Amr] saw the patriarch, he received him with respect, and said to his companions and private friends: ‘Verily in all the lands of which we have taken possession hitherto I have never seen a man of God like this man. Then Amr turned to him, and said to him: ‘Resume the government of all your churches and of your people, and administer their affairs. And if you will pray for me, that I may go to the West and to Pentapolis, and take possession of them, as I have of Egypt, and return to you in safety and speedily, I will do for you all that you shall ask of me.” Then the holy patriarch Benjamin prayed for Amr, and pronounced an eloquent discourse, which made Amr and those present with him marvel, and which contained words of exhortation and much profit for those that heard him; and he revealed certain matters to Amr, and departed from his presence honored and revered.”

=== Islamic influence ===
Culturally, the city continued to function much the way it had under Byzantine rule. Greek, Coptic, and Arabic were all spoken fluently throughout the city and documents continued to be published in Greek and Coptic for some time following the takeover. Coptic was also continued in the fields of medicine, mathematics, and alchemy, whose practices thrived under the budding advances of Islamic intellectualism. However, after the 11th century, Arabic replaced Greek and Coptic as the principal language of the city.

In terms of religion, Alexandria was largely characterized by its heterogeneous makeup, both before and after the advent of Islam. Indeed, from the third century on, Alexandria served as a major base for both the practice of Monophysitism and Nestorianism, as well as a surprising number of other Christian sects that found refuge in Egypt.

From a cultural perspective, the practice of marriage between Muslim men and non-Muslim women was a fairly common one, and at least a sizeable portion of the Muslim invasion force that settled in and around the city of Alexandria took native Egyptian women as their brides. As this was typically discouraged by the umma and prohibited by the reigning caliph Umar, this gives credence to the Islamic state's desire to respect the lives of the local population rather than act as agents of disorder.

The fall of Alexandria and the acquisition of the Byzantine Empire's oriental provinces of Egypt and Syria are generally seen as a critical step towards the culmination of uniquely Islamic identity. The importance of Alexandria as the staging point for future conquests and economic purposes should not be dismissed. It is accurate then to say that the loss of these provinces paved the way for the future Muslim conquest of the Byzantine Exarchate of Africa, which included key cities such as Cyrenaica (642), Tripoli (643), and Kairouan (670). Thus the fall of Alexandria accentuated a clearly defined geopolitical shift in influence from the regions of interior Arabia to those of the Mediterranean and in the ensuing centuries, the significance of these conquests would allow Egypt to become the seat of dominant Muslim law.

== Sources ==
- Charles, Robert H. (2007) [1916]. The Chronicle of John, Bishop of Nikiu: Translated from Zotenberg's Ethiopic Text. Merchantville, NJ: Evolution Publishing. ISBN 9781889758879.
- Haykal, Muhammad Husayn (1944). Al Farooq, Umar.
- Meyendorff, John (1989). Imperial unity and Christian divisions: The Church 450-680 A.D. The Church in history. Vol. 2. Crestwood, NY: St. Vladimir's Seminary Press. ISBN 9780881410563.
- Ostrogorsky, George (1956). History of the Byzantine State. Oxford: Basil Blackwell.
