= Menas (Coptic general) =

7th century Egyptian general

Menas (fl. 7th century) was an Egyptian military commander. A native Egyptian Copt, he was a general in the Byzantine army. He led the garrison in Alexandria during the Siege of Alexandria from 641 to 642. The main source on his life is John of Nikiu.

== Biography ==
Menas was a non-Chalcedonian Copt, thus sharing his faith with most of Egypt's population, but not its elites, who were mostly Chalcedonians. This made him very popular with the army. When the Arabs conquered most of Egypt in 641, he withdrew to Alexandria with the rest of the army. He held a bitter grudge against his fellow general Eudocianus for his cruelty to the Copts who were imprisoned in the Babylon Fortress, either for refusing to accept the Council of Chalcedon or on charges of sedition. This was because on Easter of 641, when the Babylon Fortress fell to the Muslims, Eudocianus had the Coptic prisoners there scourged and their hands cut off.

Menas competed for power with Domentianus, Eudocianus' younger brother. The hostility between them grew so much that Domentianus recruited Alexandria's Blues to his side, to which Menas responded by recruiting the rival Greens. Around this time a certain Philiades, the corrupt and unpopular prefect of the province of Faiyum and brother of Patriarch George, arrived in Alexandria. Although Menas befriended and honoured him, Philiades secretly plotted against Menas. One day, while Menas was attending a liturgy with his fellow Copts in the Caesareum Church, a mob of Greens arose seeking to kill Philiades. He hid himself in a church, so the mob instead went to his house, burned it, and stole his property, but they spared the people they found there. When Domentianus heard of this, he sent a group of Blues against those Greens, and in the subsequent street fighting six men died.

On 14 September, the de facto governor of Egypt Cyrus of Alexandria and the commander-in-chief Theodore returned from Constantinople by ship. Theodore was furious with Domentianus, because when the Muslims approached Nikiou, he cravenly fled the city in a small boat and abandoned his soldiers to their fate. They and the townspeople were all massacred. Therefore, Theodore summoned Menas to a church of the Theodosians which was near their landing place, and appointed him commander of the garrison. He deposed and exiled Domentianus, whom the people hounded out of the city. With great difficulty, Theodore also calmed the factional riots in Alexandria, and had Philiades' stolen property restored to him.

However, the Byzantines' attempts at defending the city were sabotaged by Cyrus, who went alone to the Babylon Fortress and negotiated the following treaty with Amr:

1. Payment of a fixed tribute by all who came under the treaty.
2. An armistice of about eleven months, to expire the first day of the Coptic month Paophi, i.e. September 28, 642.
3. During the armistice the Arab forces to maintain their positions, but to keep apart and undertake no military operations against Alexandria; the Roman forces to cease all acts of hostility.
4. The garrison of Alexandria and all troops there to embark and depart by sea, carrying all their possessions and treasure with them: but any Roman soldiers quitting Egypt by land to be subject to a monthly tribute on their journey.
5. No Roman army to return or attempt the recovery of Egypt.
6. The Muslims to desist from all seizure of churches, and not to interfere in any way with the Christians.
7. The Jews to be suffered to remain at Alexandria.
8. Hostages to be given by the Romans, viz. 150 military and 50 civilian, for the due execution of the treaty.

He then returned to Alexandria and reported the terms of this humiliating treaty to the Byzantine officers, telling them to report it to the Emperor Heraclonas, who ratified it in what may had been his last act as Emperor, as he was deposed in November. The local populace was not informed of it until an Arab army approached Alexandria to receive the tribute, and the Byzantine generals told the people not to resist. Realising what had happened, a furious mob attempted to stone Cyrus, but he said to them "I have made this treaty in order to save you and your children" and wept before them, which calmed the riot down.

Cyrus died on March 21 642, with Theodore succeeding him as governor. By then, with the surrender of Alexandria already sealed, Theodore and the other Byzantine officers had no choice but to arrange the withdrawal of the Byzantine army. They gradually sailed for Cyprus, the last soldiers leaving with Theodore on 17 September 642. A few Byzantine soldiers, including Menas and a general named John, were left behind to oversee the transition of power to the Arabs.

== Sources ==
- Booth, Phil (2016). "The Last Years of Cyrus, Patriarch of Alexandria". Travaux et mémoires. 20 (1).
- Butler, Alfred (1978) [First published 1903]. Fraser, Peter M. (ed.). The Arab Conquest of Egypt and the Last Thirty Years of the Roman Dominion (PDF). Oxford: Clarendon Press. ISBN 9780198216780.
- Jones, A. H. M.; Martindale, J. R; Morris, John (1992). The Prosopography of the Later Roman Empire. Vol. III: A.D. 527–641. Oxford University Press. ISBN 978-0-521-20160-5.
- Rosenwein, Barbara H. (2023). A Short Medieval Reader. University of Toronto Press. ISBN 978-1-4875-6342-4.
