= 646 =

Calendar year

646 in various calendars
| Gregorian calendar | 646; DCXLVI |
| Ab urbe condita | 1399 |
| Armenian calendar | 95; ԹՎ ՂԵ |
| Assyrian calendar | 5396 |
| Balinese saka calendar | 567–568 |
| Bengali calendar | 52–53 |
| Berber calendar | 1596 |
| Buddhist calendar | 1190 |
| Burmese calendar | 8 |
| Byzantine calendar | 6154–6155 |
| Chinese calendar | 乙巳年 (Wood Snake); 3343 or 3136 — to — 丙午年 (Fire Horse); 3344 or 3137 |
| Coptic calendar | 362–363 |
| Discordian calendar | 1812 |
| Ethiopian calendar | 638–639 |
| Hebrew calendar | 4406–4407 |
- Hindu calendars
| Vikram Samvat | 702–703 |
| Shaka Samvat | 567–568 |
| Kali Yuga | 3746–3747 |
| Holocene calendar | 10646 |
| Iranian calendar | 24–25 |
| Islamic calendar | 25–26 |
| Japanese calendar | Taika 2 (大化２年) |
| Javanese calendar | 537–538 |
| Julian calendar | 646; DCXLVI |
| Korean calendar | 2979 |
| Minguo calendar | 1266 before ROC 民前1266年 |
| Nanakshahi calendar | −822 |
| Seleucid era | 957/958 AG |
| Thai solar calendar | 1188–1189 |
| Tibetan calendar | ཤིང་མོ་སྦྲུལ་ལོ་ (female Wood-Snake); 772 or 391 or −381 — to — མེ་ཕོ་རྟ་ལོ་ (male Fire-Horse); 773 or 392 or −380 |

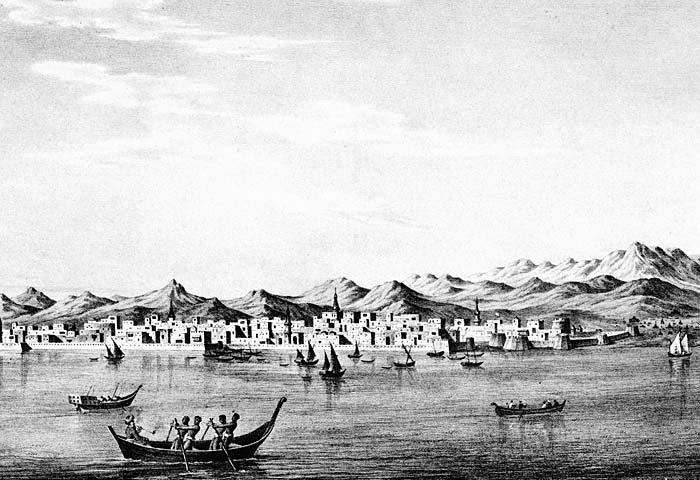
Uthman ibn Affan founds the city of Jeddah

Year 646 (DCXLVI) was a common year starting on Sunday of the Julian calendar. The denomination 646 for this year has been used since the early medieval period, when the Anno Domini calendar era became the prevalent method in Europe for naming years.

== Events ==
=== By place ===
==== Byzantine Empire ====
- Arab-Byzantine War: Alexandria is recaptured by the Muslim Arabs, after a Byzantine attempt (see 645) to retake Egypt fails, ending nearly 1,000 years of rule by Greco-Roman states in the city.
- Gregory the Patrician, Byzantine exarch of Africa, begins a rebellion against Constans II, and proclaims himself emperor; the revolt finds broad support among the populace.

==== Arabian Empire ====
- Caliph Uthman ibn Affan founds the city of Jeddah (Saudi Arabia) on the coast of the Red Sea. He establishes a port for Muslim pilgrims making the required Hajj to Mecca.

==== Africa ====
- Battle of Nikiou: The Rashidun army (15,000 men) under Amr ibn al-'As defeats a smaller Byzantine force, near the fortified town of Nikiou (Egypt).
- Amr ibn al-'As builds fortifications in Alexandria and quarters a strong garrison in the vicinity, which twice a year is relieved from Upper Egypt.

==== China ====
- Summer – Emperor Taizong of the Tang dynasty destroys the Xueyantuo state, during the campaign against the Xueyantuo (Central Asia).

==== Japan ====
- Emperor Kōtoku makes a decree about the policies of building tombs. He discontinues the old customs of sacrificing people in honor of a dead man, and forbids ill-considered rituals about purgation.
- A Great Reform edict changes Japan's political order. It will lead to the establishment of a centralized government with Kōtoku ruling from his palace, Naniwa Nagara-Toyosaki Palace, in Osaka.

=== By topic ===
==== Religion ====
- Xuanzang completes his book Great Tang Records on the Western Regions, which later becomes one of the primary sources for the study of medieval Central Asia and India.

== Births ==
- Abd al-Malik ibn Marwan, Muslim Caliph (d. 705)
- Gudula, Frankish saint
- Li Sujie, prince of the Tang dynasty (d. 690)
- Sun Guoting, Chinese calligrapher (d. 691)
- Tonyukuk, military leader of the Göktürks (approximate date)

== Deaths ==
- January 17 – Sulpitius the Pious, bishop of Bourges
- January 19 – Liu Ji, chancellor of the Tang dynasty
- unknown dates
  - Gallus, Irish missionary (approximate date)
  - Manuel, Armenian eunuch and general
  - Zhang Liang, general of the Tang dynasty
