= Ibyar =

Ibyar إبيار Abyar
- Town
- Location in Egypt Ibyar (Egypt)
- Coordinates: 30.83844°N 30.86376°E
- Country: Egypt
- Governorate: Gharbia
- Elevation: 43 ft (13 m)
- Time zone: UTC+2 (EET)

Ibyar (Arabic: إبيار, romanized: Ibyār), also transliterated as Abyar or Ebiar or Ibiar, is a town in Gharbia Governorate of Egypt, on the Rosetta branch of the Nile.

== Etymology ==
The town name from the plural of Arabic: بير, lit. 'well', and was rendered in Coptic as Abior (Coptic: ⲁⲃⲓⲟⲣ), Hahshei (Coptic: ϩⲁϩϣⲏⲓ, lit. 'many wells') and Paporti (Coptic: ⲡⲁⲡⲱⲣϯ).

== History ==
The medieval writers Qalqashandi and Khalil ibn Shahin al-Zahiri cited Ibyar as the capital of the province Jazirah Bani Nasr. The 14th-century writer Ibn Fadlallah al-Omari referred to Ibyar itself as the "Island of the Banu Nasr", describing it as "an island in the middle of the western arm of the Nile" and attributing its name to the tribe of the Banu Nasr, who had dominated the Nile Delta at one point before being defeated by the Berber Liwata tribe. After this defeat, the Banu Nasr had adopted a sedentary lifestyle in the area of Ibyar.

At the time of the Rauk al-Nasiri, Ibyar belonged to the province of Monufia; al-Dimashqi, described Ibyar as part of the district of Tawwah. Ibn Battuta visited Ibyar during his travels in Egypt, and Qazwini described the town as a source of natron.

In medieval times, Ibyar was noted for its linen industry. It produced a specialty called muḥarrar, described as "imitation silk".

In 1216-17, following the death of Pope John VI of Alexandria, one of the candidates to succeed him as Coptic Pope was a monk from Ibyar, who, according to one source, had been nominated by the Ayyubid prince (and future ruler) Al-Kamil after the monk's prayers had cured him of a heart ailment. The monk was brought to Cairo before the intervention of the powerful Coptic archon Nash al-Khilafah resulted in him being sent back to his hermitage in Ibyar.

Ibyar's bishopric remained active through the late thirteenth century, indicating the presence of a large Christian population at the time. Its location on the Rosetta branch of the Nile meant that residents could easily travel by boat, which was the main mode of transport in the Nile Delta.

The 1303 Crete earthquake (on 8 August) devastated Ibyar, causing extensive to total collapse of the town's buildings. Modern estimates of the earthquake's ground motion at Ibyar indicate a ground displacement of 1.08 cm, a ground velocity of 0.56 cm/s, and a ground acceleration of 1.17 cm/s².

Ibn Battuta recorded his visit to Ibyar, but scholars disagree as to when. Ibn Battuta himself wrote that he visited Ibyar on 31 July 1326 (29 Sha'ban in the Islamic calendar), during his first journey through Egypt, but H.A.R. Gibb claimed that this date is impossible, since he must have already been on his way to Damascus by then. Ivan Hrbek disagreed, saying that Ibn Battuta probably did visit all the places he mentioned during his first trip to Egypt, but they agreed that Ibn Batutta could not possibly have still been in Egypt on 31 July. Ross Dunn has suggested instead that he passed through Ibyar and other Nile Delta towns in April.

The 1885 Census of Egypt recorded Ibyar as a nahiyah in under the district of Mahallet Menouf in Gharbia Governorate; at that time, the population of the city was 8,449 (4,421 men and 4,328 women).

On 29 January 29 1954, a fire raged through Ibyar, destroying 102 houses and leaving hundreds of people homeless, drawing a visit from then-president Mohamed Naguib.

During the period leading up to the 2012 Egyptian presidential election, the reformist candidate Mohamed ElBaradei resided in Ibyar.

=== Bagam mosque ===
The Jami al-Bagam, or Bagam mosque, was established as a madrasa during the Ayyubid period, in 629 AH (1231-32 CE) by Shaykh Ahmad Ridwan. It rose to become one of the most important madrasas in the Nile Delta by the early Mamluk period. A notable Sufi site, it had been built on the site of an earlier Coptic and Byzantine structure. The mosque takes its name from Shaykh Ahmad Ridwan's grandson Ahmed Bagam the Great, who oral tradition remembers as a rich landowner, and his own descendant Ahmed Bagam the Small, who continued to occupy the location. Ahmed Bagam the Great, his mother, two brothers, and Ahmed Bagam the Small were buried here around the central court. At the beginning of the 17th century, the Bagam mosque was enlarged in the Ottoman style, and the Bagam family tombs were adorned with maqsuras. In 1042 AH (1632-33 CE), the rizaq registers describe the mosque as serving as a zawiya. The Bagam family spread throughout the Delta: in Zawiyat Bimam, one Sidi Ali al-Bagam was entombed at the older mausoleum of Sidi Mas'ud al-Abdi, and other Bagams are known from Quesna and Bilqas.

In the 19th century, control the mosque passed into the hands of the Naga family, whose members were ulama and sharifs of the Shafi'ite rite; they oversaw the sharifs of Monufia. In 1274 AH (1857-58 CE), Shaykh Ridwan Naga al-Kabir renovated the minaret and financed the current minbar of the mosque. His successor, Shaykh Abd al-Hadi Naga, was imam of the Bagam mosque under the khedives Abbas and Isma'il. He established an Islamic school at the mosque precinct. The zawiya of Ali Muhammad Naga, who died in 1930, remains one of the largest religious buildings in Ibyar.
