= 646 (disambiguation) =

646 may refer to:

- Year 646
- 646 (number)
- Area code 646
- ISO/IEC 646
