= Prosopitis =

Island in the western Nile Delta

Prosopitis (Ancient Greek: Προσωπίτις), later known as Gazirat Ibyar (Arabic: جزيرة إبيار) and Gazirat Banu Nasr (Arabic: جزيرة بني نص, lit. 'island of Banu Nasr') was an island located in the western Nile Delta, situated between the Saitic and Sebennytic Nile estuaries in Egypt. The name originated from the city of Prosopis (Ancient Greek: Προσωπίς), the exact location of which is not clear, but it is sometimes identified with Nikiou. The island was also a nome and was inhabited by the Hermotybians (Ancient Greek: Ἑρμοτύβιες), a warrior caste who were known to specialise solely in warfare, according to Herodotus.

Atarbechis (Ancient Greek: Ἁταρβηχις, Ancient Egyptian: Ḥw.t-Ḥr-byk, lit. 'temple (of) Horus (the) falcon'), also known as Aphrodites (Ancient Greek: Ἀφροδίτης πόλις) was the main town on the island, where a temple dedicated to the goddess Aphrodite was located.

== History ==
The island was the site of one of the last Athenian wars against the Persians, which ended in failure. In an attempt to support an Egyptian uprising against the Persians, the Athenians besieged Memphis but were ultimately defeated by the Persian land forces in 454 BC. The Athenians had been on the island since 453 BC and were born there under the rule of the Persian general Megabyzus. The Persians' victory was made possible by the diversion of a canal, which resulted in a mainland connection to the island.

After the Arab conquest of Egypt the Prosopites nome became known as kurah of al-Gazira, which was later reorganised into Gazirat Banu Nasr, with a capital in Ibyar.
