= Manuel (eunuch) =

7th-century Armenian-Byzantine general

Manuel (Greek: Μανουὴλ; d. c. June 646) was a Byzantine eunuch and general of Armenian origin, who commanded Emperor Constans II's failed expedition to recover Egypt after its Arab conquest.

== Biography ==
In October 641, Cyrus of Alexandria, who was both the Byzantine governor of Egypt and Patriarch of Alexandria, (Note: The majority of Egypt's population was non-Chalcedonian and recognised Pope Benjamin I as their rightful Pope.) signed a treaty with an invading Muslim army headed by Amr ibn al-As, agreeing to surrender Alexandria to them after an 11-month armistice. Cyrus died a few months later, and when the armistice ended on 29 September 642, Amr led his army into Alexandria, completing the Arab conquest of Egypt. He became Egypt's first Arab governor, but the caliph soon replaced him with the unpopular Abdallah ibn al-Sa'ad, who extorted high jizya taxes from the Alexandrian population. In turn, some of the Alexandrian elites sent letters of complaint to Emperor Constans II, asking him to retake Egypt and mentioning that Alexandria was only garrisoned by a small force of about 1000 Arab soldiers.

At the time, Manuel was an Armenian eunuch in the service of the Byzantine Empire. In late 645, Constans II dispatched him to Egypt with a fleet of 300 ships. Manuel and his troops landed at Alexandria without facing any opposition and easily overpowered its small Arab garrison, thus retaking the city. The next time the Arab tax collectors arrived to collect the jizya, Manuel sent them away empty-handed, boasting that he was a military man and not an ecclesiastic like Cyrus. (Note: Although they agree on the general meaning, various chroniclers differ on the exact wording of Manuel's declaration: Theophanes the Confessor (815) has "I am not unarmed like Cyrus that I should pay you tribute. Nay, I am armed." (Greek: Οὔκ εἰμι ἐγὼ Κῦρος ὁ ἄοπλος, ἵνα τέλη ὑμῖν παράσχω, ἀλλ' ἐγὼ ἔνοπλός εἰμι.); Agapius of Hierapolis (941) has "I am not the bishop Cyrus who gave you gold from fear of you, because he is a monk dedicated to the worship of God, but I am a man of arms and war and courage; you must understand that by seeing me. I have only contempt and scorn for you. Leave the country and do not return here any more; if you do, I will kill you. What has happened previously is considered excused."; Michael the Syrian (1195) has "I am not Cyrus, who would give you gold. He had a pilon, what I have is a sword."; and Bar Hebraeus (1286) has "I do not drape myself with linen, like Cyrus, that I may give you gold, but with armour.")

Amr was in Mecca at the time, having been dismissed from the governorship of Egypt. When the caliph Uthman heard of Abdallah's utter failure against Manuel, he sent Amr with 15,000 soldiers to Egypt. Meanwhile, Manuel and his troops spread out all over the Nile Delta. According to al-Maqrizi, "they would camp at a village, drink its wine, eat their food, and plunder wherever they went". Ibn al-Athir adds that they "extorted money and supplies from people in the neighbourhood of the capital, whether friendly to their cause or not". Historian Alfred J. Butler strongly criticised Manuel's army for wasting their time in the Delta, opining that, if they had headed straight for the Babylon Fortress, they could have reached it before Amr and easily recaptured it from Abdallah.

Manuel's forces and Amr's met at the small fortified town of Nikiou (Coptic: ⲡϣⲁϯ Pashati), about two-thirds of the way from Alexandria to Fustat, in the Battle of Nikiou. The Arabs prevailed, and the smaller Byzantine forces retreated in disarray back to Alexandria. They closed the city gates behind them, but the Arabs managed to batter the walls down and storm the city. Manuel himself died in the subsequent fighting, along with many of his soldiers. The Arabs then engaged in widespread burning, looting and slaughter. They also captured many Alexandrian women and children as slaves. The church of Saint Mark in Baucalis, where his relics had been kept, was burned, as were all the convents around it. Amr himself intervened to stop the massacre; the Rahma Mosque (Mosque of Mercy) later being built over the spot where he did so.

The defeat of Manuel's forces marked the last attempt by the Byzantine Empire to recapture Egypt for some 500 years, before Emperor Manuel I Komnenos sent a failed expedition there in the 12th century.

== Sources ==
- Agapius (1909) [941]. Universal History. Translated by Vasiliev, Alexander.
- al-Baladhuri (1916). Kitab Futuh Al-Buldan. Translated by Hitti, Philip.
- Bar Hebraeus (1932) [1286]. Bar Hebraeus' Chronography. Translated by Budge, E. A.
- Butler, Alfred (1978) [1903]. Fraser, Peter M. (ed.). The Arab Conquest of Egypt and the Last Thirty Years of the Roman Dominion (PDF). Oxford: Clarendon Press. ISBN 9780198216780.
- Cosman, Madeleine Pelner; Jones, Linda Gale (2009). Handbook to Life in the Medieval World, 3-Volume Set, Volumes 1-3. Infobase Publishing. ISBN 9781438109077.
- Crawford, Peter (July 16, 2013). The War of the Three Gods: Romans, Persians and the Rise of Islam. Pen and Sword. ISBN 9781848846128.
- Guindy, Adel (June 2020). A Sword over the Nile. Austin Macauley. ISBN 9781643787619.
- Jones, A. H. M.; Martindale, J. R; Morris, John (1992). The Prosopography of the Later Roman Empire. Vol. III: A.D. 527–641. Oxford University Press. ISBN 978-0-521-20160-5.
- Theophanes (1997) [815]. The Chronicle Of Theophanes Confessor, Trans. By Cyril Mango (1997). Translated by Mango, Cyril.
- Kaegi, Walter Emil (1995). Byzantium and the early Islamic conquests. Cambridge: Cambridge University Press. ISBN 978-0-521-48455-8.
- Syrus, Michael (1871) [1195]. The Chronicle of Michael the Great, Patriarch of the Syrians (PDF). Translated by Bedrosian, Robert.
