= Arab conquest of Egypt =

639–646 Rashidun Caliphate campaign

- Part of the Arab–Byzantine wars and the wider Arab conquests
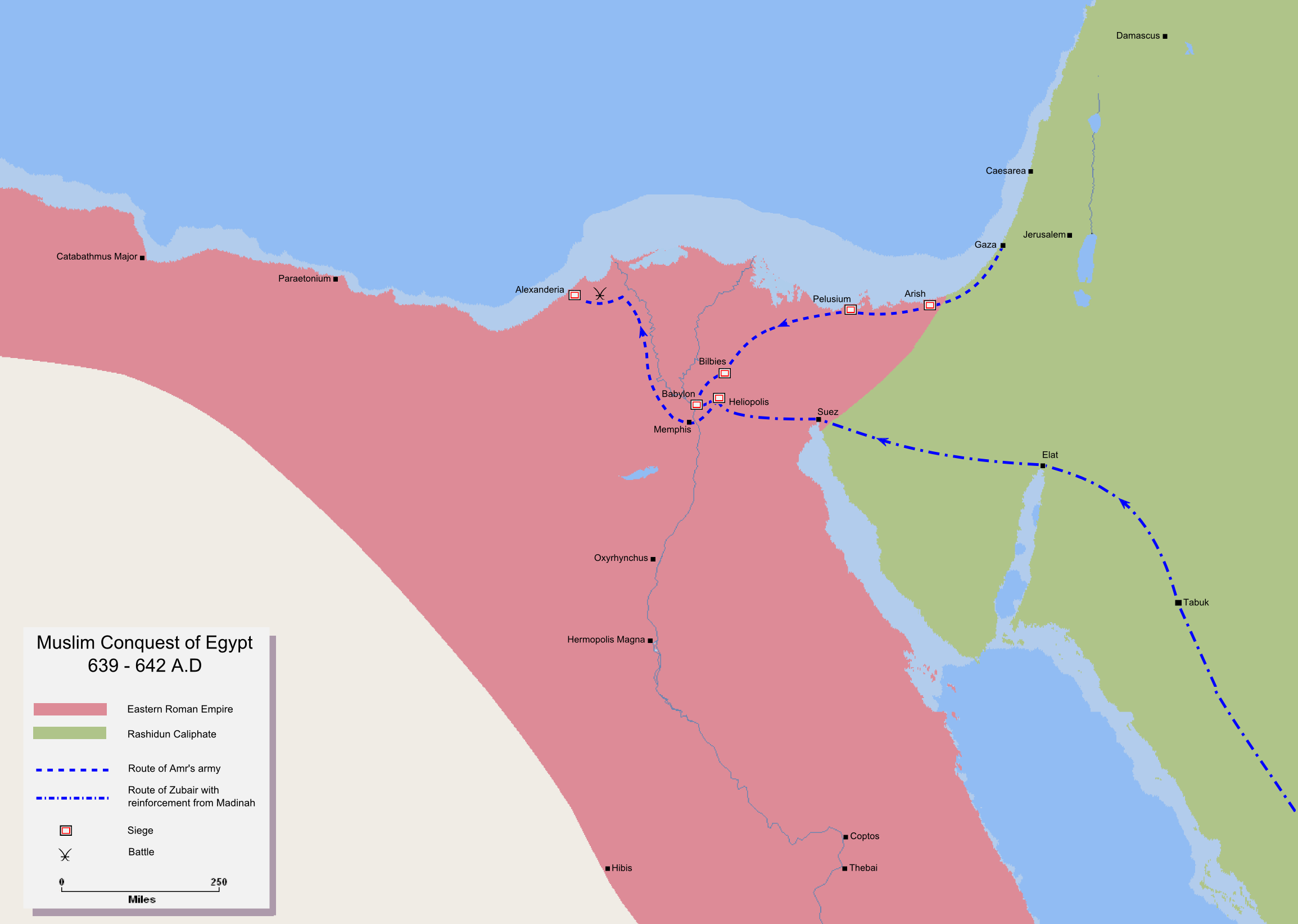
- Map depicting the Arab routes and conquest of Egypt.
Date	December 639–September 642
Location	Egypt, Libya
Result	Muslim victory
Territorial changes	Rashidun Caliphate annexes Egypt, Cyrenaica, and Tripolitania

Belligerents
Rashidun Caliphate	Byzantine Empire; Kingdom of Makuria

Commanders and leaders
639–642: Caliph Umar; Amr ibn al-As; Zubayr ibn al-Awwam; Ubadah ibn al-Samit; Miqdad ibn Aswad; Kharija ibn Hudhafa; Maslama ibn Mukhallad; Uqba ibn Amir; Busr ibn Abi Artat; Uqba ibn Nafi; Mu'awiya ibn Hudayj	639–642: Emperor Heraclius; Cyrus of Alexandria; Theodorus; Domentianus; Theodosius; Anastasius; John, Duke of Barca †; Aretion †; Menas; Qalidurut
645–646: Caliph Uthman; Amr ibn al-As; Abd Allah ibn Sa'd	645–646: Emperor Constans II; Manuel †

The Arab conquest of Egypt, led by the army of Amr ibn al-As, under the Rashidun Caliphate took place between 639 and 642 AD. It ended the Roman period in Egypt which began in 30 BC and lasted for seven centuries, and more broadly, the Greco-Roman period which lasted for about a millennium.

Prior to the conquest, Byzantine rule in the country had been shaken, as Egypt had been conquered and occupied by the Sasanian Empire for a decade between 618–629, before being reconquered by the Byzantines under emperor Heraclius. The Caliphate took advantage of Byzantines' exhaustion to invade Egypt.

During the mid-630s, the Romans had already lost the Levant and its Ghassanid allies in Arabia to the Caliphate. The loss of the prosperous province of Egypt and the defeat of the Byzantine armies severely weakened the empire, resulting in further territorial losses in the centuries to come.

== Background ==
In 640, Heraclius was the Byzantine emperor, Cyrus of Alexandria was both the government-appointed Chalcedonian Patriarch of Alexandria and de facto governor of Egypt, and Theodore was the commander-in-chief of the Byzantine army in the province. The majority of the Egyptians were non-Chalcedonian Oriental Christians who recognised Pope Benjamin I as their rightful Pope and Patriarch of Alexandria rather than Cyrus.

Since the time of the Byzantine Emperor Justinian I, Egypt was administratively divided into four provinces under the control of the general ruler of the East in Constantinople. These provinces were Aigyptiaca (Alexandria and the western Delta), Augustamnica (the eastern Delta until Arish in northern Sinai), Arcadia (Middle Egypt to Oxyrhynchus) and Thebaid (Upper Egypt starting at Hermopolis). Each of these provinces was headed by a Pagarch (prefect). This division resulted in divided accountability for Egypt, which contributed to its defeat to both the Sasanian invasion (618–621 AD) and the Arab invasion (641 AD).

Following the death of Muhammad in 632 AD, the Arab armies of the Rashidun Caliphate began expanding toward both Sasanian Persia and the Byzantine Empire. Neither of the two former powers was prepared for the aggressive expansion of the Arabs, as both largely underestimated them. This is best depicted by the ambivalent views held by the Byzantines and the painstakingly slow reaction of the Sasanians.

After defeating the Byzantines at Yarmuk (636 AD) and the Persians at al-Qadisiyyah (637 AD), the gaze of the Arab generals turned towards the riches of Byzantine Africa. After the Siege of Jerusalem, it was Amr ibn al-As who suggested an invasion of Egypt to the Caliph Umar, being familiar with the country's prosperity both from visiting it as a merchant and from leading the expedition to Gaza in 637. Appealing to the Caliph, he said "the conquest of Egypt will give great power to the Muslims and will be a great aid to them, for it is the wealthiest land and the weakest in fighting and war power."

After being convinced by Amr to proceed with the invasion, Umar is said to have had "an eleventh-hour change of heart", but too late to stop it. This element of the story, which conveys the caliph's wariness at allowing a general to seize such an asset, may have been a later embellishment in light of Amr's subsequent reputation as a stubbornly independent governor.

For three years after the Muslim conquest of Syria, Cyrus had been paying them tribute not to invade Egypt. (Note: This is recounted by numerous ancient historians, including Nicephorus, Theophanes, Michael the Syrian, Severus, Agapius and Eutychius. However, Butler doubts that it happened.)

== Rashidun invasion of Egypt ==
=== Crossing the Egyptian border ===
In December 639, Amr ibn al-As left for Egypt with a force of 4,000 troops. The invading army included units from various Arab tribes, especially from Yemen. Most of the soldiers belonged to the Arab tribe of 'Ak, but Al-Kindi mentioned that one third of the soldiers belonged to the Arab tribe of Ghafik. The Arab army also contained many apostates whom the Caliph Abu Bakr forced back into Islam during the Ridda Wars. These were encouraged by Abu Bakr's successor, Umar ibn al-Khattab, to join the conquests as a way to tempt them to gain bounty and to keep them away from seditious activities. On the way to Egypt through northern Sinai and along the Mediterranean coast, the Arab soldiers were also joined by numerous bedouins from Sinai and the Eastern Desert, Nabataeans, some Roman and Persian converts to Islam, as well as bandits and vagabonds. Amr ibn al-As enticed these various groups by promising them war booty, spoils and captives in return for their help in battles leading to the invasion. In total, the invaders numbered between twelve and fifteen thousand men.

However, Umar, the Muslim caliph, reconsidered his orders to Amr and considered it unwise to expect to conquer such a large country as Egypt with a mere 4,000 soldiers. Accordingly, he wrote a letter to Amr ordering him to "return with all haste to the court of the Caliph, so that his soldiers might join additional campaigns being planned elsewhere". However, there was a provision in the letter stating that Amr's first duty was the protection of his troops, and if he found himself on Egyptian soil by the time he received the letter, the Caliph would leave overall strategic command of movement to him, so as to not unduly burden troops already in the field.

The messenger, Uqba ibn Amir, caught up with Amr at Rafah, a little short of the Egyptian frontier. Guessing what might be in the letter, Amr ordered the army to quicken its pace. Turning to Uqba, Amr said that he would receive the caliph's letter from him when the army had halted after the day's journey. Uqba, unaware of the contents of the letter, agreed and marched along with the army. The army halted for the night at Shajratein, a little valley near the city of Arish, which Amr knew to be beyond the Egyptian border. Amr then received and read Umar's letter and went on to consult his companions as to the course of action to be adopted. The unanimous view was that as they had received the letter on Egyptian soil, they had permission to proceed.

When Umar received the reply, he decided to watch further developments and to start concentrating fresh forces at Medina that could be dispatched to Egypt as reinforcements. On Eid al-Adha, the Muslim army marched from Shajratein to Arish, a small town lacking a garrison. The town put up no resistance, and the citizens offered allegiance on the usual terms.

=== Conquest of Pelusium and Bilbeis ===
According to a legend related by al-Waqidi, Cyrus of Alexandria had a beautiful daughter named Armenousa, whom he sought to marry to Heraclius Constantine. Constantine accepted the marriage proposal, so in late 639 Armenousa left Babylon in a grand marriage procession which included two thousand horsemen, along with slaves and a long caravan laden with treasures that served both as dowry and tribute. On her way to Constantine, who was in Caesarea, she heard of the Arab army approaching Egypt and dispatched a regiment of her guards to defend Pelusium, a garrison city considered to be the eastern gateway to Egypt at the time, while she herself remained in Bilbeis with more of her guards and sent warnings to her father Cyrus. However, Alfred J. Butler dismisses Armenousa's story as a myth.

In December of 639 or early January 640, the Muslim army reached Pelusium. The siege of the town dragged on for two months. In February 640, an assault group, led by the prominent Huzaifah ibn Wala, successfully captured the fort and city.

The losses incurred by the Muslim army were ameliorated by the number of Sinai Bedouins, who had joined them in conquering Egypt, out of a desire for plunder. The Bedouins belonged to the tribes of Rashidah and Lakhm.

The ease with which Pelusium fell to the Muslims and the lack of Roman reinforcements during the month-long siege is often attributed to the treachery of Cyrus, who was also the Greek Patriarch of Alexandria (not the one recognised by most of the population, who was Pope Benjamin I).

After the fall of Pelusium, the Muslims marched to Bilbeis, 65 km (40 mi) from Memphis via desert roads, and besieged it. Bilbeis was the first place in Egypt that the Byzantines showed some measure of resistance towards the Arabs. Two Christian monks, (Note: According to Arabic legends, these were two bishops named Abu Miriam and Abu Maryam. Butler tenuously identifies them with two generals named Marinus and Marianus, mentioned by Nicephorus and Severus.) accompanied by Cyrus of Alexandria and the famous Roman general Aretion, came out to negotiate with Amr ibn al-As. Aretion had been the Byzantine governor of Jerusalem, but had gone to Egypt shortly after losing the Battle of Ajnadayn. Amr gave them three options: convert to Islam, pay the jizya, or fight. They requested three days to reflect and then, according to Al-Tabari, requested two extra days.

At the end of the five days, the two monks and the general decided to reject Islam and the jizya and fight the Muslims, thus disobeying Cyrus, who wanted to surrender and pay jizya. Cyrus left for the Babylon Fortress. The battle resulted in a Muslim victory during which Aretion was killed and Armenousa was captured, but sent back to Cyrus. Amr ibn al-As subsequently attempted to convince the native Egyptians to aid the Arabs and surrender the city, based on the kinship between Egyptians and Arabs via Hajar. When the Egyptians refused, the siege resumed until the city fell around the end of March 640.

=== Siege of Babylon Fortress ===
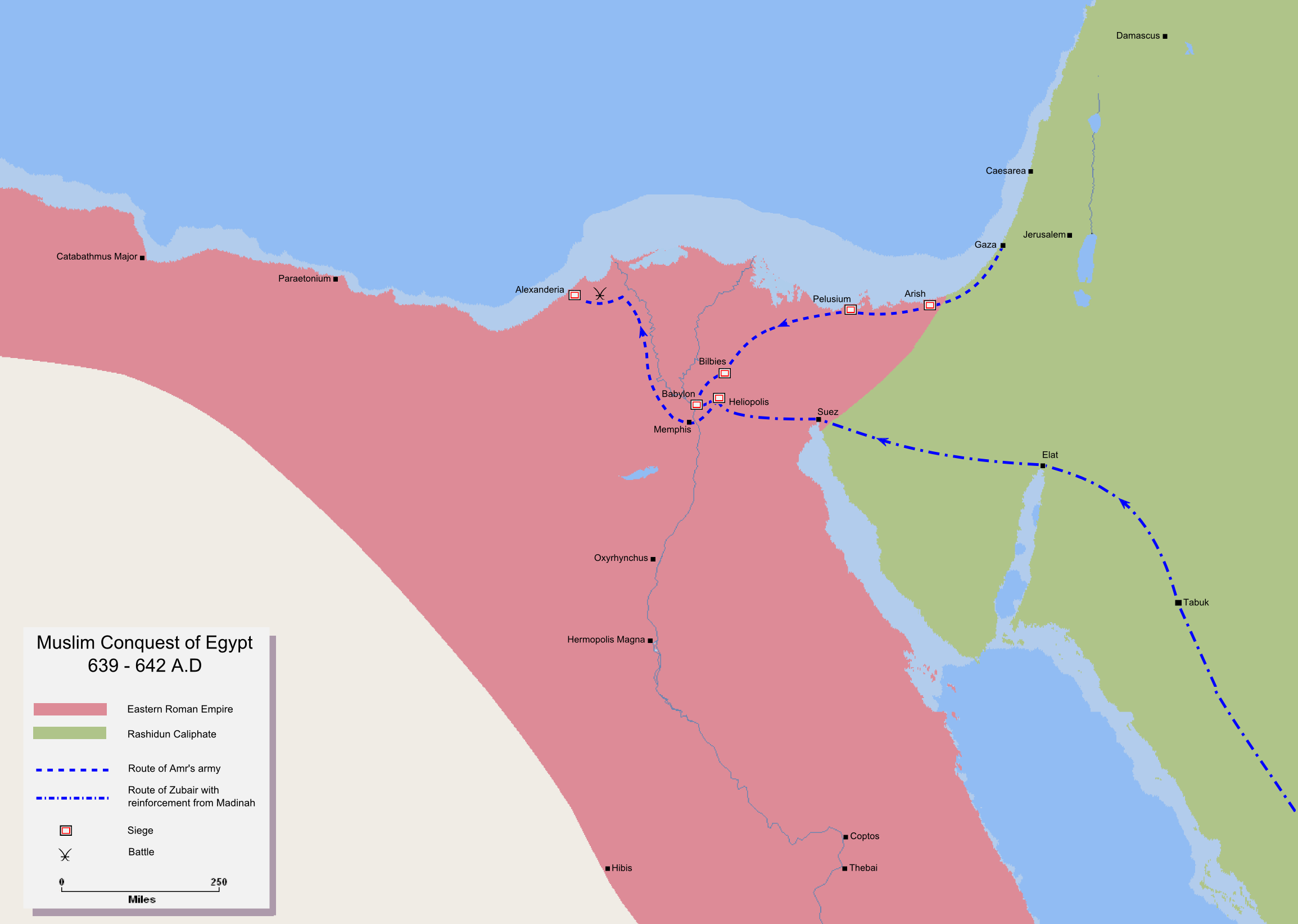
Map detailing the route of the Muslims' invasion of Egypt

Amr had assumed that Egypt would be a pushover but was quickly proven wrong. Even at the outposts of Pelusium and Bilbeis, the Muslims had met stiff resistance, with sieges of two and one months, respectively. As Babylon, near what is now Cairo, was a larger and more important city, resistance on a larger scale was expected. The Muslims arrived at Babylon some time in May 640.

Babylon was a fortified city, and Theodore had indeed prepared it for a siege. Outside the city, a ditch had been dug, and a large force was positioned in the area between the ditch and the city walls. The Muslims besieged the fort, a massive structure 18 m (59 ft) high with walls more than 2 metres (6.6 feet) thick and studded with numerous towers and bastions and a force of some 4,000 men. Early Muslim sources place the strength of the Byzantine force in Babylon at about six times the strength of the Muslim force. For the next two months, fighting remained inconclusive, with the Byzantines repulsing every Muslim assault.

Realising that Babylon was too strong to take, Amr sent a detachment to raid the city of Faiyum. The Byzantines had anticipated that and so had strongly guarded the roads that led to the city and had fortified their garrison in the nearby town of Lahun. At this time, the governor of Faiyum was Domentianus, while Theodosius was the prefect of its province, Arcadia Aegypti, and Anastasius was the prefect of Alexandria (and by extension the de jure governor of Egypt). The defence of Arcadia Aegypti was entrusted to a certain John, whom Hermann Zotenberg identifies with the John, Duke of Barca or Barcaina mentioned by Nicephorus. He had brought the Ecthesis and a portion of the True Cross from Patriarch Sergius to Cyrus, and was likely on a direct commission from Emperor Heraclius.

When the Muslims realised that Faiyum was also too strong for them to take, they headed towards the Western Desert, where they looted as many cattle and animals as they could. They subsequently headed to a town in the Faiyum district named Bahnasa (not to be confused with Oxyrhynchus 50 miles further south), which was defeated and the city was captured. According to John of Nikiû, "they compelled the city to open its gates, and they put to the sword all that surrendered, and they spared none, whether old men, babe, or woman." The Arabs then noticed that John, with a small group of 50 men, had been following them. John and his men retreated to their base at Abûît, but their hiding place was betrayed by a Bedouin chief and they were all killed.

When news of John's death reached Theodore, who was commanding the garrison at Babylon, 'his lamentations were more grievous than the lamentations of David over Saul when he said: "How are the mighty fallen, and the weapons of war perished!"' as John of Nikiu puts it. Theodore hurried his troops up the Nile while Anastasius and Theodosius rushed from Nikiû to Babylon to strengthen it, while a further force was sent from Babylon to Abûît to strengthen it under Leontius, who was "obese in person, quite without energy and unacquainted with warlike affairs". When he arrived, he found Theodore and his troops there already making sorties every day against the Arab base at Bahnasa. Judging that Amr would soon be defeated, Leontius left only half of his men there, going back to Babylon with the other half.

The Arabs eventually gave up on attempting to take Faiyum and returned northwards. Theodore gave orders for the body of John, which had been thrown in the Nile, to be found. It was retrieved with a net, embalmed with honour and sent back to Heraclius. As Theodore was commander-in-chief, Heraclius blamed him for John's death. Feeling that he was blamed due to negative reports from Theodosius and Anastasius, Theodore formed an enmity with them.

==== Reinforcements from Medina ====
In July, Amr wrote to Umar requesting reinforcements, but before the letter reached him, the caliph had already dispatched 4,000 men, mostly veterans of the Syrian campaigns, to bolster Amr's strength. Even with the reinforcements, Amr was unsuccessful and so, by August, Umar had assembled another 4,000-strong force, consisting of four columns, each of 1,000 elite men. Zubayr ibn al-Awwam, a renowned warrior and commander, veteran of the Battle of Yarmouk and once a part of Khalid ibn al-Walid's elite mobile guard, was appointed the supreme commander of the army.

'Umar had also offered Zubayr the chief command and governorship of Egypt, but Zubayr had declined. The column commanders included Miqdad ibn Aswad, Ubadah ibn al-Samit and Kharija ibn Hudhafa. The reinforcements arrived at Babylon sometime in September 640, bringing the total strength of the Muslim force to 12,000 (and likely far less, given losses incurred), still quite modest.

It is said that a Coptic soldier, seeing the size of the Muslim force, expressed amazement that such a small force could stand against the Emperor's army, whereto another soldier replied that Arabs could not yield, and had to either emerge victorious or die to the last man. In another anecdote, some Roman soldiers refused to fight, saying 'We have small chance against the men who have conquered Chosroes and Caesar in Syria.

==== Battle of Heliopolis ====
When Zubayr arrived, he pointed out to Amr that the Roman-garrisoned city of Heliopolis was a short distance away, and that troops from there could relieve the Siege of Babylon. To remove this threat, Amr went with about half of his men there.

The Muslim army reached Heliopolis, 15 km (10 mi) from Babylon, in July 640. The city boasted the Sun Temple of the Pharaohs and grandiose monuments and learning institutions. There was the danger that forces from Heliopolis could attack the Muslims from the flank while they were engaged with the Roman army at Babylon.

There was a cavalry clash near the current neighbourhood of Abbaseya. The engagement was not decisive, but it resulted in the occupation of the fortress located between the current neighborhoods of Abdyn and Azbakeya. The defeated Byzantine soldiers retreated to either the Babylon Fortress or the fortress of Nikiû. Zubayr and some of his handpicked soldiers scaled the Heliopolis city wall at an unguarded point and, after overpowering the guards, opened the gates for the army to enter the city. After the capture of Heliopolis, Amr returned to Babylon.

==== Conquering of Fayoum and Babylon ====
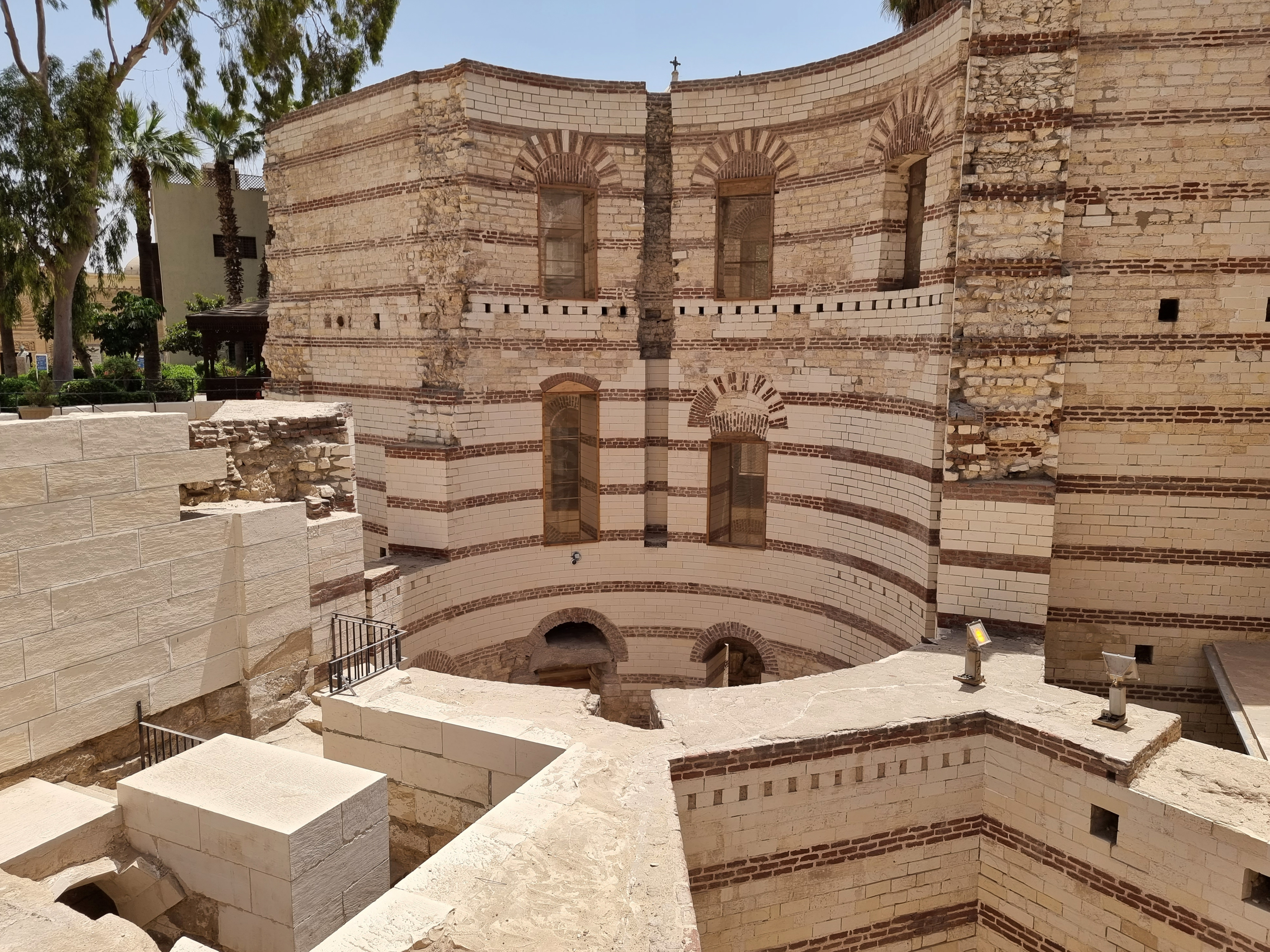
Remains of the Babylon Fortress in Old Cairo

When news of the Muslims' victory at Heliopolis reached Fayoum, its governor, Domentianus, and his troops fled without informing the people of Fayoum and Abuit that they were abandoning their cities to the enemy. When news reached Amr, he sent troops across the Nile to invade Fayoum and Abuit, capturing the entire province of Fayoum with practically no resistance. Fayoum's population was enslaved, and the city was looted (the traditional fate of cities that had resisted).

Emissaries were exchanged between Theodore and Amr, leading to Amr meeting Theodore in person. Then, with negotiations stalled, during the night of 20 December, a company of handpicked warriors, led by Zubayr, managed to scale the wall, kill the guards, and open the gates for the Muslim army to enter. The city was captured by the Muslims the following morning with tactics similar to those that had been used by Khalid ibn al-Walid at Damascus. However, Theodore and his army managed to slip away to the island of Rauda during the night, whence they continued to fight the Muslims.

During this time, Theodore assembled an army in the Nile Delta and put two generals in charge of defending Samannud. Hearing of this, Amr went north to destroy this army. The two generals in Samannud refused to fight the Muslims, but Theodore fought Amr there and defeated him, inflicting many casualties on the Muslims. Unable to damage any cities in the Nile Delta, they retreated back to Babylon. However, Theodore was unable to follow up this victory by recapturing Babylon.

The final assault of the Muslims was on Good Friday, April 6 641, and by Easter Monday the Roman troops had evacuated and began marching to Nikiû. The Romans were given a few days to evacuate so they might celebrate Easter. Many Copts who were imprisoned in Babylon, either for refusing to accept Chalcedon or on suspicion of treachery, were released from prison by the Romans, but Eudocianus, the brother of Domentianus, had them scourged and their hands cut off. The Siege of Babylon had lasted seven months.

=== Surrender of Thebaid (Southeastern Egypt) ===
On 22 December, Cyrus of Alexandria entered a treaty with the Muslims, recognizing Muslim sovereignty over the whole of Egypt and effectively over Thebaid, and agreeing to pay Jizya at the rate of 2 dinars per male adult. According to Nikephoros, Cyrus even suggested giving one of Heraclius' daughters in marriage to Amr. The treaty was subject to the approval of the emperor Heraclius, but Cyrus stipulated that even if the emperor repudiated the treaty, he and the Egyptians, would honour its terms. Cyrus asked Heraclius to ratify the treaty and offered an argument in support. Amr submitted a detailed report to Umar recommending ratification.

Upon hearing about this, Heraclius was furious and had Cyrus recalled to Constantinople. Cyrus tried to defend his actions, but Heraclius angrily threatened to kill him, calling him an abject coward and a heathen, and asking whether 100,000 Romans were a match for 12,000 barbarians. He then handed him to the urban prefect to humiliate him, and sent him to exile.

=== March to Alexandria ===
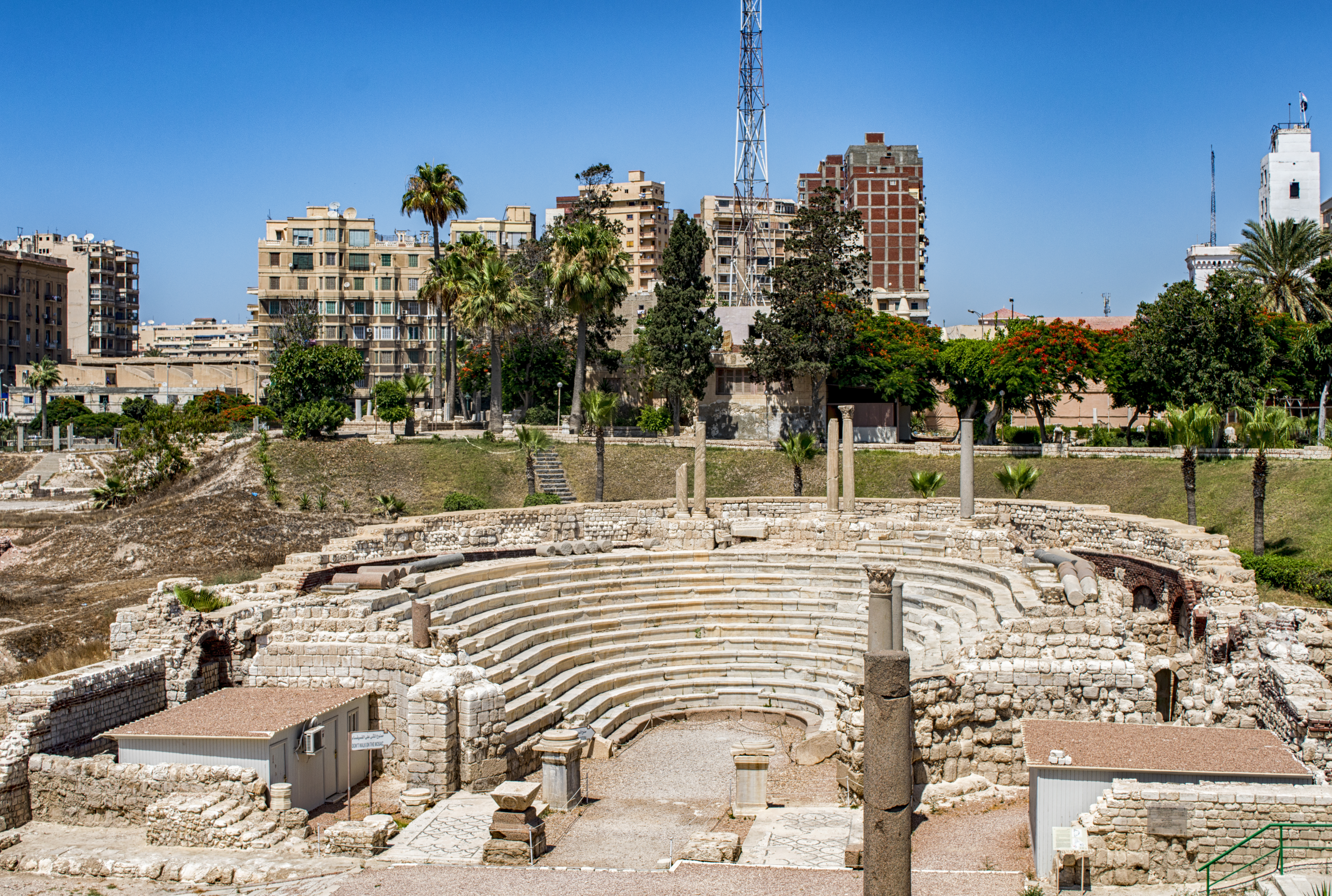
Ancient Roman theater in Alexandria (present-day archeological site of Kom El Deka)

The Byzantine commanders, knowing full well that the Muslims' next target was Alexandria, set out to repel the Muslims through continued sallies from the fort or, at least, to exhaust them and erode their morale in a campaign of attrition. In February 641, Amr set off for Alexandria from Babylon with his army, encountering defending regiments all along the route. On the third day of their march the Muslims' advance guard encountered a Byzantine detachment at Tarnut on the west bank of the Nile. The Byzantines failed to inflict heavy losses but were able to delay the advance by a full day. The Muslim commanders decided to halt the main army at Tarnut and send an advance guard of cavalry forward to clear the path.

The Muslims came to Kebrias of Abadja, where Domentianus and his soldiers were. He cravenly fled the city in a small boat, leaving his soldiers to their fate. They attempted to follow him, but in the panic the boatmen fled to their home provinces, leaving many of the soldiers stranded. When the Arabs arrived, the soldiers threw their weapons into the water before their enemies, hoping to be spared, but instead they were all massacred. According to John of Nikiu, the only man who lived to tell the tale was a "gallant warrior" named Zacharias. The Muslims then passed by Sais and, finding the family of Theodorus there, killed all of them.

Now 30 km (19 miles) from Tarnut, the Byzantine detachment that had withdrawn from Tarnut the day before joined another that was already at Shareek, and both attacked and routed the Muslim cavalry. The next day, before the Byzantines could annihilate the Muslim advance guard completely, the main Muslim army arrived, prompting the Byzantines to withdraw. The following day, the whole army marched forward without an advance guard. The Muslims reached Sulteis, where they encountered another Byzantine detachment. Hard fighting followed, but the Byzantine resistance soon broke down and they withdrew to Alexandria.

The Muslims halted at Sulteis for a day, still two days' march from Alexandria. After another day's march, the Muslim forces arrived at Kirayun, 20 km (12 miles) from Alexandria. There, the Muslim advance to Alexandria was blocked by a Byzantine force about 20,000 strong. The resulting action remained indecisive for ten days. However, on the tenth day, the Muslims launched a vigorous assault, forcing the defeated Byzantines to retreat to Alexandria. With the way to Alexandria clear, the Muslims reached the capital's outskirts in March.

=== Theodore and Cyrus in Constantinople ===
Heraclius died in February 641, two months before the fall of the Babylon Fortress, and was succeeded by his two sons Constantine III and Heraclonas as co-emperors. Heraclonas' mother, Martina, ruled through Heraclonas because of his young age and consistently opposed Constantine. Constantine, following his father's wishes, summoned Cyrus from exile and Theodore from Egypt to Constantinople to discuss the invasion. Cyrus was in favour of surrendering to the Muslims, whereas Theodore wanted to continue fighting them and hoped the Emperor would send reinforcements to Egypt. Constantine had been preparing a fleet to send to Egypt, but died on May 25 after a reign of just 100 days. With Heraclonas as sole emperor, Martina gained complete control over the government. She had Heraclonas give Cyrus express permission to make peace at any price with the Arabs, but also gave him reinforcements and a new general named Constantine to replace John. After Theodore and Cyrus' left for Egypt with reinforcements, Martina was deposed by Valentine, who sent envoys to Rhodes with a message to Cyrus' troops, telling them to return to Constantinople and not to side with Cyrus. He also sent a letter to Alexandria telling the defenders not to obey Martina, and to keep fighting. Theodore was pleased to hear this, and without telling Cyrus or anyone but the captain, he secretly attempted to sail from Rhodes to Pentapolis. (Note: It is unclear what Theodore's motives were. Butler suggests "He may have desired merely retirement and shelter from the coming storms; or he may have resolved, like Heraclius, to stake his fortune on a throw for the crown, and to found a new empire at Carthage; or he may have wished to gather resources and watch events, detesting the policy of surrender and hoping to strike a blow at the Muslims from Carthage.") However, the captain of the ship claimed the wind was contrary to him, and Theodore was stuck with Cyrus. They returned to Alexandria on September 14, 641, the Feast of the Cross.

=== Conquest of Alexandria ===
When Theodore returned to Alexandria, he dismissed Domentianus as the military commander of the garrison and exiled him from the city, replacing him with Menas, who was a non-Chalcedonian Copt and popular with the army. Menas held a grudge against Domentianus' brother Eudocianus for Eudocianus' torture of the Coptic prisoners in Babylon. Theodore was angry with Domentianus for his cowardly flight from Nikiu and took Menas' side in their quarrel. Despite being brothers-in-law, Domentianus also disrespected Cyrus and showed him unreasonable hatred. He enlisted the Blues in Alexandria to his side, to which Menas responded by enlisting the Greens. There also came to Alexandria Philiades, prefect of the province of Faiyum and brother of Patriarch George I of Alexandria. Philiades was Menas' friend, but unlike Menas he was corrupt and unpopular, so much so that he was nearly lynched.

Since Theodore and Cyrus' arrival in Egypt was on September 14, 641, the Feast of the Cross, a great procession was organised from their landing place to Alexandria. Their entire path was covered in carpets, hymns were sung, and a piece of the True Cross which was earlier brought to Egypt by John, Duke of Barca, and stored in a church of the Theodosians, was carried with Cyrus and Theodore. The procession passed between Cleopatra's Needles and entered the Caesareum Church, where a liturgy was prayed. The Psalm reading of the day was Psalm 118:24, (Note: "This is the day the Lord has made; We will rejoice and be glad in it.") but the deacon said another psalm hoping to praise Cyrus and congratulate him on his return. This was said to be a bad omen. Cyrus then gave a sermon about the discovery of the True Cross, perhaps encouraging them to resist the siege in the name of the Cross, despite having already decided in himself to forsake the Cross and surrender to the Muslims.

Cyrus then went to Babylon to negotiate with Amr, and agreed the following treaty:

1. Payment of a fixed tribute by all who came under the treaty.
2. An armistice of about eleven months, to expire the first day of the Coptic month of Paopi, i.e. September 28, 642.
3. During the armistice the Arab forces to maintain their positions, but to keep apart and undertake no military operations against Alexandria; the Roman forces to cease all acts of hostility.
4. The garrison of Alexandria and all troops there to embark and depart by sea, carrying all their possessions and treasure with them: but any Roman soldiers quitting Egypt by land to be subject to a monthly tribute on their journey.
5. No Roman army to return or attempt the recovery of Egypt.
6. The Muslims to desist from all seizure of churches, and not to interfere in any way with the Christians.
7. The Jews to be suffered to remain at Alexandria.
8. Hostages to be given by the Romans, viz. 150 military and 50 civilian, for the due execution of the treaty.

He then returned to Alexandria and reported the terms of this humiliating treaty to Theodore and Constantine, convincing them that it was necessary and telling them to report it to the Emperor Heraclonas, who ratified it in what may had been his last act as Emperor, as he was deposed in November. The local populace was not informed of it until an Arab army approached Alexandria to receive the tribute, and the Byzantine generals told the people not to resist. Realising what had happened, a furious mob attempted to stone Cyrus, but he said to them "I have made this treaty in order to save you and your children" and wept before them, which calmed the riot down. The first installment of tribute was paid on 10 December 641, sealing the surrender of Alexandria.

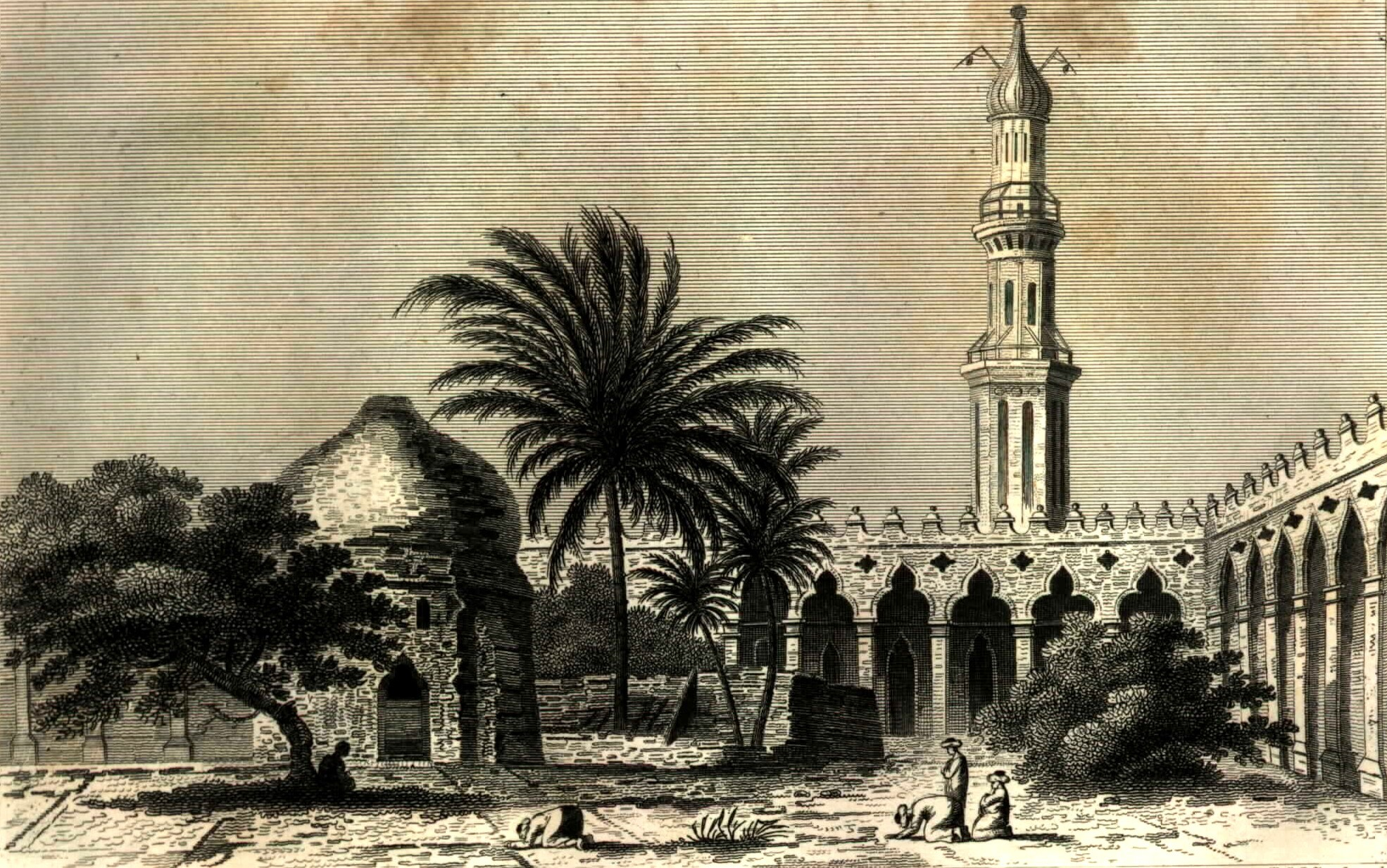
The Attarine Mosque in Alexandria was originally a church but was converted to a mosque after the surrender of Alexandria.

After the siege was over, Cyrus negotiated with Amr to allow the Egyptians who had taken refuge in Alexandria during the war to return to their lands, but he apparently did not allow them to do so. Towns along the northern coast of the Nile Delta remained outside Muslim control for some more years; Amr evidently did not consider them a priority. He began building his new capital, Fustat, just outside Babylon. Of Egypt's five Byzantine prefects, three (Menas, Prefect of Lower Egypt, Sinôdâ or Sanutius, Prefect of the Rîf, and Philoxenus, Prefect of Arcadia Aegypti) converted to Islam to retain their positions, and the other two were replaced by Muslims. Amr and these Muslim governors forced the Christians to work for them, and made them dig a canal from the Nile to the Red Sea.

Cyrus fell into depression and died on Holy Thursday, March 21, 642. Theodore arranged the withdrawal of Byzantine forces from Alexandria. On September 17, 642, he left Egypt and set sail for Cyprus with the last Roman troops. Then on September 29, the 11 months of armistice ended, and Amr marched at the head of his Arab army into Alexandria, thus marking the end of Roman Egypt after 671 years. (Note: Since the Battle of Alexandria in 30 BC)

== Invasion of Nubia ==
In the summer of 642, Amr ibn al-As sent an expedition to the Christian kingdom of Nubia, which bordered Egypt to the south, under the command of his cousin Uqba ibn Nafi as a pre-emptive raid to announce the arrival of new rulers in Egypt. Uqba ibn Nafi, who later made a great name for himself as the conqueror of Africa and led his horse to the Atlantic, had an unhappy experience in Nubia in the First battle of Dongola. No pitched battle was fought, but there were only skirmishes and haphazard engagements, the type of warfare in which the Nubians excelled.

The Nubian cavalry displayed remarkable speed, even more so than the Muslim cavalry. The Nubians would strike hard and then vanish before the Muslims could recover and counterattack. The hit-and-run raids took their toll on the Muslim expedition. Uqba reported that to Amr, who ordered 'Uqba to withdraw from Nubia, terminating the expedition. A treaty was finally concluded with the Nubians in 651–2, securing the southern frontier of Muslim rule in Egypt.

== Byzantine counterattack ==
The caliph Umar was assassinated on 6 November 644, with one of his last acts being to reduce Amr's governorship to only Upper Egypt and give Lower Egypt to Abdallah ibn Sa'd. Umar's successor Uthman completed Amr's demotion by removing him altogether, making Abdallah the governor of all Egypt. Abdallah was deeply unpopular, with al-Tabari saying "Of all the wakils of Uthman, the worst was Abdallah, governor of Egypt". His first action was to raise taxes on Alexandrians. Some sent letters of complaint to the newly installed Byzantine emperor Constans II, mentioning that the Alexandria was only guarded by about 1000 Arab soldiers and could easily be taken. After receiving these letters, Constans sent a large fleet of 300 ships to retake Egypt towards the end of 645. These troops, commanded by an Armenian eunuch named Manuel, landed without resistance and easily overpowered small Arab garrison at Alexandria - thus temporarily winning the city back.

At the time, Amr was in Mecca, where Uthman had recalled him. When Uthman heard of the Byzantine landing and Abdallah's failure to oppose it, he sent Amr to take command of the Arab forces in Egypt. On returning to Egypt, he engaged the Byzantines at the Battle of Nikiou (Coptic: ⲡϣⲁϯ Pashati), about two-thirds of the way from Alexandria to Fustat, with the Arab forces numbering around 15,000, against a smaller Byzantine force. The Arabs prevailed, and the Byzantine forces retreated in disarray, back to Alexandria.

The Byzantines closed the city gates behind them, but the Arabs managed to batter the walls down and storm the city. Manuel himself died in the subsequent fighting, along with many of his soldiers. The Arabs then engaged in widespread burning, looting and slaughter. They also captured many Alexandrian women and children as slaves. The church of Saint Mark in Baucalis, where his relics had been kept, was burned, as were all the convents around it. Amr himself intervened to stop the massacre; the Rahma Mosque (Mosque of Mercy) later being built over the spot where he did so.

The defeat of Manuel's forces marked the last attempt by the Byzantine Empire to recapture Egypt for some 500 years, before Emperor Manuel I Komnenos sent a failed expedition there in the 12th century.

== Egypt under Arab rule ==
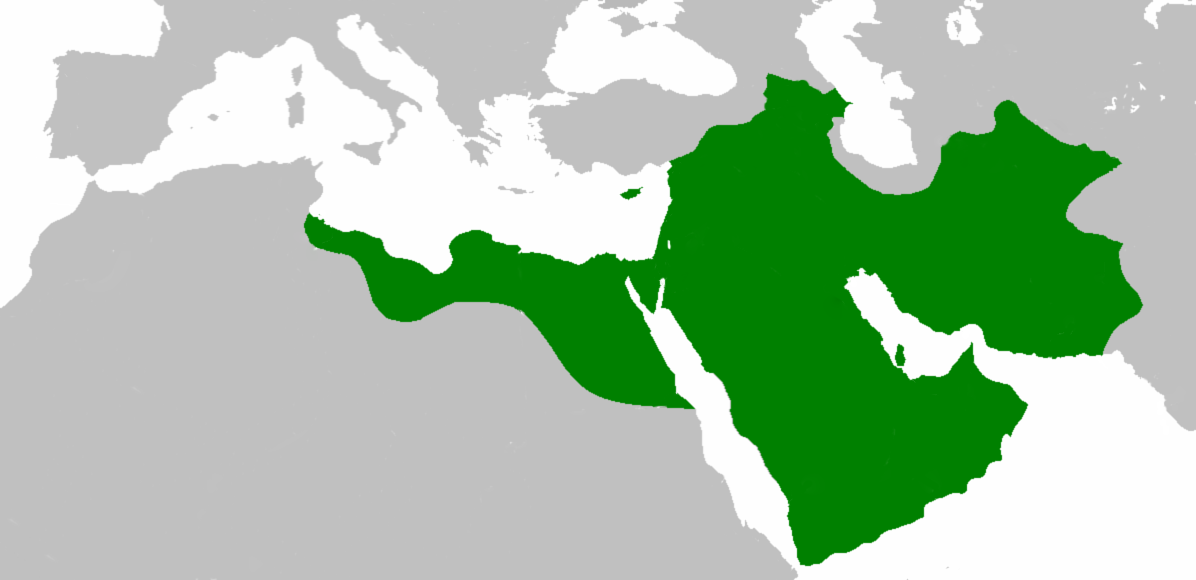
Rashidun Caliphate at its peak under the third Caliph, Uthman in 654 Strongholds of Rashidun Caliphate

In The Great Arab Conquests, Hugh Kennedy writes that Cyrus, the Roman governor, had exiled the Coptic patriarch, Benjamin. When Amr occupied Alexandria, a Coptic nobleman (duqs) called Sanutius persuaded him to send out a proclamation of safe conduct for Benjamin and an invitation to return to Alexandria. When Benjamin arrived, he was then instructed by the governor to resume control over the Coptic Church. He arranged for the restoration of the monasteries in the Wadi Natrun, which had been ruined by the Chalcedonean Christians; four of them still survive as functioning monasteries.

On Benjamin's return, the Egyptian population also worked with him. Kennedy wrote, "The pious biographer of Coptic patriarch Benjamin presents us with the striking image of the patriarch prayed for the success of the Muslim commander Amr against the Christians of the Cyrenaica. Benjamin survived for almost twenty years after the fall of Egypt to the Muslims, dying of full years and honour in 661. His body was laid to rest in the monastery of St Macarius, where he is still venerated as a saint. There can be no doubt that he played a major role in the survival of the Coptic Church". Benjamin also prayed for Amr when he attempted to take Libya.

Kennedy also wrote, "Even more striking is the verdict of John of Nikiu. John was no admirer of Muslim government and was fierce in his denunciation, but he says of Amr: 'He extracted the taxes which had been determined upon but he took none of the property of the churches, and he committed no act of spoliation or plunder, and he preserved them throughout all his days.... Of all the early Muslim conquests, that of Egypt was the swiftest and most complete. Within a space of two years the country had come entirely under Arab rule. Even more remarkably, it has remained under Muslim rule ever since. Seldom in history can so massive a political change have happened so swiftly and been so long lasting."

The Coptic Chronicler Severus ibn al-Muqaffa claims that "The Arabs in the land of Egypt had ruined the country.… They burnt the fortresses and pillaged the provinces, and killed a multitude of the saintly monks who were in them and they violated a multitude of the virgin nuns and killed some of them with the sword." According to John of Nikiu, Fayum, Nikiu and other towns which resisted were destroyed and all their inhabitants massacred, sparing neither women, nor babies. "Egypt had become enslaved to Satan" concludes John of Nikiu.

Uqba ibn Nafi then used Egypt as a launch pad to move across North Africa, all the way to the Atlantic Ocean. Kennedy wrote that when Uqba reached the Atlantic, he is said to have ridden his horse into the sea until the water was below his chest, and then shouted, 'O Lord, if the sea did not stop me, I would go through lands like Alexander the Great, defending your faith'. Kennedy writes further that the image of a warrior whose conquest in the name of God was stopped only by the ocean remains important in the history of the conquests.

=== Fustat, the new capital ===
During the Egyptian campaign, Alexandria was the capital of Egypt. When Alexandria was captured by the Muslims, the houses vacated by the Byzantines were occupied by the Muslims, who were impressed and attracted by Alexandria, "the queen of cities". Amr wanted Alexandria to remain the capital of Muslim Egypt. He wrote to Umar to propose that but Umar refused on the basis that Alexandria was a maritime city, and there would always be a danger that the Byzantine Navy would attack. He suggested instead for the capital would be established at a central location further inland, where no mass of water separated it from Arabia.

As Amr's tent was to be the focal point of the city, the city was called Fustat, meaning in Arabic "the tent". The first structure to be built was the mosque that later became famous as Mosque of Amr ibn al-As. In the course of time, Fustat extended to include the old town of Babylon to the west, becoming the bustling commercial centre of Egypt.

=== Umar's reforms ===
To consolidate his rule in Egypt, Umar imposed the jizya on Egyptians. During later Umayyad rule, higher taxes would be levied. With Umar's permission, Amr decided to build a canal to join the Nile with the Red Sea to open new markets for Egyptian merchants and an easy route to Arabia and Iraq. The project was presented to Umar, who approved it. A canal was dug and, within a few months, was opened for merchants. It was named "Nahar Amir ul-Mu'mineen" (the canal of the Commander of the Faithful), after Umar's title.

== See also ==
- Islamization of Egypt
- Aegyptus (Roman province)
- Arab conquest of North Africa

== Sources ==
- Butler, Alfred (1902). The Arab Conquest of Egypt and the Last Thirty Years of the Roman Dominion. Oxford: Clarendon Press.
- Butler, Alfred; Fraser, Peter M. (1978). Fraser, Peter M. (ed.). The Arab Conquest of Egypt and the Last Thirty Years of the Roman Dominion (PDF) (2nd ed.). Oxford: Clarendon Press. ISBN 9780198216780.
- Haykal, Muhammad Husayn (1944). Al Farooq, Umar.
- Kennedy, Hugh (2007). The Great Arab Conquests: How the Spread of Islam Changed the World We Live in. Da Capo Press. ISBN 978-0-306-81740-3.
- Sijpesteijn, Petra M. (2007). "The Arab conquest of Egypt and the beginning of Muslim rule". In Bagnall, Roger S. (ed.). Egypt in the Byzantine world, 300-700. ISBN 9780521871372.
