= Roman theatre =

Roman theatre may refer to:

- Theatre of ancient Rome, the theatrical styles of Ancient Rome
- Roman theatre (structure), theatre buildings of ancient Rome
  - Roman Theatre of Arles, France
  - Roman Theatre (Amman), a 6,000-seat, 2nd-century Roman theatre
  - Roman Theatre, Aosta, north-western Italy
  - Roman Theatre of Aspendos, Turkey
  - Roman Theatre (Cádiz), Andalusia, Spain
  - Roman Theatre (Cartagena), Spain
  - Roman Theatre (Mainz), Rhineland-Palatinate, Germany
  - Roman Theatre (Mérida), Spain
  - Roman Theatre of Orange, Fran ce
  - Roman theatre, Verona, Italy, distinct from the Arena
    - Verona Arena, a Roman amphitheatre
