= Battle of Nikiou =

646 battle between the Byzantine Empire and Rashidun Caliphate

Coordinates: 30°24′44″N 30°51′13″E

- Part of the Arab conquest of Egypt (Arab–Byzantine wars)
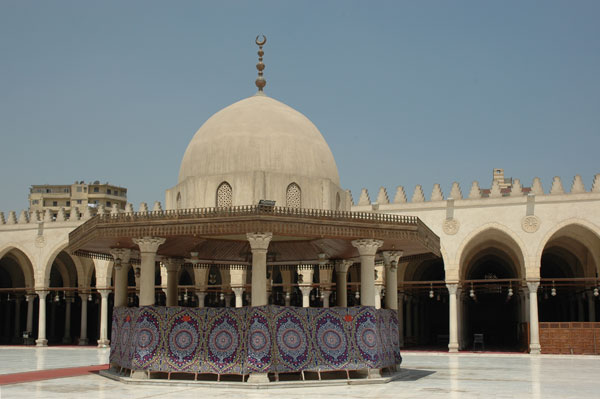
- Amr Mosque in Cairo commemorating Muslim victories in Egypt over the Byzantines
Date	May 646
Location	Nikiou (now Zawyat Razin, Monufia), Egypt
Result	Rashidun victory

Belligerents
Rashidun Caliphate	Byzantine Empire

Commanders and leaders
Amr ibn al-A'as; Al-Mahri	Manuel

Strength
15,000	20,000

Casualties and losses
Heavy	Heavy

The Battle of Nikiou took place between Arab Muslim troops under General Amr ibn al-A'as and the Byzantine Empire in Egypt in May of 646.

== Overview ==
Following their victory at the Battle of Heliopolis in July 640, and the subsequent capitulation of Alexandria in November 641, Arab troops had taken over what was the Roman province of Egypt. The newly installed Eastern Roman Emperor Constans II was determined to retake the land, and ordered a large fleet to carry troops to Alexandria. These troops, under Manuel, took the city by surprise from its small Arab garrison towards the end of 645 in an amphibious attack. In 645, the Byzantine thus temporarily won Alexandria back. Amr at the time might have been in Mecca, and was quickly recalled to take command of the Arab forces in Egypt.

The battle took place at the small fortified town of Nikiou (Coptic: ⲡϣⲁϯ Pashati), about two-thirds of the way from Alexandria to Fustat, with the Arab forces numbering around 15,000, against a larger Byzantine force. The Arabs prevailed, and the Byzantine forces retreated in disarray, back to Alexandria.

Although the Byzantines closed the gates against the pursuing Arabs, the city of Alexandria eventually fell to the Arabs, who stormed the city sometime in the summer of that year. The defeat of Manuel's forces marked the last attempt by the Byzantine Empire to recapture Egypt for some 500 years, with only Emperor Manuel I Komnenos (not to be confused with the aforementioned Manuel) sending a failed expedition there in the 12th century.
