= Zawyat Razin =

Zawyat Razin زاوية رزين
- Location in Egypt
- Coordinates: 30°24′44″N 30°51′13″E
- Country: Egypt
- Governorate: Monufia

Population (2006)
  - Total: 19,898
- Time zone: UTC+2 (EET)
  - Summer (DST): UTC+3 (EEST)

Zawyat Razin (Arabic: زاوية رزين; ), formerly Shubra al-Laun (Arabic: شبرا اللون) and Ibshāda (Arabic: ابشاده; Coptic: ⲡϣⲁϯ, romanized: Pashati, lit. 'the saved, rescued one') known in Antiquity as Nikiû, Nikiou or Nikious (Ancient Greek: Νικιους, lit. 'the one of Nikias (personal name)', Coptic: ⲛⲓⲕⲉⲩⲥ, Latin: Nicius, Arabic: نقيوس, romanized: Niqyus), is a city in the Monufia Governorate, Egypt.

The region hosted Fort Nikiou which was built by Emperor Trajan. The city witnessed the Battle of Nikiou between the Rashidun Caliphate and Byzantine Empire in May of 646.

According to an old Christian tradition, the Holy Family stayed here for a week during their Flight into Egypt. The first church was built here in the 3rd century.

== Etymology ==
D.Meeks proposed an Egyptian origin for Nikiou, based a Shoshenqid donation stele in the Western Delta mentioning a Libyan settlement of Pr-Niȝk. This might have been transcribed into Greek as Νικίου. However, a more likely origin is Hellenic, with the toponym Νικίου πολίς likely being formed from the anthroponym Nikias. Nikias could have been the name of the lieutenant of Chabrias, who also gave his name to the "village of Nikias" on the road between Alexandria and Catabathmos, as mentioned by Strabo.

== History ==
The alternative name of the city could be Prosopis (Ancient Greek: Προσωπίς, lit. 'burdock'), although some believe than in spite of the common practice of naming Greek provinces after their metropolis (e.g., Boubastis for the Boubastite nome), the city of Prosopis appears to have never actually existed. It is only mentioned in very late sources that reflect distorted traditions. There is a reference to a city (polis) named Prosôpis in the epitomes of Herodian's "De Prosodia Catholica," which can also be found in the "Ethnikon" by Stephanus of Byzantium, both of which were likely derived from a common source. This is likely a result of confusion stemming from earlier literary traditions. Herodotus, Thucydides, and Diodorus mention an "island of Prosôpitis," corresponding to the territory between the Canopic branch and the lower part of the Sebennytic branch of the Nile, before the creation of the Prosôpitis nome, but they do not mention a city called Prosôpis. Instead, all sources agree that Nikiou served as the metropolis of the nome.

Very little information has come down to us about the public activity in the city. However, the few indications found in papyrus records suggest that it possessed institutions characteristic of Ptolemaic, then Imperial and Byzantine Egypt, likely in line with its role as the metropolis of the Prosôpite nome. For example, a land lease contract from the 4th century AD specifically mentions that the metropolis had counselors (βουλευταὶ τῆς Νικιωτῶν πό[λεως]). Additionally, an older stele from Kūm Abū Billū reveals through its epitaph that "Sarapiôn, son of Sarapiôn, former gymnasiarch of two gymnasia in Nikiou." This indicates that the city had two gymnasia and civil structures from the Imperial era. The stele of Sarapiôn is particularly interesting as it further supports the hypothesis of Nikiou's location at Zāwiyat Razīn, given its stylistic connection to the nearby necropolis of Térénouthis, which is only a few kilometers away.

== Notable people ==
- Menas of Egypt, an Egyptian saint and martyr
- John of Nikiû, an Egyptian Coptic bishop
- Aristomachus, a Byzantine official
- Pope John II (III) of Alexandria
