= Saint Mark's relics =

Remains of Mark the Evangelist

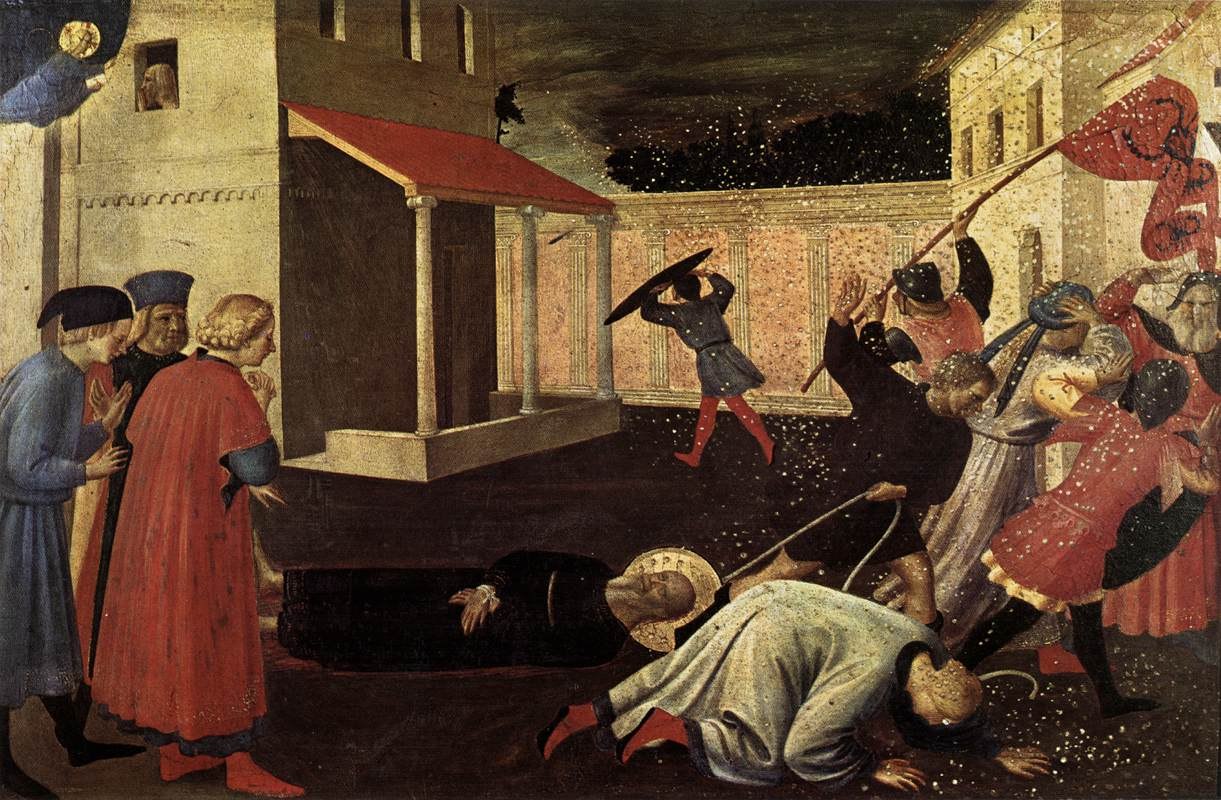
Fra Angelico, The Martyrdom of Saint Mark

Saint Mark's relics, the remains of Mark the Evangelist, have been held in St Mark's Basilica in Venice, Italy since being taken from Alexandria in the ninth century AD.

== Alexandria and Cairo ==
Saint Mark was martyred and initially buried in the Baucalis section of Alexandria in Roman Egypt. Coptic theologian Abu al-Barakat Ibn Kabar wrote that "his martyrdom was at the end of Baramuda, Nisan 27, in the reign of Tiberius, and it is said that [his body] was still buried in the eastern church on the shore of Alexandria up to the time when it was taken by craft by some Franks (al-Farang), those of Venice, where it is now."

The Coptic church believes that the head of Saint Mark remains in a church named after him in Alexandria, and parts of his relics are in Saint Mark's Coptic Orthodox Cathedral, Cairo. Every year, on the 30th day of the month of Paopi, the Coptic Orthodox Church celebrates the commemoration of the consecration of the church of Saint Mark, and the appearance of the head of the saint in the city of Alexandria. This takes place inside St Mark's Coptic Orthodox Cathedral in Alexandria.

In June 1968, Pope Cyril VI of Alexandria sent an official delegation to Rome to receive a relic of Saint Mark from Pope Paul VI. The delegation consisted of ten metropolitans and bishops, seven of whom were Coptic and three Ethiopian, and three prominent Coptic lay leaders. The relic was said to be a small piece of bone that had been given to the Roman pope by Cardinal Giovanni Urbani, Patriarch of Venice. Pope Paul, in an address to the delegation, said that the rest of the relics of the saint remained in Venice. The delegation received the relic on June 22, 1968. The next day, the delegation celebrated a pontifical liturgy in the Church of Saint Athanasius the Apostolic in Rome. The metropolitans, bishops, and priests of the delegation all served in the liturgy. Members of the Roman papal delegation, Copts who lived in Rome, newspaper and news agency reporters, and many foreign dignitaries attended the liturgy.

== Venice ==
=== Legends ===
==== 'Translatio' ====
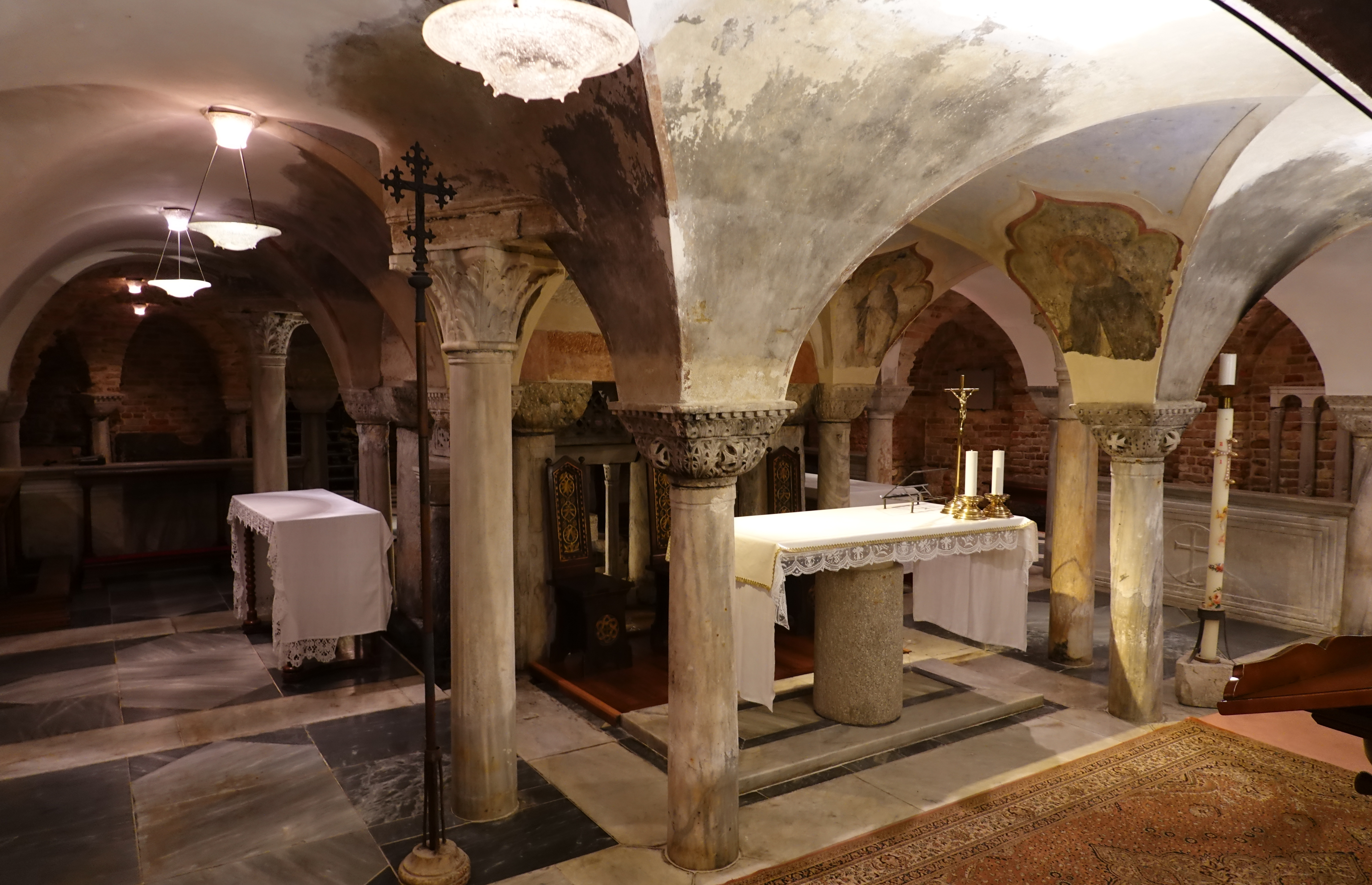
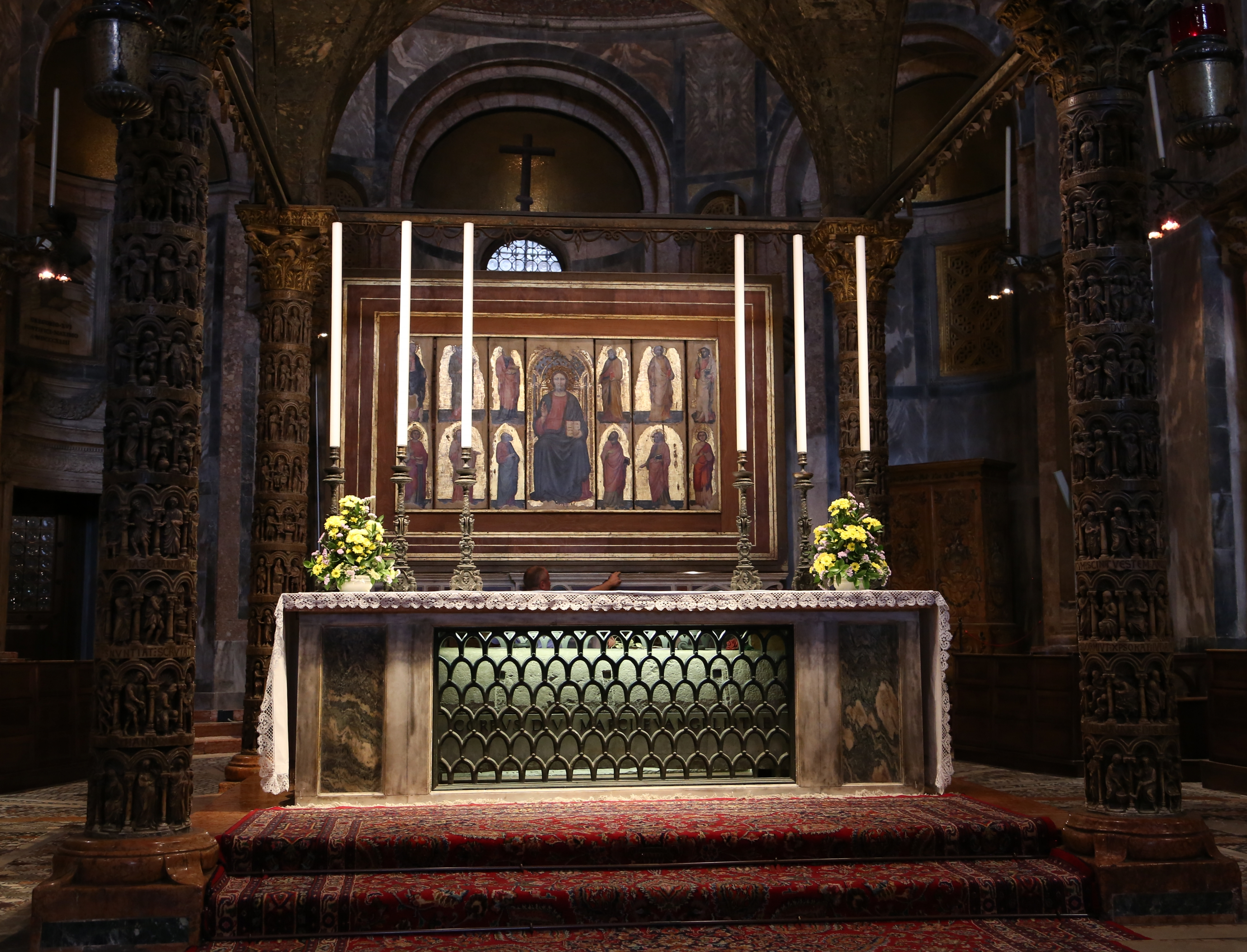
Crypt of St Mark's Basilica (above) where Saint Mark's relics were kept until 1835 when they were moved to the high altar (below)

Saint Mark's relics are recorded in Venice as early as the ninth century in both the will of Doge Giustiniano Participazio (in office 827–829) and the travelogue of a Frankish monk on return from a pilgrimage to the Holy Land. However, the oldest surviving written account of the translatio, the transfer of the relics from Alexandria to Venice, dates only to the eleventh century, although earlier writings evidently existed and were used as sources.

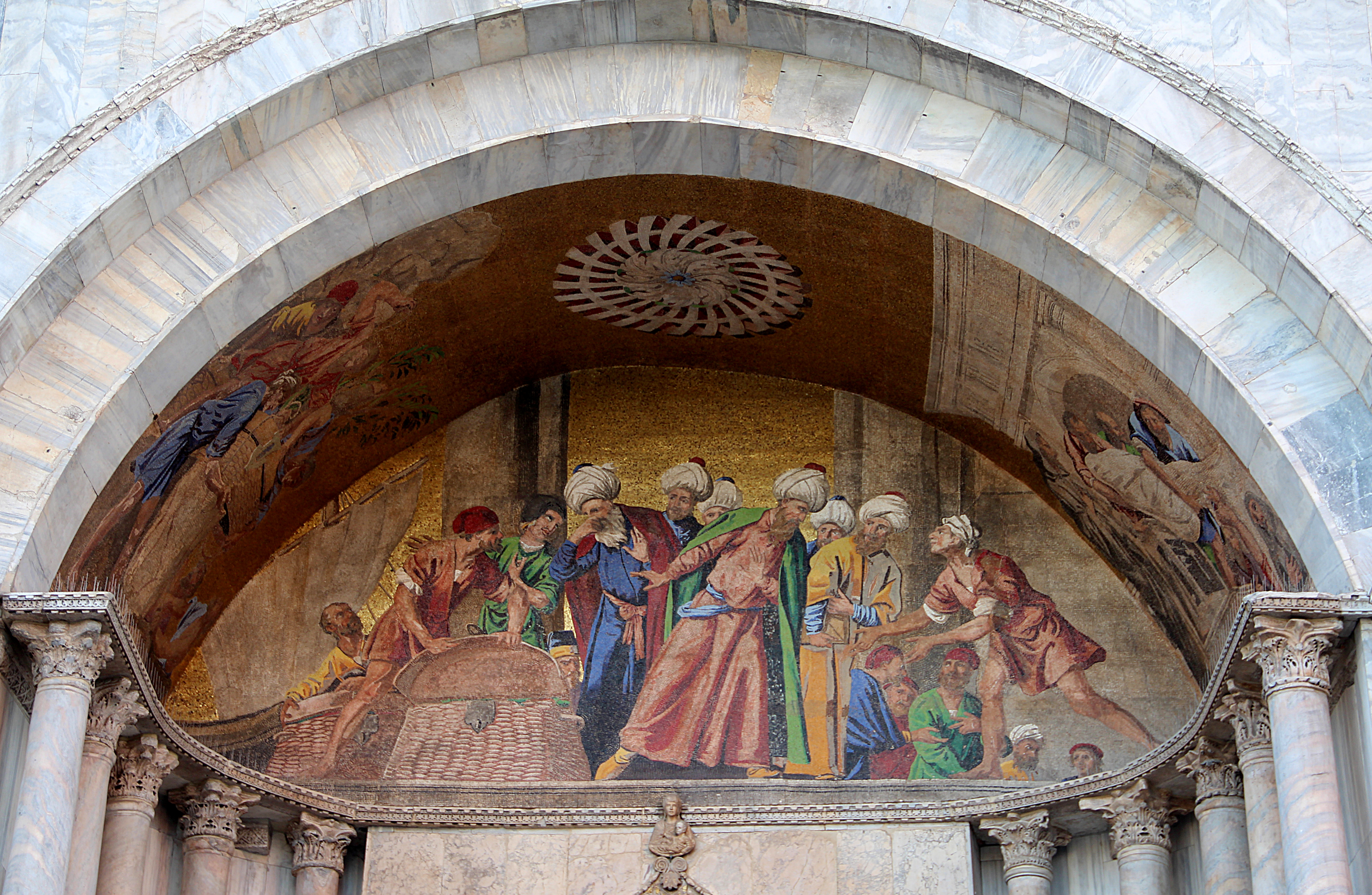
Pietro della Vecchia (cartoons), mosaics on the western façade of St Mark's Basilica (c. 1660): the removal of the body of Saint Mark from Egypt (above) and the arrival of the body in Venice (below)

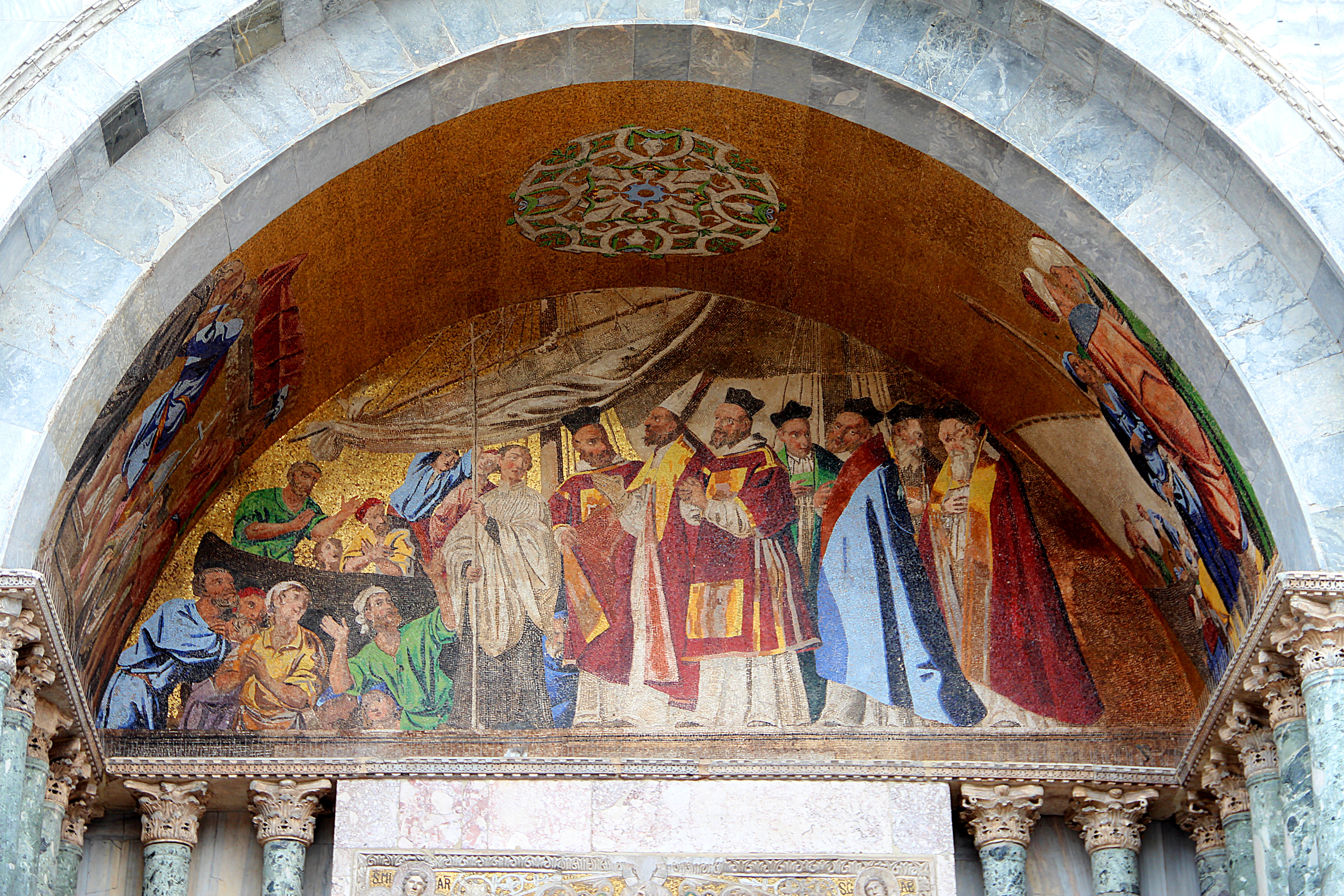

As narrated, a fleet of ten Venetian trading vessels seeks shelter in the Muslim-controlled city of Alexandria during a storm in 828 AD. This is said to be 'by the will of God'; hence there is no intentional violation of the edict of Emperor Leo V that forbids commercial contact with the Muslims. In Alexandria, two of the Venetian merchants, Buono da Malamocco (Metamaucum) and Rustico da Torcello, go daily to pray at the tomb of Saint Mark, located in a church near the port, and there, they make the acquaintance of Theodore and Stauracius, a priest and monk respectively. Theodore, fearful for the dwindling Christian community under Islamic rule, makes it known that the Caliph Al-Ma'mun has ordered the demolition of the church in order to recover building materials for new mosques, and it is suggested that the body of the saint be safely removed to Venice. (Note: In some versions of the translatio the suggestion to remove the body of Saint Mark is made by Theodore, in others by the Venetian merchants. See Edward Muir, Civic Ritual in Renaissance Venice, p. 81, note 42.) To avoid raising suspicion, the body is first substituted with the remains of Saint Claudia, which are present in the church. The relics, placed into a basket and covered in pork, are then successfully smuggled past the Muslim customs officials and embarked on the Venetians' ship, which is preserved from shipwreck during the voyage by Saint Mark who appears and warns the sailors of the imminent danger. Other miracles occur, confirming the authenticity of the relics, until finally the ship arrives in Venice where the body is received by the Bishop of Olivolo and then taken in solemn procession to the Doge.

Independently of the pious inventions, the overall narration serves to justify the right of Venice to possess the relics. It simultaneously affirms the primacy of the Venetian church, the rightful successor of the Patriarchate of Aquileia, even over the ancient metropolitan see of Alexandria. As Buono and Rustico declare, evoking the tradition that Mark preached in northern Italy, the Venetians are the "first-born sons" ("primogeneti filii") of the Evangelist. The translation of the relics to Venice is thus portrayed as a return of Mark to his rightful resting place.

Donald Nicol explained this act as "motivated as much by politics as by piety", and "a calculated stab at the pretensions of the Patriarchate of Aquileia." Instead of being used to adorn the church of Grado, which claimed to possess the throne of Saint Mark, it was kept secretly by Doge Giustiniano Participazio in his modest palace. Possession of Saint Mark's remains was, in Nicol's words, "the symbol not of the Patriarchate of Grado, nor of the bishopric of Olivolo, but of the city of Venice." In his will, Doge Giustiniano asked his widow to build a basilica dedicated to Saint Mark, which was erected between the palace and the chapel of Saint Theodore Stratelates, who until then had been patron saint of Venice.

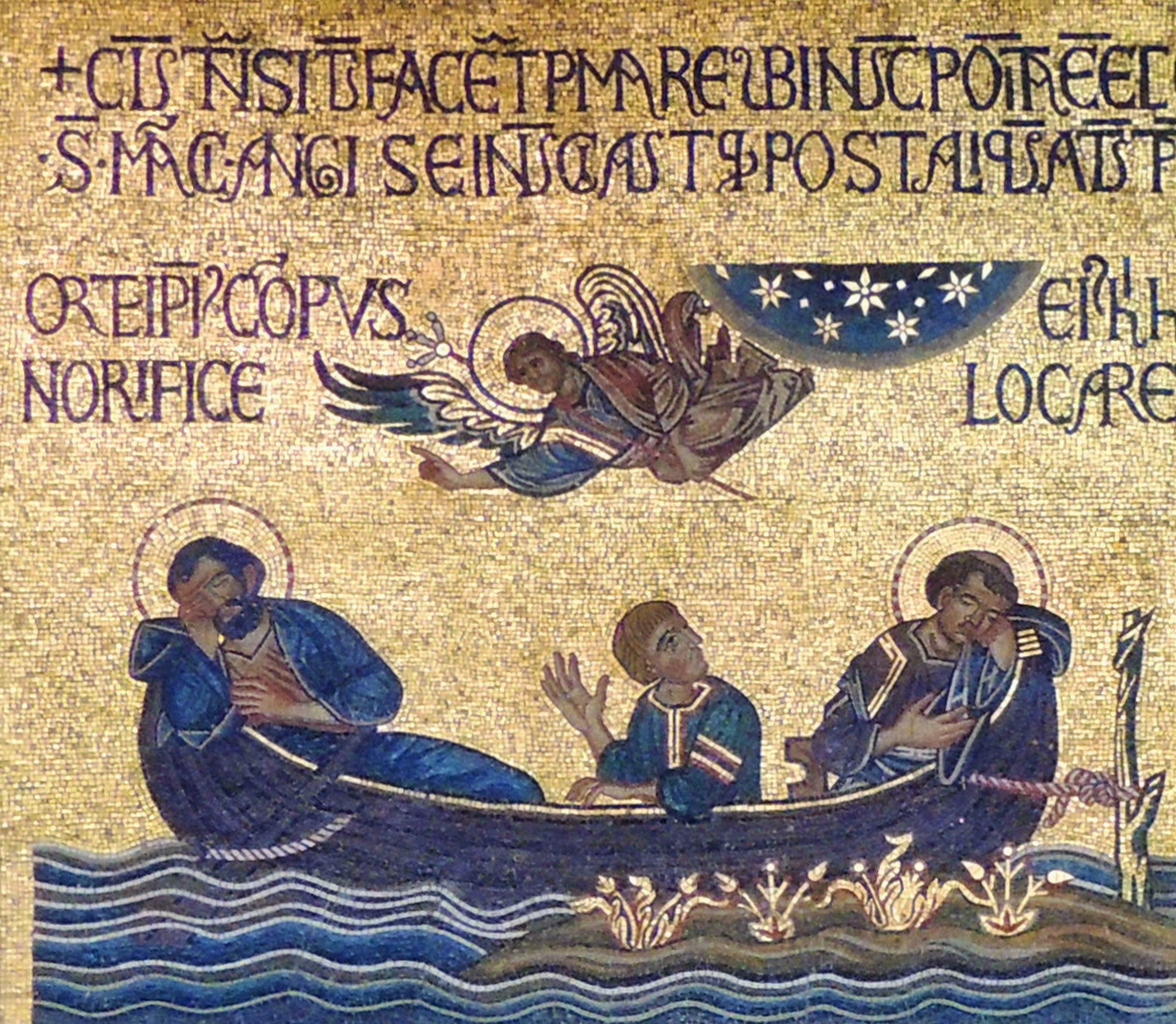
Mosaic (nineteenth-century copy) from the former southern entry of St Mark's Basilica (now Zen Chapel), depicting the praedestinatio (thirteenth century)

==== 'Praedestinatio' ====
With the praedestinatio (also vaticinatio) the possession of Saint Mark's relics by Venice is further legitimized, in this case as the fulfillment of a divine plan. Traceable to Martino da Canal's thirteenth century Cronique des Veniciens, the legend in its definitive form narrates that Saint Mark, after his mission to northern Italy and the evangelization of Aquileia, returns to Rome. Passing through the Venetian Lagoon, he beaches his boat for the night, and he has a vision on the very site of the future city of Venice in which an angel appears, greeting him "Peace to you Mark, my Evangelist" ("Pax tibi Marce evangelista meus"). A prophecy follows announcing that his body will one day find rest in Venice ("Hic requiescet corpus tuum") and that it will be venerated by a virtuous and pious people who will build a glorious and eternal city.

==== 'Inventio' ====
The inventio (also apparitio) confirms the special bond between Saint Mark and the Venetians. The legend concerns the rediscovery of the body at the time of the reconstruction of the church in the eleventh century. Although it is found no earlier than Martino da Canal's thirteenth-century Cronique des Veniciens, it may derive from the actual public exposition of Saint Mark's relics prior to their entombment in the new crypt. (Note: The inventio was consistent with medieval hagiography which often narrated three events for important saints: the martyrdom, the translation of the body, and the miraculous rediscovery of the relics. See Edward Muir, Civic Ritual in Renaissance Venice, p. 87. The relics of Saint Luke were similarly rediscovered at the Church of Saint Justine in Padua on 14 April 1117. See Joseph M. Holden, The Harvest Handbook of Apologetics (Eugene, Oregon: Harvest House Publishers, 2018), pp. 207–208 ISBN 9780736974288. See also Elena Ene Draghici-Vasilescu's discussion on the legendary rediscovery of sacred relics in 'The Church of San Marco...', p. 701, note 20.) As narrated, the body of Saint Mark is hidden to prevent theft during work on the church, and after years all knowledge of its hiding place, known only to the Doge and a few trusted officials, is lost. Finally, after three days of fasting and prayer, an earthquake breaks open a pillar, revealing the body, which in later variations reaches out to the pious Venetians.

== Braga (Portugal) ==
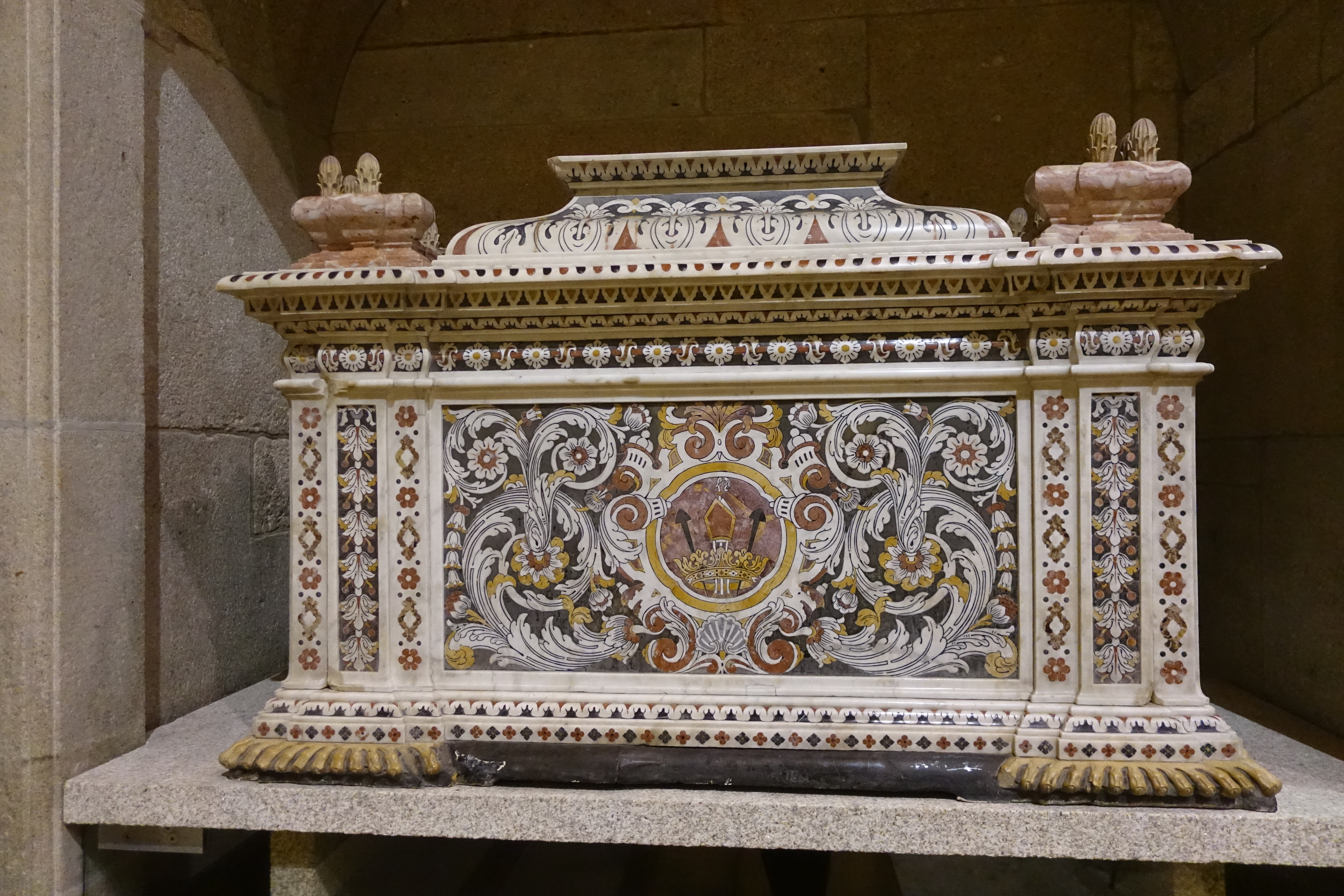

In Braga (Portugal) there is a tomb in Saint Mark's church attributed to Saint Mark.

== See also ==
- St Mark's Basilica
