= Peter Fraser (classicist) =

British historian (1918–2007)

Peter Fraser MC FBA
- Born: Peter Marshall Fraser; 6 April 1918
- Died: 15 September 2007 (aged 89)
- Resting place: British Military Cemetery, Cephalonia
- Other name: P. M. Fraser
- Education: City of London School; Brasenose College, Oxford
- Title: Director of the British School at Athens
- Term: 1968 to 1971
- Predecessor: Peter Megaw
- Successor: Hector Catling
- Awards: Fellow of the British Academy (FBA)
- Military career
- Allegiance: United Kingdom
- Branch: British Army
- Service years: 1941–1945
- Rank: Captain
- Service number: 201494
- Units: Seaforth Highlanders; Special Operations Executive
- Conflicts: World War II; *Greek Resistance
- Awards: Military Cross

Peter Marshall Fraser, MC, FBA (6 April 1918 – 15 September 2007) was a classical scholar and historian specialising in the Hellenistic age of Greece. He was a Fellow of All Souls College, Oxford and acting Warden of the college from 1985 to 1987. He served as Director of the British School at Athens from 1968 to 1971.

== Early life ==
Fraser was born on 6 April 1918. He was brought up in Carshalton, Surrey. He was educated at the City of London School, boys' private day school in the City of London, England. He won a classical scholarship to Brasenose College, Oxford where he studied for mods the first part of Literae Humaniores. His studies were interrupted by his military service in World War II. He returned to Oxford after the war. He wrote a thesis on Hellenistic Rhodes, which he entered for and won the prestigious Conington Prize.

== Military service ==
With World War II interrupting his studies, Fraser joined the Seaforth Highlanders, British Army in 1941. He was commissioned as a second lieutenant on 16 August 1941, having attended an Officer Cadet Training Unit. He was given the service number 201494.

It was because of his knowledge and interest in Classical Greece, that he was recruited by the Special Operations Executive. Between 1943 and 1945, he was involved in the British Military Mission to Axis occupied Greece. On 12 July 1943, he parachuted into Greece near the town of Kalamata. He gradually moved through the Peloponnese to the Argolis and Corinthia Prefecture. There he spent the winter of 1943 and the spring of 1944. His mission was to arm and assist the 'officer bands', the non-communist guerilla groups. However, the pre-existing structure of the Greek People's Liberation Army meant that by October 1943 only the communist resistance were strong enough to continue the fight against the occupiers. Fraser described his relationship with the EAM-ELAS as "the worst, since my original mission in that area was to try to find and, having found, to arm non-ELAS 'andartes' ".

In 1944, he led a raid on a Nazi airfield near Argos, resulting in its successful destruction. By the end of the war, he was effectively the commander of Volos.

== Academic career ==
In 1948, Fraser was made University Lecturer in Hellenistic History at the University of Oxford. As he was not made a fellow of one of the colleges at this time, he did not undertake tutorial teaching, but focused on research and lecturing. In the early 1950s, he taught undergraduates, including George Forrest, early Roman history from a Greek perspective. In 1954, he was appointed Fellow of All Souls College, the post-graduate only college, where he would supervise doctoral students. He supervised Fergus Millar during his D. Phil. Fraser was promoted to Reader in Hellenistic History in 1964. He gave the 1970 Master-Mind Lecture. He retired from his university lecture post in 1985 and from his college fellowship in 1987.

He held a number of college appointments at All Souls. He was Domestic Bursar between 1962 and 1965. He was Sub-Warden from 1980 to 1982, and from 1985 to 1987, served as acting warden of the college. He held the position in place of Patrick Neill during the first two years of his period as Vice-Chancellor.

He held a number of positions outside the University of Oxford. He succeeded Peter Megaw in 1968 as director of the British School at Athens. He held the position to 1971. He was Visiting Professor of Classical Studies at Indiana University Bloomington for the academic year 1973 to 1974. He chaired the Society of Afghan Studies from 1972 to 1982.

== Later life ==
Fraser was made an Emeritus Fellow of All Souls College, Oxford in 1995, a position he held till his death.

He died on 15 September 2007, at the age of 89. He was survived by his six children and his third wife. His ashes were interred in the British Military Cemetery on the Greek island of Cephalonia.

His grave stone states:

Peter Marshall Fraser MC

6.4.1918 – 15.8.2007

Scholar

Yet leaving here a name I trust

That will not perish in the dust

== Works ==
Three-volume Ptolemaic Alexandria, published in 1972, is considered Fraser's magnum opus, and called "the standard study of Alexander’s greatest foundation".

It received positive reviews; one reviewer called it "as complete a history as the evidence permits" of Alexandria:

To fit the scattered pieces into a pattern over a field ranging from topography, politics and institutions, through the city's commercial and religious life, to its achievement in medicine, the sciences, scholarship, philosophy, and literature that was a task for a modern Eratosthenes, a polymath of painstaking genius

The first volume is text (800 pages), the second is notes (1116 pages), and the third is index (157 pages). The quality of print was criticized as not on par with the scholarship.

In 1996, Fraser published Cities of Alexander the Great, a reviewer found it to be "not an easy book; it makes few concessions to the reader".

== Personal life ==
Fraser married three times and had six children. He first marriage was in 1940 to Catharine Heaton-Renshaw. They had four children together; one son and three daughters. They divorced. His second marriage was to Ruth Elsbeth Renfer in 1955. Together they had two sons. His final marriage was to Barbara Ann Stewart in 1973. They did not have children.

One of his sons by Ruth, Alex Fraser (born 23 July 1959), followed his father into the academic world and is currently chief operating officer of the Cass Business School, City University London.

== Honours ==
On 4 January 1945, Fraser was awarded the Military Cross (MC) 'in recognition of gallant and distinguished services in the field'.

In 1960, he was elected Fellow of the British Academy (FBA). He was awarded a number of honorary degrees: in 1984, an Honorary Doctor of Philosophy (Dr. Phil) by the University of Trier; in 1996, an Honorary Doctor of Letters (DLitt) by La Trobe University; and in 2002 an Honorary Doctor of Philosophy (DPhil) by the University of Athens.

Academic offices
Preceded by Peter Megaw	Director of the British School at Athens; 1968 to 1971	Succeeded by Hector Catling
