= Huzaifah =

Huzaifah or Hudhaifah is a given name and surname of Arabic origin. Notable people with the name include:

== Given name ==
- Hudhayfa ibn al-Ahwas al-Qaysi, governor of al-Andalus in 728
- Huzaifah Aziz (born 1994), Singaporean footballer
- Hudhayfah al-Bariqi, companion of Muhammad and governor of Oman
- Abu Huzaifa al-Kanadi (born 1994/95), also known as Shehroze Chaudhry, a Canadian self-described member of the Islamic State
- Abu Hudhaifah ibn al-Mughirah or Sumayya (550–615), a companion of Muhammad
- Hudhayfah ibn al-Yaman (died 656), a companion (sahabah) of prophet Muhammad

== Surname ==
- Abd Allah ibn Hudhafa (died 653), a companion of Muhammad
- Khunays ibn Hudhafa (died 624), a companion of Muhammad
- Muhammad ibn Abi Hudhayfa (died 657), became governor of Egypt in 656
