= Al-As ibn Wa'il =

Quraysh nobility and Father of Amr ibn al-'As

Al-As ibn Wa'il as-Sahmi العاص بن وائل السهمي
- Quraysh Chief of the Banu Sahm
- Leadership: Late 6th century – 610s
- Predecessor: Wa'il al-Sahmi (early 6th century)
- Successor: Amr ibn al-As (610s–629)
- Born: later 5th-century Mecca, Hejaz, Arabia
- Died: 570; Mecca, Hejaz, Arabia
- Children: Amr, Hisham

Al-As ibn Wa'il as-Sahmi (Arabic: العاص بن وائل السهمي) was one of the member of pre-Islamic Arab nobility of Quraysh tribe in Mecca, a contemporary of Muhammad and the father of a major Companion of Muhammad, 'Amr ibn al-'As, who conquered Egypt thrice and was involved in the Islamic conquest of the Levant, and Hisham ibn al-A'as.

== Biography ==
The Hilf al-Fudul was set in place at during one occasion due to him, in order to bring back justice to a Yemeni merchant and those without protection in Makkan society. A Yemeni merchant from Zabid had sold some goods to al-As ibn Wa'il al-Sahmi (the father of Amr ibn al-As). Having taken possession of the goods, the Qurayshi refused to pay the agreed price, knowing that the merchant had no confederate or kinsman in Mecca whom he could count upon for help. The Yemeni merchant, instead of letting it pass, appealed to the Quraysh to see that justice was done. But due to al-As ibn Wa'il's preeminent place among the Quraysh, they refused to help the Yemeni merchant. So the merchant went to the mountain Abi Qubays to recite poems asking for justice :

ô the people unjusted in their trade, in the heart of Mecca, distant from home and people
A portected transgressed, who did not spend his days, ô the men between al hijr and the stone
The interdiction for whose honnor is achieved, no interdiction for the immoral treachery

— Sira Al Nabawiyya, in Ibn Kathir,

His wife was Layla bint Harmalah belong to the influential Anaza Arab tribe, She probably arrived in Mecca initially as a captive due to Arab tribal raids, however al-As freed her and took her for himself. She was the mother of Amr ibn al-As, who was born in c. 573. al-As ibn Wa'il, was a wealthy landowner from the Banu Sahm clan of the Quraysh tribe of Mecca. Following the death of al-As in c. 622, his son Amr inherited from him the lucrative al-Waht estate and vineyards near Ta'if. Amr's mother and Al-As's wife was from the Banu Jallan clan of the Annazah tribe.

Surat al-Kawthar is the 108th surah of the Qur'an, and the shortest. According to Ibn Ishaq, it was revealed in Makka, some time before the Isra and Miraj, when Al-As said of Muhammad that he was "a man who is cut off (from having a male progenitor) is of no consequence, and if he were killed, he would be forgotten."

He never became a Muslim and left a will to his two sons.

== See also ==
- Abd Allah ibn Amr ibn al-As

== Sources ==
- Wensinck, A. J. (1960). "ʿAmr b. al-ʿĀṣ al-Sahmī". In Gibb, H. A. R.; Kramers, J. H.; Lévi-Provençal, E.; Schacht, J.; Lewis, B. & Pellat, Ch. (eds.). The Encyclopaedia of Islam, Second Edition. Volume I: A–B. Leiden: E. J. Brill. p. 451. OCLC 495469456.
- Lecker, Michael (1989). "The Estates of 'Amr b. al-'Āṣ in Palestine: Notes on a New Negev Arabic Inscription". Bulletin of the School of Oriental and African Studies, University of London. 52 (1): 24–37. doi:10.1017/S0041977X00023041. JSTOR 617911.
- Raisuddin, Abu Nayeem Muhammad (April 1981). "Amr ibn al-As and His Conquest of Egypt". Islamic Culture. 55 (4): 277–290.

=== External links ===
- http://www.islaam.net/main/display.php?id=1126&category=13
