= Hilf al-Fudul =

7th-century alliance in Mecca, Saudi Arabia

Hilf al-Fudul (Arabic: حلف الفضول) was an alliance or confederacy created in Mecca in the year 590 AD, to establish justice for all through collective action, especially for those who were not under the protection of any clan. Because of Muhammad's role in its formation, the alliance plays a significant role in Islamic ethics. Because fudul commonly means "virtuous" the alliance is often translated as League of the Virtuous.

== Historical background ==
The pact, or hilf in Arabic, took place one month after the end of the Fijar Wars, in month of Dhu al-Qi'da. Montgomery Watt notes that the war resulted in Meccan control of the commercial road between Iraq and al-Hirah.

Martin Lings notes the historical importance of a justice system in Mecca. In the years preceding the pact, the Quraysh were involved in intermittent conflicts. The war, as usual, was a result of an unsettled murder. The effect was growing discontent with the form of justice that required fake war. Many Quraysh leaders had travelled to Syria, where they found relative justice prevailed. Similar conditions also existed in Abyssinia. No such system, however, existed in Arabia.

The principle of hilf was established previously by Hashim ibn Abd Manaf as a way to set up new alliances between merchants of similar power, whether they be Meccans or foreigners. It allowed the formation of alliances outside of Mecca and the modification of the balance of power with respect to trade inside Mecca. Hilf sometimes resulted in the formation of new tribes, as with the Banu Hashim. Those transformations reshaped the traditional tribe colonisation and the social relations in Mecca.

== Formation ==
A Yemeni merchant from Zabid had sold some goods to al-As ibn Wa'il al-Sahmi (the father of Amr ibn al-As). Having taken possession of the goods, the Qurayshi refused to pay the agreed price, knowing that the merchant had no confederate or kinsman in Mecca whom he could count upon for help. The Yemeni merchant, instead of letting it pass, appealed to the Quraysh to see that justice was done. But due to al-As ibn Wa'il's preeminent place among the Quraysh, they refused to help the Yemeni merchant. So the merchant went to the mountain Abi Qubays to recite poems asking for justice :

ô the people unjusted in their trade, in the heart of Mecca, distant from home and people
A portected transgressed, who did not spend his days, ô the men between al hijr and the stone
The interdiction for whose honnor is achieved, no interdiction for the immoral treachery

— Sira Al Nabawiyya, in Ibn Kathir,

Al-Zubayr ibn ‘Abd al-Muttalib, Muhammad's uncle, is believed to have been the first to call for a pact. Muhammad, took part in the hilf. A few clans met in Dar al-Nadwa, a building north of the Kaaba, the gathering place of the clan's leader (malaʾ), where they decided to take up the defense of the Yemeni merchant and to cover his losses. A meeting was hosted at the house of Abd Allah ibn Jad'an. At the meeting, various chiefs and members of tribes pledged to assist anyone who was treated unjustly, to collectively intervene in conflicts to establish justice and to defend people who were foreigners in Mecca or who were not under the protection of a clan: Al-Zubayr b. c Abd al-Muttalib spoke the following verses about this pact:

"I swore, Let's make a pact against them, though we're all members of one tribe.
We'll call it al-fudul; if we make a pact by it the stranger could overcome those under local protection,
And those who go around the ka'ba will know that we reject injustice and will prevent all things shameful."

And after :

"Al-fudul made a pact and alliance that no evildoer shall dwell in Mecca's heart.
This was a matter they firmly agreed and so the protected neighbour and the
unprotected stranger are safe among them."

— Sira Al Nabawiyya, in Ibn Kathir,

To make the pact imperative and sacred, the members went into the Ka'aba and poured water into the receptacle so it flowed on the Black Stone. Thereupon each man drank from it. Then they raised their right hands above their heads to show they would stand together in this endeavor. The pact was written and placed inside the Ka'aba, the place where the participants believed it would be under the protection of God.

They retrieved the goods from al-As ibn Wa'il. Another aspect of the pact was that it would open up the Meccan market to Yemenite merchants, who were hitherto excluded.

== Clans involved ==
The following clans joined this pact : Banu Hashim, Banu Zuhra, Banu Muttalib, Banu Asad and Banu Taym. Montgomery Watt notes the continuity with the previous hilf al-Muthayyabun during the conflict for Qusay's succession. It featured the same opposing groups of clans, with a group of clans known as the Hilf al-Muthayyabun opposing the Banu Makhzum and the Banu Sahm, grouped in the Ahlaf. An exception to this were the Banu Nawfal and the powerful 'Abd Shams (Banu Umayya), that had become wealthy from their commercial enterprise, split from the Muṭayyabūn faction in 605 and engaged in business with the Aḥlāf.

According to Watt, the fact that Makhzum and 'Abd Shams had taken control of the trade routes with Yemen following the Fijar war meant that lesser clans would be excluded from commerce with Yemen if Yemeni merchants were to stop coming to Mecca. This would explain the necessity for them to defend the Yemeni merchant. He also notes that the same clans remained in conflict until the Battle of Badr, where all Meccan leaders belonged to the same clans who opposed the Hilf al Fudul.

== Legacy ==
That pact marked the beginning of some notion of justice in Mecca, which would be later repeated by Muhammad when he would preach Islam. Later on, after proclaiming Islam, Muhammad still acknowledged the validity and value of the pact, despite most of its members being non-Muslim. Abu Bakr is also said to have agreed to this pact. This presumption is based on the fact that Abdullah ibn Jad'an, whose house was the venue for this pledge, was Abu Bakr's fellow clansman.

In the time of the first Umayyad caliph Mu'awiya, the governor of Medina al-Walid ibn Utba ibn Abi Sufyan ('Abd Shams), who was a nephew of the caliph, committed an injustice to Husayn ibn Ali. Husayn threatened to take the case to the members of Hilf al-Fudul. As influential Meccans like Abdullah ibn al-Zubayr (Assad), al-Miswar ibn Makhrama (al-Zuhri) and Abd al-Rahman ibn Awf (al-Taymi) swore to help Husayn in agreement with the pact, the Umayyad governor stepped back, afraid of the possible consequences.

=== Islamic ethics ===
Anas Malik sees the pact as an example of libertarianism in Islam, and Anthony Sullivan considers it as a support for Muslim democrats.

The pact holds significance in Islamic ethics. According to Anthony Sullivan, the pact represents Islam's interest in human rights and protection of such rights. Later on, Muhammad even accepted the substance of the agreement made by primarily non-Muslims. Tariq Ramadan draws three principles from this:

- Islam embraces values derived from the human conscience, that are outside of the Islamic tradition. This is because Muhammad had acknowledged a pact before revelation, in the pre-Islamic era.
- Islam acknowledges the righteousness of non-Muslims. In this case, the non-Muslims had defended justice and the oppressed.
- Islam, instead of building allegiance to a closed community, requires allegiance to a set of universal principles. The message of Islam is not a closed value system, or at variance or conflict with other value systems.

== See also ==
- Muhammad in Mecca
