= Al-Nabigha bint Harmala =

Mother of Amr ibn al-As

Salma bint Harmalah
- Born: Northern Arabia
- Died: Mecca, Arabia
- Other names: Al-Nābiġah
- Children: Amr ibn al-As, Uqba ibn Nafi see more below
- Parent: Harmalah
- Family: Anazzah tribe

Salma bint Harmalah also known as Al-Nābiġah (Arabic: النابغة; lit. 'genius') was the mother of the prominent Sahaba Amr ibn al-A'as. She lived during the 6th century and was a contemporary of the Islamic prophet Muhammad. Her son Amr become Muslim in 630s and came to be one of the greatest Muslim military leaders.

== Biography ==
Salma bint Harmalah was born in the Anazzah tribe, it was an Arabian tribe in the Northern Arabian Peninsula (now part of Northern Saudi Arabia)

She was the mother of Amr ibn al-As, who was born in c. 573. His father, al-As ibn Wa'il, was a wealthy landowner from the Banu Sahm clan of the Quraysh tribe of Mecca. Following the death of al-As in c. 622, Amr inherited from him the lucrative al-Waht estate and vineyards near Ta'if. Amr's mother was bint Harmalah from the Banu Jallan clan of the Anaza tribe.

Salma bint Harmalah had been taken captive and sold, in succession, to several members of the Quraysh, one of whom was Amr's father. As such, Amr had two maternal half-brothers, Amr ibn Atatha of the Banu Adi and Uqba ibn Nafi of the Banu Fihr, and a half-sister from the Banu Abd Shams. Her famous son, Amr is physically described in the traditional sources as being short with broad shoulders, having a large head with a wide forehead and wide mouth, long arms and a long beard.

Salma bint Harmalah died before or shortly after the start of Advent of Islam.

== Sources ==
- Wensinck, A. J. (1960). "ʿAmr b. al-ʿĀṣ al-Sahmī". In Gibb, H. A. R.; Kramers, J. H.; Lévi-Provençal, E.; Schacht, J.; Lewis, B. & Pellat, Ch. (eds.). The Encyclopaedia of Islam, Second Edition. Volume I: A–B. Leiden: E. J. Brill. p. 451. OCLC 495469456.
- Lecker, Michael (1989). "The Estates of 'Amr b. al-'Āṣ in Palestine: Notes on a New Negev Arabic Inscription". Bulletin of the School of Oriental and African Studies, University of London. 52 (1): 24–37. doi:10.1017/S0041977X00023041. JSTOR 617911.
- Raisuddin, Abu Nayeem Muhammad (April 1981). "Amr ibn al-As and His Conquest of Egypt". Islamic Culture. 55 (4): 277–290.
- Lecker, Michael (1987). "A Note on Early Marriage Links between Qurashīs and Jewish Women". Jerusalem Studies in Arabic and Islam. 10: 17–40.
