= Hisham ibn al-As =

Companion (Sahabi) of Muhammad

Hishām ibn al-ʿĀṣ (Arabic: هشام بن العاص), is the son of Al-As ibn Wa'il of Banu Sahm and brother of Amr ibn al-As and one of the early companions. It is known that he embraced Islam before Hijrah as can be traced from the saying of Umar, yet his exact year of becoming Muslim is unknown. Hisham attempted to migrate to Medina along with Umar but his plans were foiled by his family. Later he succeeded in migrate to Medina along with Ayash.

He freed 50 slaves in accordance with his father's will.

He was killed in the Battle of Yarmouk in the year 13 AH (635 CE).

== See also ==
- Companions of the Prophet
- Hisham (name)
