= Siege of Pelusium (640) =

639–640 siege

- Part of the Arab conquest of Egypt (Arab–Byzantine wars)
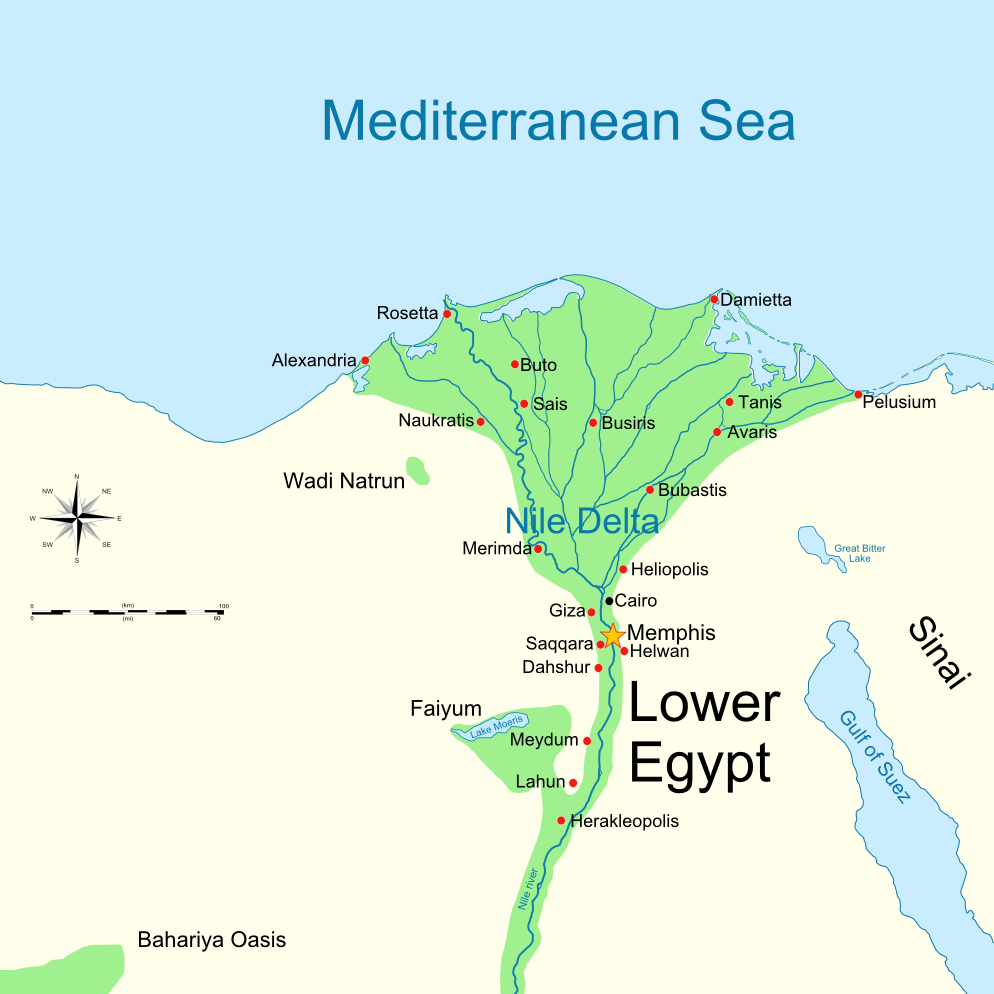
Date	December 639 – February 640
Location	Pelusium, Egypt 31.042°N 32.540°E
Result	Rashidun victory

Belligerents
Rashidun Caliphate	Byzantine Empire

Commanders and leaders
Amr ibn al-As; Huzaifa ibn Wala'	Theodore

Strength
4,000 men	Unknown

Casualties and losses
Heavy	Heavy

The Siege of Pelusium was a military engagement between the Rashidun army under Amr ibn al-As and the Byzantine garrison of Pelusium. After a siege of two months, the Muslims captured the city, which gave the Muslims their first hold in Egypt.

== Background ==
Egypt was long under Roman rule for centuries after conquering it from the Ptolemaic Kingdom. By the early 7th century, the Byzantine Empire was weakened by the devastating long war of 602–628 with the Sasanian Empire. Byzantium at the time of early Muslim conquests was healing its wounds after their long war. Egypt at that time was in religious strife between the Chalcedonian Byzantines and the native Copts. A new power emerged in the Arabian Peninsula called the Rashidun Caliphate, which began conquering the Levant from the Byzantines after their victory at Yarmuk. The Muslims began setting their eyes on the Byzantine province of Egypt.

In December of 639, the Rashidun Caliph Umar dispatched the Muslim companion and general Amr ibn al-As to Egypt with a force of 4,000 Arabs, which also included Byzantine and Persian converts. After it was dispatched, the caliph reconsidered sending more reinforcements since it would be impossible for a small force to conquer Egypt. After the Muslims reached Egypt, they managed to easily conquer Arish, which lacked a Byzantine garrison. The native inhabitants there declared their allegiance to the Muslims with terms. After celebrating Eid al-Adha there, the Muslims departed towards Alexandria.

== Siege ==
During their march to Alexandria, the Muslims stopped at the fortified city of Pelusium. The ancient, heavily guarded city was home to churches, monasteries, and ancient Egyptian monuments. It was also the most important location on Egypt's eastern side, controlling the coast, the desert approaches, and a waterway that led into the Delta. The Byzantine garrison was led by Theodore, the governor of Egypt. The Muslim force was few in number and had no siege engines, so they were forced to take the fort either by storm or starvation. The Muslims cut off the city's supplies, gradually wearing down its garrison. The Byzantines launched frequent sallies. After one or two months of fighting, the Byzantines made a last sortie, which was repelled by the Muslims. One of the Muslim commanders called Huzaifa ibn Wala' seized one of the gates during the garrison retreat, which allowed the Muslims to capture the city. The city fell in February of 640.

== Aftermath ==
The conquest of Pelusium paved the way for further conquests in Egypt. By the capture of Pelusium, the Muslim forces had now secured their only line of communication and retreat in case of disaster. The Muslims realized that without their promised reinforcements, they would fail. Amr was forced to demolish Pelusium's defenses so as to leave it useless. The Arabs were later reinforced with another 4,000 men.

== Sources ==
- Robert Morgan (2016), History of the Coptic Orthodox People and the Church of Egypt.
- Mohammad Tazeem (2025), Empire Founders: The Khalfas Triumph And Legacy In Islam.
- Alfred J. Butler (1902), The Arab conquest of Egypt and the last thirty years of the Roman dominion.
