= Battle of Dathin =

634 battle between the Byzantine Empire and Rashidun Caliphate

- Part of the Arab–Byzantine wars
| Date | 4 February 634 |
| Location | Dathin, near Gaza, Palaestina Prima |
| Result | Rashidun victory |

Belligerents
| Rashidun Caliphate | Byzantine Empire |

Commanders and leaders
| 'Amr ibn al-'As | Dux Sergius † |

Strength
| 8,000 | Outnumbered |

Casualties and losses
| Unknown | 300 |
- 4,000 civilian deaths

The Battle of Dathin (Arabic: داثن) took place during the Arab–Byzantine Wars between the Rashidun Caliphate and the Byzantine Empire in February 634, which became very famous in the literature of the period.

AG 945, indiction VII: On Friday, 4 February, [i.e., 634 CE / Dhul Qa'dah 12 AH] at the ninth hour, there was a battle between the Romans and the Arabs of Maḥmet [Syr. tayyāyē d-MḤMT] in Palestine twelve miles east of Gaza. The Romans fled, leaving behind the patrician Jordan (Syr. BRYRDN), whom the Arabs killed. Some 40,000 [according to the original edition, but the more recent English translation reads "4000" without comment] poor villagers of Palestine were killed there, Christians, Jews and Samaritans. The Arabs ravaged the whole region.

—

AG 947, indiction IX: The Arabs invaded the whole of Syria and went down to Persia and conquered it; the Arabs climbed mountain of Mardin and killed many monks there in [the monasteries of] Qedar and Bnata (Benōthō). There died the blessed man Simon, doorkeeper of Qedar, brother of Thomas the priest.

The battle took place following a series of Arab raids around Gaza. The Byzantine commander (dux and candidatus) Sergius assembled a small detachment of soldiers (due to a shortage of troops), and led that mounted army from his base at Caesarea some 125 kilometers south to the vicinity of Gaza. From there he proceeded against an Arab force that was numerically superior and commanded by 'Amr ibn al-'As. The opposing forces met at the village of Dathin on February 4, not far from Gaza. The Byzantines were defeated and the candidatus Sergius himself was killed, together with 300 of his soldiers. The battle also claimed the lives of 4,000 civilians (40,000 according to the original edition).

According to the near-contemporary Doctrina Jacobi nuper baptizati, the Muslim victory was celebrated by the local Jews, who had been a persecuted minority within the Roman Empire.
