= Sahifah al-Sadiqah =

- Author: Abd Allah ibn Amr ibn al-As
- Language: Arabic
- Genre: Hadith collection

Sahifah al-Sadiqah (Arabic: الصحيفة الصادقة, romanized: The Truthful Script) is a collection of hadith compiled by sahaba Abd Allah ibn Amr ibn al-As, often called the first book of hadith. The book was not preserved, but some hadiths in Musnad Ahmad by Imam Hanbal (9th century) are believed to be from the Sahifa al-Sadiqa.

== See also ==
- List of hadith books
