= Al-Kawthar =

108th chapter of the Qur'an

Surah 108 of the Quran
ٱلْكَوْثَر Al-Kawthar Abundance
- Qira'ah; English text
- Classification: Meccan
- Other names: Bounty, Plenty, Good in Abundance
- Position: Juzʼ 30
- No. of verses: 3
- No. of words: 10

Al-Kawthar (Arabic: الكوثر, lit. 'Abundance') is the 108th chapter (sūrah) of the Quran. It is the shortest chapter, consisting of three ayat or verses:

۝ Verily, We have granted you abundance.
۝ So pray to your Lord and sacrifice [to Him alone].
۝ Indeed, your enemy is the one cut off.

There are several opinions regarding its timing and contextual background of revelation (asbāb al-nuzūl). According to Ibn Ishaq, it is an early Meccan surah, revealed in Mecca.

The word Kawthar is derived from the triliteral root ك - ث - ر (k - th - r), meaning "to increase, to be plentiful, abundance." It appears in the Qur'an solely in this sūrah.

== Text and transliteration ==
=== Arabic Text (Hafs) ===
بِسمِ ٱللَّهِ ٱلرَّحمَـٰنِ ٱلرَّحِیمِ
Bismi l-lāhi r-raḥmāni r-raḥīm(i)
إِنَّآ أَعطَینَـٰكَ ٱلكَوثَرَ ۝١
¹ ʾinnā ʾaʿṭaynāka l-kawthar(a)
فَصَلِّ لِرَبِّكَ وَٱنحَر ۝٢
² Faṣalli lirabbika wanḥar
إِنَّ شَانِئَكَ هُوَ ٱلأَبتَرُ ۝٣
³ ʾinna shāniʾaka huwa l-ʾabtar(u)

== Meanings ==
=== Sahih International ===
1. Indeed, We have granted you, [O Muhammad], al-Kawthar.
2. So pray to your Lord and sacrifice [to Him alone].
3. Indeed, your enemy is the one cut off.

=== Yusuf Ali ===
1. To thee have We granted the Fount (of Abundance).
2. Therefore, to thy Lord turn in Prayer and Sacrifice.
3. For he who hateth thee, he will be cut off (from Future Hope).

=== Pickthall ===
1. Lo! We have given thee Abundance;
2. So pray unto thy Lord, and sacrifice.
3. Lo! it is thy insulter (and not thou) who is without posterity.

== The Circumstances of the Revelation of Al-Kawthar ==
Ibn Abbas, Mujahid, Sa'id ibn Jubayr and Qatadah said: “This verse was revealed about Al-As ibn Wa'il. He said about the Prophet: "Leave him alone, for he is a man without descendants and has no children. When he dies, he will no longer be remembered." So God revealed this Surah. It is also narrated from Ata that this Surah was revealed about Abu Lahab, when one of the sons of the Messenger of God died. Abu Lahab went to the polytheists and said, "Tonight, Muhammad has been left without a descendants. Following this statement, God revealed this verse: “Indeed, your enemy is himself cut off.

== Hadith ==
- Imam Ahmad recorded from Anas bin Malik that a man said, "O Messenger of Allah! What is Al-Kawthar?" He replied: "It is a river in Paradise which my Lord has given me."
- Narrated by Ibn 'Abbas: "The word 'Al-Kauthar' means the abundant good which Allah gave to the Prophet."
- Narrated Abu Huraira: "There is a garden from the gardens of Paradise between my house and my pulpit, and my pulpit is on my Lake Fount (Al-Kauthar)."

== See also ==
- Pond of Abundance (Kawthar)
