= Raid of Dhat al-Salasil =

7th-century battle of the Arab-Byzantine wars

Expedition of Amr ibn al-As
- Part of the Arab-Byzantine wars
| Date | September 629 AD, 8AH, 6th month |
| Location | Dhat as-Salasil |
| Result | Decisive Muslim victory |

Belligerents
| First Islamic State | Byzantine Empire; Banu Quda'a |

Commanders and leaders
| Amr ibn al-As | Unknown |

Strength
| 300 initially, 500 during battle | Thousands |

Casualties and losses
| Very light | Heavy |

Expedition of Amr ibn al-As, also known as the Campaign of Dhat as-Salasil, took place in September 629 AD, 8AH, 6th month, of the Islamic Calendar.

== Background ==
After a prior defeat of the Muslims at the Battle of Mu’tah, many Ghassanid-affiliated tribes sensed an opportunity to make their own move. The Banu Quda'a began planning a massive invasion against the Muslims in the capital of Medina. Muslim spies immediately alerted Muhammad, causing an emergency council to be summoned.

Muhammad appointed Amr ibn al-As to lead a preemptive expedition against the tribe of Banu Quda'a. He was chosen presumably of his relations with the Bali tribe, who were located near the theatre of operations.

The contingent consisted of three hundred men and thirty horses with Amr ibn al-As as commander. Muslim chroniclers also recorded the participation of Usama ibn Zayd whose father, Zayd ibn Haritha died earlier in the Battle of Mu'tah. Aside from many war veterans, a number of new Muslim converts joined the contingent.

== Expedition ==
Amr ibn al-As encamped at a spring called Salasil after marching for ten days, where he found the Banu Quda'a had assembled in large numbers. He sent a letter to Muhammad asking for reinforcements to bolster the army. Muhammad sent an additional two hundred soldiers which included Abu Bakr and Umar, headed by Abu Ubaidah ibn al Jarrah.

Abu Ubaidah and Amr ibn al-As disagreed to who should lead this contingent. Amr ibn al-As despite being a new convert, refused to step down and Abu Ubaidah relented for the sake of unity .

The Muslims began sending scouts. Amr ibn al-As upon realizing his opponent heavily outnumbered his own army, decided not to launch an attack during daylight and instructed his soldiers to encamp until night.

== Battle ==
The Muslims launched a night raid under the cover of darkness. Amr ibn al-As instructed his soldiers that for every two men fighting to stay close together, even as far as tying their horses together so as to not separate. During the battle, Usama bin Zayd recalled a well-known account of one of his engagements.

The Messenger of Allah may peace be upon him) sent us to Huraqat, a tribe of Juhaina. We attacked that tribe early in the morning and defeated them and I and a man from the Ansar caught hold of a person (of the defeated tribe). When we overcame him, he said: There is no god but Allah. At that moment the Ansari spared him, but I attacked him with my spear and killed him. The news had already reached the Apostle (peace be upon him), so when we came back he (the Apostle) said to me: Usama, did you kill him after he had made the profession: There is no god but Allah? I said. Messenger of Allah, he did it only as a shelter. The Prophet observed: Did you kill him after he had made the profession that there is no god but Allah? He (the Holy Prophet) went on repeating this to me till I wished I had not embraced Islam before that day.Sahih Muslim, 1:184

The night raid was successful as it caused mass desertions from the enemy with very minimal losses.

== Aftermath ==
Amr ibn al-As would later explain the reasoning behind his course of action. The soldiers were told to stay together to give an illusion of superior numbers and for them to maintain cohesion fighting in the dark. Umar concurred. The incident regarding Usama was also told to Muhammad in which Usama became deeply lamented after he is admonished regarding his conduct towards a surrendered combatant who has professed conversion to Islam.

The battle discouraged any further intentions by Ghassanid and Byzantine-affiliated tribes to attack the Muslims.

== Islamic Primary sources ==
The Expedition is referenced in the Sunni hadith collection Sahih al-Bukhari as follows:

Allah's Apostle sent 'Amr bin Al As as the commander of the troops of Dhat-us-Salasil. 'Amr bin Al-'As said, "(On my return) I came to the Prophet and said, 'Which people do you love most?' He replied, 'Aisha.' I said, 'From amongst the men?' He replied, 'Her father (Abu Bakr)'. I said, 'Whom (do you love) next?' He replied, "Umar.' Then he counted the names of many men, and I became silent for fear that he might regard me as the last of them."Sahih al-Bukhari, 5:59:644

== See also ==
- Military career of Muhammad
- List of expeditions of Muhammad
