= Siege of Bilbeis (640) =

639–640 siege

- Part of the Arab conquest of Egypt (Arab–Byzantine wars)
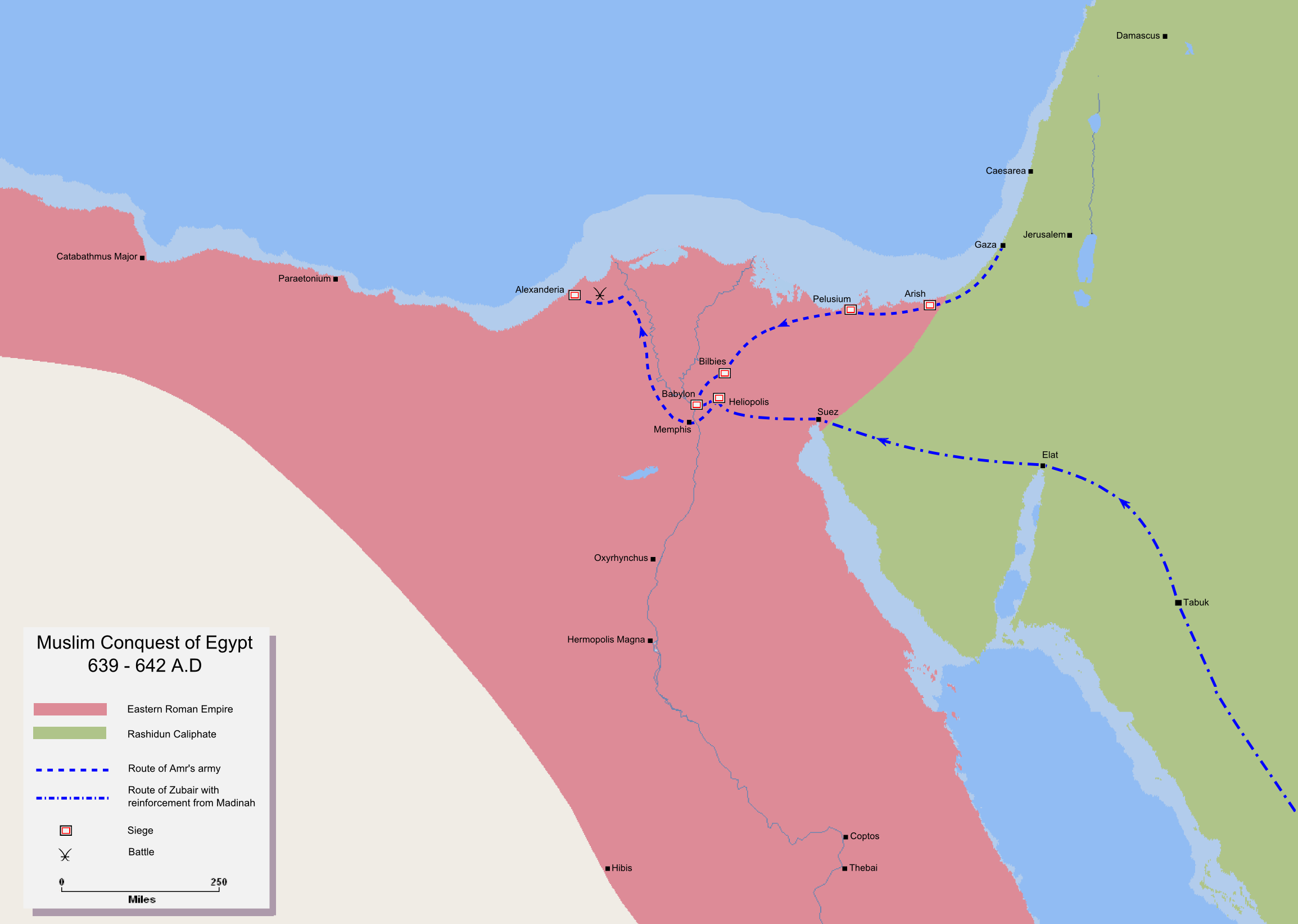
- The route during Muslim conquest of Egypt
Date	February – March 640
Location	Bilbeis, Egypt
Result	Rashidun victory

Belligerents
Rashidun Caliphate	Byzantine Empire

Commanders and leaders
Amr ibn al-As	Aretion †

Strength
4,000 men	Unknown

Casualties and losses
Heavy	1,000 killed 3,000 captured

The Siege of Bilbeis was a military engagement between the Rashidun army under Amr ibn al-As and the Byzantine garrison of Bilbeis. After a siege of one month, the Muslims captured the city.

== Prelude ==
After the conquest of Pelusium in February 640, the Muslim army numbering 4,000 under Amr ibn al-As advanced towards the city of Bilbeis. During their march, the Muslims encountered Byzantine rearguards opposing them, but their resistance was weak, and the Muslims were able to repel them easily with few losses. The Muslims marched from Pelusium through the desert roads to Bilbeis, which was 40 miles from Memphis.

== Siege ==
The fort of Bilbeis was well-fortified and showed strong resistance to the Muslims. The Byzantine garrison was led by Aretion. He and two other monks came out to the Muslims to negotiate. Aretion was a previous Byzantine governor of Jerusalem who fled after the Muslims captured the city. The Muslims offered them three choices: convert to Islam, pay the Jizya, or prepare to fight. Aretion asked the Muslim commander for three days to respond but later requested an additional two days. The Byzantine commander chose to resist the Muslims.

After two days of negotiations, the Byzantines launched a sortie at night against the Muslims who caught them unprepared and began a fierce onslaught. The Muslims, however, rallied and repelled the Byzantines, inflicting heavy losses. Aretion was killed during the battle. Still, the fort remained resistant to the Muslims, which led them to starve the city into submission. Many encounters took place as well. Finally, in March of 640, the Byzantines surrendered to the Muslims, who granted them generous terms. The Byzantines lost 1,000 dead and 3,000 prisoners during the conflict while Muslims suffered considerable losses.

== Aftermath ==
The Muslims once again requested from the Rashidun Caliph Umar for more reinforcements. In August of the same year, they received 4,000 men, making their force around 8,000 men. The Muslims continued their march, captured Umm Dunain, and defeated the Byzantines at the Battle of Heliopolis.

== Sources ==
- Robert Morgan (2016), History of the Coptic Orthodox People and the Church of Egypt.
- Alfred J. Butler (1902), The Arab conquest of Egypt and the last thirty years of the Roman dominion.
- Akram, A. I. (1977), The Muslim Conquest of Egypt and North Africa.
