= Banu Sahm =

Sub-tribe of the Quraysh tribe

Banu Sahm (Arabic: بنو سهم)
- Quraysh of the Banu Ismail
- Nisba: Al-Sahmi
- Location: Arabia
- Descended from: Adnan
- Religion: Islam

The Banu Sahm (Arabic: بنو سهم) is a clan of the Quraish tribe. They are related to the Banu Jumah, as they both were part of a larger clan descended from the same ancestor, the Banu Husays.

== Background and history ==
Banu Sahm was a clan of the Quraysh Arab tribe. The Quraysh's progenitor was Fihr ibn Malik, whose full genealogy, according to traditional Arab sources, was the following: Fihr ibn Malik ibn al-Nadr ibn Kinana ibn Khuzayma ibn Mudrika ibn Ilyas ibn Mudar ibn Nizar ibn Ma'add ibn Adnan. Thus, Fihr belonged to the Kinana tribe and his descent is traced to Adnan the Ishmaelite, the semi-legendary father of the "northern Arabs". According to the traditional sources, Fihr led the warriors of Kinana and Khuzayma in defense of the Kaaba, at the time a major pagan sanctuary in Mecca, against tribes from Yemen; however, the sanctuary and the privileges associated with it continued to be in the hands of the Yemeni Khuza'a tribe. The Quraysh gained their name when Qusayy ibn Kilab, a sixth-generation descendant of Fihr ibn Malik, gathered his kinsmen and took control of the Kaaba. Prior to this, Fihr's offspring lived in scattered, nomadic groups among their Kinana relatives.

The earliest members of Banu Sahm who accepted Islam was Khunays ibn Hudhafa. He accepted Islam under the influence of Abu Bakr at an early date "before Allah's Messenger entered the house of Al-Arqam". He had two brothers, Abd Allah and Qays, both accepted Islam. Several years later, Amr ibn al-As also accepted Islam. There are conflicting reports about when Amr embraced Islam, with the most credible version placing it in 629/630, not long before the conquest of Mecca by Muhammad. According to this account, he converted alongside the Qurayshites Khalid ibn al-Walid and Uthman ibn Talha. According to Amr's own testimony, transmitted by his fourth-generation descendant Amr ibn Shu'ayb, he converted in Axum in the presence of King Armah (Najashi) and met Muhammad in Medina upon the latter's return from the Battle of Khaybar in 628. Amr conditioned his conversion on the forgiveness of his past sins and an "active part in affairs", according to a report cited by the historian Ibn Asakir (d. 1176). Indeed, in October 629, Amr was tasked by Muhammad with leading the raid on Dhat al-Salasil, likely located in the northern Hejaz (western Arabia), a lucrative opportunity for Amr in view of the potential war spoils. The purpose of the raid is unclear, though the modern historian Fred Donner speculates that it was to "break up a gathering of hostile tribal groups" possibly backed by the Byzantine Empire. The historian Ibn Hisham (d. 833) holds that Amr rallied the nomadic Arabs in the region "to make war on [Byzantine] Syria". The tribal groups targeted in the raid included the Quda'a in general and the Bali specifically. Amr's paternal grandmother hailed from the Bali, and this may have motivated his appointment to the command by Muhammad as Amr was instructed to recruit tribesmen from the Bali and the other Quda'a tribes of Balqayn and Banu Udhra. Following the raid, a delegation of the Bali embraced Islam. Amr further consecrated ties with the tribe by marrying a Bali woman, with whom he had his son Muhammad.

Muhammad appointed Amr (member of Banu Sahm) as the governor of Oman and he remained there until being informed of Muhammad's death in 632. Amr was personally chosen by Muhammad to deliver a letter calling the kings of Oman, the Julanda brothers Abd and Jayfa, to convert to Islam while being accompanied by Sa'id ibn Aws al-Ansari. Historian Al-Baladhuri reports that on their departure to Sohar, Muhammad said to them: "If these people (of Oman) accept the witness of truth and pledge obedience to Allah and his Prophet, Amr will be the commander, and Abu Zayd will officiate in prayer. Propagate Islam and teach the Qur'an and the institutions of the Prophet."

The death of Muhammad prompted several Arab tribes to defect from the nascent Medina-based Muslim polity in the Ridda wars. Muhammad's successor Caliph Abu Bakr (r. 632–634) appointed Amr to rein in the apostate Quda'a tribes, and among those targeted were the Hejazi branches of the Bali. Amr's campaigns, which were supported by the commander Shurahbil ibn Hasana, succeeded in restoring Medina's authority as far as the northern frontier with Syria. Members of Banu Sahm clan played huge role in Conquest of Egypt and Syria. They also played role in Islamic traditions.

== Notable members ==
- Khunais ibn Hudhaifa
- 'Amr ibn al-'As
- Hisham ibn al-A'as
- 'Abd Allah ibn 'Amr ibn al-'As
- Muhammad ibn Amr ibn al-As
- Abd Allah ibn Hudhafa
- Qays ibn Hudhafa
- Hudhafa ibn Qays, father of Abdallah ibn Hudhafa.
- Amr ibn Shu'ayb, fourth-generation descendant of Amr ibn al-As and a famous scholar.

== See also ==
- Islam
- At-Takathur, verse 1-2

== Sources ==
- Watt, W. Montgomery (1986). "Kuraysh". Encyclopedia of Islam. Vol. V: Khe–Mahi (New ed.). Leiden and New York: Brill. pp. 434–435. ISBN 90-04-07819-3.
- Lecker, Michael (1989). "The Estates of 'Amr b. al-'Āṣ in Palestine: Notes on a New Negev Arabic Inscription". Bulletin of the School of Oriental and African Studies, University of London. 52 (1): 24–37. doi:10.1017/S0041977X00023041. JSTOR 617911. S2CID 163092638.
- al-Rawas, Isam Ali Ahmed (1990). Early Islamic Oman (ca - 622/280-893): A Political History (Doctoral thesis). Durham University.
- Wensinck, A. J. (1960). "ʿAmr b. al-ʿĀṣ al-Sahmī". In Gibb, H. A. R.; Kramers, J. H.; Lévi-Provençal, E.; Schacht, J.; Lewis, B. & Pellat, Ch. (eds.). The Encyclopaedia of Islam, Second Edition. Volume I: A–B. Leiden: E. J. Brill. p. 451. OCLC 495469456.
- Donner, Fred M. (1981). The Early Islamic Conquests. Princeton: Princeton University Press. ISBN 0-691-05327-8.
