= Battle of Sebennytos (641) =

Byzantine victory in Egypt over the Rashiduns

- Part of the Muslim conquest of Egypt
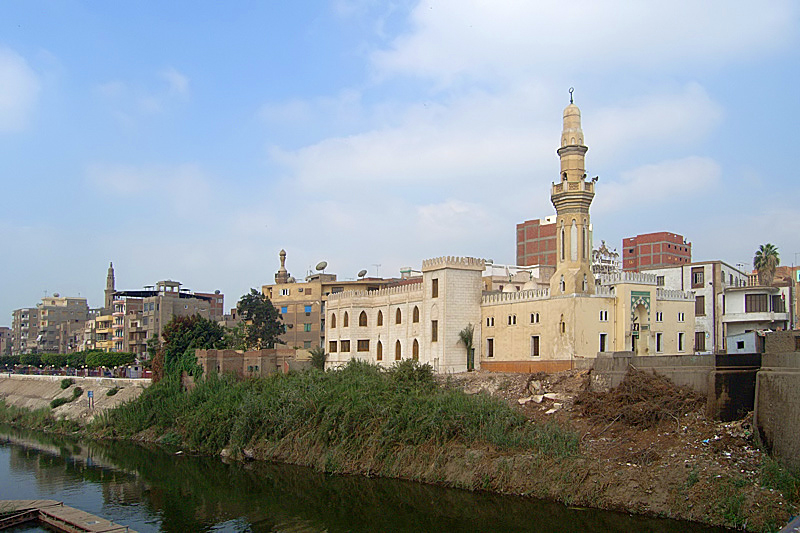
- Nile bank in Samannud
Date	Late 640 or early 641
Location	Sebennytos, Egypt
Result	Byzantine victory

Belligerents
Byzantine Empire	Rashidun Caliphate

Commanders and leaders
Theodore	Amr ibn al-As; Zubayr ibn al-Awwam

Strength
Unknown; possibly fewer	Less than 16,000 (Note: On 6 June 640, Amr ibn al-As received Arab reinforcements at Heliopolis under Zubayr ibn al-Awwam, which brought the total strength of his army in Egypt up to 14,000-16,000. However, as some of this force was detached under a second column in winter 640, while a separate contingent maintained the siege of Babylon, it is unknown how many men Amr personally commanded at Sebennytos)

Casualties and losses
Unknown	Heavy

The Battle of Sebennytos was a military engagement between the forces of the Byzantine Empire and the Rashidun Caliphate fought near the town of Sebennytos. The Rashidun forces under Amr ibn al-As were repelled during an unexpected counter-attack, marking a temporary setback of the broader Arab conquest of Egypt.

== Background ==
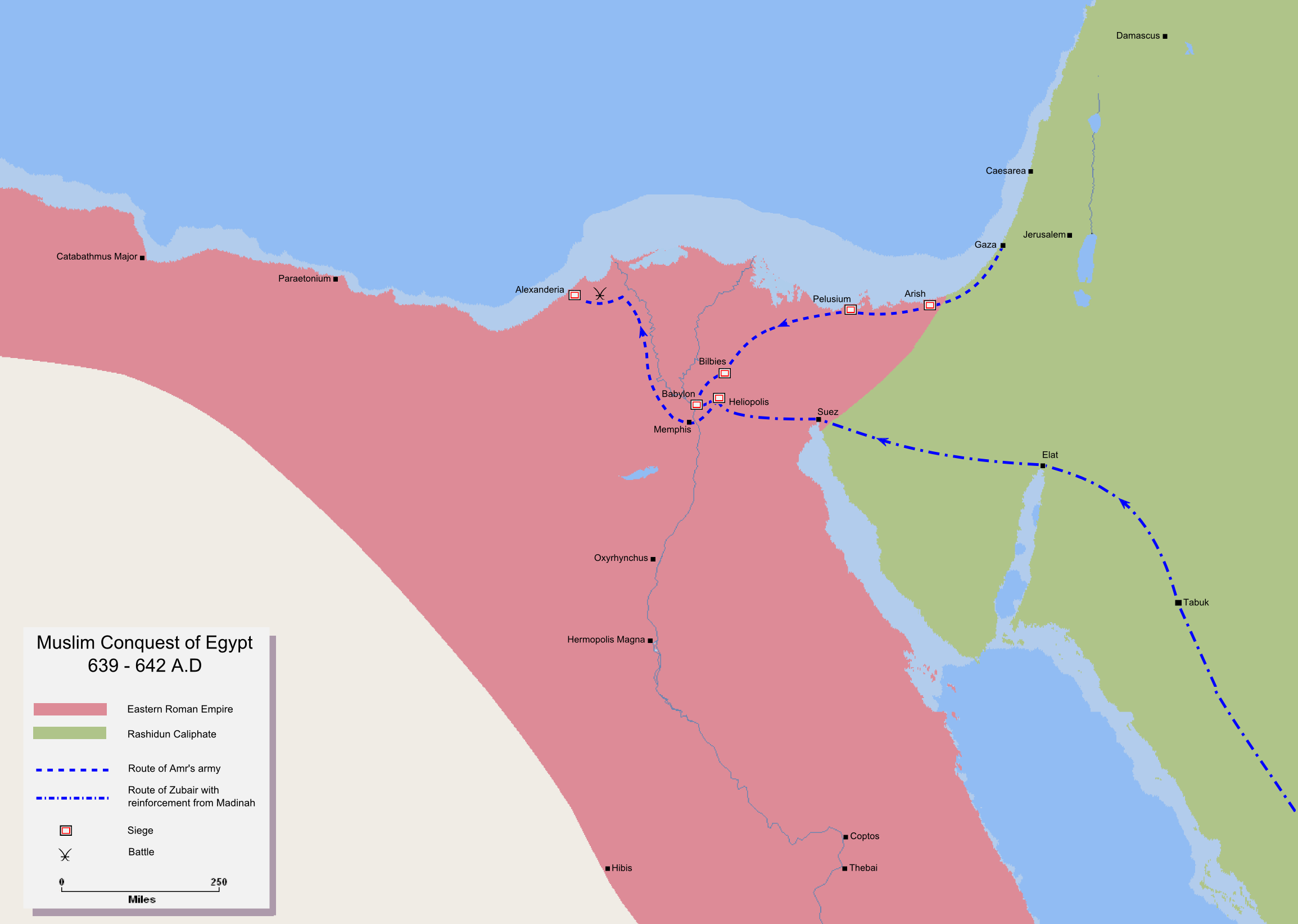
Map depiction of the Muslim conquest of Egypt

Following the crucial events after the battle of Heliopolis in 640, and the subsequent siege and capture of the fortress of Babylon by Rashidun forces, the Prefect of Egypt, Theodore, evacuated his remaining forces overnight to the neighboring island of Rauda, following a brief five-day ceasefire for Easter. The survivors of the onslaught at Babylon fortress soon abandoned the site on Easter Monday and began a demoralized retreat northward through the Nile Delta, towards Nikiû and Alexandria. After invseting the fortress of Babylon and the remaining troops within it, Amr immediately set about securing the surroundings of Egypt. Initially a Rashidun attack on the fortress of Misr failed, but soon thereafter the strength of Amr's forces was further bolstered by Egyptian turncoats, who provided him ships to transport his men across the Nile. These also assisted him in constructing two bridges across the river. One bridge was built north of Babylon fortress to prevent Byzantine ships from reinforcing the fortress, while the other was raised at the eastern branch of the Nile, at Qalyub. Amr marched across the latter bridge and captured the towns of Menouf and Athrib. Amr sought to press his advantage further by dividing his army into two columns, sending the second force southwards to suppress isolated Byzantine resistance and secure agricultural supply lines, while leading the main contingent north to pursue Theodore’s column along the waterways before the Byzantines could reorganize, advancing from Athrib towards Sebennytos.

== Battle ==
By this time, the Emperor Heraclius had dispatched reinforcements to Egypt under Marianos the Eunuch, which partially offset the losses sustained by Theodore during the disaster at Heliopolis. To slow the Arab advance down, Theodore dispatched two local garrison commanders to establish a brief rearguard line near the town of Sebennytos, using both regular Byzantine troops and Egyptian militiamen. However, upon witnessing the speed and ferocity of the approaching Muslim scouting parties, the militia raised from the native men of the area refused to cooperate with the Byzantine high command to oppose the Rashidun army. Nevertheless, the professional Byzantine troops in the area were in sufficiently high spirits to oppose the Muslims without the support of the locals. At this time, the terrain surrounding Sebennytos had been flooded by overflowing waterways, thus producing marshland, which negated the Rashidun advantages in tactical manoeuvrability. In particular, the presence of moats and canals in the area nullified the advantages usually held by the swift-moving Rashidun mounted troops. Leveraging the terrain as a force multiplier, the Byzantine troops were able to frustrate the efforts of the Amr's army to dislodge them, thus handing a rare but limited defeat to the Rashiduns. Unable to break through the Byzantine lines to take Sebennytos, Amr was forced to retreat, having sustained significant losses in the fighting.

Following the defeat, Amr withdrew to the town of Busir. As he feared the prospect of Theodore exploiting the Byzantine victory to launch an offensive against the Muslim forces, Amr took the precaution of fortifying this location. The nearby forts of Menouf and Athrib were also repaired and garrisoned. However, Theodore did not attempt to follow up the success gained by his men, allowing Amr to return to Babylon fortress and intensify his siege of the fortress, eventually facilitating its capture by the Arabs. (Note: Tensions between the Chalcedonian Byzantine professional troops and the local Coptic Egyptians may have been the reason for Theodore's inaction. These conflicts had already resulted in the Byzantine regulars fighting the Muslims without the support of local militiamen at Sebennytos. The religious policies of Patriarch Cyrus of Alexandria had sown further dissent in the province of Egypt, contributing to Byzantine difficulties in defending the region at the time)

== Bibliography ==
- Syvänne, Ilkka (2022). The Military History of Late Rome AD 602–641. Pen and Sword. ISBN 978-1-39907-567-1.
- Butler, Alfred (1903). The Arab Conquest of Egypt and the Last Thirty Years of the Roman Dominion (PDF). Oxford: (PDF). Oxford University Press. ISBN 1724498029.
- Kennedy, Hugh (2007). The Great Arab Conquests: How the Spread of Islam Changed the World We Live in. Da Capo Press. ISBN 978 0 2978 6559 9.
