= Abd Allah ibn Amr ibn al-As =

Companion of the Islamic prophet Muhammad (died 684)

Governor of Egypt
- In office January 664 – February 664
- Monarch: Mu'awiya I (r. 661–680)
- Preceded by: Amr ibn al-As
- Succeeded by: Utba ibn Abi Sufyan

Personal details
- Died: 684
- Relations: Banu Sahm (clan)
- Parent: Amr ibn al-As (father)

Abū Muḥammad 'Abd Allah ibn Amr ibn al-As (Arabic: أَبُو مُحَمَّدِ عَبۡدُ ٱللهِ بْنُ عَمْرِو بۡنِ ٱلۡعَاصِ ٱلسَّهْمِيُّ ٱلۡقُرَشِيُّ, romanized: Abū Muḥammad ʿAbd Allāh ibn ʿAmr ibn al-ʿĀṣ as-Sahmī al-Qurašī; died 684 CE) was the son of Amr ibn al-As and a companion of the Islamic prophet Muhammad. He was the author of "Sahifah al-Sadiqah" ("The Truthful Script", Arabic: الصحيفة الصادقة), the first known hadith compilation document. The document contained about one thousand of prophet Muhammad's narrations.

== Biography ==
Abd Allah ibn Amr embraced Islam in the year 7 AH (c. 628 CE), a year before his father, Amr ibn al-As. Muhammad was said to have shown a preference for Abd Allah ibn 'Amr due to his knowledge. He was one of the first companions to write down the Hadith, after receiving permission from Muhammad to do so.

Abd Allah witnessed some of the battles under Muhammad. He participated in the Battle of Siffin as he was obliged to follow his father in the ranks of Mu'awiya. He led the right wing of the army, though he did not take part in the actual fighting. He was said to have regretted his participation.

Abd Allah succeeded his father Amr as governor of Egypt for a few weeks in early 664 before Mu'awiya, who had become caliph in 661, appointed his own brother Utba ibn Abi Sufyan to the post.

== Character ==
Known as one of "four Abadillah" Faqīh, a group of companions known for their Sharia expertise who shared the same name, the other three were Abdullah ibn Umar, Abdullah ibn Zubayr, and Abdullah Ibn Abbas.

Abu Huraira, considered one of the most prolific hadith narrator, said that Abd Allah ibn 'Amr was more knowledgeable than he was.

His work Al-Sahifah al-Sadiqah remained in his family and was used by his grandson 'Amr ibn Shu'ayb. Ahmad ibn Hanbal incorporated the whole of the work of Abd Allah ibn 'Amr in his voluminous book Musnad Ahmad ibn Hanbal, thereby covering the missing Al-Sahifah al-Sadiqah which was written in the days of Muhammad.

== Sources ==
- Foss, Clive (2009). "Egypt under Muʿāwiya Part I: Flavius Papas and Upper Egypt". Bulletin of the School of Oriental and African Studies. 72 (1): 1–24. doi:10.1017/S0041977X09000019. JSTOR 40378842.

Preceded by Amr ibn al-As	Governor of Egypt (Acting governor); January 664 – February 664	Succeeded by Utba ibn Abi Sufyan
