= Abd Allah ibn Hudhafa =

Courier of Muhammad (died 653)

Abd Allah ibn Hudhafa عبد الله بن حذافة
- Died: c. 653; Egypt, Rashidun Caliphate
- Known for: Companion of the Islamic prophet Muhammad
- Parents: Hudhafa ibn Qays (father); Da'ida bint Hidhyam (mother)
- Relatives: Khunays (brother); Qays (brother)
- Family: Banu Sahm (from Quraysh)

Abd Allah ibn Hudhafa al-Sahmi (Arabic: عبد الله بن حذافة السهمي, romanized: ʿAbd Allāh ibn Ḥudhāfa al-Sahmī; died 653) was a companion of the Islamic prophet Muhammad. He is best known in Islamic tradition for his role as the courier of a letter from Muhammad to Khosrow II, the King of Persia, and for his imprisonment and torture by Heraclius, the Byzantine Emperor.

== In Prophet Muhammad's era ==
=== Letter to Khosrow II ===
Abd Allah bin Hudhafa al-Sahmi carried the letter of Muhammad to Khosrow II, the emperor of the Sassanid Empire (Persia). When Abd Allah entered the kingdom, Khosrow sent his messenger to get the letter off him but Abd Allah refused, saying Muhammad had ordered him to present the letter to the King only and he was not going to break the instructions of Muhammad. Khosrow was enraged by the letter, tearing it into shreds. When Muhammad heard Khosrow had torn his letter, he made a prayer that Allah tears his kingdom. Khosrow sent a couple of troopers to arrest Muhammad and bring him to his presence. As soon as the men reached Madina, Muhammad was informed by Divine Revelation that Khosrow, the emperor of Persia, had been murdered by his own son, which Muhammad disclosed to the troopers.

=== The leader of an expedition ===
Muslim scholars says that, and according to hadith of Sihah Sittah and Tafsir Ibn Kathir, the verse of Obedience about uli al-Amr was revealed about an incident of sahaba Abd Allah ibn Hudhafa. Muhammad once sent him as a military leader of some sahabas, on the way he became furious and told them to make coils of fire, and to plunge into it. However, Imam Asakir Zuhri said, Abdullah was a humorous person. He made this order in jest. After returning from the expedition, the Islamic prophet Muhammad said, obedience to the leader is only wajib in those matters which Allah has permitted.

== In Caliph Umar's era ==
In 639 (19AH), during the Caliphate of Umar, he sent an army to Rome. There, Heraclius, the emperor of the Byzantine Empire, attempted to convert Abd Allah to Christianity with bribery and torture, but Abd Allah refused to recant. Heraclius attempted all sorts of torture, such as boiling other sahaba in front of him. He attempted to send a prostitute to Abd Allah's cell, but his firm belief in Islam led him to run around in his cell to get away from the woman. She eventually grew bored and gave up. Heraclius then attempted to scare him, by ordering his soldiers to shoot arrows at him, but not hit him. Again, this didn't faze Abd Allah ibn Hudhafa. When Heraclius boiled the other sahaba in front of Abd Allah, Abd Allah began to cry. Heraclius thought he had finally broken him and mocked him. Abd Allah, then declared that he wasn't crying out of fear, rather he was crying that he knew he could only die once, and proclaimed that he wishes he was blessed with 1000 lives in order to die in the same way, due to the strength of his faith in Islam. After all this, Heraclius tried on the last attempt. He told Abd Allah, "If you kiss my head, I will let you go." Abd Allah refused and said, "I wouldn't let you kiss my head". Heraclius then said, "Kiss my forehead and I will let go of 60 sahaba and you." Abd Allah refused. This kept on going until Heraclius said: "Kiss my forehead and I will let go of 300 sahaba". Abd Allah agreed.

Abd Allah and the Sahaba were freed and made their way back to the Muslim lands. When talk of Abd Allah's bravery spread throughout the land, the Islamic Caliph Umar ibn al-Khattab, order all the Muslims to kiss the forehead of Abd Allah ibn Hudhafa al-Sahmi, and kissed him on his forehead first.

== Death ==
He died in Egypt in 653 (33AH) during the caliphate of Uthman.
