= Khunays ibn Hudhafa =

Companion of Muhammad

Khunays ibn Hudhafa خنيس بن حذافة
- Born: Khunays ibn Ḥudhāfa; Hejaz, Arabia
- Died: c. 624 (2 AH); Medina, Hejaz
- Resting place: al-Baqi', Medina
- Known for: Companion of Muhammad
- Spouse: Hafsa bint Umar (m. 614/615)
- Parents: Hudhafa ibn Qays (father); Da'ifa bint Hidhyam (mother)
- Relatives: Abd Allah (brother); Qays (brother)
- Family: Banu Sahm (from Quraysh)

Khunays ibn Ḥudhāfa (Arabic: خنيس بن حذافة) (d. 2 AH/624) was a companion of Muhammad. He died at the beginning of twenty-five months after Muhammad went to Medina.

== Biography ==
Khunays was the son of Hudhafa ibn Qays from the Sahm clan of the Quraysh tribe in Mecca. His mother, Da'ifa bint Hidhyam, was also from the Sahm clan. He had two brothers, Abd Allah and Qays.

He was converted to Islam under the influence of Abu Bakr at an early date "before Allah's Messenger entered the house of Al-Arqam".

He joined the emigration to Abyssinia in 616, along with his two brothers, seven cousins and four other members of the clan. Khunays was among those who returned to Mecca in 619 "under the protection of a citizen or by stealth." Soon afterwards he married Hafsa bint Umar, who would then may have been about fourteen years old.

When Umar emigrated to Medina in 622, Khunays and Hafsa accompanied his party. At first they lodged with Rifa'a ibn Abd al-Mundhir. When Muhammad instructed each Muslim to take a brother in Islam, he paired Khunays with Abu Abs ibn Jabr, a brother-in-law of Muhammad ibn Maslama.

Khunays was the only member of the Sahm clan who fought at the Battle of Badr in March 624.

He died in late August 624. He was buried at Al-Baqi', where Muhammad officiated at his funeral.

He had no descendants. His widow, Hafsa was later married to Muhammad.

== See also ==
- List of expeditions of Muhammad
- List of Sahabah
- Sunni view of the Sahaba
- Umar
