= Amr ibn al-As =

Arab military commander and governor (c. 573–664)

Amr ibn al-As عَمْرِو بْنِ الْعَاصِ
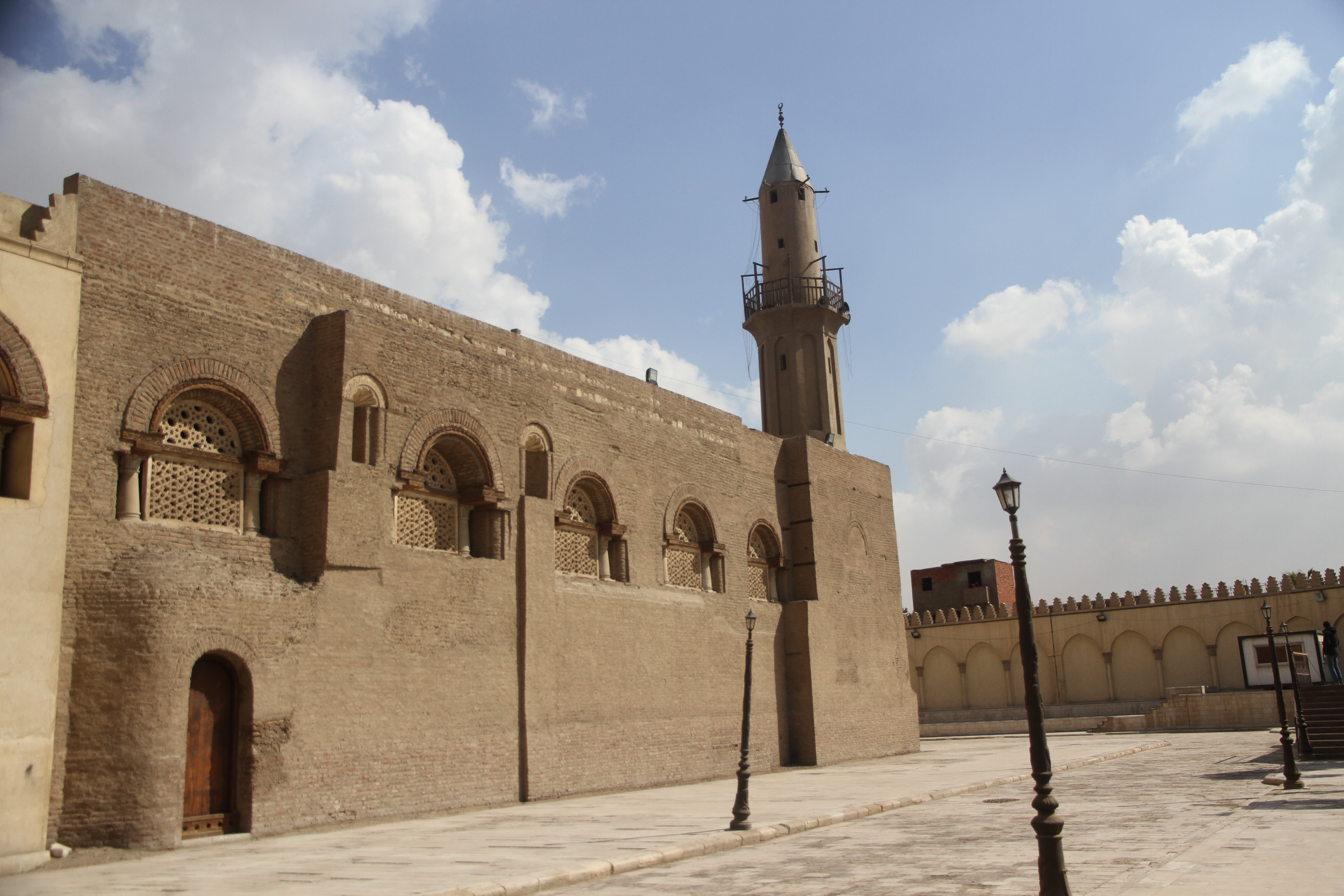
- The Amr ibn al-As Mosque in Fustat (Old Cairo), Egypt

Governor of Egypt
- In office 640–646
- Monarchs: Umar; Uthman
- Preceded by: Office established
- Succeeded by: Abd Allah ibn Sa'd
- In office August/September 658 – 664
- Monarch: Mu'awiya I
- Preceded by: Muhammad ibn Abi Bakr; Malik al-Ashtar (Note: According to one account reported by the 9th-century historian al-Tabari, Malik al-Ashtar was appointed governor of Egypt before Amr ibn al-As' predecessor Muhammad ibn Abi Bakr. Other accounts reported by al-Tabari and the 9th-century historian al-Mas'udi hold that Malik was appointed after Ibn Abi Bakr was dismissed. All accounts agree that Malik died before he could assume office, and that Ibn Abi Bakr was in charge until his defeat by Amr.)
- Succeeded by: Abd Allah ibn Amr; Utba ibn Abi Sufyan (Note: Amr's son Abd Allah succeeded him as governor of Egypt for a few weeks before Caliph Mu'awiya I appointed his own brother Utba ibn Abi Sufyan to the post.)

Governor of Palestine
- In office 634–639
- Monarchs: Abu Bakr; Umar
- Preceded by: Office established
- Succeeded by: Alqama ibn Mujazziz

Governor of Oman
- In office 630–632
- Monarch: Muhammad
- Preceded by: Office established
- Succeeded by: Office abolished

Personal details
- Born: c. 573 Mecca, Hejaz
- Died: c. 664 (aged 90–91) Egypt, Umayyad Caliphate
- Spouse(s): Rayta or Hind bint Munabbih ibn al-Hajjaj; Unnamed woman from Bali tribe Umm Kulthum bint Uqba
- Relations: Banu Sahm (clan)
- Children: Abd Allah; Muhammad
- Parent(s): Al-As ibn Wa'il; Al-Nabigha bint Harmala

Military service
- Allegiance: Muhammad (629–632); Rashidun Caliphate (632–657); Mu'awiya (657–661); Umayyad Caliphate (661–664)
- Years of service: 629–646; 657–658
- Battles/wars: Campaigns of Muhammad; Raid of Amr ibn al-As; Raid of Dhat al-Salasil; Muslim conquest of Syria; Battle of Dathin; Battle of Ajnadayn; Battle of Fahl; Siege of Damascus; Battle of the Yarmuk; Siege of Jerusalem; Siege of Caesarea Maritima; Muslim conquest of Egypt; Siege of Pelusium; Siege of Bilbeis; Battle of Heliopolis; Battle of Sebennytos; Siege of Babylon Fortress; Siege of Alexandria; First battle of Dongola; Battle of Nikiou; First Fitna; Battle of Siffin; Umayyad invasions of Egypt (657–658)

Amr ibn al-As ibn Wa'il al-Sahmi (Note: Arabic: عَمْرِو بْنِ الْعَاصِ بْنِ وَائِل السَّهْمِي, romanized: ʿAmr ibn al-ʿĀṣ ibn Wāʾil al-Sahmī) (c. 585 – 664) was an Arab commander and companion of Muhammad who led the Muslim conquest of Egypt and served as its governor in 640–646 and 658–664. The son of a wealthy Qurayshite, Amr embraced Islam in c. 629 and was assigned important roles in the nascent Muslim community by the Islamic prophet Muhammad. The first caliph Abu Bakr (r. 632–634) appointed Amr as a commander of what became the conquest of Syria. He conquered most of Palestine, to which he was appointed governor, and helped lead the Arabs to decisive victories over the Byzantines at the battles of Ajnadayn and the Yarmuk in 634 and 636.

Amr launched the expedition that conquered Egypt on his own initiative in late 639, defeating the Byzantines in a string of victories ending with the surrender of Alexandria in 641 or 642. It was the swiftest of the early Muslim conquests. This was followed by westward advances by Amr as far as Tripoli in present-day Libya. In a treaty signed with the Byzantine governor Cyrus, Amr guaranteed the security of Egypt's population and imposed a poll tax on non-Muslim adult men. He maintained the Coptic-dominated bureaucracy and cordial ties with the Coptic patriarch Benjamin. He founded Fustat as the provincial capital with the mosque later called after him at its center. Amr ruled relatively independently, acquired significant wealth, and upheld the interests of the Arab conquerors who formed Fustat's garrison in relation to the central authorities in Medina. After gradually diluting Amr's authority, Caliph Uthman (r. 644–656) dismissed him in 646 after accusations of incompetence from his successor Abd Allah ibn Sa'd.

After mutineers from Egypt assassinated Uthman, Amr distanced himself from their cause, despite previously instigating opposition against Uthman. In the ensuing First Fitna, Amr joined Mu'awiya ibn Abi Sufyan against Caliph Ali (r. 656–661) due to promises of the governorship of Egypt and its tax revenues. Amr served as Mu'awiya's representative in the abortive arbitration talks to end the war. Afterward, he wrested control of Egypt from Ali's loyalists, killing its governor Muhammad ibn Abi Bakr, and assumed the governorship instead. Mu'awiya kept him in his post after establishing the Umayyad Caliphate in 661 and Amr ruled the province until his death.

== Early life and military career ==
Amr ibn al-As was born in c. 573. His father, al-As ibn Wa'il, was a wealthy landowner from the Banu Sahm clan of the Quraysh tribe of Mecca. Following the death of al-As in c. 622, Amr inherited from him the lucrative al-Waht estate and vineyards near Ta'if. Amr's mother was al-Nabigha bint Harmala from the Banu Jallan clan of the Anaza tribe. She had been taken captive and sold, in succession, to several members of the Quraysh, one of whom was Amr's father. As such, Amr had two maternal half-brothers, Amr ibn Atatha of the Banu Adi and Uqba ibn Nafi of the Banu Fihr, and a half-sister from the Banu Abd Shams. Amr is physically described in the traditional sources as being short with broad shoulders, having a large head with a wide forehead and wide mouth, long arms and a long beard.

There are conflicting reports about when Amr embraced Islam, with the most credible version placing it in 629/630, not long before the conquest of Mecca by Muhammad. According to this account, he converted alongside the Qurayshites Khalid ibn al-Walid and Uthman ibn Talha. According to Amr's own testimony, transmitted by his fourth-generation descendant Amr ibn Shu'ayb, he converted in Axum in the presence of King Armah (Najashi) and met Muhammad in Medina upon the latter's return from the Battle of Khaybar in 628. Amr conditioned his conversion on the forgiveness of his past sins and an "active part in affairs", according to a report cited by the historian Ibn Asakir (d. 1176).

Indeed, in October 629, Amr was tasked by Muhammad with leading the raid on Dhat al-Salasil, likely located in the northern Hejaz (western Arabia), a lucrative opportunity for Amr in view of the potential war spoils. The purpose of the raid is unclear, though the modern historian Fred Donner speculates that it was to "break up a gathering of hostile tribal groups" possibly backed by the Byzantine Empire. The historian Ibn Hisham (d. 833) holds that Amr rallied the nomadic Arabs in the region "to make war on [Byzantine] Syria". The tribal groups targeted in the raid included the Quda'a in general and the Bali specifically. Amr's paternal grandmother hailed from the Bali, and this may have motivated his appointment to the command by Muhammad as Amr was instructed to recruit tribesmen from the Bali and the other Quda'a tribes of Balqayn and Banu Udhra. Following the raid, a delegation of the Bali embraced Islam. Amr further consecrated ties with the tribe by marrying a Bali woman, with whom he had his son Muhammad.

Muhammad appointed Amr as the governor of Oman and he remained there until being informed of Muhammad's death in 632. Amr was personally chosen by Muhammad to deliver a letter calling the kings of Oman, the Julanda brothers Abd and Jayfa, to convert to Islam while being accompanied by Sa'id ibn Aws al-Ansari. Historian Al-Baladhuri reports that on their departure to Sohar, Muhammad said to them:

"If these people (of Oman) accept the witness of truth and pledge obedience to Allah and his Prophet, Amr will be the commander, and Abu Zayd will officiate in prayer. Propagate Islam and teach the Qur'an and the institutions of the Prophet."

The death of Muhammad prompted several Arab tribes to defect from the nascent Medina-based Muslim polity in the Ridda wars. Muhammad's successor Caliph Abu Bakr (r. 632–634) appointed Amr to rein in the apostate Quda'a tribes, and among those targeted were the Hejazi branches of the Bali. Amr's campaigns, which were supported by the commander Shurahbil ibn Hasana, succeeded in restoring Medina's authority as far as the northern frontier with Syria.

== Governor of Palestine and role in the Syrian conquest ==
Amr was one of four commanders dispatched by Abu Bakr to conquer Syria in 633. The focus of Amr's campaign was Palestine, to which he had been appointed governor by Abu Bakr before his departure. As a Qurayshite merchant Amr was likely already well-acquainted with the routes to Gaza, a principle terminal for Meccan caravans. He took the coastal route of the Hejaz, reaching Ayla, a Muslim possession since 630, before breaking west into the Negev desert or possibly the Sinai. He arrived near the villages of Dathin and Badan in Gaza's environs where he entered into talks with Gaza's Byzantine commander. After the negotiations broke down, Amr's men bested the Byzantines at the Battle of Dathin on 4 February 634 and set up headquarters at Ghamr al-Arabat in the middle of the Wadi Araba. Most accounts hold that Amr's army was 3,000-strong; the Muhajirun (emigrants from Mecca to Medina) and the Ansar (natives of Medina), who together formed the core of the earliest Muslim converts, dominated his forces according to al-Waqidi (d. 823), while the 9th-century historian Ibn A'tham holds that Amr's army consisted of 3,300 Qurayshite and allied horsemen, 1,700 horsemen from the Banu Sulaym and 200 from the Yemenite tribe of Madh'hij. The historian Philip Mayerson considers the troop figures to be "unquestionably exaggerated" but still representing the largest Arab fighting force to have ever been assembled in southern Palestine and the Sinai until then.

Amr conquered the area around Gaza by February or March 634 and proceeded to besiege Caesarea, the capital of Byzantine Palestine, in July. He soon after abandoned the siege upon the approach of a large Byzantine army. After being reinforced by the remainder of the Muslim armies in Syria, including the new arrivals commanded by Khalid ibn al-Walid, Amr, with overall command of the 20,000-strong Muslim forces, routed the Byzantine army at the Battle of Ajnadayn, the first major confrontation between the Muslims and Byzantium, in July–August 634. Amr occupied numerous towns in Palestine, including Bayt Jibrin, Yibna, Amwas, Lydda, Jaffa, Nablus and Sebastia. Most of these localities surrendered after little resistance due to the flight of Byzantine troops; consequently, there is scant information about them in the traditional accounts of the conquest. Abu Bakr's successor Umar (r. 634–644) appointed or confirmed Amr as the commander and governor of the military district of Palestine.

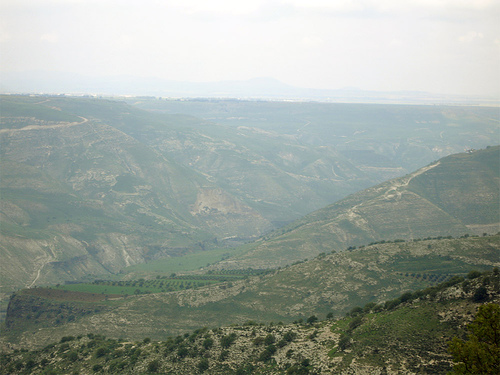
The ravines of the Yarmouk River where Amr kept the Byzantines confined at the decisive Battle of Yarmouk in 636

The Muslims pursued the Byzantine army northward and besieged them at Pella for four months. Amr may have retained overall command of the Muslim armies until this point, though other accounts assign command to Khalid or Abu Ubayda ibn al-Jarrah. In any case, the Muslims landed a heavy blow against the Byzantines in the ensuing Battle of Fahl in December 634 or January 635. Afterward, Amr and Shurahbil may have been sent to besiege Beisan, which capitulated after minor resistance. The Muslims proceeded to besiege Damascus, where the remnants of the Byzantine army from the battles of Ajnadayn and Fahl had gathered. Amr was positioned at the Bab Tuma gate, the Muslim commanders having each been assigned to block one of the city's entrances. By August–September 635, Damascus surrendered to the Muslims. Amr acquired several residences there.

In response to the series of defeats, the Byzantine emperor Heraclius (r. 610–641) led a large army in person to confront the Muslims; its rout at the Battle of Yarmouk, in which Amr played a key role by confining the Byzantines between the banks of the Yarmouk River and the Yarmouk's ravine, in August–September 636, paved the way for the rest of Syria's conquest by the Muslims. Following Yarmouk, the Muslims attempted to capture Jerusalem, where Amr had previously sent an advance force. Abu Ubayda led the siege of Jerusalem, in which Amr participated, but the city only surrendered after Caliph Umar arrived in person to conclude a treaty with its defenders. Amr was one of the witnesses of the Treaty of Umar. From Jerusalem, Amr then proceeded to besiege and capture the city of Gaza.

== First governorship of Egypt ==
=== Conquest of Egypt ===
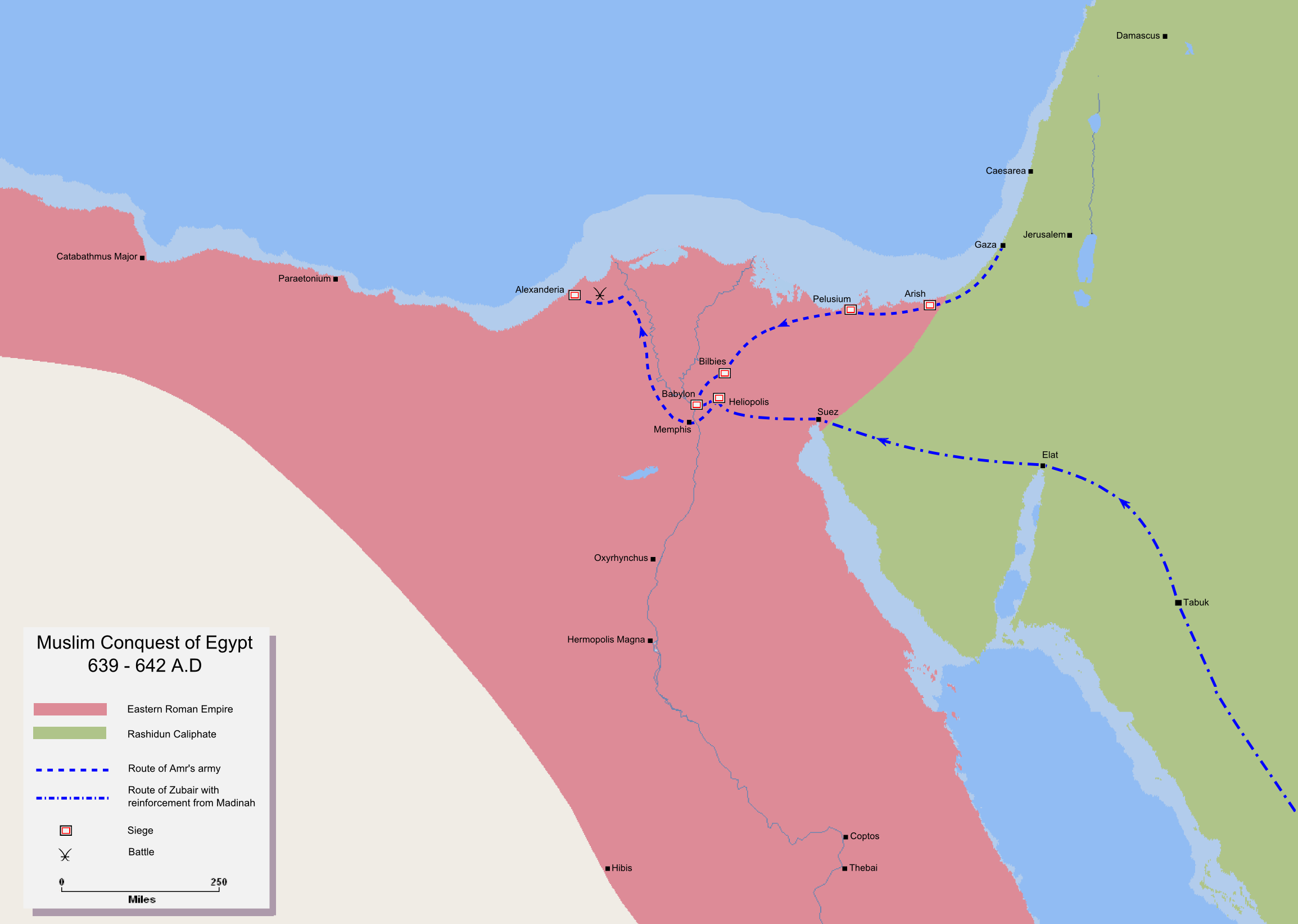
Map detailing the route of Amr and Zubayr ibn al-Awwam's conquest of Egypt

From his base in southern Palestine, Amr launched the conquest of Byzantine Egypt. He had established trading interests there before his conversion to Islam, making him aware of its importance in international trade. The traditional Muslim sources generally hold that Amr undertook the campaign with Caliph Umar's reluctant approval, though a number of accounts hold that he entered the region without Umar's authorization. At the head of 4,000 cavalries and with no siege engines, Amr arrived at the frontier town of al-Arish along the northern Sinai coastline on 12 December 639. He captured the strategic Mediterranean port city of Pelusium (al-Farama) following a month-long siege and moved against Bilbeis, which also fell after a month-long siege.

Amr halted his campaign before the fortified Byzantine stronghold of Babylon, at the head of the Nile Delta, and requested reinforcements from Umar. The latter dispatched Zubayr ibn al-Awwam, a leading Qurayshite companion of Muhammad, with a 4,000-strong force, which joined Amr's camp in June 640. Amr retained the supreme command of Arab forces in Egypt. In the following month, his army decisively defeated the Byzantines at the Battle of Heliopolis. He captured Memphis soon after and besieged Babylon. During the siege, Amr entered truce negotiations with the Alexandria-based Byzantine governor Cyrus; Emperor Heraclius opposed the talks and recalled Cyrus to Constantinople. Though strong resistance was put up by Babylon's defenders, their morale was sapped after news of Heraclius' death in February 641. Amr made an agreement with the Byzantine garrison, allowing their peaceful withdrawal toward the provincial capital Alexandria on 9 April 641. Amr then sent his lieutenants to conquer different parts of the country. One of them, Kharija ibn Hudhafa, captured the Fayyum oasis, Oxyrhynchus (Bahnasa), Hermopolis (el-Ashmunein) and Akhmim, all in Middle Egypt, and an unspecified number of villages in Upper Egypt.

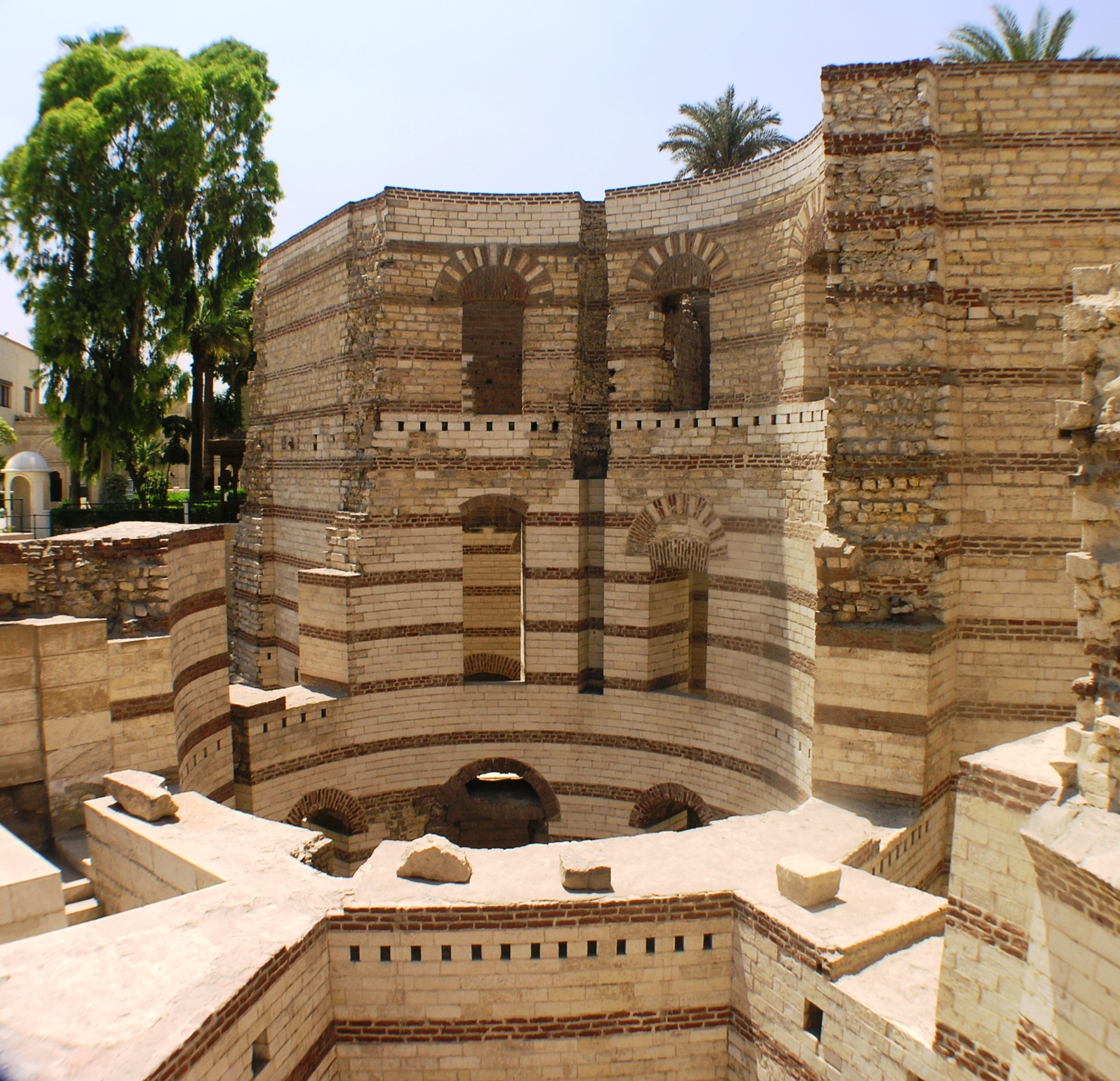
Amr initially halted his campaign at the Babylon Fortress (pictured in 2008), but ultimately forced its Byzantine garrison to evacuate in April 641 after a lengthy siege.

In late 641, Amr besieged Alexandria. It fell virtually without resistance after Cyrus, who had since been restored to office, and Amr finalized a treaty in Babylon guaranteeing the security of Egypt's inhabitants and imposing a poll tax on adult males. The date of the city's surrender was likely November 642. Taking advantage of the uncertain political situation in the wake of Umar's death in 644 and the meager Arab military presence in Alexandria, Emperor Constans II (r. 641–668) dispatched a naval expedition led by a certain Manuel which occupied the city and killed most of its Arab garrison in 645. Alexandria's elite and most of the inhabitants assisted the Byzantines; medieval Byzantine, Coptic and, to a lesser extent, Muslim sources indicate the city was not firmly in Arab hands during the preceding three years. Byzantine forces pushed deeper into the Nile Delta, but Amr forced them back at the Battle of Nikiou. He besieged and captured Alexandria in the summer of 646; most of the Byzantines, including Manuel, were slain, many of its inhabitants were killed and the city was burned until Amr ordered an end to the onslaught. Afterward, Muslim rule in Alexandria was gradually solidified.

In contrast to the disarray of the Byzantine defense, the Muslim forces under Amr's command were unified and organized; Amr frequently coordinated with Caliph Umar and his own troops for all major military decisions. According to the historian Vassilios Christides, Amr "cautiously counterbalanced the superiority in numbers and equipment of the Byzantine army by applying skillful military tactics" and despite the lack of "definite, prepared, long-term plans, the Arab army moved with great flexibility as the occasion arose". In the absence of siege engines, Amr oversaw long sieges of heavily fortified Byzantine positions, most prominently Babylon, cut supply lines and engaged in long wars of attrition. He made advantageous use out of the nomads in his ranks, who were seasoned in hit-and-run tactics, and his settled troops, who were generally more acquainted with siege warfare. His cavalry-dominated army moved through Egypt's deserts and oases with relative ease. Moreover, political circumstances became more favorable to Amr with the death of the hawkish Heraclius and his short-term replacement with the more pacifist Heraklonas and Martina.. si

=== Expeditions in Cyrenaica and Tripolitania ===
After the surrender of Alexandria in 642, Amr marched his army westward, bypassing the fortified Byzantine coastal strongholds of Paraetonium (Marsa Matruh), Appolonia Sozusa (Marsa Soussa) and Ptolemais (Tolmeita), capturing Barca and reaching Torca in Cyrenaica. Toward the end of the year, Amr launched a second cavalry assault targeting Tripoli. The city was heavily fortified by the Byzantines and contained several naval vessels in its harbor. Due to his lack of siege engines, he employed the lengthy siege tactic used in the Egyptian conquest. After about a month, his troops entered Tripoli through a vulnerable point in its walls and sacked the city. Its fall, which entailed the evacuation by sea of the Byzantine garrison and most of the population, is dated to 642 or 643/44. Though the Arab hold over Cyrenaica and Zawila to the far south remained firm for decades except for a short-lived Byzantine occupation in 690, Tripoli was recaptured by the Byzantines a few years after Amr's entry. The region was definitively conquered by the Arabs during the reign of Caliph Abd al-Malik (r. 685–705).

=== Administration ===
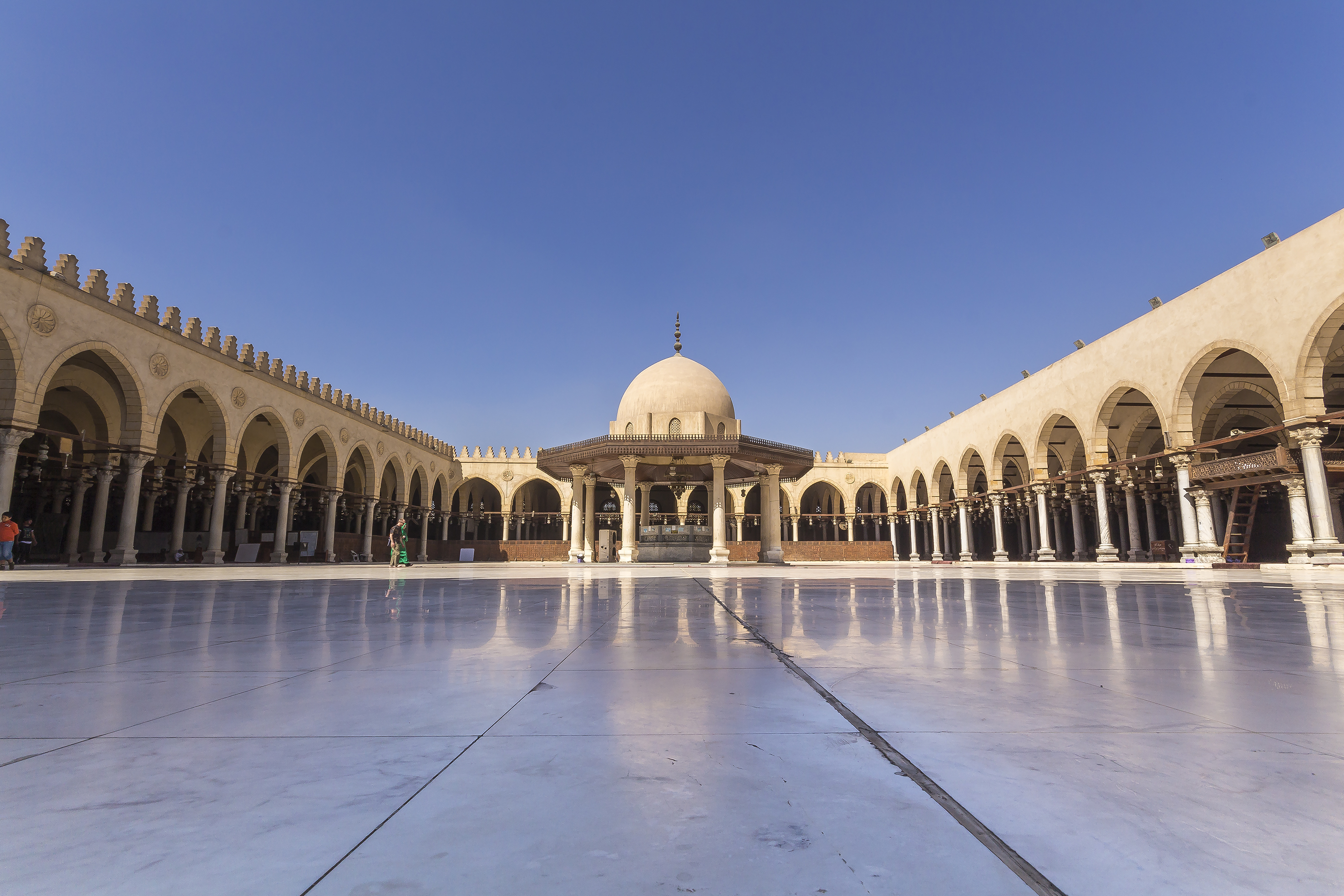
The courtyard of the Amr ibn al-As Mosque in 2013. The mosque was originally founded by Amr in 641 but was redesigned and expanded significantly over the next several centuries.

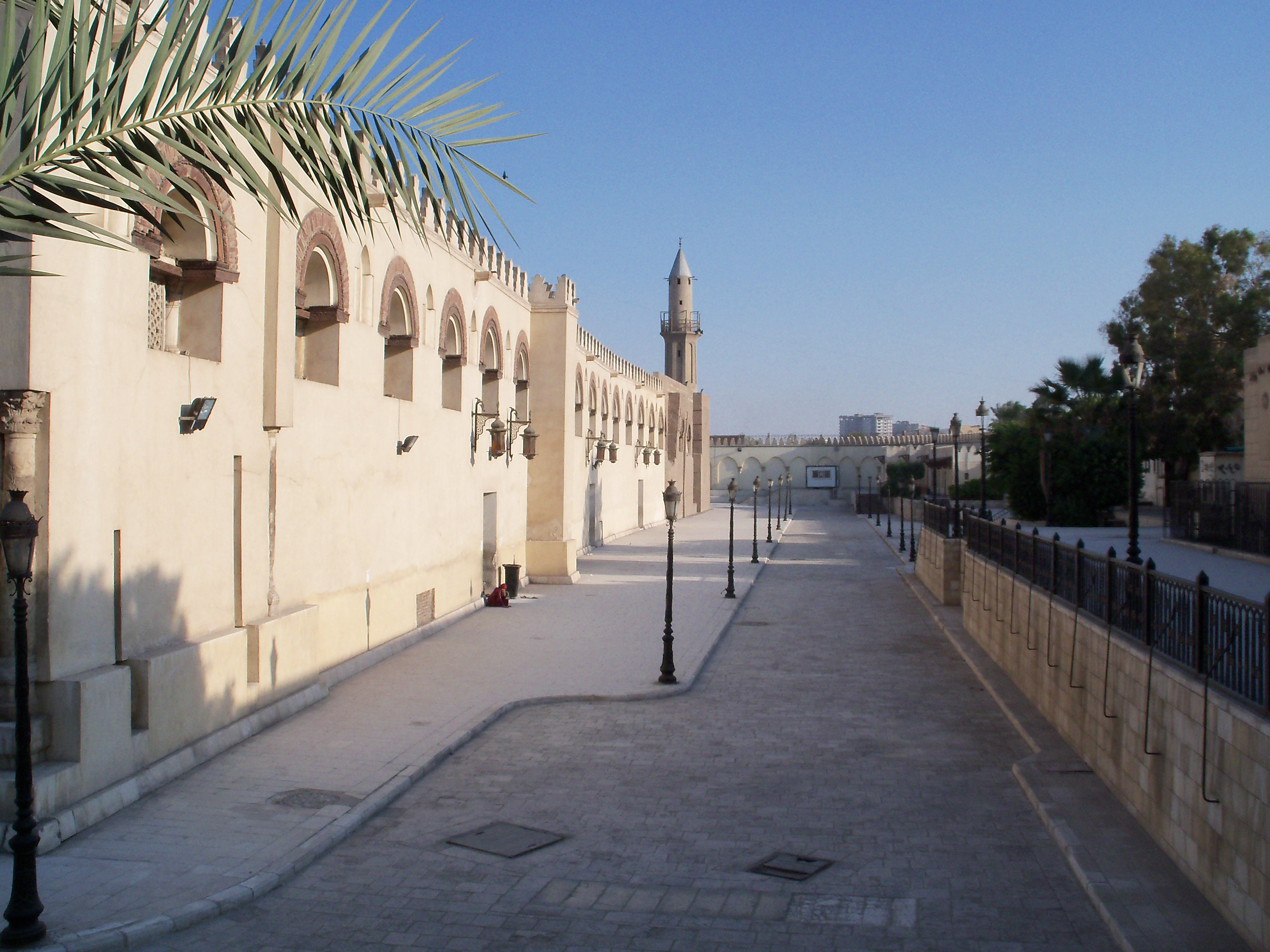
The exterior wall of the mosque in 2011

Amr "regulated the government of the country [Egypt], administration of justice and the imposition of taxes", according to the historian A. J. Wensinck. During his siege of Babylon, Amr had erected an encampment near the fortress. He originally intended for Alexandria to serve as the Arabs' capital in Egypt, but Umar rejected this on the basis that no body of water, i.e. the Nile, should separate the caliph from his army. (Note: The historian Albrecht Noth argues that the Islamic traditional account regarding Amr's intention to establish the Arab capital of Egypt in Alexandria and Caliph Umar's objection is a literary motif. The historian Jelle Bruning, nonetheless, surmises that Umar "wanted close contact between the provincial capital [in Egypt] and the imperial capital [in Medina]", citing the importance of the canal connecting Babylon to the Red Sea.) Instead, following Alexandria's surrender, in 641 or 642, Amr made his encampment near Babylon the permanent garrison town (miṣr) of Fustat, the first town founded by the Arabs in Egypt. Its location along the eastern bank of the Nile River and at the head of the Nile Delta and edge of the Eastern Desert strategically positioned it to dominate the Upper and Lower halves of Egypt. Fustat's proximity to Babylon, where Amr also established an Arab garrison, afforded the Arab settlers a convenient means to employ and oversee the Coptic bureaucratic officials who inhabited Babylon and proved critical to running the day-to-day affairs of the Arab government.

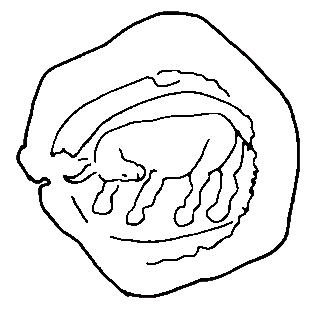
Outline of the Seal of Amr ibn al-As from 643 CE

Amr had the original tents of Fustat replaced with mud brick and baked brick dwellings. Documents found in Hermopolis (al-Ashmunayn) dating from the 640s confirm official orders to forward building materials to Babylon to construct the new city. The city was organized into allotments over an area stretching 5–6 kilometers (3.1–3.7 mi) along the Nile and 1–2 kilometers (0.62–1.24 mi) inland to the east. The allotments were distributed among the components of Amr's army, with priority given to the Quraysh, the Ansar and Amr's personal guard, the 'Ahl al-Rāya' (People of the Banner), which included several Bali tribesmen as a result of their kinship and marital ties to Amr. An opposing theory holds that Amr did not assign the plots; rather, the tribes staked their own claims and Amr established a commission to resolve the ensuing land disputes. At the center of the new capital Amr built a congregational mosque, later known as the Amr ibn al-As Mosque; the original structure was frequently redesigned and expanded between its foundation and its final form in 827. Amr had his own dwelling built immediately east of the mosque and it most likely served as his government headquarters.

In the northwestern part of Alexandria, Amr built a hilltop congregational mosque, later called after him, before the Byzantine occupation of 645/46, after which he built a second called the Mosque of Mercy; neither mosque has been presently identified. Adjacent to the congregational mosque, Amr took personal ownership of a fort, which he later donated for government use. This part of the city became the administrative and social core of Arab settlement in Alexandria. Accounts vary as to the number of troops Amr garrisoned in the city, ranging from 1,000 soldiers from the Azd and Banu Fahm tribes to a quarter of the army which was replaced on a rotational basis every six months.

As per the 641 treaty with Cyrus, Amr imposed a poll tax of two gold dinars on non-Muslim adult males. He imposed other measures, sanctioned by Umar, that entailed the inhabitants' regular provision of wheat, honey, oil and vinegar as a subsistence allowance for the Arab troops. He had these goods stored in a distribution warehouse called dār al-rizq. After taking a census of the Muslims, he further ordered that each Muslim be annually supplied by the inhabitants a highly embroidered wool robe (Egyptian robes were prized by the Arabs), a burnous, a turban, a sirwal (trousers) and shoes. In a Greek papyrus dated to 8 January 643 and containing Amr's seal (a fighting bull), Amr (transliterated as "Ambros") requests fodder for his army's animals and bread for his soldiers from an Egyptian village. According to the historian Martin Hinds, there is "no evidence" that Amr "did anything to streamline the cumbersome fiscal system taken over from the Byzantines; rather, the upheavals of conquest can only have made the system more open to abuse than ever".

After entering Alexandria, Amr invited the Coptic patriarch Benjamin to return to the city after his years of exile under Cyrus. The patriarch maintained close ties with Amr and restored the monasteries of Wadi al-Natrun, including the Saint Macarius Monastery, which functions until the present-day. According to the historian Hugh N. Kennedy, "Benjamin played a major role in the survival of the Coptic Church through the transition to Arab rule".

=== Dismissal and aftermath ===
Amr acted relatively independent as governor and retained much of the surplus tax revenue of the province for the benefit of its troops despite pressure from Umar to forward proceeds to Medina. He also amassed significant personal wealth in Egypt, part of which was confiscated by Muhammad ibn Maslama on Umar's orders. At a certain point, the Caliph separated Upper Egypt from Amr's administration and appointed Abd Allah ibn Sa'd over the region.

Umar's successor Caliph Uthman (r. 644–656) initially kept Amr in his governorship and forged marital links with him by wedding to him his maternal half-sister Umm Kulthum bint Uqba ibn Abi Mu'ayt. Uthman diluted Amr's power in 645/46 by transferring fiscal responsibilities to Ibn Abi Sarh, his own relative, leaving Amr in charge of military affairs. Amr and Ibn Sa'd lodged complaints to Uthman each alleging the other of incompetence, prompting Uthman to dismiss Amr entirely and replace him in his duties with Ibn Sa'd. Uthman's appointee established an effective fiscal system that largely preserved its Byzantine predecessor. Ibn Sa'd reduced the fiscal privileges of Egypt's original Arab military settlers, who had been shown favor by Amr, and secured the remittance of the surplus to Medina. This led to the consternation of the Arab garrisons and the native officials and elite, all of whom were "deprived of the opportunities for self-enrichment which they had hitherto enjoyed", according to Hinds. Open opposition to Ibn Sa'd and Uthman began under the leadership of the Qurayshite Muhammad ibn Abi Hudhayfa in 654/55.

== Conflict with Uthman ==
Upon his return to Medina, Amr openly criticized Uthman. The caliph and Amr engaged in a number of heated public exchanges and, according to a report in the Islamic traditional sources, Amr incited Muhammad's senior companions Ali, Zubayr and Talha ibn Ubayd Allah, as well as the Hajj pilgrims in Mecca, against Uthman. He lobbied Muhammad's wife A'isha for support and the latter pressed Uthman to reappoint Amr to Egypt citing its garrisons' satisfaction with his rule. In a sermon at the mosque in Medina in June 656 and a letter penned to the Muslim leaders in Syria, Uthman mentioned that he had intended to reappoint Amr but did not follow through as a result of the latter's excessive insult. According to the historian Wilferd Madelung, the insult Uthman cited was likely Amr's public reaction to the caliph's statement that the mutinous Egyptian troops who had arrived in Medina to protest the Caliph's policies had withdrawn because they were misinformed: "Fear God, Uthman, for you have ridden over abysses and we have ridden over them with you. So repent to God, that we may repent".

After his last exchange with Uthman, Amr retired to his estate in southern Palestine. The estate was called "Ajlan" after one of his mawālī (non-Arab, Muslim freedmen) and was located in the vicinity of "al-Sab'", which had conventionally been identified with modern Beersheba, but more likely corresponds with Bayt Jibrin, according to the historian Michael Lecker; the medieval historians al-Baladhuri (d. 892) and Yaqut al-Hamawi (d. 1226) also suggest that Ajlan was located in the area of Bayt Jibrin. (Note: The historian Michael Lecker asserts that Ajlan is Khirbet Ajlan, an archaeological mound located north of Tell el-Hesi and southwest of modern Kiryat Gat, while the archaeologist Jeffrey A. Blakely concludes that Ajlan was likely the much larger combined site of Khirbet Tannar and Khirbet Hazzarah located a little over one kilometer to the south of Khirbet Ajlan straddling the banks of the Wadi el-Hesi stream. Blakely further identifies this combined site as the previously unidentified Crusader village "Agelen el Ahsses" and the 16th-century Ottoman-era hamlet "Ajlan".) Amr had likely become owner of the estate through a caliphal grant, though he possibly could have taken possession of it in the course of his conquest of Palestine and his ownership had been confirmed by the caliphs. He lived on the estate, where he derived agricultural revenue, with his sons Muhammad and Abd Allah. (Note: The mother of Amr's eldest son Abd Allah was named Rayta or Hind, the daughter of a certain Munabbih ibn al-Hajjaj. She fought alongside Amr and the Qurayshites against Muhammad at the Battle of Uhud in 625. She later embraced Islam with a group of Qurayshite women in the presence of Muhammad after the conquest of Mecca in 629/30.)

At his estate Amr received news of the siege of Uthman's house and the caliph's subsequent assassination by Amr's Egyptian partisans. The roughly 400–600 Egyptian mutineers had protested Uthman's fiscal centralization policies in Medina and accused him of favoring his relatives over the early Muslim converts. The caliph had initially persuaded them to withdraw, but when they intercepted a letter on their departure ordering Ibn Abi Sarh to punish them, they turned back and assaulted Uthman in his home. In an anecdote cited by al-Baladhuri, Amr is quoted as taking partial credit for Uthman's assassination. Ali succeeded Uthman, but did not reappoint Amr to his post in Egypt. Amr was one of a number of figures held culpable for Uthman's death by the slain caliph's clan, the Banu Umayya (Umayyads), most prominently by Uthman's uterine brother and Amr's former brother-in-law al-Walid ibn Uqba. Nonetheless the governor of Syria, which included Palestine, the Umayyad Mu'awiya ibn Abi Sufyan, had left Amr on his estate undisturbed. As pressure from the Umayyads increased against him, Amr distanced himself from any role in Uthman's death and wrote Mu'awiya to execute or banish the participating Egyptian troops who had been apprehended as they passed through Mu'awiya's jurisdiction on their way back to Egypt.

== Alliance with Mu'awiya ==
After Ali's victory against Zubayr, Talha and Aisha at the Battle of the Camel in Iraq, Mu'awiya, who maintained his opposition to Ali, became the focus of the Caliph's attention. Mu'awiya summoned Amr to discuss an alliance against Ali. In the ensuing negotiations, Amr pressed Mu'awiya for lifetime possession of Egypt, to which Mu'awiya ultimately acceded after being persuaded by his brother Utba ibn Abi Sufyan. The public agreement, composed by Amr's mawlā Wardan and made in Jerusalem, secured Amr's allegiance to Mu'awiya in return for the latter's assistance in gaining control of Egypt from Ali's governor. According to Madelung, the "alliance between Mu'awiya and Amr b. al-As constituted a formidable political force"; in forging the alliance, Mu'awiya sought to benefit from Amr's political acumen, "practical battle experience and sure judgement of military strategy and tactics", as well as his "expertise" and support base in Egypt. Amr became Mu'awiya's chief adviser. To secure the defense of his Syrian realm from Ali's loyalists in Egypt, Amr counseled Mu'awiya to secure the support of the Judhamite chief in Palestine, Natil ibn Qays, by ignoring his seizure of the district treasury; Natil subsequently joined Mu'awiya's cause. Amr then advised Mu'awiya to lead the Syrian army in person against Ali, who began his march toward Syria in late May 657.

When Ali's Iraqi forces set up camp around Siffin, south of the Euphrates town of Raqqa, in early June, Mu'awiya's advance guard led by Abu al-A'war refused them access to the watering places under their control. After Ali protested, Amr advised Mu'awiya to accept their request as preventing access to water might rally the hitherto demotivated Iraqis to a determined fight against the Syrians. Mu'awiya refused and the Iraqis subsequently defeated the Syrians led by Amr and Abu al-A'war in a skirmish known as the "Day of the Euphrates". As the leader of the Syrian cavalry, Amr held the overall field command for Mu'awiya's forces in the ensuing weeks-long Battle of Siffin and on occasion personally participated in direct combat, though without particular distinction. At one point in the battle, he raised a black fabric given to him by Muhammad at the tip of his spear, symbolizing the command role given to him by Muhammad.

As the Iraqis gained the battlefield advantage, Amr proposed to Mu'awiya that their men tie leaves from the Qur'an at the tips of their lances in an appeal to Ali's men to settle the conflict peacefully. It served as a successful ruse which ended the fighting as the battle turned in Ali's favor and sowed uncertainty in Ali's ranks. The Caliph heeded the majority will in his army to settle the matter diplomatically; an arbitration was agreed with Amr representing Mu'awiya and Abu Musa al-Ash'ari representing Ali. Amr met with Ali once and the two exchanged insults, but Ali ultimately agreed to Amr's condition that he omit his caliphal title, amir al-mu'minin (commander of the faithful), from the preliminary arbitration document drafted on 2 August. The omission effectively placed Ali and Mu'awiya on an equal political footing and thereby weakened Ali's leadership position over the Muslim polity.

Amr and Abu Musa likely met twice, at Dumat al-Jandal and then Adhruh, to forge an agreement. At Dumat al-Jandal, Amr succeeded in gaining Abu Musa's recognition that Uthman was wrongfully killed, a verdict opposed by Ali and which strengthened Syrian support for Mu'awiya, who had taken up the cause of revenge for the death of his kinsman Uthman. At the last meeting in Adhruh, the office of the caliphate was discussed, but the meeting ended in violence and without agreement; during the brawl, Amr was physically assaulted by a Kufan partisan of Ali, but the latter was fended off by one of Amr's sons. Abu Musa retired to Mecca, while Amr and the Syrians returned to Mu'awiya and recognized him as amir al-mu'minin before formally pledging allegiance to him in April/May 658. As a result, Amr was among those invoked in a ritual curse issued by Ali during the morning prayers and became the subject of derision among the Kufan core of Ali's supporters.

== Reestablishment in Egypt ==
As early as 656/57, Amr and Mu'awiya persuaded Ibn Abi Hudhayfa, who had seized control of Egypt after Uthman's assassination, to meet them in al-Arish, where they took him captive in a ruse. Amr and Mu'awiya did not advance further than this point and Ibn Abi Hudhayfa was executed. Ali's second governor in Egypt, Qays ibn Sa'd, was dismissed in late 657 due to concerns that he would defect to Mu'awiya and his next appointee, Malik al-Ashtar, died in Qulzum (Suez) on his way to the province. Malik's replacement was Muhammad ibn Abi Bakr, son of the first caliph and a foster son of Ali. Ibn Abi Bakr burned the homes and arrested the families of pro-Uthman mutineers from the Fustat garrison led by Mu'awiya ibn Hudayj and Maslama ibn Mukhallad. The latter two requested intervention by Mu'awiya, who dispatched Amr to Egypt with a 4,000–6,000-strong army. Despite his thirteen-year absence from Egypt, Amr nonetheless mustered the support of Egypt's original Arab military settlers and their sons. In July/August 658, his forces defeated Ali's troops at the Battle of al-Musannah between Heliopolis (Ain Shams) and Fustat. He subsequently captured Fustat. Ibn Hudayj pursued and captured Ibn Abi Bakr and had him executed over the objections of Amr, who had been lobbied by Ibn Abi Bakr's brother Abd al-Rahman to spare his life.

As per his agreement with Mu'awiya, Amr was installed as governor of Egypt for life and ruled as a virtual partner rather than a subordinate of Mu'awiya, who had become caliph after Ali's assassination and his son Hasan's abdication in 661. On 22 January of that year, Amr escaped an assassination attempt by the Kharijite Zadawayh or Amr ibn Bakr, who killed Amr's stand-in for the Friday prayers, Kharija ibn Hudhafa, mistaking the latter for Amr. When the Kharijite was apprehended and brought before him, Amr proclaimed "You wanted me, but God wanted Kharija!" and he personally executed him.

Amr was permitted by the Caliph to retain personally the surplus revenues of the province after the payment of the troops' stipends and other government expenses. He increased the original garrison at Fustat, numbering some 15,000 soldiers, with the Syrian troops he brought with him. According to the historian Clive Foss "Amr ruled the country successfully, and with considerable independence and privilege, until his death".

== Death and legacy ==
A map depicting growth of the Caliphate. The red-lined areas indicate the territories annexed by the Caliphate—namely most of Palestine, Egypt, Cyrenaica and Tripolitania—as a result of Amr's conquests

Amr died of natural causes over the age of 79. Accounts vary regarding the date of his death, though the most credible versions place it in 43 AH (663–664 CE). (Note: Specific dates cited for Amr's death by the Muslim traditional historians include Eid al-Fitr 43 AH/January 664 and March 664.) He was buried at the foot of the Muqattam hills to the east of Fustat. Due to the early Muslims' reticence to mark the graves of their dead, Amr's burial place has not been identified. In a testament to the personal wealth that he accrued, at the time of his death he left seventy sacks of gold dinars. His sons Abd Allah and Muhammad refused inheritance of the sums, which were then confiscated by Mu'awiya. Abd Allah succeeded his father as governor for a few weeks until Mu'awiya replaced him with his own brother Utba.

The traditional Egypt-based Arabic and Coptic sources regard Amr positively. The major source of information about the Muslim conquest of Egypt and the province's early Arab military generations, Ibn Abd al-Hakam (d. 871), commends Amr for his leadership of the Egyptian conquest and as the upholder of the interests of Egypt's troops and their families against the central authorities in Medina and later Damascus. The Egyptian Arab tradition holds that Amr was personally praised by Muhammad and was a man of wisdom and piety on his deathbed. The nearly contemporary Coptic historian John of Nikiu (fl. 680–690), who was generally critical of Arab rule, said of Amr that he "had no mercy on the Egyptians, and did not observe the covenant they had made with him", but also says of him that: "He exacted the taxes which had been determined upon but he took none of the property of the churches, and he committed no act of spoliation or plunder, and he preserved them throughout all his days." In the words of Kennedy, "Of his [Amr's] competence as a military commander and politician there can be no doubt- the results speak for themselves, but he also has a reputation for straight dealing and justice." Amr's roughly two-year conquest of Egypt was the quickest in the history of the early Muslim conquests. Though demographically Egypt remained largely non-Arab and non-Muslim for centuries after the conquest, the country has been continuously ruled by Muslims until the present day.

== Descendants ==
Amr's estates in Palestine remained in the possession of his descendants as late as the 10th or 11th centuries. His granddaughter Umm Abd Allah bint Abd Allah married the Umayyad viceroy of Egypt Abd al-Aziz ibn Marwan (d. 705) and gave birth to his sons Suhayl and Sahl and daughters Sahla and Umm al-Hakam. The estates in Medina that Amr's descendants inherited from him were confiscated by the Abbasids after they took over the Caliphate from the Umayyads in 750. The estates were restored to Amr's family after the intercession of his great-granddaughter Abida al-Hasna bint Shu'ayb ibn Abd Allah, who married the Abbasid prince al-Husayn ibn Abd Allah ibn Ubayd Allah ibn Abbas (d. 758).

== Bibliography ==
- Akbar, Jamel (1989). "Khaṭṭa and the Territorial Structure of Early Muslim Towns". In Grabar, Oleg (ed.). Muqarnas: An Annual on Islamic Art and Architecture, Volume 6. Leiden: Brill. pp. 22–32. ISBN 90-04-09050-9.
- Bewley, Aisha (2000). The Men of Madina by Muhammad Ibn Sa'd, Volume 2. Ta-Ha Publishers. ISBN 978-1897940907.
- Blakely, Jeffrey A. (December 2010). "Ajlan: Locating the Estate of Amr b. al-As". Near Eastern Archaeology. 73 (4): 210–222. doi:10.1086/NEA41103939. JSTOR 25769690. S2CID 166401071.
- Bruning, Jelle (2018). The Rise of a Capital: Al-Fusṭāṭ and Its Hinterland, 18–132/639–750. Leiden and Boston: Brill. ISBN 978-90-04-36635-0.
- Buhl, Fr. (1993) [1913–1936]. "Muḥammad". In Houtsma, M. Th.; Arnold, T.W.; Basset, R.; Hartmann, R. (eds.). Encyclopaedia of Islam, 1st ed. (1913–1936). Vol. 6. p. 669. doi:10.1163/2214-871X_ei1_SIM_4763. ISBN 978-9004082656.
- Charles, Robert H. (1913). The Chronicle of John, Bishop of Nikiu: Translated from Zotenberg's Ethiopic Text.
- Christides, V. (1993). "Miṣr – 1. The Byzantine background, the Arab conquest and the Umayyad period, 602–750". In Bosworth, C. E.; van Donzel, E.; Heinrichs, W. P. & Pellat, Ch. (eds.). The Encyclopaedia of Islam, Second Edition. Volume VII: Mif–Naz. Leiden: E. J. Brill. p. 212–213. ISBN 978-90-04-09419-2.
- Christides, V. (2000). "Ṭarābulus al-Gharb – 2. In pre- and early Islamic times". In Bearman, P. J.; Bianquis, Th.; Bosworth, C. E.; van Donzel, E. & Heinrichs, W. P. (eds.). The Encyclopaedia of Islam, Second Edition. Volume X: T–U. Leiden: E. J. Brill. p. 152–160. ISBN 978-90-04-11211-7.
- Donner, Fred M. (1981). The Early Islamic Conquests. Princeton: Princeton University Press. ISBN 0-691-05327-8.
- Elad, Amikam (2016). The Rebellion of Muḥammad al-Nafs al-Zakiyya in 145/762: Ṭālibīs and Early ʿAbbāsīs in Conflict. Leiden: Brill. ISBN 978-90-04-22989-1.
- Faizer, Rizwi (2011). The Life of Muhammad: Al-Waqidi's Kitab Al-Maghazi. Abingdon, Oxon: Routledge. ISBN 978-0-415-57434-1.
- Foss, Clive (2009a). "Egypt under Muʿāwiya Part I: Flavius Papas and Upper Egypt". Bulletin of the School of Oriental and African Studies. 72 (1): 1–24. doi:10.1017/S0041977X09000019. JSTOR 40378842. S2CID 159785219.
- Foss, Clive (2009b). "Egypt under Muʿāwiya Part II: Middle Egypt, Fusṭāṭ and Alexandria". Bulletin of the School of Oriental and African Studies. 72 (2): 259–278. doi:10.1017/S0041977X09000512. JSTOR 40379004. S2CID 160796986.
- Hawting, G. R., ed. (1996). The History of al-Ṭabarī, Volume XVII: The First Civil War: From the Battle of Siffīn to the Death of ʿAlī, A.D. 656–661/A.H. 36–40. SUNY Series in Near Eastern Studies. Albany, New York: State University of New York Press. ISBN 978-0-7914-2393-6.
- Hinds, Martin (October 1972). "The Murder of the Caliph 'Uthman". International Journal of Middle East Studies. 13 (4): 450–469. doi:10.1017/S0020743800025216. JSTOR 162492. S2CID 159763369.
- Jomier, J. (1965). "Al-Fusṭāṭ". In Lewis, B.; Pellat, Ch. & Schacht, J. (eds.). The Encyclopaedia of Islam, Second Edition. Volume II: C–G. Leiden: E. J. Brill. pp. 957–959. OCLC 495469475.
- Kennedy, Hugh (1998). "Egypt as a Province in the Islamic Caliphate, 641–868". In Petry, Carl F. (ed.). Cambridge History of Egypt, Volume One: Islamic Egypt, 640–1517. Cambridge: Cambridge University Press. pp. 62–85. ISBN 0-521-47137-0.
- Kennedy, Hugh (2004) [1986]. The Prophet and the Age of the Caliphates: The Islamic Near East from the 6th to the 11th Century (Second ed.). Harlow: Longman. ISBN 978-0-582-40525-7.
- Kennedy, Hugh (2007). The Great Arab Conquests: How the Spread of Islam Changed the World We Live In. Philadelphia: Da Capo Press. ISBN 978-0-306-81585-0.
- Lecker, Michael (1987). "A Note on Early Marriage Links between Qurashīs and Jewish Women". Jerusalem Studies in Arabic and Islam. 10: 17–40.
- Lecker, Michael (1989). "The Estates of 'Amr b. al-'Āṣ in Palestine: Notes on a New Negev Arabic Inscription". Bulletin of the School of Oriental and African Studies, University of London. 52 (1): 24–37. doi:10.1017/S0041977X00023041. JSTOR 617911. S2CID 163092638.
- Lecker, M. (1997). "Ṣiffīn". In Bosworth, C. E.; van Donzel, E.; Heinrichs, W. P. & Lecomte, G. (eds.). The Encyclopaedia of Islam, Second Edition. Volume IX: San–Sze. Leiden: E. J. Brill. pp. 552–556. ISBN 978-90-04-10422-8.
- Madelung, Wilferd (1997). The Succession to Muhammad: A Study of the Early Caliphate. Cambridge: Cambridge University Press. ISBN 0-521-56181-7.
- Mayerson, Philip (1964). "The First Muslim Attacks on Southern Palestine (A.D. 633–634)". Transactions and Proceedings of the American Philological Association. 95: 155–199. doi:10.2307/283789. JSTOR 283789.
- McDonald, M.V., ed. (1987). The History of al-Ṭabarī, Volume VII: The Foundation of the Community: Muḥammad at Madina, A.D. 622–626. SUNY Series in Near Eastern Studies. Albany, New York: State University of New York Press. ISBN 978-0-88706-344-2.
- ibn Sa'd, Muhammad (1905). Sachau, E. (ed.). Biographien Muhammeds: seiner Gefährten und der späteren Träger des Islams bis zum Jahre 230 der Flucht. Vol. 5. Leiden: Brill.
- Raisuddin, Abu Nayeem Muhammad (April 1981). "Amr ibn al-As and His Conquest of Egypt". Islamic Culture. 55 (4): 277–290.
- Scanlon, George T. (June 1968). "Fustat and the Islamic Art of Egypt". Archaeology. 21 (3): 188–195. JSTOR 41667856.
- Sijpesteijn, Petra M. (October 2014). "An Early Umayyad Papyrus Invitation for the Ḥajj". Journal of Near Eastern Studies. 73 (2): 179–190. doi:10.1086/677240. hdl:1887/85169. JSTOR 10.1086/677240. S2CID 162233422.
- Sourdel, D. (1965). "Filasṭīn –I. Palestine under Islamic Rule". In Lewis, B.; Pellat, Ch. & Schacht, J. (eds.). The Encyclopaedia of Islam, Second Edition. Volume II: C–G. Leiden: E. J. Brill. pp. 910–913. OCLC 495469475.
- Trombley, Frank R. (2013). "Fiscal documents from the Muslim conquest of Egypt: military supplies and administrative dislocation, ca 639–644". Revue des Études Byzantines. 71: 5–38. doi:10.3406/rebyz.2013.4989.
- Wellhausen, Julius (1927). The Arab Kingdom and Its Fall. Translated by Margaret Graham Weir. Calcutta: University of Calcutta.
- Wensinck, A. J. (1960). "ʿAmr b. al-ʿĀṣ al-Sahmī". In Gibb, H. A. R.; Kramers, J. H.; Lévi-Provençal, E.; Schacht, J.; Lewis, B. & Pellat, Ch. (eds.). The Encyclopaedia of Islam, Second Edition. Volume I: A–B. Leiden: E. J. Brill. p. 451. OCLC 495469456.
- al-Rawas, Isam Ali Ahmed (1990). Early Islamic Oman (ca - 622/280-893): A Political History (Doctoral thesis). Durham University.

Preceded by Muhammad ibn Abi Bakr	Governor of Egypt; 658–664	Succeeded by Utba ibn Abi Sufyan
New title	Governor of Egypt; 640–646	Succeeded by Abd Allah ibn Sa'd
