= Bali (tribe) =

Arab tribe

Balī (Arabic: بلي) is an Arab tribe present in northwestern Saudi Arabia, Jordan and historically in Egypt and Sudan and a major component of the Quda'a tribal grouping. In the pre-Islamic period, the southern branches of the tribe inhabited northwestern Arabia and developed close ties with Jewish communities resident in its oases, while the northern branch established itself in Transjordan and served as auxiliaries of the Byzantine Empire. With the advent of Islam, Bali townspeople in Medina embraced the new religion and several were slain fighting the Quraysh of Mecca.

The Bali played a prominent role in the Muslim conquest of Egypt and a large part of the tribe was transferred to the region. They initially had their settlements in Middle Egypt but ultimately migrated to the Sudan during Mamluk rule and significantly contributed to the region's Arabization and Islamization. The tribe remained active in Arabia as late as World War I and the border wars between the Emirate of Transjordan and Saudi Arabia until 1932.

== History ==
=== Pre-Islamic period and lifetime of Muhammad ===
The Bali were a part of the Quda'a tribal confederation. Their progenitor was eponymous Bali ibn Amr ibn al-Hafi ibn Quda'a. They originally inhabited the part of the northern Hejaz (western Arabia) north of Wadi Idam as far as the settlements of Shaghab, Bada and the Tayma oasis; their tribal territory was wedged between the Juhaynah, another Quda'a tribe, to the south and the Judham to the north. Along with the Juhayna and the Quda'a subtribe of Banu Udhrah the Bali migrated to Wadi al-Qura, which was settled and cultivated by Jews. The Quda'a tribes entered into an agreement with the latter whereby the Jews paid them in return for protection from other nomadic tribes. This agreement held until the advent of Islam in the 620s, after which the Banu Udhrah gained ownership of the land by a grant from the Islamic prophet Muhammad, though the Jews were kept in place and forwarded a fixed annual payment.

As a result of internal fighting within the Bali, one of its clans, the Banu Hishna, fled to the protection of the Jewish settlers in Tayma and converted to Judaism. Afterward, a number of the Banu Hishna refugees left for Medina, the seat of Muhammad, and embraced Islam. Three clans of the Bali were counted among the Jewish clans of Medina at this time. The Bali allied with the Ansar tribes of Medina and seven of the seventy Ansari delegates who gave oaths of allegiance to Muhammad at the meeting of Aqaba hailed from the Bali. Several Bali tribesmen were killed fighting on the side of Muhammad during the conflict with the Quraysh of Mecca as early as the Battle of Badr in 624. One of their clans, the Banu Ju'ayl, were given tax privileges by Muhammad akin to those given to the Quraysh following that tribes conversion to Islam in 630.

By dint of their strategic positions in the northern Hejaz, the Bali were viewed as indispensable by the Muslims and further efforts were made to gain the entire tribe's allegiance. Though the settled Bali tribesmen of Medina had joined the Muslims, their nomadic counterparts likely remained outside Islamic influence and neutral relations existed between them and Muhammad. The northern branches of the Bali resident in the Balqa (central Transjordan), namely the Banu Irasha, were ardent opponents of the Muslims and fought as auxiliaries of the Byzantine Empire. They formed a major contingent and provided the commander of the army that defeated the Muslims at the Battle of Mu'ta in 629. Their increased gathering in the northern Hejaz may have motivated Muhammad to dispatch the Qurayshite commander Amr ibn al-As, whose mother or grandmother was a Bali woman, to recruit southern Bali tribesmen, particularly from the Banu Sa'dullah, during a raid against the northern Bali at Dhat al-Salasil in 629. In 630/31, a large delegation of southern Bali chieftains embraced Islam during a meeting with Muhammad.

=== Early Muslim conquests and migrations in the Nile Valley ===
The Bali of Syria were split in their allegiances during the Muslim conquest of the region in 634–638, with some clans defecting to the Muslims, while others continued to fight in the armies of Byzantium, including during the Battle of Yarmouk in 636. Bali tribesmen formed a significant complement of the Arab troops commanded by Amr ibn al-As in the conquest of Egypt in 639–641. Amr fought under the banner of the tribe. The Bali clans of Syria, representing a third of the Quda'a's overall strength in Syria, were transferred to Egypt on the orders of Caliph Umar (r. 634–644). A member of the tribe, Abd al-Rahman ibn Udays al-Balawi, was at the head of mutinous Egyptian troop that took part in the siege of Uthman, during which the caliph was killed. He was later apprehended and executed by the governor of Syria Mu'awiya ibn Abi Sufyan.

Early on the Bali tribes in Egypt established their pastures in Akhmim, Asyut and Ushmun in Middle Egypt. The Fatimid rulers of Egypt in the 10th century expelled the Bali and Juhayna further south into Upper Egypt after territorial disputes with Qurayshite tribal newcomers. In 1170, the Bali rebelled against the Ayyubid iqta (e.g. fief) holders. From 1252/53, they became a persistent opponent of the Ayyubids' Mamluk successors and rebelled against their authority on several occasions throughout the 13th century.

Following a major rebellion against the Mamluks by the Juhayna in the mid-14th century, the Bali and Juhayna migrated southward into the region constituting modern Sudan. The two tribes significantly contributed to the Arabization and Islamization of the indigenous Beja and Baggara tribes. As a testament to the influence of the Bali, as late as the early 20th century, the Beja called the Arabic language "Balawiyyat" (language of the Bali).

=== Modern era ===
During World War I, in 1918, the Bali ultimately sided with the Arab forces of the Hashemite Sharif Hussein against the Ottomans. After the Hashemites were ousted from the Hejaz, part of the tribe supported their Saudi replacements, while a number of rebellious groups defected to the Hashemites based in the Emirate of Transjordan. In 1932, they took part in the raids against Saudi territory south of Aqaba, which the Saudis repulsed. The Bali continue to inhabit the western coastlands of the Hejaz.

== Bibliography ==
- Behnstedt, Peter; Woidich, Manfred (2018). "The Formation of the Egyptian Arabic Dialect Area". In Holes, Clive (ed.). Arabic Historical Dialectology: Linguistic and Sociolinguistic Approaches. Oxford: Oxford University Press. pp. 64–94. ISBN 978-0-19-870137-8.
- Crecelius, Daniel; Bakr, Abd al-Wahhab (1991). Al-Damurdashi's Chronicle of Egypt, 1688-1755: Al-Durra Al-muṣāna Fī Akhbār al-Kinana. Leiden, New York, Copenhagen and Koln: Brill. ISBN 90-04-09408-3.
- Donner, Fred M. (1981). The Early Islamic Conquests. Princeton: Princeton University Press. ISBN 9781400847877.
- Kister, M. J. (1986). "Kuḍāʿa". In Bosworth, C. E.; van Donzel, E.; Lewis, B. & Pellat, Ch. (eds.). The Encyclopaedia of Islam, Second Edition. Volume V: Khe–Mahi. Leiden: E. J. Brill. pp. 315–318. ISBN 978-90-04-07819-2.
- Northrup, Linda S. (1998). From Slave to Sultan: The Career of Al-Manṣūr Qalāwūn and the Consolidation of Mamluk Rule in Egypt and Syria (678-689 A.H./1279-1290 A.D.). Proff, Eurasburg, Germany: Franz Steiner Verlag Stuttgart. ISBN 3-515-06861-9.
- Schleifer, J. (1993). "Balī". Encyclopaedia of Islam, First Edition (1913-1936), Volume 2 Bābā Fighānī—Dwīn. Leiden. ISBN 9789004097889. OCLC 657301924.
