= Rashidun conquests under Umar =

Muslim conquests under Umar, 634–644

- 634–644
Ridda wars	Rashidun conquests under Uthman
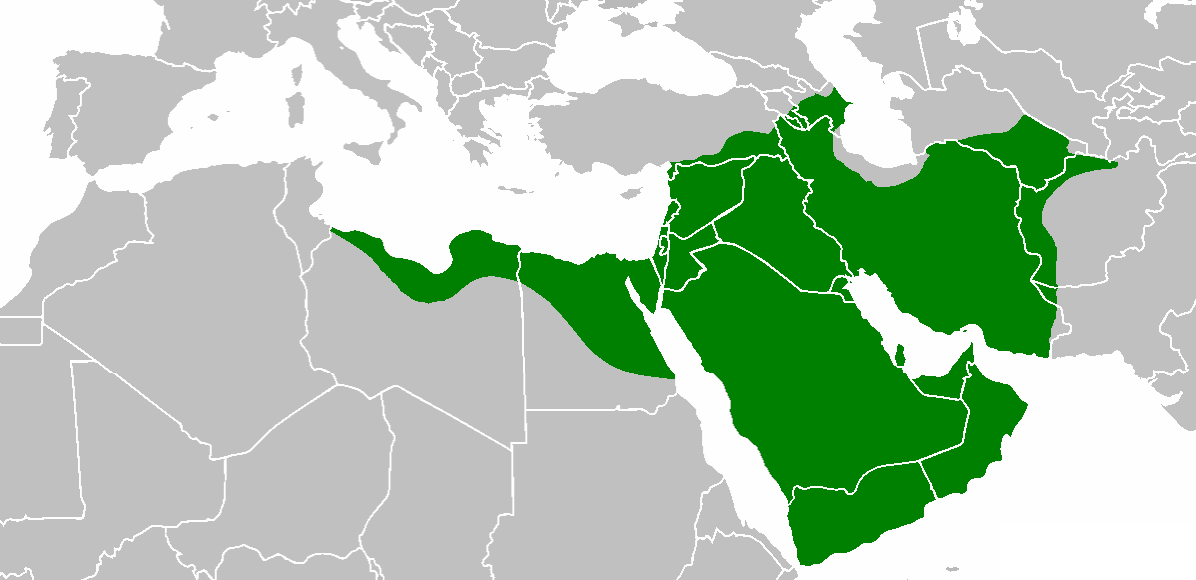
- Rashidun Caliphate under Umar ibn al-Khattāb in 644.
- Location: Rashidun Caliphate
- Monarch: Umar
- Key events: Battle of Ajnadayn; Battle of Yarmouk; Siege of Aelia; Conquest of Egypt; Conquest of Armenia; Conquest of Persia; Battle of Nahavand; Battle of Makran

Umar ibn al-Khattāb was the second Rashidun caliph during 634–644. His caliphate is notable for its vast conquests. Aided by brilliant field commanders, his reign saw incorporation of present-day Iraq, Iran, Azerbaijan, Armenia, Georgia, Syria, Jordan, Palestine, Lebanon, Egypt, and parts of Afghanistan, Turkmenistan and south-western Pakistan into the Caliphate. During his reign, the Byzantines lost more than three-fourths of their territory and the Sassanid Empire almost all of its territories.

Historians estimate that more than 4,050 cities were conquered during the reign of Umar ibn al-Khattāb.

== Conquest of the Levant and Upper Iraq (634–638) ==
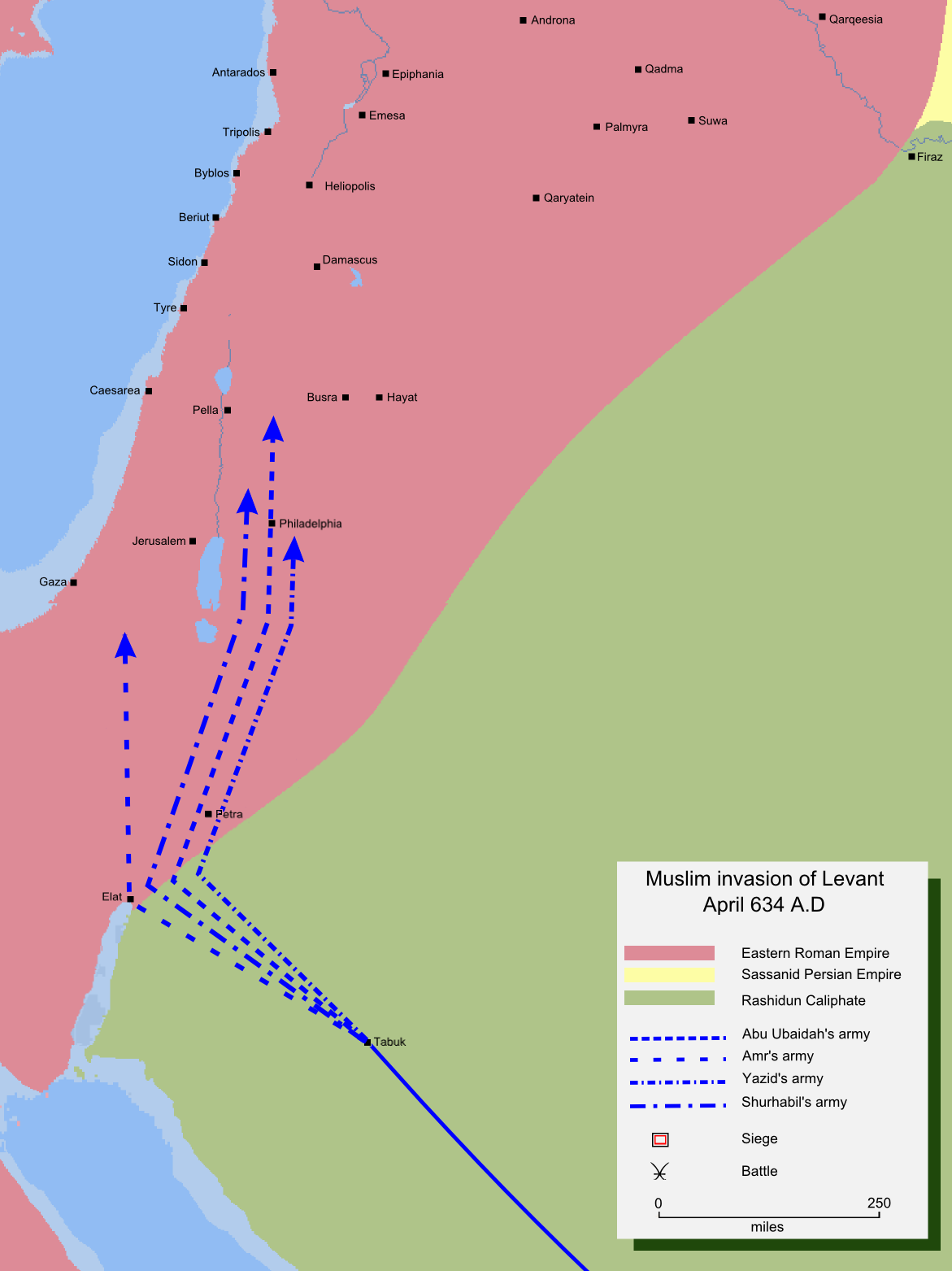
Map detailing Rashidun Caliphate's invasion of the Levant.

Muslim forces invaded the neighboring Eastern Roman Empire in 634 soon after the Conquest of Iraq in 633 during the reign of Caliph Abu Bakr. Damascus fell in September 634 and Emesa in March 635. In the year 635, Emperor Heraclius allied with Sassanid Persian Emperor Yazdegerd III on the latter's request to crush the Muslim power. A plan was agreed to launch a massive counterattack against Muslims in Iraq and Syria simultaneously to force them to retreat to Arabia where they could be dealt with later, either through invasion or economic blockade.

The Rashidun caliphate dealt the Byzantines crushing defeats at the battles of Ajnadayn and Fahl. These significantly reduced the capacity of Byzantine army to operate in southern Syria and, according to historian Ross Burns, the massive losses from these battles practically wiped out the "southern Damascus shield", the Imperial forces which protected southern Syria.

Caliph Umar ibn Al-Khattāb successfully confronted the alliance by putting pressure on the Byzantines, while engaging Yazdegerd III in negotiations. This rendered the alliance weak and a would-be decisive plan was aborted. The Byzantine forces were decisively defeated in Battle of Yarmouk in August 636, while in the Iraqi theater the Persian army was defeated in the Battle of Qadisiyyah three months later in November 636.

=== Defense of Emesa and Conquest of Upper Mesopotamia ===
A map of al-Jazira region (Upper Mesopotamia) in the 8th century. Iyad played a leading role in the Muslim conquest of the region.

After the defeat in the Battle of Yarmouk, Heraclius mounted a counterattack operation in Syria. Heraclius sought help from the Christian Arab tribes of al-Jazira, which came mostly from two cities along the Euphrates river, Circesium and Hīt. The tribes mustered a large army and marched against Emesa where Abu Ubaydah had set up his military headquarters. As the Christian Arabs contingents besieged Emesa, Khalid appealed to Abu Ubaydah to be allowed to lead a sally outside the wall. However, Abu Ubaidah decided it would be better should to wait for reinforcements The sieges of Circessium and Hit by troops under Iyadh occurred simultaneously as the siege of Emesa. At first the Muslims faced difficulty at Hit as the defenders dug a moat around the city, but eventually the Muslim army was able to penetrate it. Meanwhile, Circesium was captured from the Byzantines without resistance by a Muslim army commanded by Habib. Though many Muslim sources state this occurred in 637, Maximillan Streck stated it is more likely to have happened in 640. As response to the siege of Emesa, Iyad was tasked by caliph Umar through his superior, Abu Ubaydah, to invade Al-Jazira.

When Abu Ubayda died in 639, Caliph Umar appointed Iyad in his place as the ʿamal (governor) of Hims, Qinnasrin (Chalcis) and al-Jazira with instructions to conquer the latter territory from its Byzantine commanders because they had refused to pay the tributes promised to the Muslims in 638. By the time Iyad was given his assignment, all of Syria had been conquered by the Muslims, leaving the Byzantine garrisons in al-Jazira isolated from the empire. In August 639, Iyad led a 5,000-strong army toward Raqqa (Kallinikos) in al-Jazira and raided the city's environs. He encountered resistance from its defenders, prompting him to withdraw and send smaller units to make raids around Raqqa, seizing captives and harvests. After five or six days of these raids, Raqqa's patrician negotiated the surrender of the city to Iyad. According to historian Michael Meinecke, Iyad captured the city in 639 or 640. After Raqqa, Iyad proceeded toward Harran, where his progress was stalled. He diverted part of his army to Edessa, which ultimately capitulated after negotiations. Iyad then received Harran's surrender and dispatched Safwan ibn Mu'attal al-Sulami and his own kinsman Habib ibn Maslama al-Fihri to seize Samosata, which also ended in a negotiated surrender after Muslim raiding of its countryside. By 640, Iyad had successively conquered Saruj, Jisr Manbij and Tell Mawzin. Before the capture of Tell Mawzin, Iyad attempted to take Ras al-Ayn, but retreated after stiff resistance. Later, he dispatched Umayr ibn Sa'd al-Ansari to take the city. Umayr first assaulted the rural peasantry and seized cattle in the town's vicinity. The inhabitants barricaded inside the walled city and inflicted heavy losses on the Muslim forces, before ultimately capitulating. About the same time, Iyad besieged Samosata in response to a rebellion, the nature of which is not specified by al-Baladhuri, and stationed a small garrison in Edessa after the city's inhabitants violated their terms of surrender.

The counter sieges carried out by Iyad did not stop with Circesium and Hit, as Iyadh further sent Walid ibn Uqba to subdue the fortresses of the tribe of Rabi'a and Tanukhid. After Samosata, al-Baladhuri, states that Iyad subdued a string of villages "on the same terms" as Edessa's surrender. Between the end of 639 and December 640, Iyad and his lieutenants subdued, in succession, Circesium (al-Qarqisiya), Amid, Mayyafariqin, Nisibin, Tur Abdin, Mardin, Dara, Qarda and Bazabda. In the case of Raqqa (Kallinikos to the Byzantines), the peasants outside the city walls were defended by the Arab Christian nomads. There, the Muslim forces compelled the city's leaders, facing the prospect of starvation, to surrender within five or six days. Since its capture by Muslims it has figured in Arabic sources as al-Raqqah. Meanwhile, caliph Umar personally led reinforcements from Medina, which joined with reinforcements from Iraq led by al-Qa'qa. Realizing the threat from the combined forced, along with Iyad's invasions of their homeland in Jazira, the Christian Arabs immediately abandoned the siege and hastily went to defend their homeland. By the time the Christian Arab left, Khalid and his mobile guard had been reinforced by 4000 soldiers under Qa'qa from Iraq, and were now given permission by Abu Ubaydah to came out of the fort and pursue the enemy.

After the successful defense of Emesa, which done simultaneously with the conquest of upper Mesopotamia, the Muslim armies split up. Shurhabil and Amr's corps moved south to capture Palestine, while Abu Ubaidah and Khalid, with a relatively larger corps, moved north to conquer Northern Syria. While the Muslims were occupied at Fahl, Heraclius, sensing an opportunity, quickly sent an army under General Theodras to recapture Damascus, where a small Muslim garrison was left. Shortly thereafter, the Muslims, having just won the Battle of Fahl, moved to Emesa. In the meantime, the Byzantine army split in two, one deployed at Maraj al Rome (Beqaa Valley) led by Schinos; the other, commanded by Theodras, stationed to the west of Damascus (Al-Sabboura region). During the night, Theodras advanced to Damascus to launch a surprise attack. Khalid's spy informed him about the move and Khalid moved quickly towards Damascus with his mobile guard. While Abu Ubaidah fought and defeated the Roman army under Schinos, Khalid attacked and defeated Theodras. A week later, Abu Ubaida himself moved towards Baalbek, where the great Temple of Jupiter stood. In May 636, Heliopolis surrendered to the Muslims after little resistance and agreed to pay tribute. Abu Ubaidah sent Khalid straight towards Emesa.

=== Siege of Jerusalem and Asia Minor conquest ===
Muslim victories pertinently ended Byzantine rule south of Anatolia, and Jerusalem fell in April 637 after a prolonged siege, Umar personally came to receive the key to the city by the Greek Orthodox patriarch, Sophronius, and was invited to offer prayers at the Church of the Holy Sepulchre. Umar chose to pray some distance from the Church, so as not to endanger its status as a Christian temple. Fifty-five years later, the Mosque of Omar was constructed on the site where he prayed. After the fall of Jerusalem, Umar permitted Jews to practice their religion freely and live in Jerusalem.

The conquest of Levant was completed in 637 after the last relentless resistance by Byzantines at Battle of Iron bridge, which resulted in Muslim occupation of Antioch, capital of eastern zone of Byzantine Empire in October 637. Emperor Heraclius attempt to capture northern Syria in 638, with the aid of Christian Arabs of Jazira, prompted Muslims to invade Jazira (Mesopotamia) in 638 and captured Marash in the Siege of Germanicia, securing the eastern flank of Syria from Byzantine attacks in future, soon after the occupation of Jazira, Muslim columns marched north in Anatolia, invaded and plundered Byzantine provinces of Armenia, these were however only preemptive attacks on Armenia to eliminate all Byzantine presence north of Syria, Armenia was annexed in 643 during the Conquest of Persian Empire. These preemptive attack resulted in the creation of a buffer zone or no man's land in south-eastern Anatolia and Armenia, which would eventually evolve into the al-'Awasim. It was exactly what Umar wanted, as he is quoted saying

I wish there were a wall of fire between us and the Romans, so that nor we can cross into their land neither they could in ours

The Byzantine empire already exhausted after major defeats in Yarmouk and Northern Syria was left vulnerable to Muslims' attacks and its very existence in Anatolia was threatened. Umar apparently was not interested in occupation of Anatolia, it had a cold and mountainous terrain with no economic incentives and his main purpose of these conquests was capturing Jerusalem, soon after the occupation of Byzantine Armenia, the time when chaos was at its peak in Byzantium, Umar had already rejected Khalid and Abu Ubaidah's proposal of invading Anatolia. Moreover, Umar, due to his strong desire to consolidate his rule in the conquered land and owing to his non-offensive policy left the remaining Byzantine empire on its own. The situation was a stalemate, Umar had power but not desire to cross into Byzantine Empire, and Emperor Heraclius had desire but not left powerful enough to roll back his former rich provinces. For the security of northern Syria, Umar issued orders for annual raids into Byzantine territories in Anatolia and Muslims raided as far as Phrygia.

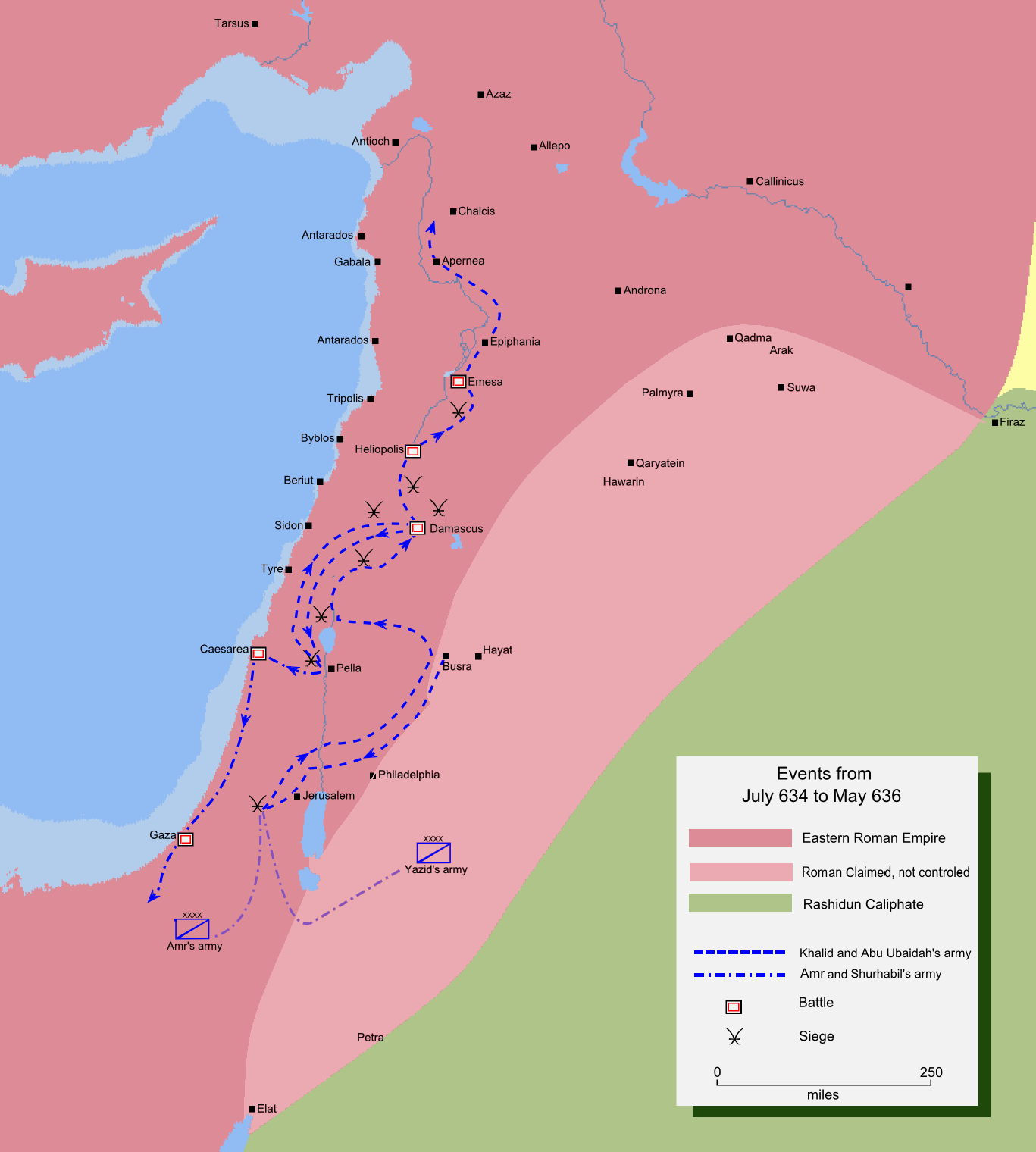
Map detailing the route of Muslim's invasion of central Syria.

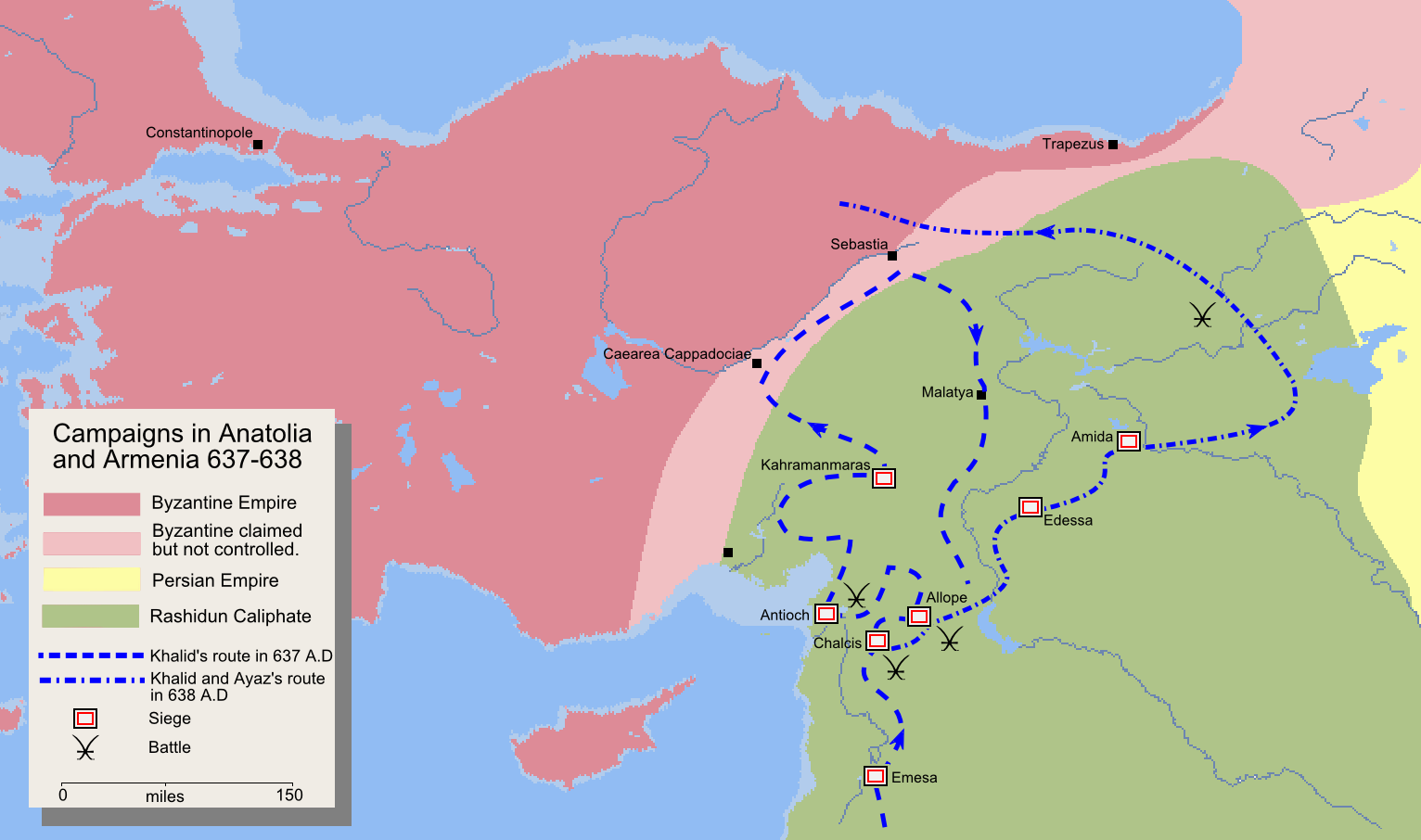
Map detailing the route of Khalid ibn Walid's invasion of Syria.

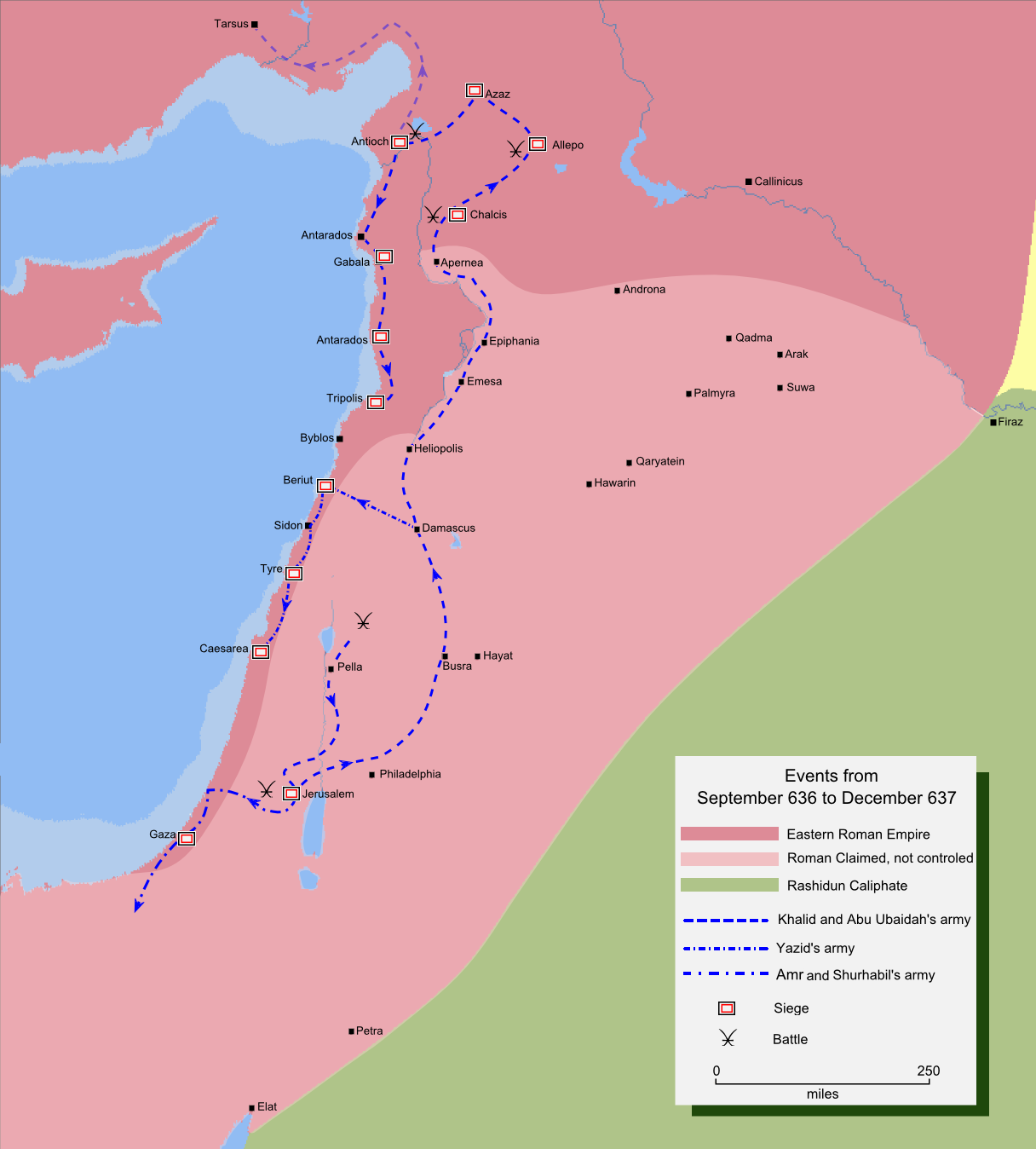
Map detailing the route of Muslim's invasion of northern Syria.

== Conquest of Africa (640–643) ==
After losing the Levant, the economic lifeline and main source of manpower of Byzantines and Armenia, Emperor Heraclius was left incapable of any military come back. As a result, he focused on consolidating his power in Egypt. During his visit to Syria in 637 to receive the surrender of Jerusalem, Amr ibn al-Aas tried to convince Umar to invade Egypt, but Umar rejected on the grounds that Muslim rule in Syria was still not firm. After the great plague in 639, Umar paid another visit to Syria and was again persuaded by Amr to invade Egypt. Amr convinced Umar that Byzantine influence in Egypt was a continuous threat to Muslim rule in Palestine and that Egypt was a rich land that could provide Muslims with immense wealth, economical stability as well as a strategic location for trade with North Africa and Mediterranean. Initially hesitant, Umar rejected the proposal and is reported to have said "Life of my one soldier is dearer to me than a million Dirham."

However, he eventually decided to put the matter to the Majlis al Shura (parliament) in Madinah. Once approved by the parliament Umar issued orders for the invasion of Egypt in December 639. The conquest was completed in 642 on the eve of Muslim conquest of Persian highlands.

=== Conquest of Egypt ===
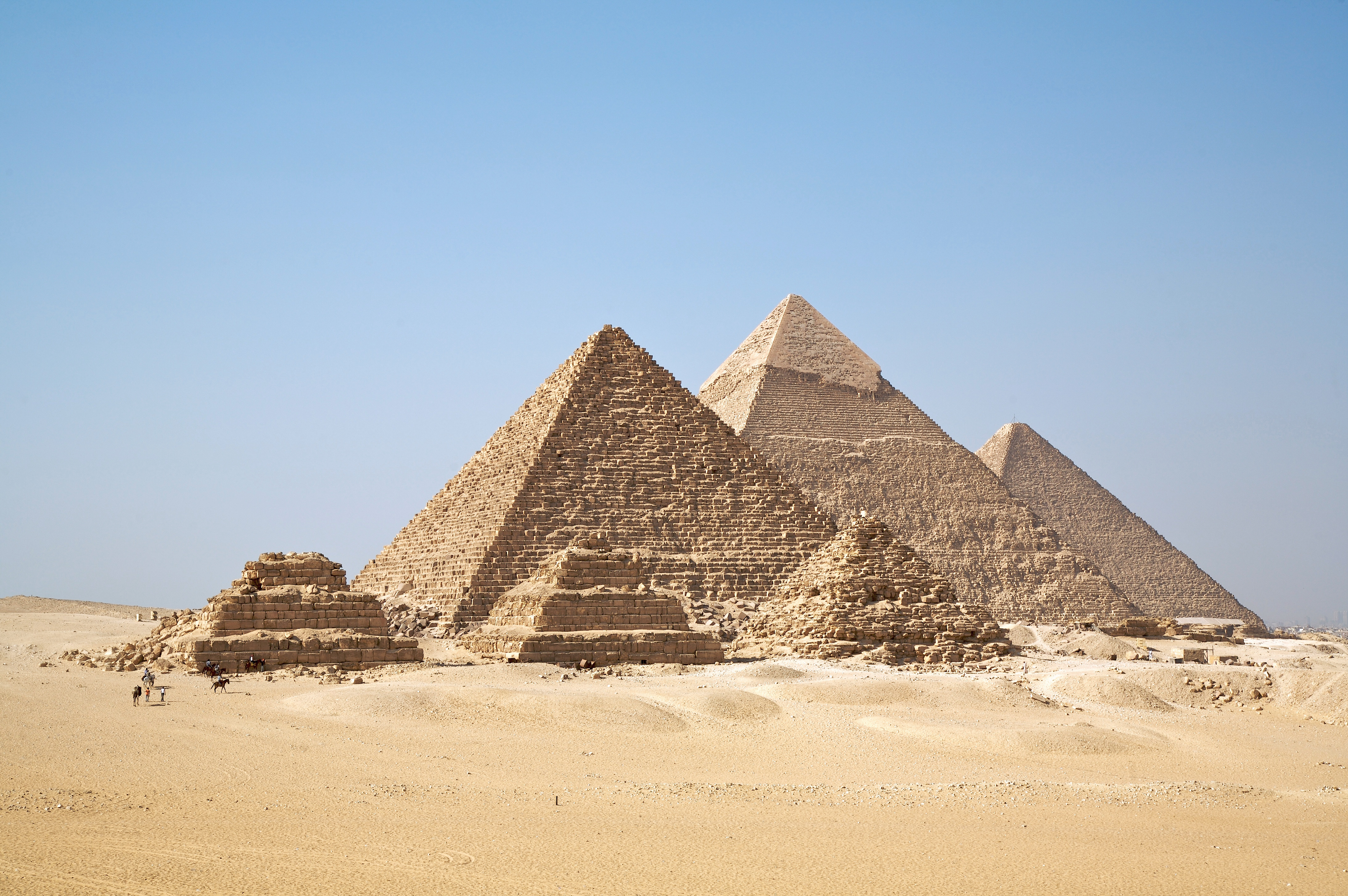
Pyramids of Giza

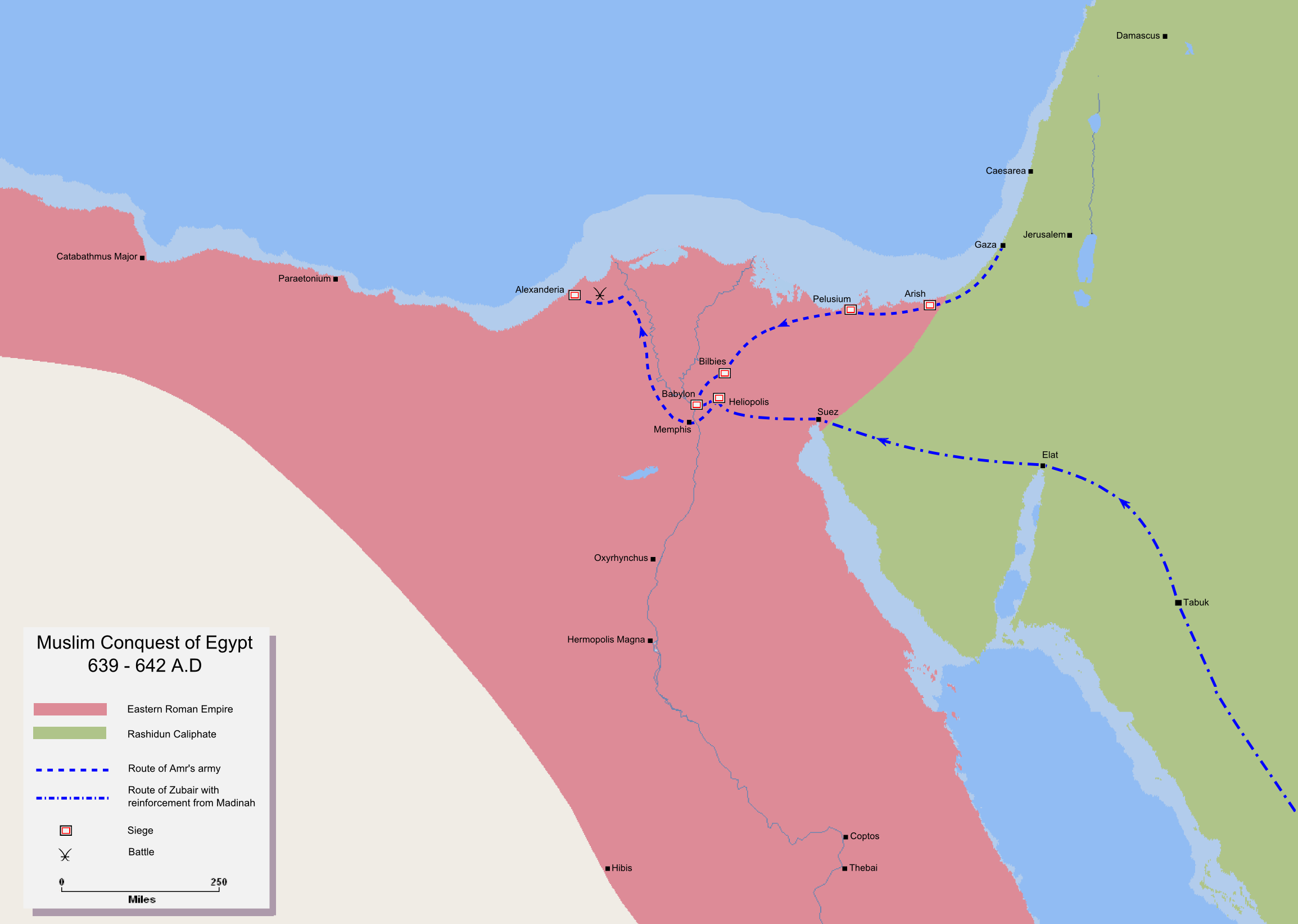
Map detailing the route of Muslim's invasion of Egypt

In December 639, 'Amr ibn al-'As left for Egypt with a force of 4,000 troops. Most of the soldiers belonged to the Arab tribe of 'Ak, but Al-Kindi mentioned that one third of the soldiers belonged to the Arab tribe of Ghafik. The Arab soldiers were also joined by some Roman and Persian converts to Islam. However, 'Umar, the Muslim caliph, reconsidered his orders to Amr and considered it foolhardy to expect to conquer such a large country as Egypt with a mere 4,000 soldiers. Accordingly, he wrote a letter to 'Amr ordering him to come back. The messenger, 'Uqbah ibn 'Amr, caught up with Amr at Rafah, a little short of the Egyptian frontier. Guessing what might be in the letter, 'Amr ordered the army to quicken its pace. Turning to 'Uqbah, 'Amr said that he would receive the caliph's letter from him when the army had halted after the day's journey. 'Uqbah, unaware of the contents of the letter, agreed and marched along with the army. The army halted for the night at Shajratein, a little valley near the city of El Arish, which 'Amr knew to be beyond the Egyptian border. When 'Umar received the reply from 'Amr, he decided to watch further developments and to start concentrating fresh forces at Madinah that could be dispatched to Egypt as reinforcements. On Eid al-Adha, the Muslim army marched from Shajratein to El Arish, a small town lacking a garrison. The town put up no resistance, and the citizens offered allegiance on the usual terms.

In of December 639 or early January 640, the Muslim army reached Pelusium, a garrison city considered to be the eastern gateway to Egypt at the time. The siege of the town dragged on for two months. In February 640, an assault group, led by the prominent Huzaifah ibn Wala, successfully captured the fort and city. Armanousa, the daughter of the Egyptian governor, Cyrus, who, after fiercely resisting the Muslims in Pelusium, fell into their hands but was sent to her father in the Babylon Fortress. The manpower losses incurred by the Muslim army were ameliorated by the number of Sinai Bedouins, who, taking the initiative, had joined them in conquering Egypt. The Bedouins belonged to the tribes of Rashidah and Lakhm. The ease with which Pelusium fell to the Muslims and the lack of Byzantine reinforcements during the month-long siege is often attributed to the treachery of Cyrus, who was also the Monothelite/Monophysite Patriarch of Alexandria. After the fall of Pelusium, the Muslims marched to Belbeis, 65 km (40 mi) from Memphis via desert roads, and besieged it. At the end of the five days, the two monks and the general decided to reject Islam and the jizya and fight the Muslims, thus disobeying Cyrus, who wanted to surrender and pay jizya. Cyrus left for the Babylon Fortress. The battle resulted in a Muslim victory during which Aretion was killed and 'Amr ibn al-'As subsequently attempted to convince the native Egyptians to aid the Arabs and surrender the city, based on the kinship between Egyptians and Arabs via Hajar. When the Egyptians refused, the siege resumed until the city fell around the end of March 640.

In July 640, during the siege of Babylon fortress in Egypt against the Byzantine forces, Amr wrote to Umar to ask for reinforcements. The caliph then sent 'Ubadah with 4,000 reinforcements. Thus in his letter, Umar wrote as following:

I have sent you a reinforcements [sic] of 8.000 warriors. It consist of 4,000 mens [sic], each of 1,000 was led by four figures wherein each of these men strength are equal to 1,000 soldiers mens [sic]

Those 4 commanders were two veteran Muhajireen, Zubayr ibn al-Awwam and Miqdad ibn Aswad; a young Ansari commander named Maslama ibn Mukhallad al-Ansari; and veteran Ansari Ubadah ibn al-Samit. However, Baladhuri, Ibn al-Athir and Ibn Sa'd recorded that the four commander were consisted purely Qurayshite consisting Zubayr, Busr ibn Abi Artat, Umayr ibn Wahb, and Kharija ibn Hudhafa. (Note: Regardless the version, Claude Cahen remarked, that this reinforcements army does not included any chieftains or tribes that rebelled during Ridda Wars, which means this army purely consisted of those who proven loyal from the beginning of Caliphate) There are differing opinions regarding the number of soldiers which Zubayr brought: some said it numbered 8,000 (4 commanders leading 8,000), others only 4,000 (4 commanders leading 4,000). Military historian Khalid Mahmud supports the view that the force with Zubayr numbered 4,000 fighters, as it is similar to the number of soldiers in previous reinforcements at the battles of the Yarmuk, al-Qadisiyyah and later to the battle of Nahavand. The second reason was the abrupt request for aid from Egypt only allowed for a small number of soldiers. These reinforcements arrived at Babylon sometime in September 640. Imam Awza'i, a Tabi'un and founder of now extinct Awza'i school Madhhab, also recorded that he witnessed the Muslim conquest of Egypt and he confirmed that 'Ubadah was among those who were sent to aid Amr.

As they arrived in Egypt, Zubayr immediately helped the Rashidun army capture the city of Faiyum. After the fall of Faiyum, Zubayr march to Ain Shams to assist 'Amr in besieging the Byzantine fortress at Heliopolis, which had been besieged before by 'Amr unsuccessfully for months. At Heliopolis Zubayr helped repel a surprise Byzantine counterattack at night against the Rashidun forces. The Byzantines eventually surrendered and the prefect of the city Al-Muqawqis, agreed to pay 50,000 gold coins.

The Muslim army reached Heliopolis, 15 km (10 mi) from Babylon, in July 640. The city boasted the Sun Temple of the Pharaohs and grandiose monuments and learning institutions. Amr ibn al-Aas decided to take the Byzantine to battle on the open field near Heliopolis in early to mid July 640. There was the danger that forces from Heliopolis could attack the Muslims from the flank while they were engaged with the Roman army at Babylon. There was a cavalry clash near the current neighbourhood of Abbaseya. Then as Zubayr has come to Heliopolis along with Busr, Umayr, and Kharija, they wait in the camp until night as Amr still negotiating with the prefect of the city, Al-Muqawqis. However, during that night, the Byzantine Exarchate forces under commander named Arthabun (Aretion or Arteon in Latin), mounted surprise assault to the Rashidun camps. Nevertheless, Ibn Kathir has recorded in his book the night assault by the Exarchate forces were repelled by the Muslim (Zubayr) forces, while half of them were killed by the Muslims. Tomorrow at morning, Amr and Zubayr marched towards the Ain Shams city as they knew the Byzantine forces choose to fight. Then they besiege the city, until Zubayr managed to climb the wall and the Rashidun forces has managed to subdue the city by force. Muqawqis finally agreed to surrender his city and paying 50,000 gold coins. The surrendering treaty by Heliopolis were ratified by Amr which witnessed by Zubayr and two of his sons, Abdullah and Muhammad. The defeated Byzantine soldiers retreated to either the Babylon Fortress or the fortress of Nikiû. The 8,000 al-Aas soldiers were led by Zubayr, Ubadah, Maslama, Miqdad, Busr ibn Abi Artat and defeated the 20,000 strong Byzantine army under Theodore. Zubayr and some of his handpicked soldiers scaled the Heliopolis city wall at an unguarded point and, after overpowering the guards, opened the gates for the army to enter the city. After the capture of Heliopolis, 'Amr and Zubayr returned to Babylon.

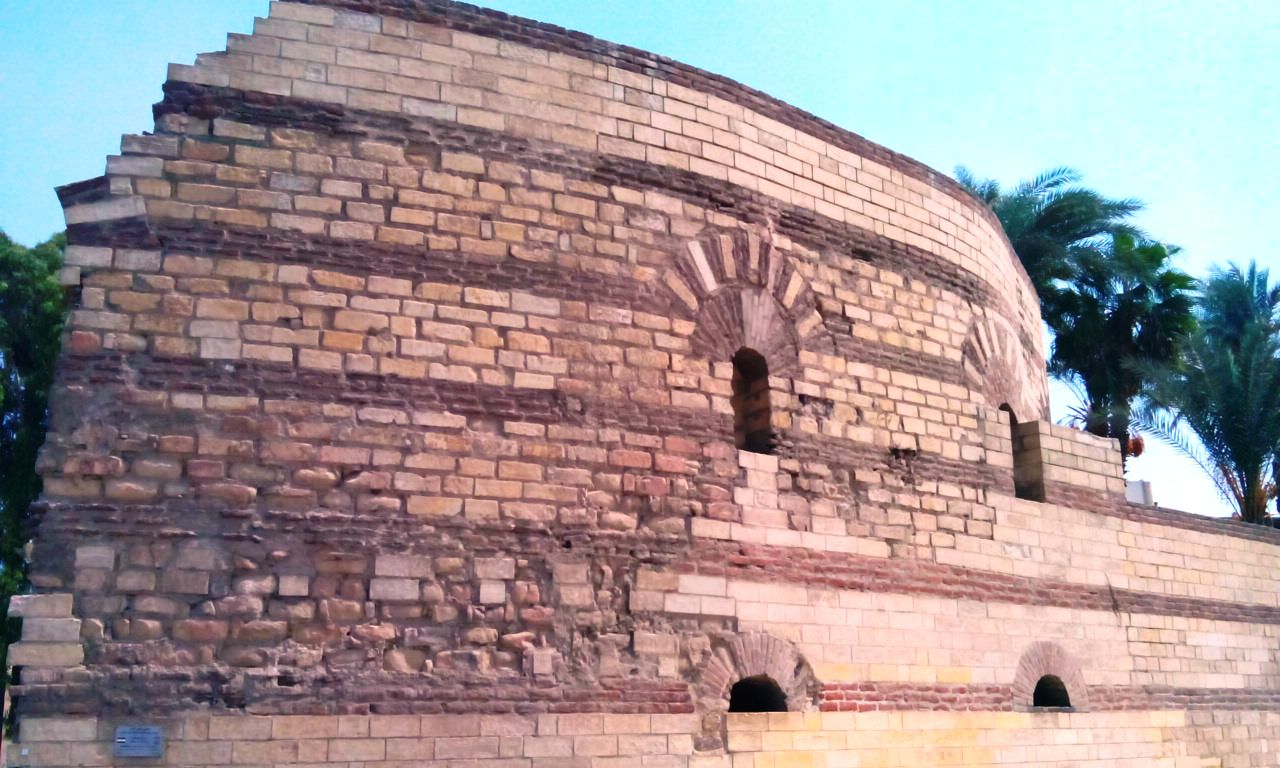
Babylon fortress wall, Egypt

Later, during the Siege of Babylon Fortress, both sides exchanged envoys in an effort to demoralize each other. In the days leading up to the end of the siege, Ubadah was sent to give a delegation to Muqawqis to negotiate for the last time. It is said that Muqawqis became afraid of Ubadah when he saw the Rashidun commander's majestic appearance, prompting Ubadah to taunt Muqawqis reaction in written chronicle:

Truly there are 1000 of my comrades behind me. They are peoples who have darker skin than me and more sinister than me. if you saw them you would be more scared than you see me. I was appointed (as the leader) and my youth had passed. and praise be to Allah. You know, I'm not afraid if 100 of your people face me alone at once. so are my comrades behind me

Ubadah gave him three options: accept Islam, pay Jizyah, or fight it out in accordance with al-Aas' instruction, as Muqawqis later refused the two first options and choose to continue fighting Following the failed negotiation, the Byzantine forces decided to fight, and on the same day the fortress fell to the Muslims led commander Zubayr ibn al-Awwam who climbed the fortress wall personally, leading a small units and opened the gate from inside. As Zubayr prepared to storm the castle with his small units, he chose some of warriors including Muhammad ibn Maslamah to form a small team who would accompany Zubayr in his daring act of personally climbing the wall of Babylon Fortress and forcing their way towards the gate and open it for Muslim army. Islamic medieval chronicler, Qatada ibn Di'ama, reported Zubayr reported as personally leading his soldiers climbed the wall of the fortress through the side where a market called al-Hammam located, then instructed his troops to shout Takbeer the moment he reached the top of the wall. (Note: Baladhuri said al-Zubayr climbed the Babylon fortress wall alone. while other sources said he climbed it with a handful soldiers) Zubayr was recorded to immediately descending the wall and opened the gates with his hand, which caused the entire Muslim army enter, prompting the terrified Muqawqis to surrender (Note: The entire narrations found in Qatadah work, Futuh as-Sham wa Misr, page 209, 227) while in Tabari version, it is the Byzantine garrisons who opened the gate, as they immediately surrender after witnessed az-Zubayr managed to climb the fortress wall. After the fortress has been taken, al-Aas consulted with Maslama ibn Mukhallad al-Ansari. Maslama suggested to Amr to give a field command to Ubadah to attack Alexandria. Ubadah rode to Amr, who gave him his spear of command.

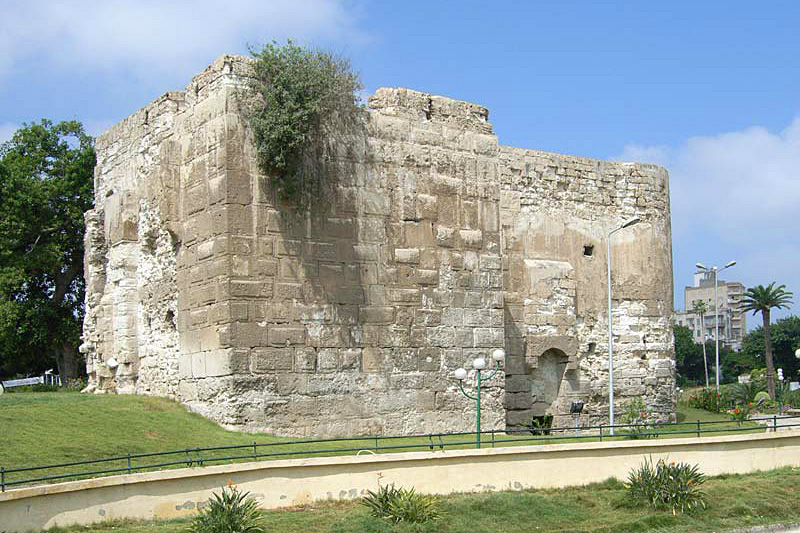
Western tower, remains of the Hellenistic and Islamic city wall fortifications, Alexandria, Egypt

Later, Ubadah gave a speech before marched towards Alexandria. Then as they arrived outside the city, Ubadah led a detachment to besiege Alexandria on the same day and reused his strategy of using trenches strategy to conquer Latakia in Syria, where he gave a signal to the entire army including those who hid in the trenches to launch an assault, where his strategy successfully breached and routed the Alexandrian garrison forces on the very first charge. Thousands of Byzantine soldiers were killed or taken captive, and others managed to flee to Constantinople on ships that had been anchored in the port. Some wealthy traders also left. Ibn Abd al-Hakam noted through his long narrations, that az-Zubayr skipped the siege of Alexandria, as the siege were done by 'Ubadah ibn al-Samit. (Note: According to Mahmoud Sheet Khattab, az-Zubayr recalling his memory regarding Yarmuk and Nahavand when he climbed the wall of the fortress of Babylon with 6 of Muslim soldiers: "I commit myself... (to the battle of) Yarmouk, the decisive gates of the land of Levant, and the decisive battle of Nahawand.... the gates of Persia for the Muslim...")

Meanwhile, Miqdad ibn al-Aswad campaign pacified several areas in al-Gharbia region, started from Kafr Tanah (area in modern-day Dakahlia Governorate), and Tennis. Then Miqdad continued his march leading forty horsemens which included Dhiraar ibn al-Azwar. Then as they reached Damietta, Miqdad found the city was fortified by a man named al-Hammuk, an uncle of Al-Muqawqis. Al-Hammuk fortified the city and closed the gates, as Miqdad besieged the city. As Damietta subdued, Miqdad were appointed to govern the city. The siege continued until the defender of Damietta, Shata, the son of Hammuk, agreed to surrender and converted to Islam. (Note: According to one account, the army which brought by Miqdad to capture Damietta and lake Burullus were amounted 80,000 personnels.) As Shata has now converted to Islam, Miqdad now appointed him to lead the army to conquer the province of Sah, the fortresses in Ashmoun, Lake Burullus, and Dumayra. However, Shata later fallen in battle during the capture of Tina castle.

=== Conquest of northern Sudan ===
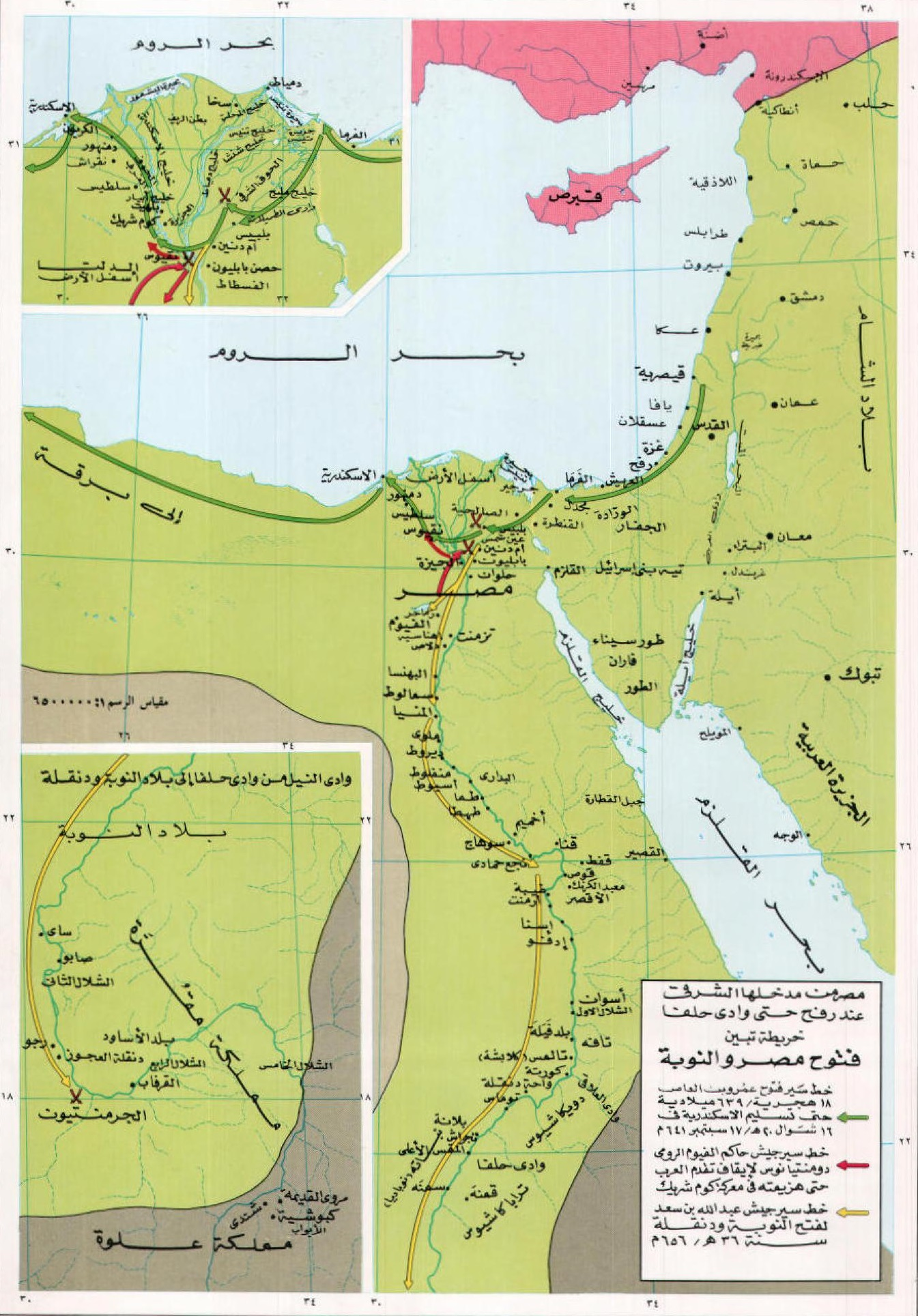
Map showing the path of the Islamic armies and their conquest of Egypt and Nubia during the reign of the second Caliph Omar Ibn Al-Khattab.

Later, the caliphate army on Egypt moved south to face the Exarchate of Africa army which reinforced Sudanese Christian auxiliaries of Beja. (Note: The compilation records about the conquest of Sudan and southern Egypt were compiled in Futuhat Bahnasa and records of al-Maqrizi) Before the battle, the Rashidun army camped in a place which called Dashur. Benjamin Hendrickx reported that the African Christians has mustered around 20,000 Sudanese symmachoi corps, (Note: Symmachos were a successor of Foederati auxiliary troops in Roman empire that existed around 400-650 AD. In this case, they consisted of native black Sudanese auxiliary units of Byzantine.) 1,300 elephants mounted archers, and anti cavalry units named al-Quwwad which armed with iron sticks,which led by a Patrician named Batlus. Meanwhile, al-Maqqari even stated 50,000 Christian army of Byzantine Sudanese Christian alliance in the "Battle of Darishkur". Al-Maqrizi stated in this conflict that Miqdad ibn Aswad, Zubayr ibn al-Awwam, Dhiraar ibn al-Azwar and Uqba ibn Amir each commanding Muslims cavalry facing the Elephant corps led by Byzantine exarchate commander named Batlus. The Rashidun cavalry armed with spears ignited in flames that tip soaked in Santonin plants and Sulphur which caused the elephants flee in terror, scared with the flaming spears. while the elephant riders were toppled from the elephant's back and crushed underfoot on the ground. Meanwhile, the al-Quwwad warriors who used iron staffs were routed by the Rashidun cavalry soldiers who used a seized chain weapons to disarm the staff weapons of the al-Quwwad corps of Byzantine.

Later, the Rashidun army continued to invade and besiege the city Bahnasa, as the enemy now retreated to the city and were reinforced by an arrival of 50,000 according to the report of al-Maqqari. The siege dragged for months, until Khalid ibn al Walid commanded Zubayr ibn al-Awwam, Dhiraar ibn al-Azwar and other commanders to intensify the siege and assign them to lead around 10,000 Companions of the Prophet, with 70 among them were veterans of battle of Badr. They besiege the city for 4 months as Dhiraar leading 200 horsemens, while Zubayr ibn Al-Awwam lead 300 horsemen, while the other commanders such as Miqdad, Abdullah ibn Umar and Uqba ibn Amir al-Juhani leading similar number with Dhiraar with each command 200 horsemens. After Bahnasa finally subdued, where they camped in a village which later renamed as Qays village, in honor of Qays ibn Harith, the overall commander of these Rashidun cavalry. The Byzantines and their Copt allies showering the Rashidun army with arrows and stones from the city wall, As the bitter fights has rages on as casualties increases, (Note: Waqidi recorded that around 5,000 Sahabah were fallen during this battle.) until the Rashidun overcame the defenders, as Dhiraar, the first emerge, came out from the battle with his entire body stained in blood, while confessed he has slayed about 160 Byzantine soldiers during the battle. Chroniclers recorded the Rashidun army has finally breached the city gate under either Khalid ibn al-Walid or Qays ibn Harith finally managed to breach the gate and storming the city and forcing surrender to the inhabitant. (Note: The first version narrated the siege of Bahnasa were led by Khalid ibn al-Walid, who also brought an ex Sassanid Marzban and his 2,000 Persian convert soldiers in this campaign. The Persian Marzban suggested to Khalid to form a suicide squad who will carry a wooden box filled with mixture of sulphur and oil and placing it at the gates, ignited it and blasting the gates(or melting the iron gate, according to the original translation), allowing the Muslim army to enter the city.) (Note: The second version were the Muslim army led by Qays ibn Harith without much details of how the Muslims managed to subdue the city. However, this source mention that Qays ibn Harith name were used temporarily to rename Oxyrhynchus for while to honor his deeds in this campaign, before being renamed to be al-Bahnasa.)

As now the city has captured, Oxyrynchus were renamed as "Al-Qays town", by Maqrizi or "town of Martyrs" in honor to one of the Muslim commander that participated in the conquest of Oxyrynchus. Ali Pasha Mubarak mentioned it in the compromise plans that it was a city that had great fame and its flat was about 1000 acres and the golden curtains were working and the length of the curtains was 30 cubits and its territory included 120 villages other than the plantations and the hamlets. The northern is Kandous, the western is the mountain, the tribal is Touma, and the eastern is the sea. Each gate had three towers, and there were forty ribats, palaces, and many mosques, and at its western end there is a famous place known as the "Dome of Seven maidens".

=== Conquest of the north Africa ===
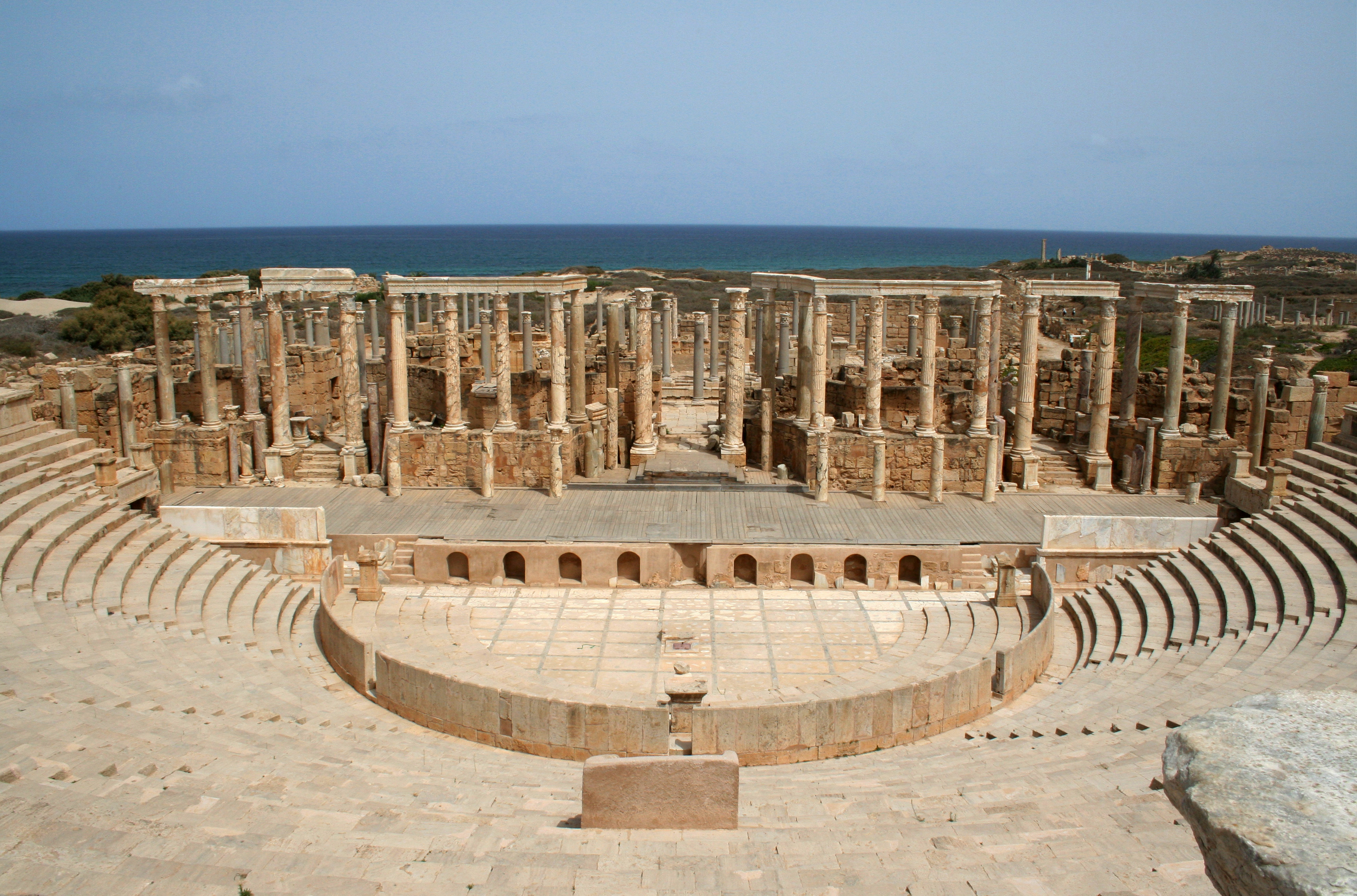
Roman Theatre at Leptis Magna

By 642 AD, under Caliph Umar, Arab Muslim forces had laid control of Mesopotamia (638 AD), Syria (641 AD), Egypt (642 AD), and had invaded Armenia (642 AD), all territories previously split between the warring Byzantine and Sasanian empires, and were concluding their conquest of the Persian Empire with their defeat of the Persian army at the Battle of Nahāvand.

It is recorded by Ibn Abd al-Hakam that during the siege of Tripoli by Amr ibn al-As, seven of his soldiers from the clan of Madhlij, sub branch of Kinana, unintentionally found a section on the western side of Tripoli beach that was not walled during their hunting routine. These seven soldiers managed to infiltrate the city through this way without being detected by the city guards, and then managed to incite riots within the city while shouting Takbir, causing the confused Byzantine garrison soldiers to think the Muslim forces were already inside in the city and to flee towards their ship leaving Tripoli, thus, allowing Amr to march his troops to enter and subdue the city easily.

Later, the Muslim forces besieged Barqa (Cyrenaica) for about three years to no avail. Then Khalid ibn al-Walid, who previously involved in the conquest of Oxyrhynchus, offered a radical plan to erect catapult which filled by cotton sacks. Then as the night came and the city guard slept, Khalid ordered his best warriors such as Zubayr ibn al-Awwam, his son Abdullah, Abdul-Rahman ibn Abi Bakr, Fadl ibn Abbas, Abu Mas'ud al-Badri, and Abd al-Razzaq to step into the catapult platform which filled by cotton sacks. The catapult launched them one by one to the top of the wall and allowed these warriors to enter the city, opening the gates and killing the guards, thus allowing the Muslim forces to enter and capturing the city. Then caliph Umar, whose armies were already engaged in conquering the Sassanid Empire, did not want to commit his forces further in North Africa while Muslim rule in Egypt was still insecure and ordered 'Amr to consolidate the Muslims' position in Egypt and that there should be no further campaigning. 'Amr obeyed, abandoning Tripoli and Burqa and returning to Fustat towards the close of 643.

== Dismissal of Khalid from army ==
In late 638, following Khalid's invasion of Byzantine Armenia in eastern Anatolia, he was dismissed from the army by Umar. The exact reason is unknown, but various scholars have argued that Khalid's dismissal at the zenith of his career was due to the fact that Muslims started having faith in Khalid's command rather than God for being victorious which worried Umar, who saw this as a threat to religious believes of Muslims which says only to rely on God. Also, a poet wrote some poetry on Khalid's bravery and Khalid being impressed, gave him some award.

When Umer learned about it, he called Khalid and said,

"If you have given him money from bait Ul maal, then its corruption and if you have given him your own wealth, then it is wasteful expenditure which is a sin. In both cases, you are dismissed from your rank.

Khalid, on his return from an expedition of Amida and Edessa was charged for embezzlement and thus was dismissed from army. Khalid's removal created a strong wrath among the people on the ground that Khalid, a national hero was mistreated by the Caliph and it was unjust to remove him from the army. In addition to this some supporters of Khalid embolden him to rebel against Umar's discriminatory decision but Khalid, though more than able to rebel chose to accept the decision. On his dismissal, Khalid did not say a single word and accepted the decision of Caliph by heart. After that Khalid fought all battles of his life as a soldier. Had Khalid revolted a bloody civil war would be inevitable. Khalid visited Madinah and met Umar who is reported to have given Khalid a prestigious tribute saying:

You have achieved what no man did ever before, but verily it was through Allah's help

due to his act of dismissing Khalid, Umar was highly criticized publicly. Umar thus explained his dismissal of Khalid as:

I have not dismissed Khalid because of my anger or because of any dishonesty on his part, but because people glorified him and were misled. I feared that people would rely on him for victory. I want them to know that it is Allah who does all things; and there should be no mischief in the land.

From Madinah Khalid went to Emesa and died after less than 4 years in 642 at the eve of Muslim conquest of Persia. During Hajj of the year 642 Umar decided to reappoint Khalid to the army services, he most probably intended to have Khalid's services for the invasion of mainland Persia, like Caliph Abu Bakr did during his first foreign expedition, the conquest of Iraq by using Khalid as a guaranteed victor for Persian front to boost up moral of Muslims for further such expeditions, his abilities and military prowess could also be used this time as a sure victory moreover his presence could also boost up the morale of Muslim army invading Persia and his formidable reputation as a psychological weapon against Persians. Umar reached Madinah after Hajj only to receive the news of Khalid's death that broke like a storm over Medinah. The women took to the streets, led by the women of the Banu Makhzum (Khalid's tribe), wailing and beating their chests. Though Umar, from very first day had given orders that there would be no wailing for departed Muslims, but in this one case he made an exception.

Umar reportedly said:

Let the women of the Banu Makhzum say what they will about Abu Sulaiman (Khalid), for they do not lie, over the likes of Abu Sulaiman weep those who weep.

Umar is reported to have later regretted over his decision of dismissing Khalid from army, accepting the fact that he (Khalid) was not like as he (Umar) thought of him. On his death bed, Umar is also reported to have wished that beside Abu Ubaidah ibn al-Jarrah, if Khalid would be alive he would have appointed him his successor.

== Conquest of Byzantine territory ==
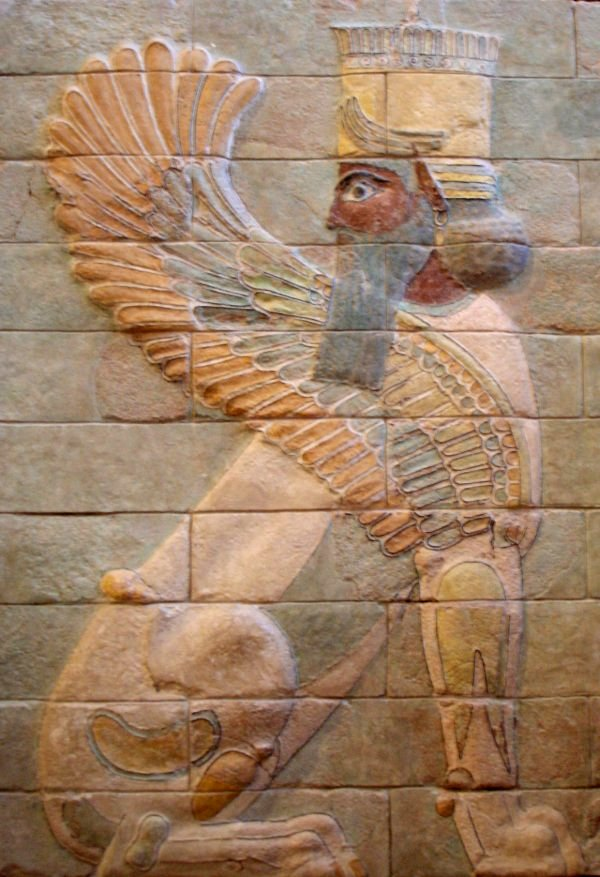
Winged sphinx from the palace of Darius the Great at Susa, captured by Rashidun general Abu Musa in 641.

Abu Bakr became caliph in 632 and triumphed in Ridda wars thus conquering Arabia by early 633. Soon after Ridda wars Abu Bakr started a war of conquest by invading neighboring rich and fertile Iraq, a province of Sassanid Empire where its capital Ctesiphon situated. Muslims under Khalid ibn Walid captured Iraq after decisive Battle of Ullais. In June 634 Khalid was sent by Abu Bakr to Roman front in Syria to command Muslim armies in Syria. Khalid left with half of his army which left Muslim position in Iraq dangerously exposed to Persian counterattack. Misna ibn Haris, Khalid's successor, evacuated Iraq and camped near Arabian Desert after Persian counterattack. Umar soon sent reinforcement, to strengthen the position in Iraq, which was finally defeated in Battle of Bridge in October 635. Emperor Yazdegerd III sought help from his Byzantine counterpart Emperor Heraclius, who married his granddaughter to Yazdegerd III, an old Roman tradition to seal the alliance. Planned to overpower Umar, their common enemy, both emperors started preparations for a massive coordinated counterattack at once on their respected front to crush the threat in Arabia once for good. This alliance resulted in a bloody year of 636 in which Battle of Yarmouk in Syria and Battle of Qadisiyyah in Iraq resulted in decisive Muslim victory.

== Conquest of mainland Persia ==
After the battle Umar changed his policy towards the Sassanid Empire. Yazdegerd III, who unlike his Roman counterpart Heraclius, denied submission to Muslim supremacy in his land, was a constant threat to the Caliphate, and Umar decided to launch a whole scale invasion of Sassanid Persian to eliminate it.

=== Battle of al-Qadisiyah ===
After arriving in Qadisiyyah, Sa'd ibn Abi Waqqas, the supreme commander of Rashidun army in Iraq were joined by Amr ibn Ma'adi Yakrib and Tulayha, who had often been hired by the Quraysh tribe to fight their wars in Pre-Islamic Arabia. Sa'd then sent scouts led by Amr and Tulayha through enemy territory to gather information. After two days of scouting, Amr and Tulayha returned and reported on a massive army of 240,000 Sassanid soldiers moving towards their location. (Note: Most Hadith scholars expressed their skepticism regarding historical narration of Sayf ibn Umar although non narrative historical informations of him was not criticized).

During the fourth day of the battle of Qadisiyyah, Al-Qa`qa' plotted a plan to end the fierce fighting against the Muslims and the Persians; so he suggested his plan towards his superior, al Muthanna ibn Haritha, about leading a special unit to exploit the intensity of the deadlock battle as he will charge and slip onto small gap between Sassanid lines and assassinate Rostam. al-Qa'qa personally choose group of tribal chiefs who were known for strength and valorous, such as Amr ibn Ma'dikarib, Al-Ash'ath ibn Qays, and Ibn Dhul-Bardain for this mission task. As the battle started, al-Qa'qa then execute the plan as he immediately galloped forward with his special units that included Amr on a daring charge to penetrate the surprised Sasanian lines. As the Sassanid soldiers unexpected such maneuver, al-Qa'qa and his units managed to reach the enemy commander, Rostam Farrokhzad. Amr managed to kill one of Rostam's escort and seized his golden bracelets and other brocade coat, while later according to Tabari, Rostam was killed by Amr comrade named Ullafah. At this stage, Ya'qubi has recorded, that Amr, along with Dhiraar ibn al-Azwar, Tulayha, and Kurt ibn Jammah al-Abdi has discovered the corpse of Rostam farrokhzad, the highest commander of Sassanid army during this battle. (Note: There was a dispute among historians whether Hilal or Amr who has claimed the kill of Rostam, While Baladhuri giving the third version that it is Qays ibn Makshuh, Amr nephew, who killed Rostam.) The death of Rostam shocked the entire Sassanid, which prompted Sa'd to instruct general assault to all the Muslim soldiers and ended the four day length battles which resulted the annihilation of Sassanid main forces mustered in Qadisiyyah.

Shortly after Sa'd conquered al-Madain, Umar instructed him not to advance immediately in chasing down the Sassanid forces which fled to the mountains, but instead to stabilize the conquered area first.

After capturing Ctesiphon, the Rashidun army followed by capturing Tikrit and Mosul. Umar wanted Zagros Mountains to be the frontier between Muslims and Persians and is quoted assaying

I wish that between the Suwad and the Persian hills there were walls which would prevent them from getting to us, and prevent us from getting to them. The fertile Suwad is sufficient for us; and I prefer the safety of the Muslims to the spoils of war.

=== Battle of Jalula ===
Sassanid Khuzestan, which invaded during Sa'd tenure in Iraq

Later, as Yazdegerd fled to Hulwan, he immediately gathered his soldiers and followers who were in every territory he came to pass until it mustered into more than 100,000 soldiers and appointed Mihran as the commander of this huge army. According to John Paul C. Nzomiwu, Yazdegerd raised this massive army from Hulwan as he cannot accept the defeat in al-Qadisiyyah. The army of Mihran dug a big ditch around it them as a defense and dwelt in that place with a number of troops, supplies and lots of equipment. to pass Sa'ad immediately sent a letter to Umar about further instruction, which replied by the Caliph for Sa'd to stay in al-Mada'in and appoint Hashim ibn Utbah as the leader of the troops to attack Jalula, Sa'ad immediately executed these instructions and sending Hashim ibn Utbah to lead the Rashidun troopes to engage Mihran forces in the battle of Jalula. Al-Qa'qa were appointed as vanguard, Malik ibn Si'r as right wing, 'Amr ibn Malik on the left, while 'Amr ibn Murrah al-Juhani as rearguard. The said composition of the overall Rashidun troops sent to Jalula numbered 12,000 soldiers, which consisted veteran warriors from Muhajirun and Ansar from the tribal chiefs of the interior Arabs. In this battle alone, it is said that the Muslims also managed to seize spoils in the form of treasures, weapons, gold and silver which amounted to almost as many as the treasures they found in al-Madain, (Note: In the original written Sa'adian text this correction is from Tarikh ath-Thabari, 4/24. See his biography in al-Ishabah, 3/257.) There are also ornaments and silver dishes among the spoils. Meanwhile, Asad Q. Ahmed note it is bigger than spoils in Ctesiphon.

=== Conquest of Khuzestan ===
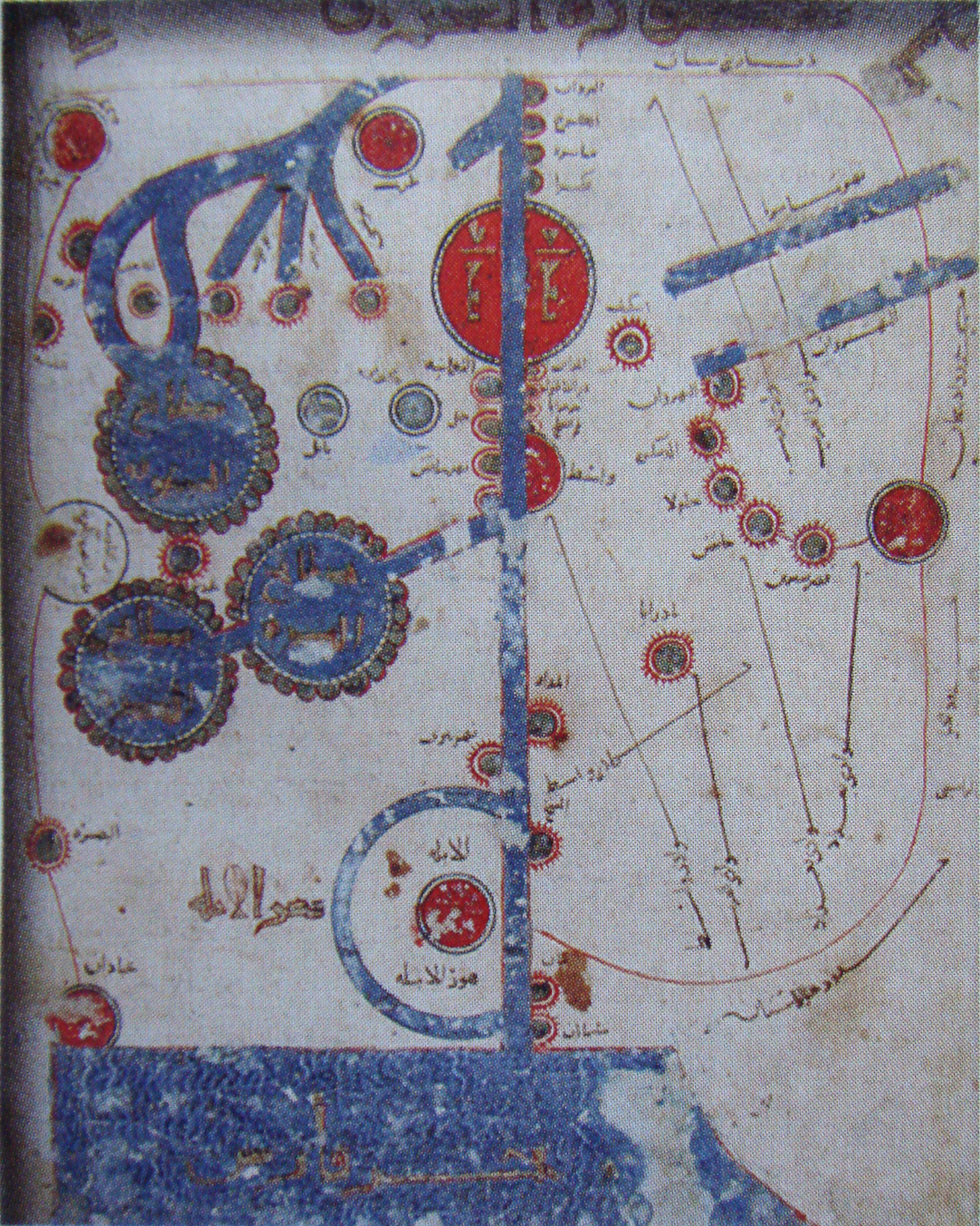
Khuzestan map of al-Istakhri, Abbasid geographer

After the Muslims landed in Basra in Dhul-Hijjah in the year 16 AH, the Islamic army was subjected to Persian raids led by Hormuzan from the city of Ahvaz which bordering Basra. Before his natural death, Utbah send an army which commanded by Arfajah, Hudhaifah bin Muhsin, Mujaza bin Thawr, Husayn ibn Al Qa'qa, Ashim ibn Amr, and Salma ibn Al Qain, who lead in 700 soldiers each. These Basra contingents were further reinforced by garrison of Kufa, governed by Sa'd ibn Abi Waqqas, before the battle against Hormuzan. Before they engage Hormuzan, Arfajah and the Muslim armies marches to the vicinity of the area, to subdue several places including Kashkar, to cut off supply route and reinforcements for the Sassanids in Ahvaz. Arfajah managed to defeat the Hormuzan in this battle and the latter sued for peace.

In 18 AH, Rashidun general named Arfajah began to the conquest of Khuzestan, as they then marching towards Ramhormoz. Arfajah marched on with Al-Bara' ibn Malik, Majza' bin Thawr, and reinforcements from Kufah led by Abu Sabrah ibn Abi Rahm, until they rendezvoused with the forces from Kufa led by Al-Nu'man ibn Muqrin and merged their forces to face Hormuzan. Then they later defeated Hormuzan, who led the Sassanid resistance before in Ahvaz. Hormuzan then flee from Ramhormoz and escape towards Shushtar. Umar giving specific instructed Abu Musa al-Ash'ari, the supreme commander of the Khuzestan conquest, to bringing in one of the caliphate best warrior, Al-Bara' ibn Malik, to the siege of Shushtar. After the lengthy Siege of Shushtar, Hormuzan, supreme commander of Sassanid imperial army are finally taken captive.

After the Siege of Shushtar, Arfajah continued to press deeper of Khuzestan with Abu Musa al-Ash'ari and Al-Nu'man ibn Muqrin capturing Shush, until Arfajah arrived in the great Battle of Nahavand, which result sealed the fate of Sassanid forever as more than 100,000 Sassanid soldiers killed in this battle alone,

In year 25 AH, Arfajah choose a small village near Nineveh in the eastern bank of Tigris to build new garrison city, which later known as city of Haditha Mosul(new Mosul), that in the future will be simply known as city of Haditha. These garrison cities under Arfajah became main headquarters and supply route for the army that were sent to Muslim conquest of Armenia and Muslim conquest of Azerbaijan.

=== Battle of Nahavand ===
On the eve of the battle of Nahāvand, the caliphate heard the Sassanid armed forces from Mah, Qom, Hamadan, Ray, Isfahan, Azerbaijan, and Nahavand has gathered in area of Nahavand to counter the caliphate invasion. Caliph Umar responded by assembling war councils to discuss the strategy to face the Sassanids in Nahavand. As the battle plans has been set, at first the caliph want to lead the army himself, however, Ali urged the caliph to instead delegate the battlefield commands not by himself, but rather to the field commanders, which then agreed by the caliph as he decided to send Amr ibn Ma'adi Yakrib, Zubayr ibn al-Awwam, Tulayha, Abdullah ibn Amr, Al-Ash'ath ibn Qays and others under the command of Al-Nu'man ibn Muqrin as reinforcement to Nahavand. The battle were lasted from Wednesday in the form of intense skirmishes until Thursday as the Sassanid forces refused to leave their position within trenches despite their superior number, until the last day, as Al-Nu'man ibn Muqrin asking the opinion of his commander how to break the Sassanid resistance, as they entrenched themselves behind spiked ditch, Amr opined they should try to force a daring breakthrough maneuver against their lines to break the Sassanid resistances. However, Tulayha opined different strategy to bait them to leave their position to the more open field, which were agreed by the other commanders. Then, as the last day of the battle started, through cunning ploy of Tulayha strategy to bait the bulk of Sassanid forces to chase them as the Rashidun forces pretended to withdraw while peppering the Sassanids with showers of arrows by their cavalry archers. As the Sassanids chasing the withdrawing army of Rashidun, the heavily outnumbered Rashidun army suddenly mounting counterattack from the favorable position and fought hard against the onslaught of more than hundred thousands Sassanid united forces, which not only managed to stop the Sassanid forces on their track, but also struck heavy losses on them and causing the entire Sassanid army collapsed. Nu'aym ibn Muqarrin, the brother of al-Nu'man, depicted the battle rages intensely as he saw Amr ibn Ma'dikarib and Zubayr ibn al-Awwam both fought furiously and full of vigor, while Nu'aym saw the heads of Sassanid soldiers flying around the two warriors "like trees that were uprooted from their roots",. After the battle, the Rashidun army assessed the "immovable booty (Fay) which being shared to all the participants of the battle.

After a devastating defeat at Nihawand, last Sassanid emperor Yazdgerd III, was never to be able again to raise more troops to resist the mighty onslaught of Umar, it had now become a war between two rulers, Umar would follow Yazdgerd III to every corner of his empire either will kill him or will capture him, like he did with Hormuzan. Yazdgerd III would have a narrow escape at Marv when Umar's lieutenant was to capture him after Battle of Oxus river, he would save his life only by fleeing to China, far enough from reach of Umar, thus effectively ending the 400-year-old Sassanid dynasty. On the long-term impact of this battle, Sir Muhammad Iqbal wrote: "If you ask me what is the most important event in the history of Islam, I shall say without any hesitation: "The Conquest of Persia". The battle of Nehawand gave the Arabs not only a beautiful country, but also an ancient civilization; or, more properly, a people who could make a new civilisation with the Semitic and Aryan material. Our Muslim civilisation is a product of the cross-fertilization of the Semitic and the Aryan ideas. It is a child who inherits the softness and refinement of his Aryan mother, and the sterling character of his Semitic father. But for the conquest of Persia, the civilisation of Islam would have been one-sided. The conquest of Persia gave us what the conquest of Greece gave to the Romans."

=== Further conquest of Iran ===
After the battle of Nahavand, Umar sent letter to Nu'aym ibn Muqarrin to march towards Hamadan, with Suwaid ibn Muqarrin leading the vanguard, Rib'i ibn Amir at-Tayy and Muhalhil ibn Zayd at-Tamimi lead the wings. Then the troops marched on chasing the fleeing Sassanid forces towards Hamadan through mountainous road of Thaniyyat al-'Asal. Then as they reached Hamadan, Nu'aym realized the Hamadan has been fortified to resist the Rashidun offensive. Thus Nu'aym started to besiege the Hamadan by entrenching themselves on the roads between Hamadan and Jarmidhan mountains. Nu'aym troops taking all the areas around Hamadan, then as the inhabitant of Hamadan realized they has been surrounded, they sued for peace and offered tribute to Nu'aym as a sign of their submission.

In 642, Umar launched multi-prong expeditions into Persia, first capturing Isfahan province thus cutting off the northern province of Azerbaijan and southern province of Fars from main empire. in the second phase capturing Azerbaijan and fars thus isolating Yazdegerd III's stronghold Khurasan. The third phase further isolated Khurasan by capturing Kirman, Sistan and Makran in south while Persian Armenia in north. Fourth and last phase started in early 644 with the invasion of Khurasan. After a Decisive Battle of Oxus river, Yazdegerd III fled to central Asia and Persian Empire ceased to exist. Umar's conquest of Sassanid Persian empire by commanding the operations, while sitting about 1000 kilometer away from the battle fields, will become the greatest triumph of Umar and his strategic marvel, and marked his reputation as one of the greatest military and political genius of history, like his late cousin Khalid ibn Walid (590–642).

== Red Sea and India ==
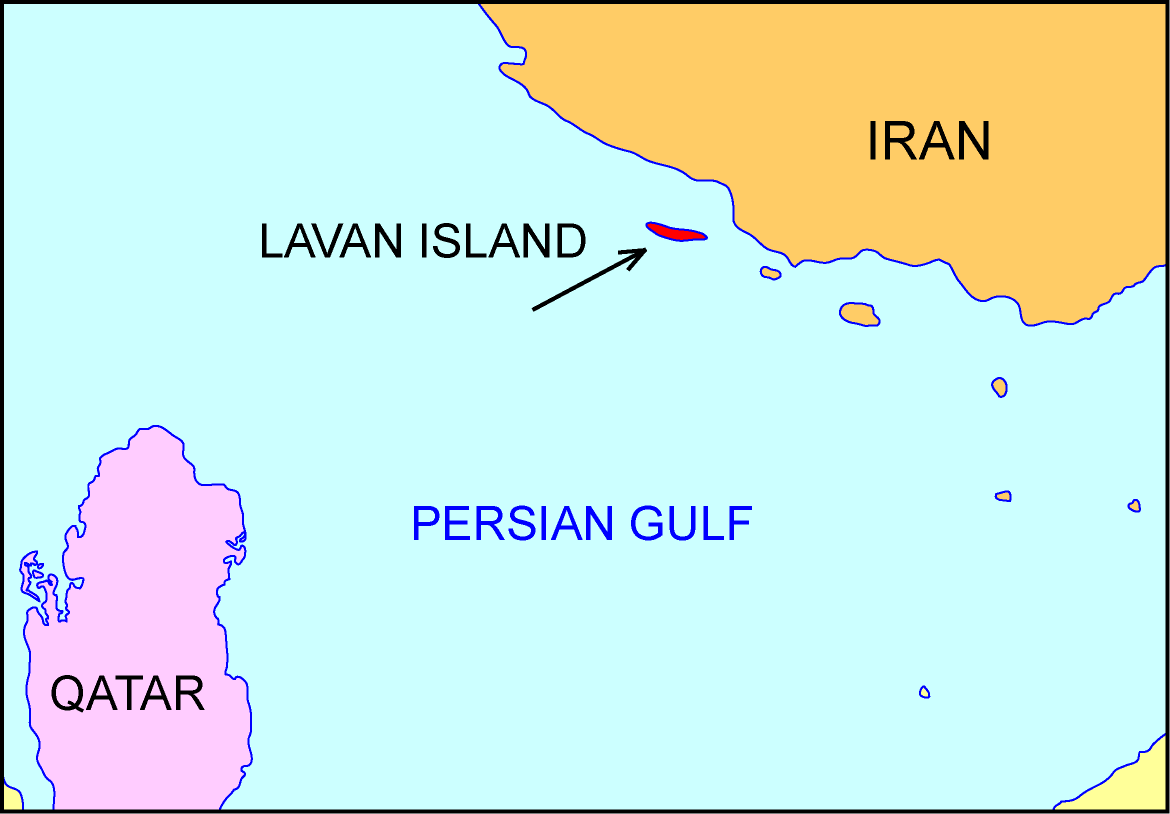
Lavan Island

Before the ascension of Abu Bakar as caliph, Arabs kingdom Bahrain joined the caliphate Al-Ala al-Hadhrami, the ruler of the kingdom who has pledged allegiance to the caliphate along with Arfajah, al-Ala general and the first Muslim Arab naval commander according Mahmoud Sheet Khattab.

In the year 12 AH (633 AD), Arfajah led further naval operation and conquered a large number of islands in the Gulf of Oman. Ahmed Cevdet Pasha, who narrated from the text of Al-Waqidi, pointed that Arfajah did not have trouble to raise an army and ships which needed to mount this naval invasion without the support of central caliphate, due to his notably wealthiness and powerful influence of followers from within his clan. Ahmed Jawdat further narrated that the background of Arfajah naval expedition from Al-Waqidi's book that Arfajah were filled by impetuous Jihad motivation as he launched the expedition without the permission of Umar, boarded the ships and marched for the conquest in the Sea of Oman. However, Cevdet Pasha mistook as he though this campaign occurred during Umar caliphate, while in reality it is occurred during caliphate of Abu Bakr. Tabari narrated that as caliph Abu Bakar learned Arfajah acted without his consent, he immediately dismissed Arfajah from the navy command. Later during the era of Umar, Naval activity of the caliphate continued as 'Alqama crossed the Red Sea toward Abyssinia with permission from Umar. The expedition was disastrous, and only a few ships returned safely to their home port. This accident probably became the reason of the reluctance of 'Umar Ibn al-Khattab to embark such naval adventures again for most time of his reign. Meanwhile, in Bahrain, there constant naval raids by Persians. Arfajah, who just conquered the town of Sawad immediately called back to Bahrain to reinforce al-Ala.

I have provided you with Arfajah ibn Harthamah, and he is a Mujahid and brillant strategist, so if he comes to you, ask his consultation and keep him near (to you)".

Caliph Umar praise Arfajah in his letter to Utbah ibn Ghazwan.

In the end of the year 13 AH (634 AD), al Ala ibn Hadhrami commanded Arfajah started sending ships and boats for further maritime expedition, as they are ordered by caliph Umar to detach himself from Al-Muthanna ibn Haritha while they are in Hirah. This time, Arfajah, under al Ala, were attacking the island of Darin (Qatif) to exterminate the feeling apostate rebels who flee from mainland of Arabian peninsula toward that island. Arfajah led the first Arab-Islamic naval campaign in history against Arab rebels on their own place in the final battle in Island of Darin (Qatif) and Juwathah. The caliphate mariners also facing Persian Sassanid forces in Darin, as contrary to the Sassanian marines in Yemen of the Abna under Fayruz al-Daylami who pledge their allegiance to Abu Bakar and worked harmoniously with the Arabians in Yemen to quell the rebellion, the Sassanid mariners counterparts in Oman and Bahraini refused to submit to the caliphate. In the final battle of Darin island in the fortress of Zarah, the caliphate mariners has finally subdued the final resistance after Arfajah soldier named Al-Bara' ibn Malik manage to kill the Persian Marzban commander, and managed to seize the wealth of the said commander of 30,000 coins after the battle. (Note: According to Baladhuri, 40,000 coin.) However, caliph 'Umar saw that it was too much for single person to acquire spoils of war that huge, so the Caliph decided that al-Bara' should be given a fifth of that spoils instead of whole. (Note: Scholars of Islamic Fiqh jurisprudence take notes that this al-Baraa' incident has become the norm in Sunni jurisprudence on the later era that every single soldier has a right for a fifth of Ghanima or spoils of war, according to his performance deeds in the battlefield.)

After the island were subdued, Arfajah, under instruction from al Ala, started to send ships towards Sassanid coast in Port of Tarout of the island. This continued until Arfajah reached the port of Borazjan, where according to Ibn Sa'd Arfajah sunk many Persian navy ships in this battle, Shuaib Al Arna'ut and al-Arqsoussi recorded the words of Al-Dhahabi regarding Arfaja naval campaign during this occasion: "...Arfaja sent to the coast of Persia, destroying many (enemy) ships, and conquered the island and build mosque..".

It is said by historians this Arfajah operations in the coast of Arabian Gulf secured the water ways for Muslims army and paving the way for the later Muslim conquest of Pars. Ibn Balkhi wrote that Arfajah write his progress to al Ala, who in turn inform to 'Umar. This satisfy 'Umar, who in turn instructed al Ala to further resupply Arfajah who still continued fighting off coast, which Arfajah responds continued the naval campaigns the mainland of Fars. The coastal incursions commenced by Arfajah spans from Jazireh-ye Shif to an Island, which identified by Ahmad ibn Mājid as Lavan Island Then continued to until they reached Kharg Island. Poursharianti recorded this second Arfajah naval adventure were ended with the annexation of Kharg, in month of Safar, 14 AH.

However, this time caliph 'Umar disliked Arfajah unnecessarily dragged sea adventures, as the naval forces of Arfajah were originally dispatched to support Utbah ibn Ghazwan to conquer Ubulla. Shortly, 'Umar instructed to dismiss Arfajah from his command and reassign al-Ala ibn Hadrami as his replacement. although, Donnes said in his version that al-Ala died before he could assume the position. regardless the versions, the caliph then later instructed Arfajah to bring 700 soldiers from Bahrain to immediately reinforce Utbah who is marching towards Al-Ubulla. Arfajah managed to rendezvous with Utbah later in the location that will become a Basra city, and together they besieged Ubulla until they managed to capture the port city.

=== Coastal campaign of Hind ===
The campaign in Hind managed to draw the area Transoxiana from area located in between the Jihun River(Oxus/Amu Darya) and Syr Darya, to Sindh (present day Pakistan). Then Ibn Abu al-Aas dispatched naval expeditions against the remaining ports and positions Sassanids. This naval operation immediately conflicted Hindu kingdoms of Kapisa-Gandhara in modern-day Afghanistan, Zabulistan and Sindh. As Ibn al-Aas delegate the expeditions against Thane and Bharuch toward his brother, Hakam. Another sibling named al-Mughira were given the command to invade Debal. Al-Baladhuri states they were victorious at Debal and Thane, and the Arabs returning to Oman without incurring any fatalities. The raids were launched in late 636c. 636. The contemporary Armenian historian Sebeos confirms these Arab raids against the Sasanian littoral. However, this naval operations were launched without Umar's sanction and he disapproved of them upon learning of the operations.

The Rashidun navy continued pushing as in 639 or 640, Ibn Abu-al-Aas and al-Hakam once again captured and garrisoned Arab troops in the Fars town of Tawwaj near the Persian Gulf coast, southwest of modern Shiraz. while delegate the affair of Bahrain to al-Mughira. In 641 Ibn al-Aas established his permanent fortress at Tawwaj. From Tawwaj in the same year, he captured the city of Reishahr and killed the Sasanian governor of Fars, Shahruk. By 642 Ibn Abu-al-Aas subjugated the cities of Jarreh, Kazerun and al-Nubindjan. until they reached "The Frontier of Al Hind", where now they engaged the first land battle against a ruler of an Indian kingdom named Rutbil, King of Zabulistan. in the Battle of Rasil in 644 AD. According to Baloch, the reasons Uthman ibn Abi al-'As launch this campaign without caliph consent were possibly zeal-driven adventures for the cause of jihad (holy struggle). Meanwhile, George Malagaris opined this expedition have limited aim to protect the sea trade of caliphate from pirates attack.

Nevertheless, this naval campaign towards Hind immediately terminated the moment Uthman ibn al-Affan ascended as caliph, as he immediately instructed the incumbent commanders of the expedition towards Makran, al-Hakam and Abdallah ibn Mu'ammar at-Tamimi, to cease their campaign and withdraw their position from river in Hind.

=== Conflict with Hindu kingdoms ===
Before the Muslim raids, Makran was under the Hindu Rais of Sindh, but the region was also shared by the Zunbils. From an early period, parts of it frequently alternated between Indian and Persian control with the Persian portion in the west and the Indian portion in the east. It was later annexed by the Persians from Rai Sahiras II. It was reconquered by the usurper Chach of Alor in 631. Ten years later, it was described to be "under the government of Persia" by Xuanzang who visited the region. Three years later however, when the Arabs invaded, it was regarded as the "frontier of Al-Hind".

Raja Rasil, a local Hindu potentate of the Kingdom of Sindh, concentrated huge armies in Makran to halt the advance of the Muslims. Suhail was reinforced by Uthman ibn Abi al-'As from Persepolis, and Hakam ibn Amr from Busra. The combined forces defeated Raja Rasil at the Battle of Rasil, who retreated to the eastern bank of River Indus. The Raja's army had included war elephants, but these had posed little problem for the Muslim conquerors, who had dealt with them during the conquest of Persia. In accordance with the orders of Caliph Umar, the captured war elephants were sold in Islamic Persia, with the proceeds distributed among the soldiers as share in booty. The victorious Arab army returned to Persia along with booty and a war elephant. In accordance with the orders of Umar, the captured war elephants were sold in Islamic Persia, with the proceeds distributed among the soldiers as share in booty.

Further east from the Indus River laid Sindh, which was the domain of the Rai Kingdom. Umar, after learning that Sindh was a poor and relatively barren land, disapproved Suhail's proposal to cross the Indus River. For the time being, Umar declared the Indus River, a natural barrier, to be the easternmost frontier of his domain. This campaign came to an end in mid-644. The same year, in 644, Umar had already rejected the proposal by Ahnaf ibn Qais, conqueror of Khurasan, of crossing Oxus river in the north to invade Central Asia.

== See also ==
Military campaigns under Caliph Uthman
