= Rashidun conquests under Uthman =

Muslim conquests under Uthman, 644–656

- 644–656
Rashidun conquests under Umar	First Fitna
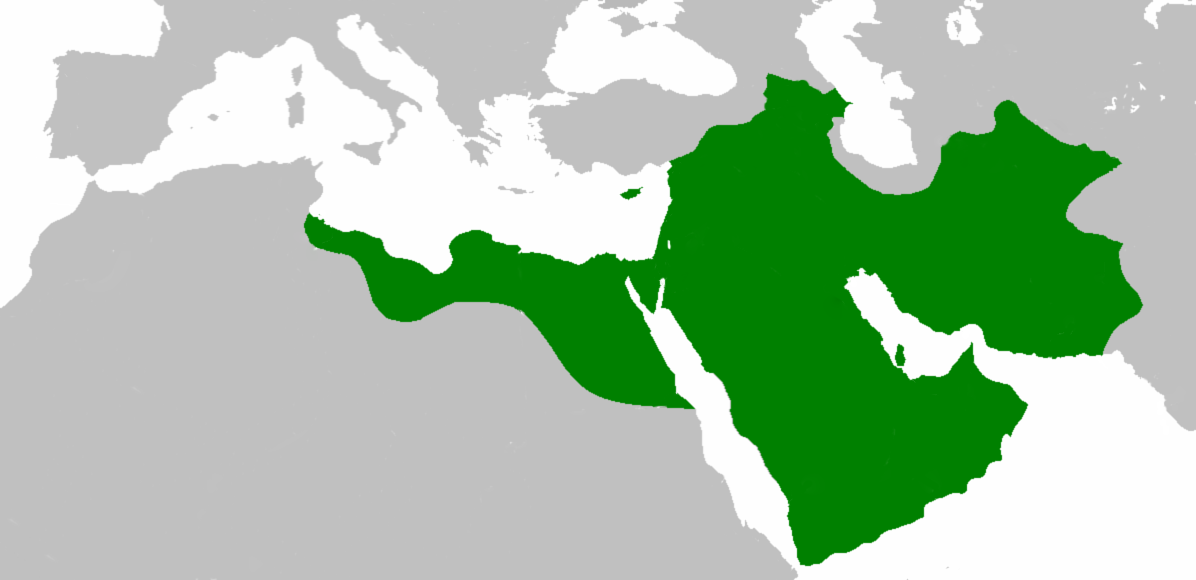
- Rashidun Caliphate under Uthman ibn Affan in 654.
- Location: Rashidun Caliphate
- Monarch: Uthman
- Key events: Conquest of Mesir; Conquest of Armenia; Conquest of Persia; Conquest of Cyprus; Battle of the Masts; Persian revolts against the Rashidun Caliphate

The third Rashidun caliph, Uthman ibn Affan (r. 644–656) continued the policy of military expansion carried out by his predecessors, Umar and Abu Bakr. During his reign, the caliphate stretched from Tripolitania, Egypt, and Anatolia to Khorasan and Sindh and reached its greatest extent in 654 CE. However, these conquests were halted when a rebellion began in Egypt which led to his assassination, and began the first Fitna.

== Background ==
=== Byzantine attempt to re-capture Egypt ===
With the death of Umar and the disposal of 'Amr ibn al-'As from the governorship of Egypt, the Byzantines seized Alexandria, thinking it to be the right time to take action. Uthman again sent 'Amr ibn al-'As to defend Egypt and made him governor and commander-in-chief of Egypt. Amr defeated the Byzantine forces in the Battle of Nikiou, a few hundred miles from Fustat. After the defeat of the Byzantine army at Naqyus the Rashidun army laid siege to Alexandria, which fell when a Copt opened the gates of city one night, in return for amnesty.

After re-conquering Alexandria, 'Amr ibn al-'As ordered the demolition of the walls of the city to obstruct any future invasion by Byzantine forces. Amr was again dismissed from his post due to his loose financial administration

== Campaigns ==
=== Conquest of North Africa ===
After the withdrawal of the Byzantines from Egypt, North Africa which was Byzantine Exarchate of Africa had declared its independence under its king, Gregory the Patrician. The dominions of Gregory extended from the borders of Egypt to Morocco. Abdullah ibn Saad would send raiding parties to the west and as a result of these raids the Muslims got considerable treasure. The success of these raids made Abdullah ibn Saad feel that a regular campaign should be undertaken for the conquest of North Africa.

Uthman gave him permission after considering it in Majlis al Shura and a force of 10,000 soldiers was sent as reinforcements. The army assembled at Barqah in Cyrenaica, and in 647 from there they marched west to capture Tripoli, after Tripoli they marched to Sbeitla, the capital of King Gregory. Gregory was defeated and killed in the battle due to the tactics used by Abd-Allah ibn al-Zubayr. After the battle of Sufetula the people of North Africa sued for peace and they agreed to pay an annual tribute. The Arabs had sacked Sufetula and raided across the Exarchate, while the Byzantines withdrew to their fortresses. Unable to storm the Byzantine fortifications, and satisfied with the huge amounts of plunder they had made, the Arabs agreed to depart in exchange for the payment of a heavy tribute in gold. Instead of annexing North Africa, the Muslims preferred to make it a vassal state and when the stipulated amount of the tribute was paid, the army withdrew to Barqah.

=== First Muslim invasion of Iberian Peninsula ===
According to many books of Islamic history, the conquest of the Spanish section of the Iberian Peninsula is attributed to Tariq ibn-Ziyad and Musa bin Nusair in 711 – 712, in the time of the Umayyad Caliph, al-Walid I (Walid ibn Abd al-Malik). However, according to Muslim historian Muhammad ibn Jarir al-Tabari, Spain was first invaded some sixty years earlier during the caliphate of Uthman. Other prominent Muslim historians like, Ibn Kathir, have also quoted the same narration.

According to the account of al-Tabari, when North Africa had been duly conquered by Abdullah ibn Saad, two of his generals, Abdullah ibn Nafi ibn Husain, and Abdullah ibn Nafi' ibn Abdul Qais, were commissioned to invade the coastal areas of Spain by sea. On this occasion Uthman is reported to have addressed a letter to the invading force. In the course of the letter, Uthman said:

Constantinople will be conquered from the side of Al-Andalus. Thus if you conquer it you will have the honour of taking the first step towards the conquest of Constantinople. You will have your reward in this behalf both in this world and the next.

No details of the campaigns in Spain during the caliphate of Uthman are given by Muhammad ibn Jarir al-Tabari or by any other historian. The account of al-Tabari is merely to the effect, that an Arab force aided by a Berber force landed in Spain, and succeeded in conquering the coastal areas of Al-Andalus. We do not know where the Muslim force landed, what resistance they met, and what parts of Spain they actually conquered. Anyhow, it is clear that the Muslims did conquer some parts of Spain during the caliphate of Uthman. Presumably the Muslims established some colonies on the coast of Spain. There are reasons to presume that these Muslims entered into trade relations with the rest of Spain and other parts of Europe. The areas were lost shortly after because of the general disorder in the empire.

=== Campaign against Nubia ===
A failed campaign was undertaken against Nubia during the Caliphate of Umar in 642 at the first battle of Dongola. This was the Arabs' first real defeat on the battlefield despite outnumbering their opponents. The war ultimately ended in a baqt treaty, after the second battle of Dongola

Location of Dongola within Sudan

Ten years later in 652, Uthman's governor of Egypt, Abdullah ibn Saad, sent another army to Nubia. This army penetrated deeper into Nubia and laid siege to the Nubian capital of Dongola. The Muslims demolished the cathedral in the center of the city. The Arabs retreated because of the Nubian archers who let loose a shower of arrows aimed at the eyes of the Muslim warriors. As the Muslims were not able to overpower the Nubians, they accepted the offer of peace from the Nubian king. According to the treaty that was signed, each side agreed not to make any aggressive moves against the other. Each side agreed to afford free passage to the other party through its territories. Nubia agreed to provide 360 slaves to Egypt every year.

=== Conquest of the islands of Mediterranean Sea ===
During Umar's reign, the governor of Syria, Muawiyah I, sent a request to build a naval force to invade the islands in the Mediterranean Sea but Umar rejected the proposal because of risk of death of soldiers at sea. During his reign Uthman gave Muawiyah permission to build a navy after concerning the matter closely. The Muslim force landed on Cyprus in 649. There was only a small Byzantine garrison on the island, which was overpowered without any difficulty. The islanders submitted to the Muslims, and agreed to pay a tribute of 7,000 dinars per year. The conquest of Cyprus was the first naval conquest of the Muslims. After Cyprus, the Muslim naval fleet headed towards the island of Crete and then Rhodes and conquered them without much resistance. In 652–654, the Muslims launched a naval campaign against Sicily and they succeeded in capturing a large part of the island. Soon after this Uthman was murdered, no further expansion was made, and the Muslims accordingly retreated from Sicily. In 655 Byzantine emperor Constans II led a fleet in person to attack the Muslims at Phoiníkē (off Lycia) but it was defeated: 500 Byzantine ships were destroyed in the battle, and the emperor himself risked being killed.

=== Byzantine attempt to re-conquer Syria ===
After the death of Umar, the Byzantine emperor, Constantine III, decided to re-capture the Levant, which had been lost to the Muslims during Umar's reign. A full-scale invasion was planned and a force of 80,000 soldiers was sent to re-conquer Syria. Muawiyah, the governor of Syria, called for reinforcements and Uthman ordered the governor of Kufa to send a contingent, which together with the Syrians defeated the Byzantine army.

=== Re-Conquest of Armenia and Georgia ===
Armenia and Georgia were conquered during the reign of Umar. Initial raids took place under the command of Khalid ibn al-Walid and Ayadh bin Ghanim. Later Habib ibn Muslaimah was sent for a full-scale invasion up to the Black Sea. During Uthman's reign, a revolt broke out, and Uthman commissioned Habib ibn Muslaimah to reassert their control over Armenia and Georgia. The whole of the region was re-conquered. There was not much fighting, and on the approach of the Muslim armies, the Armenians laid down arms, and accepted the usual terms of the payment of Jizya (tribute). Armenia, Georgia and Azerbaijan were made one province under the name Azerbaijan; Ashat ibn Qais was the last governor of this province during Uthman's reign.

=== Occupation of Anatolia ===
The Byzantine forts in the region of Tarsus were conquered during Umar's reign, soon after the Conquest of Antioch, by Khalid ibn al-Walid and Abu Ubaidah ibn al-Jarrah. During Uthman's reign the region was recaptured by Byzantine forces and a series of campaigns were launched to regain control of the region. In 647 Muawiyah the governor of Syria sent an expedition against the Anatolia, they entered in Cappadocia, and sacked Caesarea Mazaca. In 648 the Rashidun army raided into Phrygia. A major offensive into Cilicia and Isauria in 650–651 forced the Byzantine emperor Constans II to enter into negotiations with Caliph Uthman's governor of Syria, Muawiyah. The truce that followed allowed a short respite, and made it possible for Constans II to hold on to the western portions of Armenia. In 654–655 on the orders of Caliph Uthman, an expedition was preparing to attack the Byzantine capital Constantinople but did not carry out the plan due to the civil war that broke out in 656. The Taurus Mountains in Turkey marked the westernmost frontiers of Rashidun Caliphate in Anatolia during Caliph Uthman's reign.

=== Re-conquest of Fars ===
The province of Fars in Persia was conquered by the Muslims during the Caliphate of Umar. In Uthman's reign, like other provinces of Persia, Fars also broke into revolt. Uthman directed Abdullah ibn Aamir, the Governor of Basra, to take immediate steps to retrieve the situation. Accordingly, he marched with a large force to Persepolis; the city surrendered and agreed to pay tribute. From here the army marched to Al j bard, where, after a brief resistance, the Muslims captured the city, and the citizens agreed to pay tribute. Thereafter the Muslim force advanced to Jor. The Persians gave battle but they were defeated and the city was captured by the Muslims. Peace was made with the usual terms, the payment of Jizya. While the army was still in Jor, Persepolis again broke into revolt; Abdullah ibn Aamir then took his forces to Persepolis and laid siege to the city. After a violent battle the Muslims were able to regain control of the city once again. All of the leaders among the Persians who were involved in instigating the revolt were hunted down and executed. With the fall of Persepolis, other cities in Fars also submitted unconditionally. Thus the Muslims once again became the masters of Fars. Uthman's appointed governor of Fars, after analyzing the situation, sent Islamic missionaries to various cities of the region to convert the people to Islam to avert future revolts. A large number of people embraced Islam.

=== Re-conquest of Sistan ===
In the 7th century, the Persian Empire's province of Sistan extended from the modern day Iranian province of Sistan to central Afghanistan and the Balochistan province of Pakistan.

Sistan was captured during the reign of Umar, and like other provinces of the Persian Empire, it also broke into revolt during Uthman's reign in 649. Uthman directed the governor of Bosra, Abdullah ibn Aamir to re-conquer the Persian province of Sistan. A column was sent to Sistan under the command of Rabiah ibn Ziyad. The first confrontation took place at Zaliq, a border town, during a Persian festival and with the Muslims victorious, the citizens asked for peace. It is said that the Muslim commander, Rabiah ibn Ziyad, stuck a pole in the ground and asked the Persians to pile gold and silver up to the top. Once it was done the Muslims left the citizens in peace.

Qarquqya, five miles from Zaliq was captured without resistance. After that the army marched to Zaranj, in modern-day south western Afghanistan. After a long siege, Zaranj finally surrendered with the usual terms of Jizya. Thereafter the Muslims marched northward into Afghanistan to subjugate the rest of the province, and the city of Qarbatin was conquered after a battle. Rabiah returned to Zaranj with a large amount of treasure and captives. Rabiah remained the governor of Sistan for two years, then he left for Bosra. As soon as he left the province of Sistan, it broke into revolt once again and expelled Rabiah's successor.

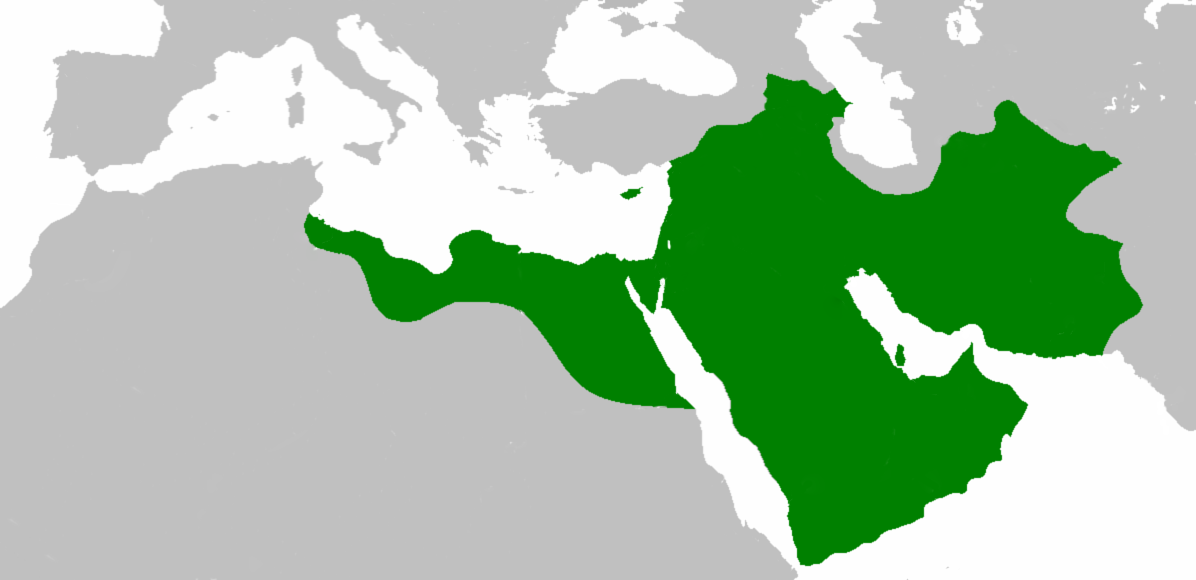
Empire of the Rāshidūn Caliphate at its peak under the third rāshidūn caliph ʿUthmān (654 CE) Strongholds of the Rāshidūn Caliphate

This time after obtaining the approval of Uthman, Abdullah ibn Aamir appointed Abdur Rahman ibn Sumrah to command the army in the invasion of Sistan. Abdur Rahman ibn Sumrah led the army to Sistan, and, after crossing the frontier and overcoming resistance in the border towns, advanced to Zaranj. The old story of siege, blockade and surrender was repeated. Abdur Rahman ibn Sumrah made peace, with the Persians undertaking to pay an annual tribute of 20 million dirham. The Persians also presented 100,000 slaves.

From Zaranj, the Muslim force advanced into the interior of Afghanistan and, after capturing the main town of Helmand, all towns were subjugated. Most of the towns surrendered without offering resistance. The Muslims reached the hill town of Zor, in modern-day central Afghanistan. It is said that after capturing the town, Abdur Rahman ibn Sumrah entered the temple in the town, which had a huge idol with eyes of precious stones, he ordered it broken, saying to the priest that he did so to prove that this idol was capable of doing nothing, and constructed a mosque on the site. Thereafter Abdur Rahman ibn Sumrah marched northwards up to the Hindu Kush mountains in the northeast and captured Ghazni after some resistance and Kabul without any stiff resistance.

After making these conquests, Abdur Rahman ibn Sumrah returned to the provincial capital Zaranj and stayed there as governor till the end of the caliphate of Uthman.

=== Re-conquest of Tabaristan ===
The Māzandarān Province (Tabaristan), which lies south of the Caspian Sea, was conquered during the reign of Umar, under the command of Nuaim ibn Muqarrin's brother, Suwaid ibn Muqarrin. During Uthman's reign it broke into revolt, and Uthman directed Sa'id ibn al-As, the Governor General of Kufa, to suppress it. Saeed ibn Al Aas led a strong force of 80,000 warriors to Tabaristan under his personal command. The force included such eminent persons as 'Abd Allah ibn 'Abbas, 'Abd Allah ibn 'Umar and Abd-Allah ibn al-Zubayr.

The army first entered Qom, which surrendered to them and they then advanced to Tamlisa, a coastal town. It put up a stiff resistance and after a fierce battle the Muslims overpowered the city. All the men were slaughtered and the women and children were made slaves. The harsh treatment by the Muslims of the citizens of Tamlisa, struck terror into the hearts of the people of other towns and they lost the will to resist.

The army thereafter overran the Gīlān Province and other parts of Tabaristan. Even the hilly tract which had not been conquered during the caliphate of Umar was brought under Muslim rule. Having re-conquered the whole of Tabaristan, Saeed ibn Al Aas planned to march to Khorasan, but when he found that Abdullah ibn Aamir, the Governor General of Basra, was already in Khorasan, Saeed ibn Al Aas returned to Kufa.

=== Re-conquest of Azerbaijan and Dagestan ===
Azerbaijan and Dagestan (Russia) were conquered during the reign of Umar and most of the region surrendered to the Muslims without a fight and agreed to pay tribute. Later in his reign it broke into revolt and was re-conquered by force, defeating the Persian forces were General Asfandyar and his brother Bahram.

During the Caliphate of Uthman, Utba bin Farqad remained the governor of the Azerbaijan province, which included modern day Azerbaijan, Georgia, Armenia and Dagestan, it was included in the military dominion of the province of Kufa. When Al-Walid ibn Uqba became the governor of Kufa he re-called Utba bin Farqad. In his absence the Azerbaijan province broke into revolt and Uthman directed Walid ibn Uqba to undertake the campaign to re-conquer it. Walid launched a two pronged attack on Azerbaijan, one from Armenia and the main army under his personal command from Kufa. No pitched battles were fought during the conquest and most towns surrendered and agreed to pay a tribute of 0.8 million dirham annually. Ashat ibn Qais was made governor of Azerbaijan.

=== Re-conquest of Khorasan ===
Khorasan, the province of the Persian Empire expanded from what is now north eastern Iran to western Afghanistan and southern Turkmenistan. It was conquered during the reign of Umar, under the command of Ahnaf ibn Qais. After the death of Umar, Khorasan broke into revolt under Sassanid Emperor Yazdgerd III (betrayed and killed in 651), before he could lead the Persians against the Muslims.

In 651, Uthman sent Abdullah ibn Aamir, the governor of Bosra, to re-conquer Khorasan. Abdullah ibn Aamir marched with a large force from Bosra to Khorasan. After capturing the main forts in Khorasan, he sent many columns in various directions in Khorasan, the strategy was to avoid the Persians and to gather together in a large force. The town of Bayak, in modern-day Afghanistan, was taken by force but the Muslim commander fell fighting in the battle. After Bayak, the Muslims marched towards Tabisan, which was captured with little resistance. Next, after a long siege, the army captured the city of Nishapur. From there the army captured other small towns in the Khurassan region. After consolidating their position in most of Khurassan, they marched towards Herat in Afghanistan, which surrendered peacefully. After getting control of the region the Muslims marched towards the city of Mary, in modern-day Turkmenistan. The city surrendered along with other towns of the region except one, Sang, which was later taken by force. The campaign in Khorasan ended with the conquest of Balkh in 654.

=== Campaign in Transoxiana ===
After consolidating the Muslim authority in Khorasan, Abdullah ibn Aamir crossed the Amu Darya (Oxus River) and invaded Uzbekistan in southern Transoxiana. Details of these campaigns are not known but the source books tell us that a greater part of southern Transoxiana submitted to the suzerainty of Muslim rule.

=== Re-conquest of Makran ===
Makran was conquered during the reign of Umar, in 644, when three columns were sent by three different routes under the command of Hakam ibn Amr, Shahab ibn Makharaq and Abdullah ibn Utban. At the western bank of the Indus River they defeated the Hindu king of Sindh, Raja Rasil. Umar ordered them to consolidate their position on the western bank of the Indus River and not to cross it.

During the reign of Caliph Uthman, Makran broke into revolt along with other Persian dominions. Uthman sent his commander, Ubaidhullah ibn Ma' mar Tamini, to re-conquer Makran, along with other adjoining areas of Persia. In 650, the army under his command conquered it after series of skirmishes, however no pitched battles were fought. Ubaidullah ibn Ma'mar was made the first governor of the Makran region. Later he was given the governorship of another Persian region and was replaced, first by Umair ibn Usman ibn Saeed, and then Saeed ibn Qandir Qarshi, who remained governor until Caliph Uthman died.

=== Conquest of Baluchistan ===
In the 7th century, what is now the Balochistan province of Pakistan, was divided into two main regions, its south-western parts were part of the Kermān Province of the Persian Empire and the north-eastern region was part of the Persian province of Sistan. The southern region was included in Makran.

In early 644, Umar sent Suhail ibn Adi from Bosra to conquer the Kermān Province of Iran; of which he was made governor. From Kermān he entered western Balochistan and conquered the region near the Persian frontiers. South-western Balochistan was conquered during the campaign in Sistan the same year.

During Caliph Uthman's reign in 652, Balochistan was re-conquered during the campaign against the revolt in Kermān, under the command of Majasha ibn Masood. It was the first time that western Balochistan had come directly under the Laws of Caliphate and it paid an agricultural tribute. In those days western Balochistan was included in the dominion of Kermān. In 654, Abdulrehman ibn Samrah was made governor of Sistan and an army was sent under him to crush the revolt in Zarang, which is now in southern Afghanistan. After conquering Zarang a column moved northward to conquer areas up to Kabul and Ghazni in the Hindu Kush mountains. At the same time another column moved towards the Quetta District in the north-western part of Balochistan and conquered an area up to the ancient city of Dawar and Qanzabil. By 654, the whole of what is now the Balochistan province of Pakistan was under the rule of the Rashidun Empire, except for the well-defended mountain town of QaiQan (now Kalat), which was conquered during Caliph Ali's reign. Abdulrehman ibn Samrah made Zaranj his provincial capital and remained governor of these conquered areas from 654 to 656, until Uthman was murdered.

=== Campaign in Sindh ===
The province of Sistan was the largest province of the Persian Empire, its frontiers extending from Sindh in the east, to Balkh (Afghanistan) in the northeast. The Islamic conquest of some parts of Sindh was extension of the campaign to conquer the Persian Empire in 643, by sending seven armies from seven different routes, to different parts of empire.

The army first entered Sindh during the reign of Umar, in 644. It was not a whole scale invasion of Sindh, but was merely an extension of the conquests of the largest province of Persia, Sistan and Makran regions. In 644, the columns of Hakam ibn Amr, Shahab ibn Makharaq and Abdullah ibn Utban concentrated near the west bank of the Indus River and defeated the Hindu king of Sindh, Raja Rasil, his armies retreated and crossed the river.

In response to Umar's question about the Makran region, the messenger from Makran who brought the news of the victory told him:

:'O Commander of the faithful!

It's a land where the plains are stony;
Where water is scanty;
Where the fruits are unsavoury
Where men are known for treachery;
Where plenty is unknown;
Where virtue is held of little account;
And where evil is dominant;
A large army is less for there;
And a less army is use less there;
The land beyond it, is even worst (referring to Sind).

Thereupon, Umar, after listening to the unfavourable situation for sending an army, instructed Hakim bin Amr al Taghlabi that for the time being Makran should be the easternmost frontier of the Rashidun Empire, and that no further attempt should be made to extend the conquests. Thereupon, the commander of the army in Makran said the following verses:

If the Commander of faithful wouldn't have stopped us from going beyond, so we would have bought our forces to the temple of prostitutes.

He was referring to the Hindu temple in the interior of Sindh where prostitutes used to give a part of their earnings as charity.

After the death of Umar, these areas, like other regions of the Persian Empire, broke into revolt and Uthman sent forces to re-conquer them. Uthman also sent his agent, Haheem ibn Jabla Abdi, to investigate the matters of Hind. On his return he told Uthman about the cities, and, after listening to the miserable conditions of the region Uthman avoided campaigning in the Sindh interior, and, like Umar he ordered his armies not to cross the Indus River.

== Bibliography ==
- Charles Diehl (1896), L'Afrique byzantine: histoire de la domination byzantine en Afrique (533-709) (in French), Paris
