= Battle of Oxus River =

Battle within the Muslim conquest of Persia (7th century CE)

- Part of the Muslim conquest of Persia and Muslim conquest of Transoxiana
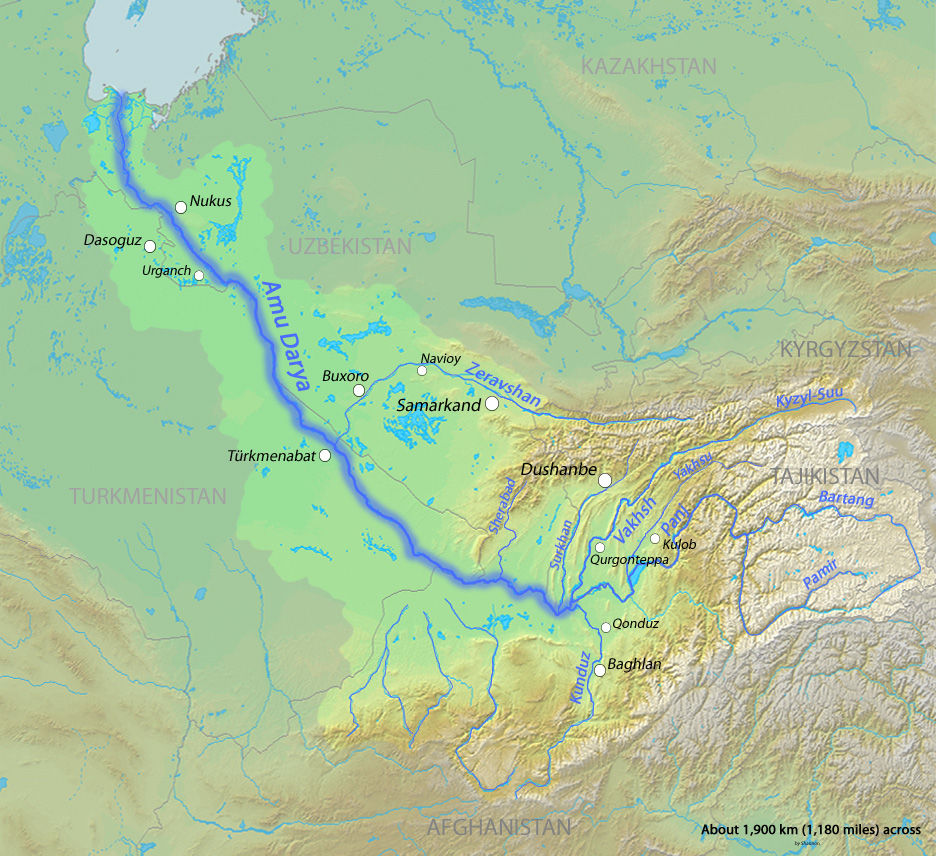
- Map of Oxus River (Amu Darya)
Date	651
Location	Amu Darya, Turkmenistan.
Result	Rashidun victory; Destruction of the Sasanian Empire
Territorial changes	Sasanian Empire annexed by the Rashidun Caliphate

Belligerents
Sasanian Empire; Western Turkic Khaganate	Rashidun Caliphate

Commanders and leaders
Yazdegerd III X (Note: Aftermath of the battle; killed at Merv in 651)	Ahnaf ibn Qais

Strength
50,000	20,000

Casualties and losses
Unknown; Probably heavy	Light

The Battle of Oxus River was a significant battle in the 7th century, fought between the Sasanian Empire and the Muslim Arab army that had overrun Persia. Following his defeat, the last Sasanian Emperor, Yazdegerd III, became a hunted fugitive who fled to Central Asia and then to China.

== Prelude ==
Khorasan was the second largest province of the Sasanian Persian Empire. It stretched from what is now north-eastern Iran, Afghanistan, and Turkmenistan. Its capital was Balkh, now in northern Afghanistan. In 651, the mission of conquering Khurasan was assigned to Ahnaf ibn Qais and Abdullah ibn Aamir. Abdullah marched from Fars and took a short and less frequent route via Rayy. Ahnaf then marched north directly to Merv, in present Turkmenistan. Merv was the capital of Khurasan, and here Yazdegerd III held his court. Upon hearing of the Muslim advance, Yazdegerd III fled to Balkh. No resistance was offered at Merv, and the Muslims occupied the capital of Khurasan without a fight.

== Battle ==
Ahnaf stayed at Merv and waited for reinforcement from Kufa. Yazdegerd proceeded to Soghd, whose ruler supplied him with a large army. Then he marched to Balkh. Ribi' b. Amir, meanwhile, retired with Kufan troops to Marw al-Rudh, where he joined al-Ahnaf. The Sasanian king, leading an army of 50,000 cavalry composed of men from Soghd, Turkestan, Balkh, and Tokharistan, arrived at Marw al-Rudh. Ahnaf had an army of 20,000 men. The two sides fought each other from morning till evening for two months at a place called Deir al-Ahnaf. The fighting at Deir al-Ahnaf went on until Ahnaf, Yazdegerd, meanwhile, left from Marw al-Rudh to Merv, from where he took his empire's wealth and proceeded to Balkh to join the Khakan. He told his officials that he wanted to hand himself over to the protection of the Turks, but they advised him against it and asked him to seek protection from the Arabs, which he refused. He left for Turkestan while his officials took away his treasures and gave them to Ahnaf, submitting to the Arabs and being allowed to go back to their respective homes.

== Aftermath ==
After being defeated at the Battle of Oxus River, Yazdegerd III was unable to raise another army and became a hunted fugitive. Following the battle, he fled to Central Asia. From there, Yazdegerd went to China. Nevertheless, Yazdegerd III kept on intruding in Persia, using his influence over the notables and chiefs of Persia, and thus remained a motivating force behind the Persian rebellion. During Caliph Uthman's reign, Yazdegerd III came back to Bactria and Khorasan rebelled against the Caliphate. Abdullah ibn Aamir crushed the rebellion and defeated Yazdegerd's forces. He fled from one district to another until a local miller killed him for his purse at Merv in 651.

== See also ==
- Islamic conquest of Persia
- Muslim conquests
- Sasanian Empire
- Rashidun army
