= Persecution of Christians =

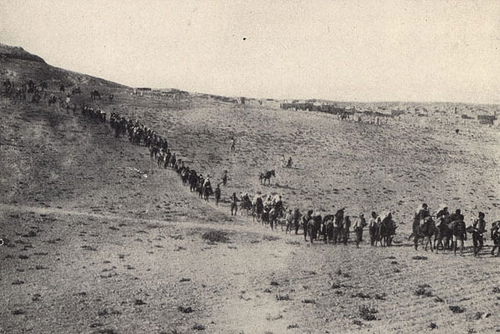
Greek Christians in 1922, fleeing from their homes in Kharput and moving to Trebizond. In the 1910s and 1920s, the Armenian, Greek, and Assyrian genocides were perpetrated by the Ottoman Empire and its successor state, the Republic of Turkey.

Throughout the history of Christianity, the persecution of Christians can be traced from the first century of the Christian era to the present day. Christian missionaries and converts to Christianity have both been targeted for religious persecution, sometimes to the point of being martyred for their faith, ever since the emergence of Christianity.

Early Christians were persecuted at the hands of both Jews, from whose religion Christianity arose, and the Romans who controlled many of the early centers of Christianity in the Roman Empire. Since the emergence of Christian states in Late Antiquity, Christians have also been persecuted by other Christians due to differences in doctrine which have been declared heretical. Early in the fourth century, the empire's official persecutions were ended by the Edict of Serdica in 311 and the practice of Christianity legalized by the Edict of Milan in 312. By the year 380, Christians had begun to persecute each other. The schisms of late antiquity and the Middle Ages – including the Rome–Constantinople schisms and the many Christological controversies – together with the later Protestant Reformation provoked severe conflicts between Christian denominations. During these conflicts, members of the various denominations frequently persecuted each other and engaged in sectarian violence.

During the 20th century, Christian populations were persecuted, sometimes, they were persecuted to the point of genocide, by various states, including the Ottoman Empire and its successor state, the Republic of Turkey, which committed the Hamidian massacres, the late Ottoman genocides (comprising the Armenian, Greek, and Assyrian genocides), and the Diyarbekir genocide, and atheist states such as those of the former Eastern Bloc.

The persecution of Christians has continued to occur during the 21st century. Christianity is the largest world religion and as a result, adherents of it live across the globe. Approximately 10% of the world's Christians are members of minority groups which live in non-Christian-majority states. The contemporary persecution of Christians includes the official state persecution mostly occurring in countries which are located in Africa and Asia because they have state religions or because their governments and societies practice religious favoritism. Such favoritism is frequently accompanied by religious discrimination and religious persecution.

According to the United States Commission on International Religious Freedom's 2020 report, Christians in Burma, China, Eritrea, India, Iran, Nigeria, North Korea, Pakistan, Russia, Saudi Arabia, Syria, and Vietnam are persecuted; these countries are labelled "countries of particular concern" by the United States Department of State, because of their governments' engagement in, or toleration of, "severe violations of religious freedom". The same report also states that Afghanistan, Algeria, Azerbaijan, Bahrain, the Central African Republic, Cuba, Egypt, Indonesia, Iraq, Kazakhstan, Malaysia, Sudan, and Turkey constitute the US State Department's "special watchlist" of countries in which the government allows or engages in "severe violations of religious freedom".

Much of the persecution of Christians in recent times is perpetrated by non-state actors which are labelled "entities of particular concern" by the US State Department, including the Islamist groups Boko Haram in Nigeria, the Houthi movement in Yemen, the Islamic State of Iraq and the Levant – Khorasan Province in Pakistan, al-Shabaab in Somalia, the Taliban in Afghanistan, the Islamic State as well as the United Wa State Army and participants in the Kachin conflict in Myanmar.

== Antiquity ==
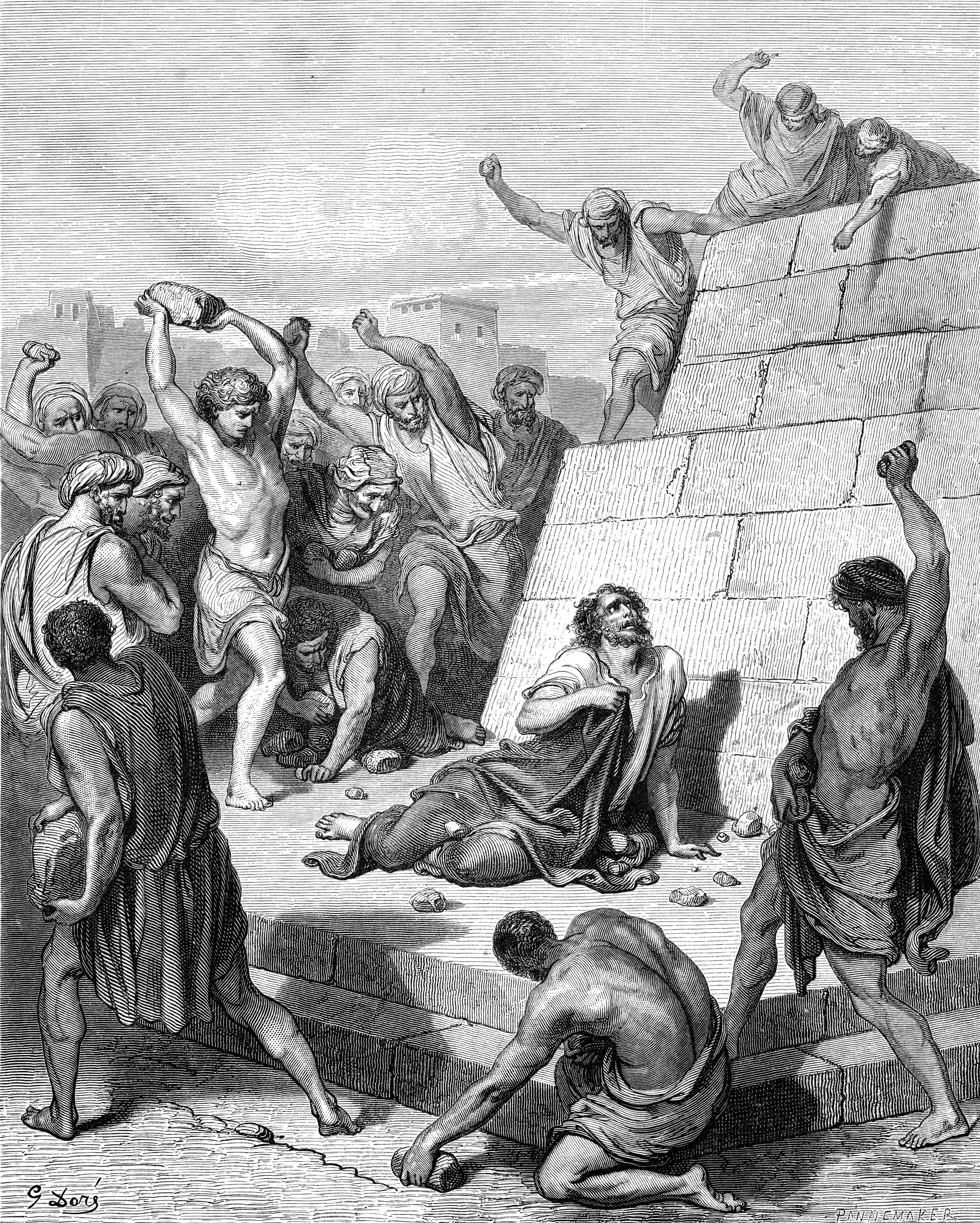
Death of Saint Stephen, "the Protomartyr", recounted in Acts 7, depicted in an engraving by Gustave Doré (published 1866)

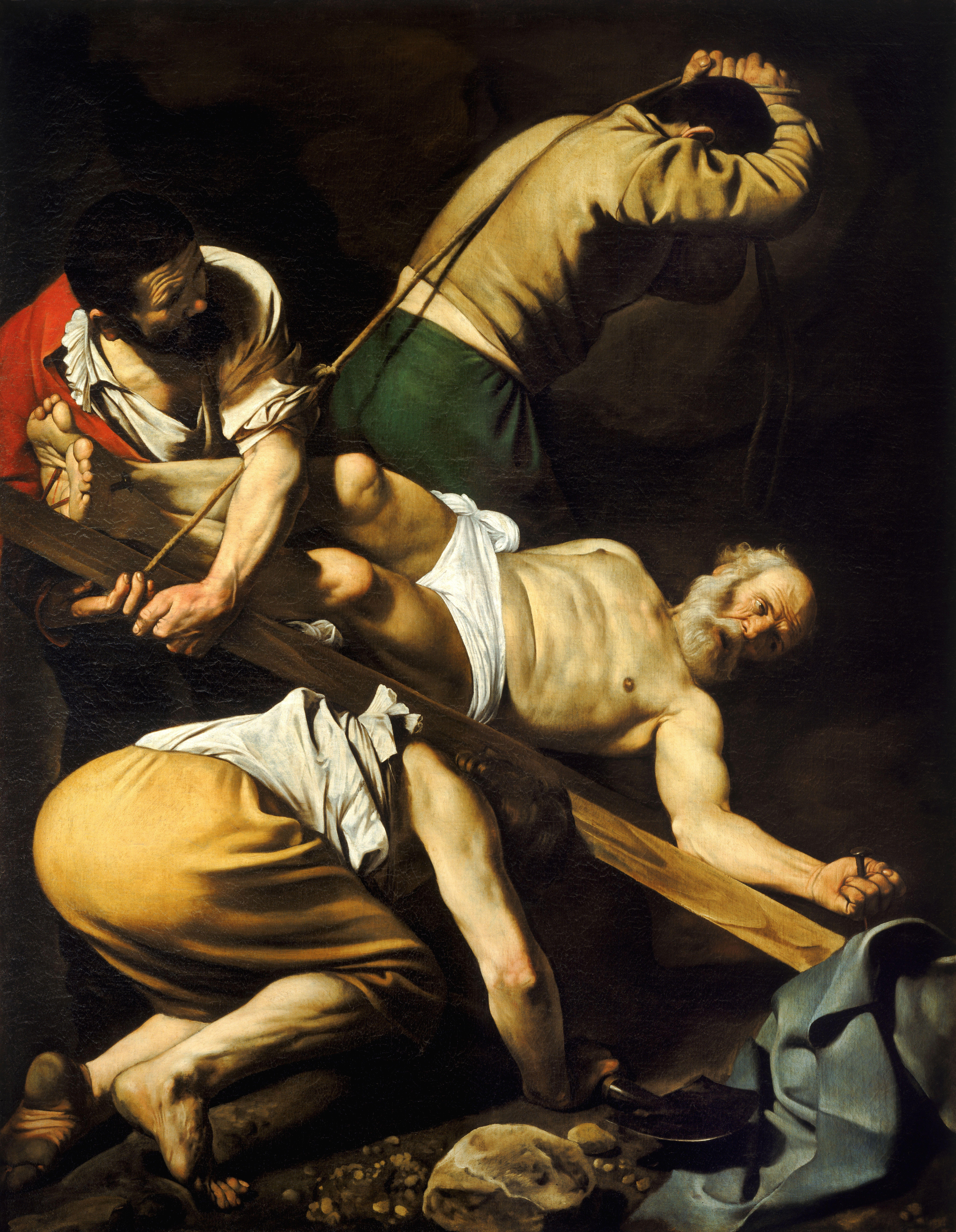
Crucifixion of Saint Peter by Caravaggio (1600, Cerasi Chapel)

=== New Testament ===
Early Christianity originated as a sect of Second Temple Judaism, and inter-communal dissension arose almost immediately. According to his own letters, before his conversion to Christianity, Saul of Tarsus (Paul the Apostle) persecuted the Christ-following assemblies, probably referring to Jewish followers of Jesus. However, the letters do not explain what this activity entailed. The Acts of the Apostles later expands on Paul's remarks, portraying him as involved in the repression of believers in Jerusalem. According to that account, about a year after the Roman crucifixion of Jesus, Stephen was stoned by a mob for what some Jews regarded as transgressions of Jewish law. Paul acquiesced, looking on and witnessing Stephen's death.

In 2 Corinthians 11, Paul lists his own sufferings after his conversion. He states that he was subjected to repeated floggings by Jewish authorities (up to the traditional maximum of thirty-nine lashes), beaten with rods by Roman magistrates, stoned (possibly by a mob), and exposed to dangers such as shipwreck, robbery, and threats from multiple groups. He mentions dangers "from my own people, from pagans," and even from rival members within the Christ movement ("false brothers"). As a Jewish apostle preaching to gentiles, Paul demanded that non-Jews abandon their traditional gods and worship only the God of Israel. This message could provoke hostility from pagan populations, Roman officials concerned with public order, and Jewish diaspora communities, since Jews generally allowed non-Jewish sympathizers ("God-fearers") to honor the God of Israel and attend synagogues without renouncing their own gods.

=== Early Christianity ===
In 41 AD, Herod Agrippa, who already possessed the territory of Herod Antipas and Philip (his former colleagues in the Herodian Tetrarchy), obtained the title of King of the Jews, and in a sense, re-formed the Kingdom of Judea of Herod the Great (r. 37–4 BC). Herod Agrippa was reportedly responsible for the persecution in which James the Great lost his life, Saint Peter narrowly escaped and the rest of the apostles took flight. After Agrippa's death in 44, the Roman procuratorship began (before 41 they were Prefects in Iudaea Province) and those leaders maintained a neutral peace, until the procurator Porcius Festus died in 62 and the high priest Ananus ben Ananus took advantage of the power vacuum to execute James the Just, then leader of Jerusalem's Christians.

According to the New Testament, Paul was imprisoned on several occasions by the Roman authorities, stoned by Jews and left for dead on one occasion, and was eventually taken to Rome as a prisoner. Peter and other early Christians were also imprisoned and prosecuted. The First Jewish Rebellion led to the destruction of Jerusalem in 70 AD, the end of Second Temple Judaism (and the subsequent slow rise of Rabbinic Judaism).

Claudia Setzer asserts that, "Jews did not see Christians as clearly separate from their own community until at least the middle of the second century" but most scholars place the "parting of the ways" much earlier, with theological separation occurring immediately. Second Temple Judaism had allowed more than one way to be Jewish. After the fall of the Temple, one way led to rabbinic Judaism, while another way became Christianity; but Christianity was "molded around the conviction that the Jew, Jesus of Nazareth, was not only the Messiah promised to the Jews, but God's son, offering access to God, and God's blessing to non-Jew as much as, and perhaps eventually more than, to Jews". While Messianic eschatology had deep roots in Judaism, and the idea of the suffering servant, known as Messiah Ephraim, had been an aspect since the time of Isaiah (7th century BCE), in the first century, this idea was seen as being usurped by the Christians. It was then suppressed, and did not make its way back into rabbinic teaching till the seventh century writings of Pesiqta Rabati.

The traditional view of the separation of Judaism and Christianity has Jewish-Christians fleeing, en masse, to Pella (shortly before the fall of the Temple in 70 AD) as a result of persecution. Steven D. Katz says "there can be no doubt that the post-70 situation witnessed a change in the relations of Jews and Christians". Judaism sought to reconstitute itself after the disaster which included determining the proper response to Jewish Christianity. The exact shape of this is not directly known but is traditionally alleged to have taken four forms: the circulation of official anti-Christian pronouncements, the issuing of an official ban against Christians attending synagogue, a prohibition against reading heretical writings, and the spreading of the curse against heretics.

=== Roman Empire ===
==== Neronian persecution ====
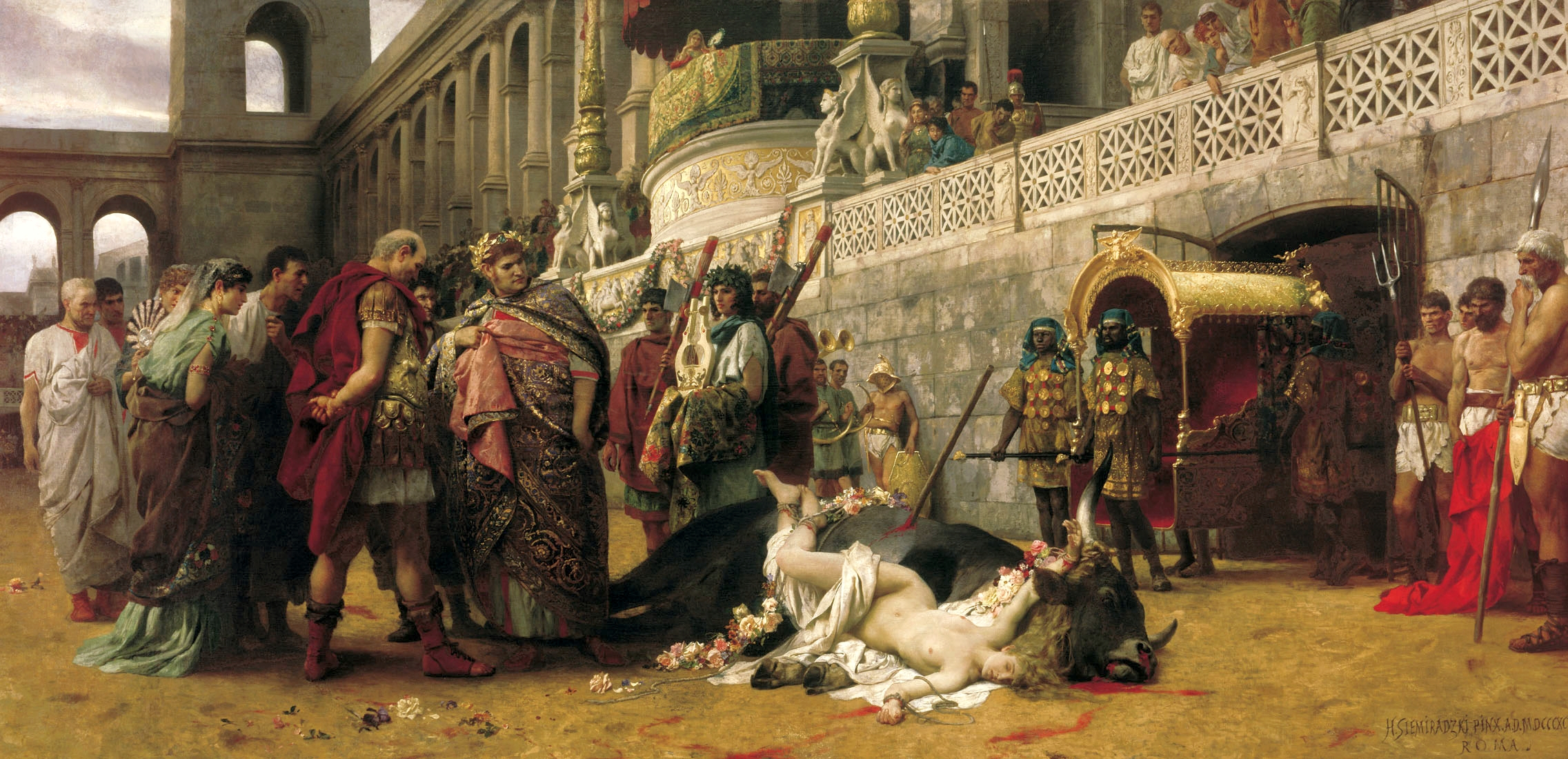
A Christian Dirce, by Henryk Siemiradzki (1897, National Museum, Warsaw) A Christian woman is martyred under Nero in this re-enactment of the myth of Dirce

The first documented case of imperially supervised persecution of Christians in the Roman Empire begins with Nero (54–68). In the Annals, Tacitus states that Nero blamed Christians for the Great Fire of Rome, and while it is generally believed to be authentic and reliable, some modern scholars have cast doubt on this view, largely because there is no further reference to Nero's blaming of Christians for the fire until the late 4th century. Suetonius mentions punishments inflicted on Christians, defined as men following a new and malefic superstition, but does not specify the reasons for the punishment; he simply lists the fact together with other abuses put down by Nero. It is widely agreed on that the Number of the beast in the Book of Revelation, adding up to 666, is derived from a gematria of the name of Nero Caesar, indicating that Nero was viewed as an exceptionally evil figure. Several Christian sources report that Paul the Apostle and Saint Peter both died during the Neronian persecution.

==== From Nero to Decius ====
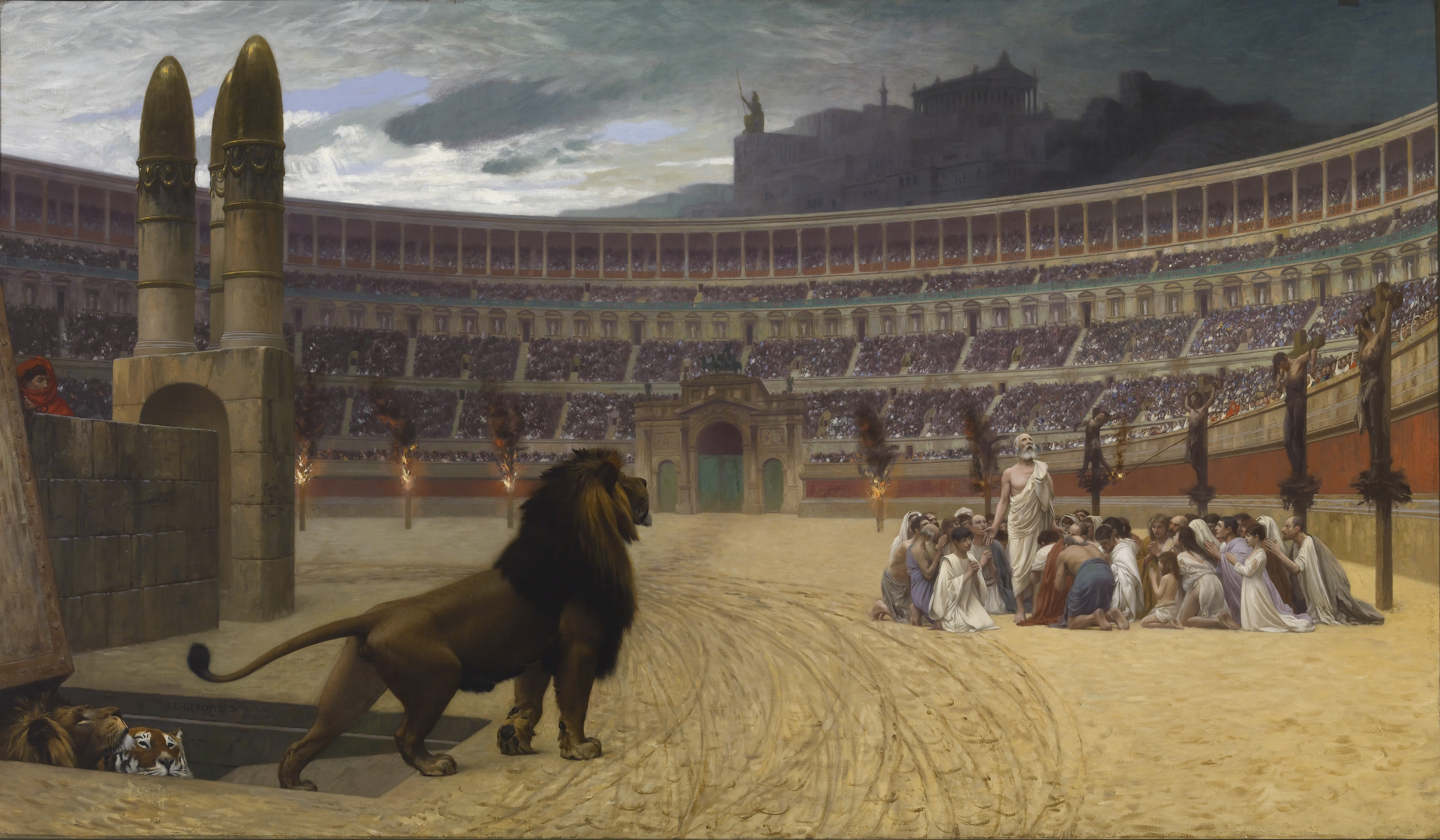
The Christian Martyrs' Last Prayer by Jean-Léon Gérôme (1863–1883, Walters Art Museum). A fanciful scene of damnatio ad bestias in ancient Rome's Circus Maximus beneath the Palatine Hill.

In the first two centuries Christianity was a relatively small sect which was not a significant concern of the Emperor. Rodney Stark estimates there were fewer than 10,000 Christians in the year 100. Christianity grew to about 200,000 by the year 200, which works out to about 0.36% of the population of the empire, and then to almost 2 million by 250, still making up less than 2% of the empire's overall population. According to Guy Laurie, the Church was not in a struggle for its existence during its first centuries. However, Bernard Green says that, although early persecutions of Christians were generally sporadic, local, and under the direction of regional governors, not emperors, Christians "were always subject to oppression and at risk of open persecution." Trajan's policy towards Christians was no different from the treatment of other sects; that is, they would only be punished if they refused to worship the emperor and the gods, but they were not to be sought out.

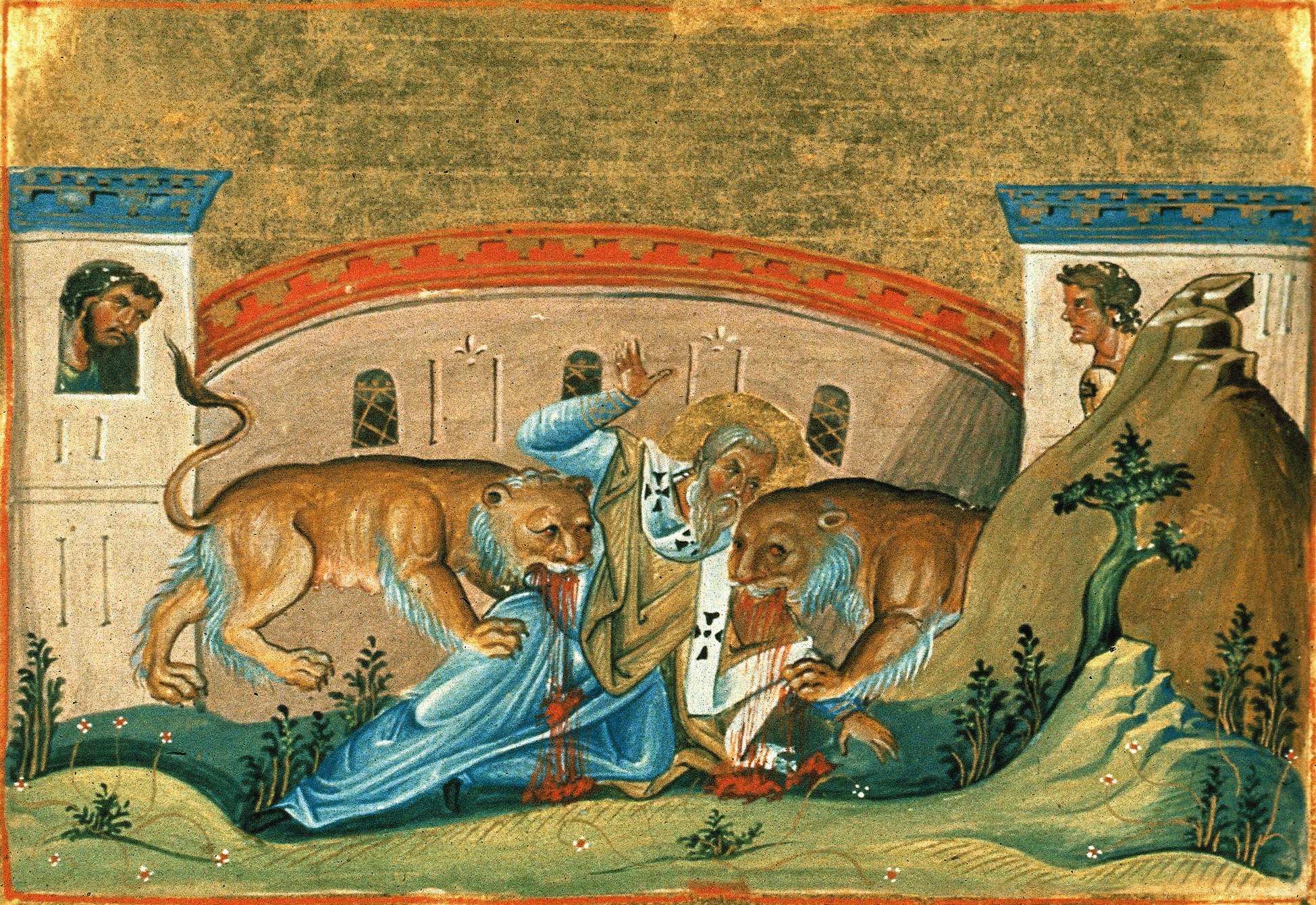
Execution of Ignatius of Antioch, reputed to have been killed in Rome under the emperor Trajan, depicted in the Menologion of Basil II, an illuminated manuscript prepared for the emperor Basil II in c. 1000

James L. Papandrea says there are ten emperors generally accepted to have sponsored state-sanctioned persecution of Christians, though the first empire-wide government-sponsored persecution was not until Decius in 249. One early account of a mass killing is the persecution in Lyon in which Christians were purportedly mass-slaughtered by being thrown to wild beasts under the decree of Roman officials for reportedly refusing to renounce their faith according to Irenaeus. In the 3rd century, Emperor Severus Alexander's household contained many Christians, but his successor, Maximinus Thrax, hating this household, ordered that the leaders of the churches should be put to death. According to Eusebius, this persecution sent Hippolytus of Rome and Pope Pontian into exile, but other evidence suggests that the persecutions were local to the provinces where they occurred rather than happening under the direction of the Emperor.

According to two different Christian traditions, Simon bar Kokhba, the leader of the third Jewish revolt against Rome (132–136 AD), who was proclaimed Messiah, persecuted the Christians: Justin Martyr says that Christians were punished if they did not deny and blaspheme Jesus Christ, while Eusebius asserts that Bar Kokhba harassed them because they refused to join his revolt against the Romans.

===== Voluntary martyrdom =====
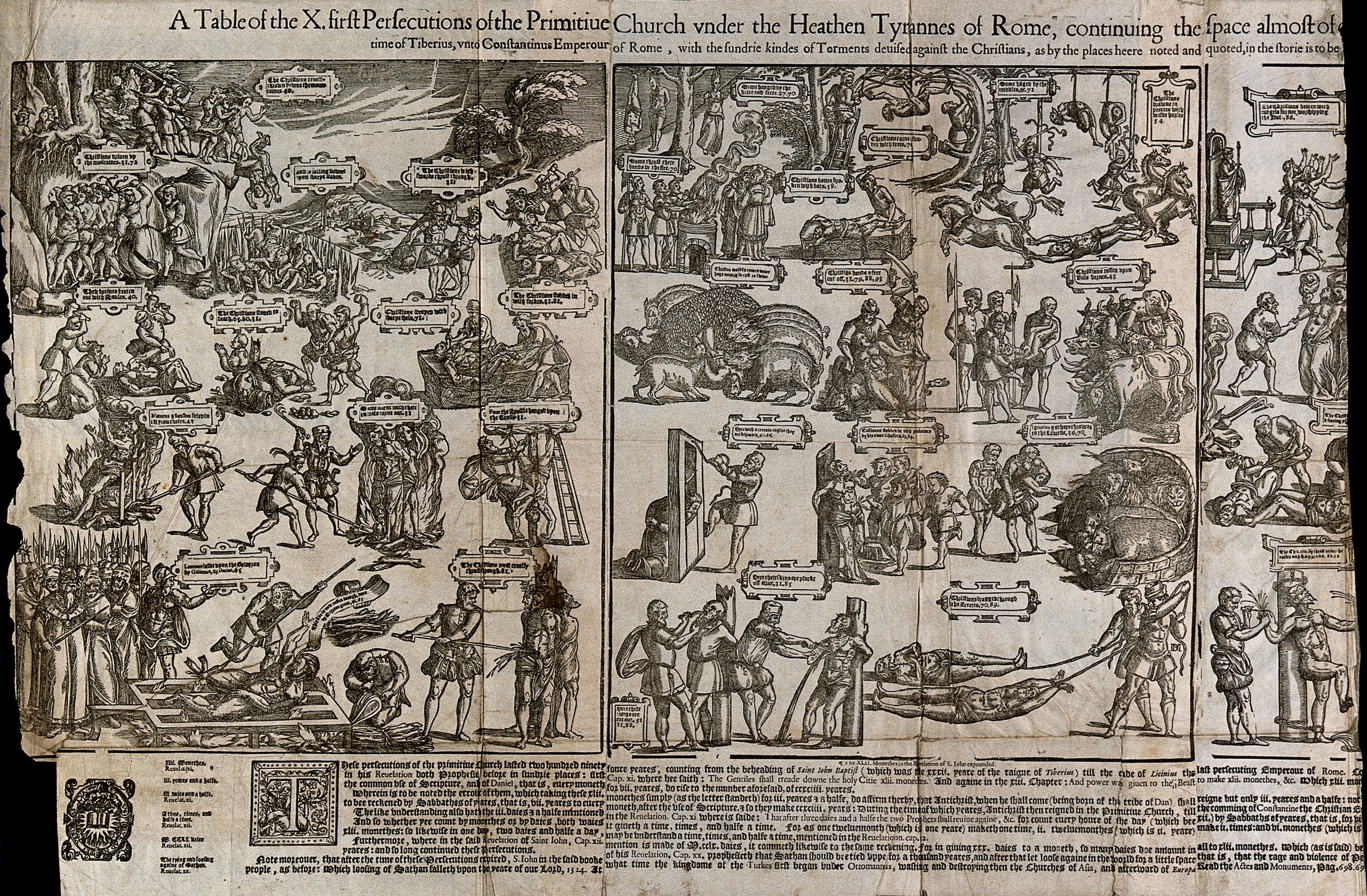
Woodcut illustration for the 1570 edition of John Foxe's Book of Martyrs showing the "persecutions of the primitive Church under the heathen tyrants of Rome" and depicting the "sundry kinds of torments devised against the Christians"

Some early Christians sought out and welcomed martyrdom. According to Droge and Tabor, "in 185 the proconsul of Asia, Arrius Antoninus, was approached by a group of Christians demanding to be executed. The proconsul obliged some of them and then sent the rest away, saying that if they wanted to kill themselves there was plenty of rope available or cliffs they could jump off." Such enthusiasm for death is found in the letters of Saint Ignatius of Antioch, who was arrested and condemned as a criminal before writing his letters while on the way to execution. Ignatius casts his own martyrdom as a voluntary eucharistic sacrifice to be embraced.

"Many martyr acts present martyrdom as a sharp choice that cut to the core of Christian identity – life or death, salvation or damnation, Christ or apostacy..." Subsequently, the martyr literature has drawn distinctions between those who were enthusiastically pro-voluntary-martyrdom (the Montanists and Donatists), those who occupied a neutral, moderate position (the orthodox), and those who were anti-martyrdom (the Gnostics).

The category of voluntary martyr began to emerge only in the third century in the context of efforts to justify flight from persecution. The condemnation of voluntary martyrdom is used to justify Clement fleeing the Severan persecution in Alexandria in 202 AD, and the Martyrdom of Polycarp justifies Polycarp's flight on the same grounds. "Voluntary martyrdom is parsed as passionate foolishness" whereas "flight from persecution is patience" and the result a true martyrdom.

Daniel Boyarin rejects use of the term "voluntary martyrdom", saying, "if martyrdom is not voluntary, it is not martyrdom". G. E. M. de Ste. Croix adds a category of "quasi-voluntary martyrdom": "martyrs who were not directly responsible for their own arrest but who, after being arrested, behaved with" a stubborn refusal to obey or comply with authority. Candida Moss asserts that De Ste. Croix's judgment of what values are worth dying for is modern, and does not represent classical values. According to her there was no such concept as "quasi-volunteer martyrdom" in ancient times.

==== Decian persecution ====
In the reign of the emperor Decius (r. 249–251), a decree was issued requiring that all residents of the empire should perform sacrifices, to be enforced by the issuing of each person with a libellus certifying that they had performed the necessary ritual. It is not known what motivated Decius's decree, or whether it was intended to target Christians, though it is possible the emperor was seeking divine favors in the forthcoming wars with the Carpi and the Goths. Christians that refused to publicly offer sacrifices or burn incense to Roman gods were accused of impiety and punished by arrest, imprisonment, torture or execution. According to Eusebius, bishops Alexander of Jerusalem, Babylas of Antioch, and Fabian of Rome were all imprisoned and killed. The patriarch Dionysius of Alexandria escaped captivity, while the bishop Cyprian of Carthage fled his episcopal see to the countryside. The Christian church, despite no indication in the surviving texts that the edict targeted any specific group, never forgot the reign of Decius whom they labelled as that "fierce tyrant". After Decius died, Trebonianus Gallus (r. 251–253) succeeded him and continued the Decian persecution for the duration of his reign.

==== Valerianic persecution ====
The accession of Trebonianus Gallus's successor Valerian (r. 253–260) ended the Decian persecution. In 257 however, Valerian began to enforce public religion. Cyprian of Carthage was exiled and executed the following year, while Pope Sixtus II was also put to death. Dionysius of Alexandria was tried, urged to recognize "the natural gods" in the hope his congregation would imitate him, and exiled when he refused.

Valerian was defeated by the Persians at the Battle of Edessa and himself taken prisoner in 260. According to Eusebius, Valerian's son, co-augustus, and successor Gallienus (r. 253–268) allowed Christian communities to use again their cemeteries and made restitution of their confiscated buildings. Eusebius wrote that Gallienus allowed the Christians "freedom of action".

== Late antiquity ==
=== Roman Empire ===
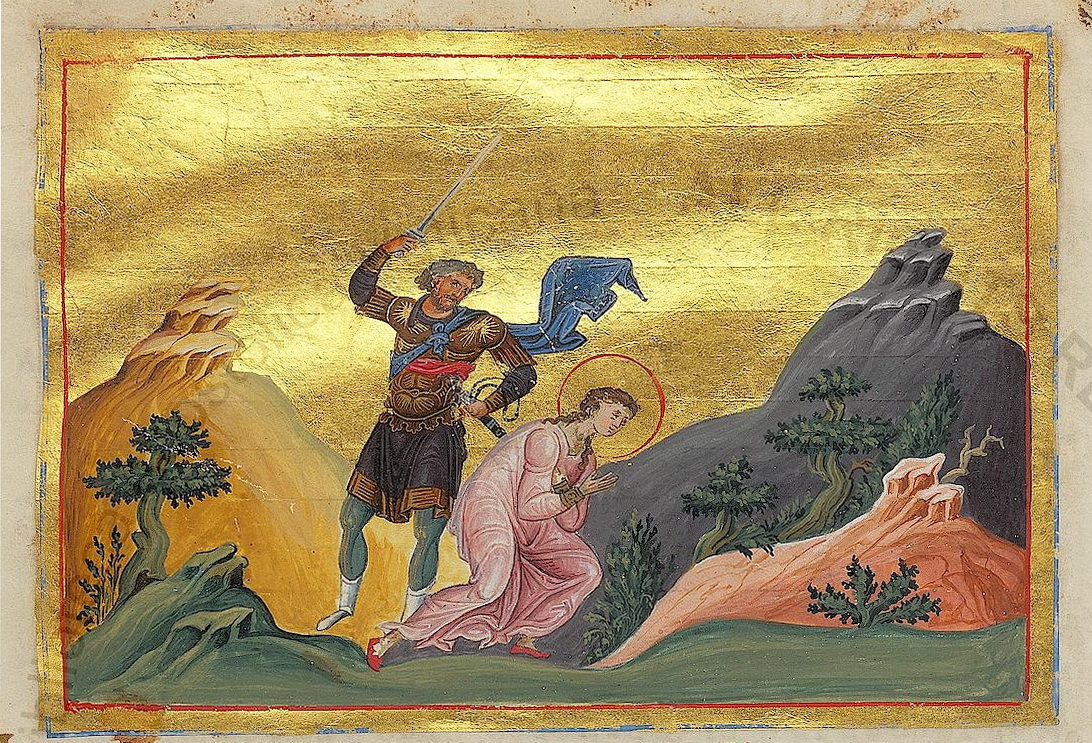
Execution of Saint Barbara, reputed to have been killed under the emperor Diocletian, depicted in the Menologion of Basil II

==== The Great Persecution ====
The Great Persecution, or Diocletianic Persecution, was begun by the senior augustus and Roman emperor Diocletian (r. 284–305) on 23 February 303. In the eastern Roman empire, the official persecution lasted intermittently until 313, while in the Western Roman Empire the persecution went unenforced from 306. According to Lactantius's De mortibus persecutorum ("on the deaths of the persecutors"), Diocletian's junior emperor, the caesar Galerius (r. 293–311) pressured the augustus to begin persecuting Christians. Eusebius of Caesarea's Church History reports that imperial edicts were promulgated to destroy churches and confiscate scriptures, and to remove Christian occupants of government positions, while Christian priests were to be imprisoned and required to perform sacrifice in ancient Roman religion. In the account of Eusebius, an unnamed Christian man (named by later hagiographers as Euethius of Nicomedia and venerated on 27 February) tore down a public notice of an imperial edict while the emperors Diocletian and Galerius were in Nicomedia (İzmit), one of Diocletian's capitals; according to Lactantius, he was tortured and burned alive. According to Lactantius, the church at Nicomedia (İzmit) was destroyed, while the Optatan Appendix has an account from the praetorian prefecture of Africa involving the confiscation of written materials which led to the Donatist schism. According to Eusebius's Martyrs of Palestine and Lactantius's De mortibus persecutorum, a fourth edict in 304 demanded that everyone perform sacrifices, though in the western empire this was not enforced.

An "unusually philosophical" dialogue is recorded in the trial proceedings of Phileas of Thmuis, bishop of Thmuis in Egypt's Nile Delta, which survive on Greek papyri from the 4th century among the Bodmer Papyri and the Chester Beatty Papyri of the Bodmer and Chester Beatty libraries and in manuscripts in Latin, Ethiopic, and Coptic languages from later centuries, a body of hagiography known as the Acts of Phileas. Phileas was condemned at his fifth trial at Alexandria under Clodius Culcianus, the praefectus Aegypti on 4 February 305 (the 10th day of Mecheir).

In the western empire, the Diocletianic Persecution ceased with the usurpation by two emperors' sons in 306: that of Constantine, who was acclaimed augustus by the army after his father Constantius I (r. 293–306) died, and that of Maxentius (r. 306–312) who was elevated to augustus by the Roman Senate after the grudging retirement of his father Maximian (r. 285–305) and his co-augustus Diocletian in May 305. Of Maxentius, who controlled Italy with his now un-retired father, and Constantine, who controlled Britain, Gaul, and Iberia, neither was inclined to continue the persecution. In the eastern empire however, Galerius, now augustus, continued Diocletian's policy. Eusebius's Church History and Martyrs of Palestine both give accounts of martyrdom and persecution of Christians, including Eusebius's own mentor Pamphilus of Caesarea, with whom he was imprisoned during the persecution.

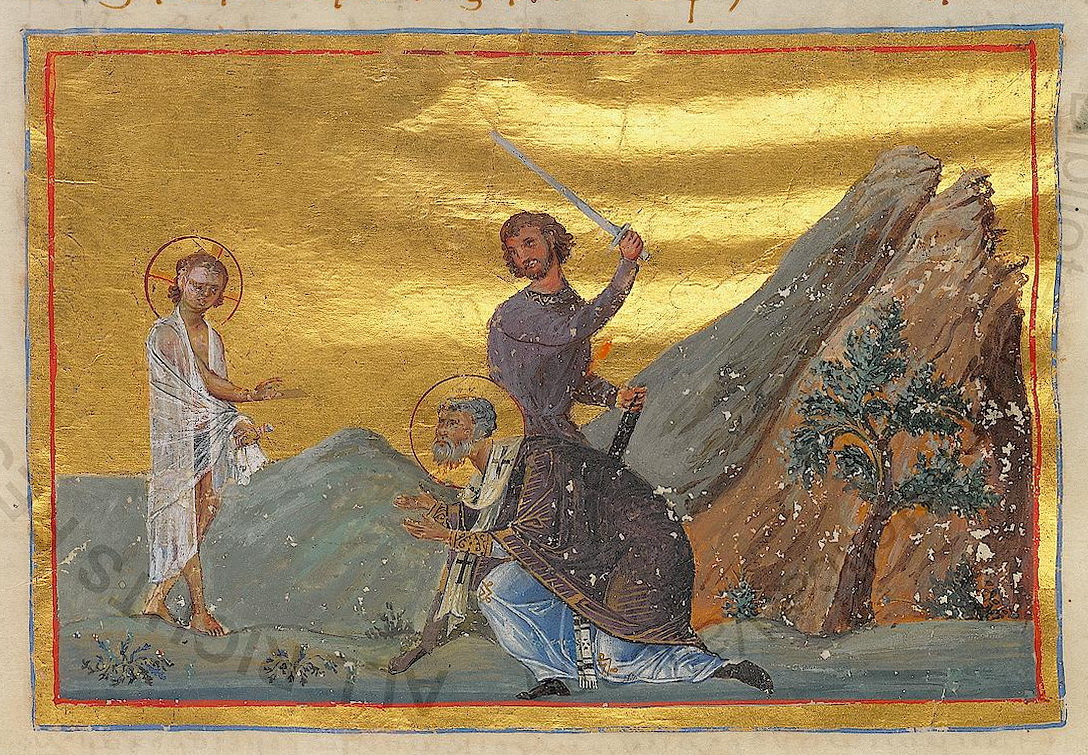
The execution of the patriarch Peter of Alexandria under the emperor Maximinus Daia, depicted in the Menologion of Basil II

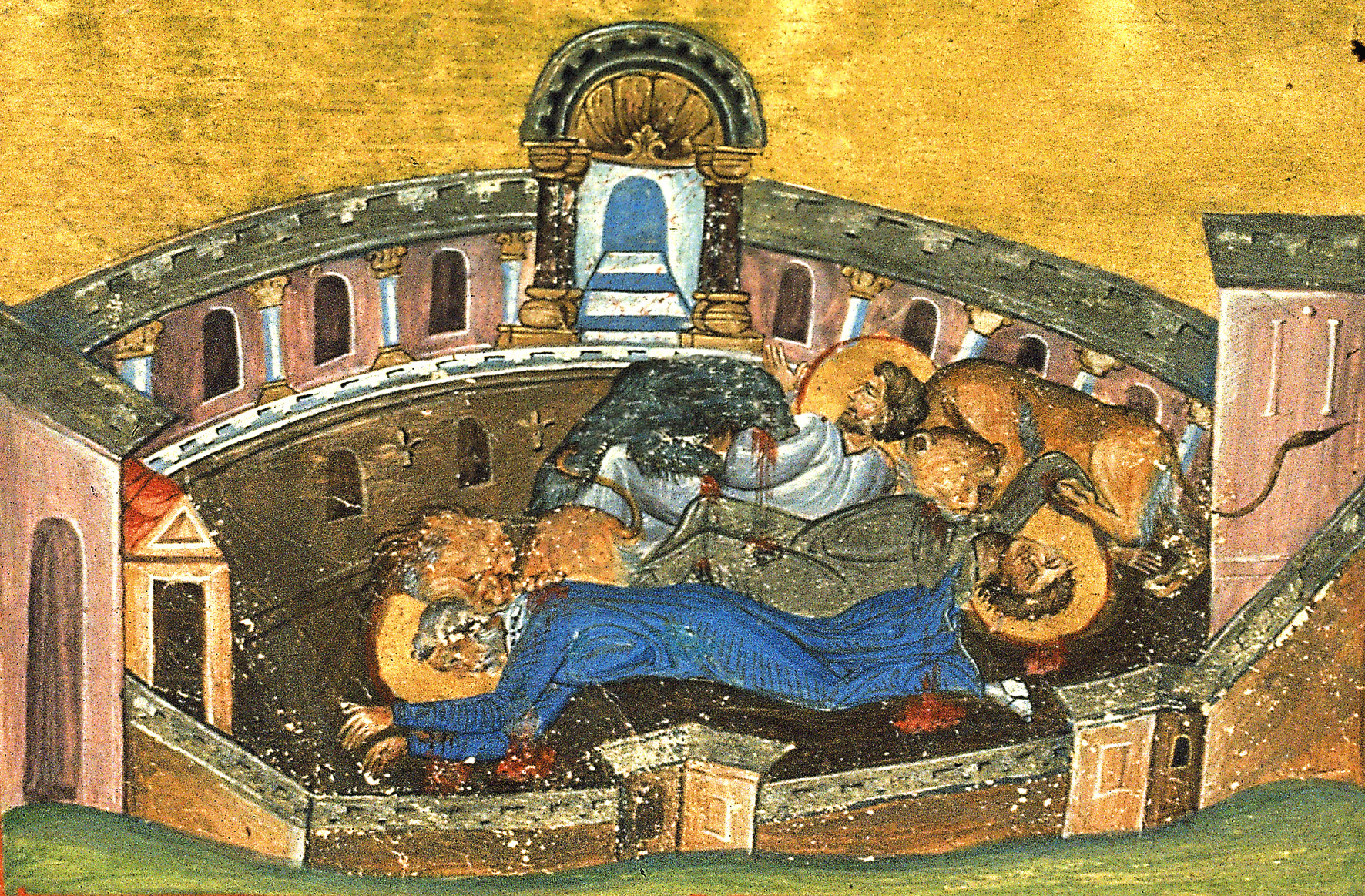
The execution of the martyrs Luke the Deacon, Mocius the Reader, and Silvanus, bishop of Emesa, reputed to have been killed under the emperor Maximinus Daia, depicted in the Menologion of Basil II

When Galerius died in May 311, he is reported by Lactantius and Eusebius to have composed a deathbed edict – the Edict of Serdica – allowing the assembly of Christians in conventicles and explaining the motives for the prior persecution. Eusebius wrote that Easter was celebrated openly. By autumn however, Galerius's nephew, former caesar, and co-augustus Maximinus Daia (r. 310–313) was enforcing Diocletian's persecution in his territories in Anatolia and the Diocese of the East in response to petitions from numerous cities and provinces, including Antioch, Tyre, Lycia, and Pisidia. Maximinus was also encouraged to act by an oracular pronouncement made by a statue of Zeus Philios set up in Antioch by Theotecnus of Antioch, who also organized an anti-Christian petition to be sent from the Antiochenes to Maximinus, requesting that the Christians there be expelled. Among the Christians known to have died in this phase of the persecution are the presbyter Lucian of Antioch, the bishop Methodius of Olympus in Lycia, and Peter, the patriarch of Alexandria. Defeated in a civil war by the augustus Licinius (r. 308–324), Maximinus died in 313, ending the systematic persecution of Christianity as a whole in the Roman Empire. Only one martyr is known by name from the reign of Licinius, who issued the Edict of Milan jointly with his ally, co-augustus, and brother-in-law Constantine, which had the effect of resuming the toleration of before the persecution and returning confiscated property to Christian owners.

The New Catholic Encyclopedia states that "Ancient, medieval and early modern hagiographers were inclined to exaggerate the number of martyrs. Since the title of martyr is the highest title to which a Christian can aspire, this tendency is natural". Attempts at estimating the numbers involved are inevitably based on inadequate sources.

==== Constantinian period ====
The Christian church marked the conversion of Constantine the Great as the final fulfillment of its heavenly victory over the "false gods". The Roman state had always seen itself as divinely directed, now it saw the first great age of persecution, in which the Devil was considered to have used open violence to dissuade the growth of Christianity, at an end. The orthodox catholic Christians close to the Roman state represented imperial persecution as an historical phenomenon, rather than a contemporary one. According to MacMullan, the Christian histories are colored by this "triumphalism".

Peter Leithart says that, "[Constantine] did not punish pagans for being pagans, or Jews for being Jews, and did not adopt a policy of forced conversion". Pagans remained in important positions at his court. He outlawed the gladiatorial shows, destroyed some temples and plundered more, and used forceful rhetoric against non-Christians, but he never engaged in a purge. Maxentius' supporters were not slaughtered when Constantine took the capital; Licinius' family and court were not killed. However, followers of doctrines which were seen as heretical or causing schism were persecuted during the reign of Constantine, the first Christian Roman emperor, and they would be persecuted again later in the 4th century. The consequence of Christian doctrinal disputes was generally mutual excommunication, but once Roman government became involved in ecclesiastical politics, rival factions could find themselves subject to "repression, expulsion, imprisonment or exile" carried out by the Roman army.

In 312, the Christian sect called Donatists appealed to Constantine to solve a dispute. He convened a synod of bishops to hear the case, but the synod sided against them. The Donatists refused to accept the ruling, so a second gathering of 200 at Arles, in 314, was called, but they also ruled against them. The Donatists again refused to accept the ruling, and proceeded to act accordingly by establishing their own bishop, building their own churches, and refusing cooperation. This was a defiance of imperial authority, and it produced the same response Rome had taken in the past against such refusals. For a Roman emperor, "religion could be tolerated only as long as it contributed to the stability of the state". Constantine used the army in an effort to compel Donatist' obedience, burning churches and martyring some from 317 – 321. Constantine failed in reaching his goal and ultimately conceded defeat. The schism remained and Donatism continued. After Constantine, his youngest son Flavius Julius Constans, initiated the Macarian campaign against the Donatists from 346 – 348 which only succeeded in renewing sectarian strife and creating more martyrs. Donatism continued.

The fourth century was dominated by its many conflicts defining orthodoxy versus heterodoxy and heresy. In the Eastern Roman empire, known as Byzantium, the Arian controversy began with its debate of Trinitarian formulas which lasted 56 years. As it moved into the West, the center of the controversy was the "champion of orthodoxy", Athanasius. In 355 Constantius, who supported Arianism, ordered the suppression and exile of Athanasius, expelled the orthodox Pope Liberius from Rome, and exiled bishops who refused to assent to Athanasius's exile. In 355, Dionysius, bishop of Mediolanum (Milan) was expelled from his episcopal see and replaced by the Arian Christian Auxentius of Milan. When Constantius returned to Rome in 357, he consented to allow the return of Liberius to the papacy; the Arian Pope Felix II, who had replaced him, was then driven out along with his followers.

The last emperor of the Constantinian dynasty, Constantine's half-brother's son Julian (r. 361–363) opposed Christianity and sought to restore traditional religion, though he did not arrange a general or official persecution.

==== Valentinianic–Theodosian period ====
According to the Collectio Avellana, on the death of Pope Liberius in 366, Damasus, assisted by hired gangs of "charioteers" and men "from the arena", broke into the Basilica Julia to violently prevent the election of Pope Ursicinus. The battle lasted three days, "with great slaughter of the faithful" and a week later Damasus seized the Lateran Basilica, had himself ordained as Pope Damasus I, and compelled the praefectus urbi Viventius and the praefectus annonae to exile Ursicinus. Damasus then had seven Christian priests arrested and awaiting banishment, but they escaped and "gravediggers" and minor clergy joined another mob of hippodrome and amphitheatre men assembled by the pope to attack the Liberian Basilica, where Ursacinus's loyalists had taken refuge. According to Ammianus Marcellinus, on 26 October, the pope's mob killed 137 people in the church in just one day, and many more died subsequently. The Roman public frequently enjoined the emperor Valentinian the Great to remove Damasus from the throne of Saint Peter, calling him a murderer for having waged a "filthy war" against the Christians.

In the 4th century, the Terving king Athanaric in c. 375 ordered the Gothic persecution of Christians. Athanaric was perturbed by the spread of Gothic Christianity among his followers, and feared for the displacement of Gothic paganism.

It was not until the later 4th century reigns of the augusti Gratian (r. 367–383), Valentinian II (r. 375–392), and Theodosius I (r. 379–395) that Christianity would become the official religion of the empire with the joint promulgation of the Edict of Thessalonica, establishing Nicene Christianity as the state religion and as the state church of the Roman Empire on 27 February 380. After this began state persecution of non-Nicene Christians, including Arian and Nontrinitarian devotees.

When Augustine became coadjutor Bishop of Hippo in 395, both Donatist and Catholic parties had, for decades, existed side-by-side, with a double line of bishops for the same cities, all competing for the loyalty of the people. (Note: French archaeology has shown the north African landscape of this time period became "covered with a white robe of churches" with Catholics and Donatists building multiple churches with granaries to feed the poor as they competed for the loyalty of the people.) Augustine was distressed by the ongoing schism, but he held the view that belief cannot be compelled, so he appealed to the Donatists using popular propaganda, debate, personal appeal, General Councils, appeals to the emperor and political pressure, but all attempts failed. The Donatists fomented protests and street violence, accosted travelers, attacked random Catholics without warning, often doing serious and unprovoked bodily harm such as beating people with clubs, cutting off their hands and feet, and gouging out eyes while also inviting their own martyrdom. By 408, Augustine supported the state's use of force against them. Historian Frederick Russell says that Augustine did not believe this would "make the Donatists more virtuous" but he did believe it would make them "less vicious".

Augustine wrote that there had, in the past, been ten Christian persecutions, beginning with the Neronian persecution, and alleging persecutions by the emperors Domitian, Trajan, "Antoninus" (Marcus Aurelius), "Severus" (Septimius Severus), and Maximinus (Thrax), as well as Decian and Valerianic persecutions, and then another by Aurelian as well as by Diocletian and Maximian. These ten persecutions Augustine compared with the 10 Plagues of Egypt in the Book of Exodus. (Note: Augustine, Civitate dei, XVIII.50: Latin: Proinde ne illud quidem temere puto esse dicendum siue credendum, quod nonnullis uisum est uel uidetur, non-amplius ecclesiam passuram persecutiones usque ad tempus Antichristi, quam quot iam passa est, id est decem, ut undecima eademque nouissima sit ab Antichristo. Primam quippe computant a Nerone quae facta est, secundam a Domitiano, a Traiano tertiam, quartam ab Antonino, a Seuero quintam, sextam a Maximino, a Decio septimam, octauam a Valeriano, ab Aureliano nonam, decimam a Diocletiano et Maximiano. Plagas enim Aegyptiorum, quoniam decem fuerunt, antequam exire inde inciperet populus Dei, putant ad hunc intellectum esse referendas, ut nouissima Antichristi persecutio similis uideatur undecimae plagae, qua Aegyptii, dum hostiliter sequerentur Hebraeos, in mari Rubro populo Dei per siccum transeunte perierunt.) Augustine did not see these early persecutions in the same light as that of fourth century heretics. In Augustine's view, when the purpose of persecution is to "lovingly correct and instruct", then it becomes discipline and is just. Augustine wrote that "coercion cannot transmit the truth to the heretic, but it can prepare them to hear and receive the truth". He said the church would discipline its people out of a loving desire to heal them, and that, "once compelled to come in, heretics would gradually give their voluntary assent to the truth of Christian orthodoxy." He opposed the severity of Rome and the execution of heretics.

It is his teaching on coercion that has literature on Augustine frequently referring to him as le prince et patriarche de persecuteurs (the prince and patriarch of persecutors). Russell says Augustine's theory of coercion "was not crafted from dogma, but in response to a unique historical situation" and is therefore context dependent, while others see it as inconsistent with his other teachings. His authority on the question of coercion was undisputed for over a millennium in Western Christianity, and according to Brown "it provided the theological foundation for the justification of medieval persecution."

==== Heraclian period ====
Callinicus I, initially a priest and skeuophylax in the Church of the Theotokos of Blachernae, became patriarch of Constantinople in 693 or 694. Having refused to consent to the demolition of a chapel in the Great Palace, the Theotokos ton Metropolitou, and having possibly been involved in the deposition and exile of Justinian II (r. 685–695, 705–711), an allegation denied by the Synaxarion of Constantinople, he was himself exiled to Rome on the return of Justinian to power in 705. The emperor had Callinicus immured. He is said to have survived forty days when the wall was opened to check his condition, though he died four days later.

=== Sassanian Empire ===
The first larger outbreak of violence against Christians happened under Vahran II. in the 270s. Later The killing of the so-called Edessan Martyrs Shoma, Guria and Habib extended to a persecution in the regions of Edessa between 306 and 310.

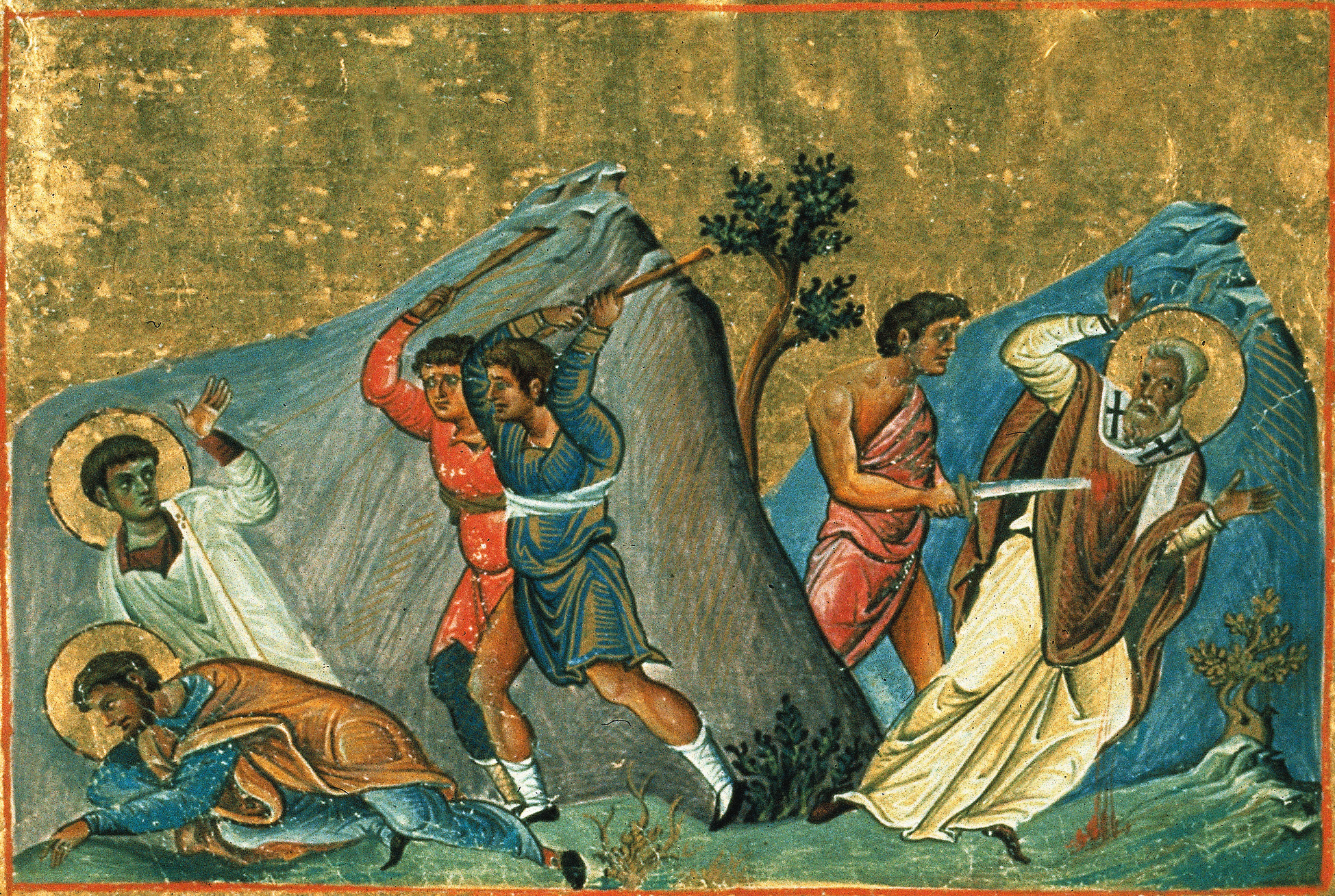
Martyrdom of Miles (bishop of Susa) by Shapur II of Persia from the Menologion of Basil II (c. 1000)

Violent persecutions of Christians began in earnest in the long reign of Shapur II (r. 309–379). A persecution of Christians at Kirkuk is recorded in Shapur's first decade, though most persecution happened after 341. At war with the Roman emperor Constantius II (r. 337–361), Shapur imposed a tax to cover the war expenditure, and Shemon Bar Sabbae, the Bishop of Seleucia-Ctesiphon, refused to collect it. Often citing collaboration with the Romans, the Persians began persecuting and executing Christians. Passio narratives describe the fate of some Christians venerated as martyrs; they are of varying historical reliability, some being contemporary records by eyewitnesses, others were reliant on popular tradition at some remove from the events. An appendix to the Syriac Martyrology of 411 lists the Christian martyrs of Persia, but other accounts of martyrs' trials contain important historical details on the workings of the Sassanian Empire's historical geography and judicial and administrative practices. Some were translated into Sogdian and discovered at Turpan.

Under Yazdegerd I (r. 399–420) there were occasional persecutions, including an instance of persecution in reprisal for the burning of a Zoroastrian fire temple by a Christian priest, and further persecutions occurred in the reign of Bahram V (r. 420–438). Under Yazdegerd II (r. 438–457) an instance of persecution in 446 is recorded in the Syriac martyrology Acts of Ādur-hormizd and of Anāhīd. Some individual martyrdoms are recorded from the reign of Khosrow I (r. 531–579), but there were likely no mass persecutions. While according to a peace treaty of 562 between Khosrow and his Roman counterpart Justinian I (r. 527–565), Persia's Christians were granted the freedom of religion; proselytism was, however, a capital crime. By this time the Church of the East and its head, the Catholicose of the East, were integrated into the administration of the empire and mass persecution was rare.

The Sassanian policy shifted from tolerance of other religions under Shapur I to intolerance under Bahram I and apparently a return to the policy of Shapur until the reign of Shapur II. The persecution at that time was initiated by Constantine's conversion to Christianity which followed that of Armenian king Tiridates in about 301. The Christians were thus viewed with suspicions of secretly being partisans of the Roman Empire. This did not change until the fifth century when the Church of the East broke off from the Church of the West. Zoroastrian elites continued viewing the Christians with enmity and distrust throughout the fifth century with threat of persecution remaining significant, especially during war against the Romans.

Zoroastrian high priest Kartir refers in his inscription dated about 280 on the Ka'ba-ye Zartosht monument in the Naqsh-e Rostam necropolis near Zangiabad, Fars, to persecution (zatan – "to beat, kill") of Christians ("Nazareans n'zl'y and Christians klstyd'n"). Kartir took Christianity as a serious opponent. The use of the double expression may be indicative of the Greek-speaking Christians deported by Shapur I from Antioch and other cities during his war against the Romans. Constantine's efforts to protect the Persian Christians made them a target of accusations of disloyalty to the Sasanians. With the resumption of Roman-Sasanian conflict under Constantius II, the Christian position became untenable. Zoroastrian priests targeted clergy and ascetics of local Christians to eliminate the leaders of the church. A Syriac manuscript in Edessa in 411 documents dozens executed in various parts of the western Sasanian Empire.

In 341, Shapur II ordered the persecution of all Christians, as a response to their supposed support of Romans. Shapur II doubled the tax on Christians, and Shemon Bar Sabbae informed him that he could not pay the taxes demanded from him and his community. Sabbae was martyred and a forty-year-long period of persecution against Christians began. The Council of Seleucia-Ctesiphon gave up choosing bishops since it would result in death. The local mobads – Zoroastrian clerics – with the help of satraps organized slaughters of Christians in Adiabene, Beth Garmae, Khuzistan and many other provinces.

Yazdegerd I showed tolerance towards Jews and Christians for much of his rule. He allowed Christians to practice their religion freely, demolished monasteries and churches were rebuilt and missionaries were allowed to operate freely. He reversed his policies during the later part of his reign however, suppressing missionary activities. Bahram V continued and intensified their persecution, resulting in many of them fleeing to the Eastern Roman Empire. Bahram demanded their return, beginning the Roman–Sasanian War of 421–422. The war ended with an agreement of freedom of religion for Christians in Iran with that of Mazdaism in Rome. Meanwhile, Christians suffered destruction of churches, renounced the faith, had their private property confiscated and many were expelled.

Yazdegerd II had ordered all his subjects to embrace Mazdaism in an attempt to unite his empire ideologically. The Caucasus rebelled to defend Christianity, which had become integrated into their local culture, with Armenian aristocrats turning to the Romans for help. The rebels were, however, defeated in a battle on the Avarayr Plain. Yeghishe, in his The History of Vardan and the Armenian War, pays tribute to the battles waged to defend Christianity. Another revolt was waged from 481 to 483, which was suppressed. However, the Armenians succeeded in gaining freedom of religion among other improvements.

Accounts of executions for apostasy of Zoroastrians who converted to Christianity during Sasanian rule proliferated from the fifth to early seventh century, and continued to be produced even after the collapse of the Sasanians. The punishment of apostates increased under Yazdegerd I and continued under successive kings. It was normative for apostates who were brought to the notice of authorities to be executed, although the prosecution of apostasy depended on political circumstances and Zoroastrian jurisprudence. Per Richard E. Payne, the executions were meant to create a mutually recognised boundary between interactions of the people of the two religions and to prevent one religion from challenging another's viability. Although the violence on Christians was selective and especially carried out on elites, it served to keep Christian communities in a subordinate and yet viable position in relation to Zoroastrianism. Christians were allowed to build religious buildings and serve in the government as long as they did not expand their institutions and population at the expense of Zoroastrianism.

Khosrow I was generally regarded as tolerant of Christians and interested in the philosophical and theological disputes during his reign. Sebeos says he had converted to Christianity on his deathbed. John of Ephesus describes an Armenian revolt, suggesting it erupted after Khusrow had attempted to impose Zoroastrianism in Armenia. However, the account is very similar to the one of the Armenian revolt of 451. In addition, Sebeos does not mention any religious persecution in his account of the revolt of 571. A story about Hormizd IV's tolerance is preserved by the historian al-Tabari. Upon being asked why he tolerated Christians, he replied, "Just as our royal throne cannot stand upon its front legs without its two back ones, our kingdom cannot stand or endure firmly if we cause the Christians and adherents of other faiths, who differ in belief from ourselves, to become hostile to us."

==== During the Byzantine–Sasanian War of 602–628 ====
Several months after the Persian conquest in AD 614, a riot occurred in Jerusalem, and the Jewish governor of Jerusalem Nehemiah was killed by a band of young Christians along with his "council of the righteous" while he was making plans for the building of the Third Temple. At this time, the Christians had allied themselves with the Eastern Roman Empire. Shortly afterward, the events escalated into a full-scale Christian rebellion, resulting in a battle against the Jews and Christians who were living in Jerusalem. In the battle's aftermath, many Jews were killed, and the survivors fled to Caesarea, which was still being held by the Persian army.

The Judeo-Persian reaction was ruthless: Persian Sasanian general Xorheam assembled Judeo-Persian troops; they marched to Jerusalem, set up an encampment around the city, and besieged it for 19 days. Eventually, digging beneath Jerusalem's foundations, they destroyed the wall, and on the 19th day of the siege, the Judeo-Persian forces took Jerusalem.

According to the account of the Armenian ecclesiastic and historian Sebeos, the siege resulted in a total Christian death toll of 17,000, the earliest and thus most commonly accepted figure. Per Strategius, following the conquest, between 4,518 and 66,509, Christians were massacred by Jews at the Mamilla Pool. Israeli archaeologist Ronny Reich estimates a death toll of 60,000 people before the Persian authorities put an end to the killing. In 1989, a mass burial grave at Mamilla cave was discovered by Israeli archeologist Ronny Reich, near the site where Strategius recorded the massacre took place. The human remains were in poor condition, containing a minimum of 526 individuals.

The eyewitness account of Strategius of St. Sabas narrates: "Jews ransomed the Christians from the hands of the Persian soldiers for good money, and slaughtered them with great joy at Mamilla Pool, and it ran with blood." The Sulha al-Quds, the treaty of Jerusalem's capitulation to Muslim forces in 638, can only be understood in the context of the massacre at Mamilla. In it, the Christian Patriarch Sophronius of Jerusalem required that the Arab ruler Umar protect the people of Jerusalem from the Jews. From the many excavations carried out in the Galilee, it is clear that all churches had been destroyed during the period between the Persian invasion and the Arab conquest in 637. The church at Shave Ziyyon was destroyed and burnt in 614, while the churches at Evron, Nahariya, 'Arabe, and the monastery of Shelomi shared a similarly tragic fate. The monastery at Kursi was damaged in the invasion.

=== Pre-Islamic Arabia ===
In AD 516, tribal unrest broke out in Yemen and several tribal elites fought for power. One of those elites was Joseph Dhu Nuwas or "Yūsuf Asʾar Yathʾar", a Jewish ruler of the Himyarite Kingdom whose name is written in ancient south Arabian inscriptions. Syriac and Byzantine Greek sources say that he fought his war because Christians in Yemen refused to renounce Christianity. In 2009, a documentary that aired on the BBC defended the statement that the villagers had been offered the choice between conversion to Judaism or death and 20,000 Christians were then massacred by stating that "The production team spoke to many historians over a period of 18 months, among them Nigel Groom, who was our consultant, and Professor Abdul Rahman Al-Ansary, a former professor of archaeology at the King Saud University in Riyadh."

Inscriptions which were documented by Yousef himself show the great pride that he expressed after he killed more than 22,000 Christians in Zafar and Najran. Historian Glen Bowersock described this massacre as a "savage pogrom that the Jewish king of the Arabs launched against the Christians in the city of Najran. The king himself reported in excruciating detail to his Arab and Persian allies about the massacres that he had inflicted on all Christians who refused to convert to Judaism."

== Early Middle Ages ==
=== Viking invasion of Europe ===
Viking invasions of European Anglo-Saxon land resulted in massacres and atrocities which pagan Vikings committed against Christians.

According to the Anglo-Saxon Chronicles, in 793, Viking raiders struck England and raided Lindisfarne, the monastery that held Saint Cuthbert's relics, killing the monks and capturing the valuables. The raid marked the beginning of the "Viking Age of Invasion".

In 793, the monastery on Lindisfarne, an island off England's eastern coast, was sacked by a Viking raiding party on 8 June and Christian priests and monks were massacred by Viking invaders.

Lo, it is nearly 350 years that we and our fathers have inhabited this most lovely land, and never before has such a terror appeared as we have now suffered from a pagan race, nor was it thought that such an inroad from the sea could be made. Behold the church of St Cuthbert spattered with the blood of the priests of God, despoiled of all its ornaments. Archbishop Alcuin of York on the sacking of Lindisfarne and massacre of Christians by Viking polytheist pagans.

==== Killing of Christians of Scotland by Vikings ====
The following year, pagan Vikings sacked the nearby Monkwearmouth–Jarrow Abbey. In 795, they launched another attack, this time, they raided the Iona Abbey, which was located on Scotland's west coast. This Christian monastery was attacked again in 802 and 806, when 68 Christian people who were living there were killed. After this devastating attack, the monastic community on Iona abandoned the site and fled to Kells in Ireland.

=== Caliphates ===
==== Rashidun Caliphate ====
Since they are considered "People of the Book" in the Islamic religion, Christians who lived under Muslim rule were relegated to the status of dhimmi (along with Jews, Samaritans, Gnostics, Mandeans, and Zoroastrians), which was inferior to the status of Muslims. Christians and other religious minorities thus faced religious discrimination and persecution because they were banned from proselytising (for Christians, it was forbidden to evangelize or spread Christianity) in the lands which were invaded by the Arab Muslims on pain of death, they were banned from bearing arms, they were banned from holding certain professions, and they were obligated to dress differently in order to distinguish themselves from Arabs and Muslims. Under the Islamic law (sharīʿa), Non-Muslims were obligated to pay the jizya and kharaj taxes, together with periodic and heavy ransom which was levied upon Christian communities by Muslim rulers in order to fund their military campaigns, all of which resulted in their contribution of a significant amount of their income to the Islamic states, leading to the empoverishment of many Christian communities, and these financial and social hardships forced many Christians to convert to Islam. Christians who were unable to pay these taxes were forced to surrender their children to the Muslim rulers, who would sell them as slaves to Muslim households, where they were forced to convert to Islam.

According to the tradition of the Syriac Orthodox Church, the Muslim conquest of the Levant was a relief for Christians oppressed by the Western Roman Empire. Michael the Syrian, patriarch of Antioch, wrote later that the Christian God had "raised from the south the children of Ishmael to deliver us by them from the hands of the Romans". Various Christian communities in the regions of Palestine, Syria, Lebanon, and Armenia resented either the governance of the Western Roman Empire or that of the Byzantine Empire, and therefore preferred to live under more favourable economic and political conditions as dhimmi under the Muslim rulers. However, modern historians also recognize that the Christian populations living in the lands invaded by the Arab Muslim armies between the 7th and 10th centuries AD suffered religious persecution, religious violence, and martyrdom multiple times at the hands of Arab Muslim officials and rulers; many were executed under the Islamic death penalty for defending their Christian faith through dramatic acts of resistance such as refusing to convert to Islam, repudiation of the Islamic religion and subsequent reconversion to Christianity, and blasphemy towards Muslim beliefs.

When Amr ibn al-As conquered Tripoli in 643, he forced the Jewish and Christian Berbers to give their wives and children as slaves to the Arab army as part of their jizya.

Around the year 666 C.E., Uqba ibn Nafi "conquered the southern Tunisian cities... slaughtering all the Christians living there." Muslim sources report him waging countless raids, often ending with the complete ransacking and mass enslavement of cities.

Archaeological evidence from North Africa in the region of Cyrenaica points to the destruction of churches along the route the Islamic conquerors followed in the late seventh century, and the remarkable artistic treasures buried along the routes leading to the North of Spain by fleeing Visigoths and Hispano-Romans during the early eighth century consist largely of religious and dynastic paraphernalia that the Christian inhabitants obviously wanted to protect from Muslim looting and desecration.

==== Umayyad Caliphate ====
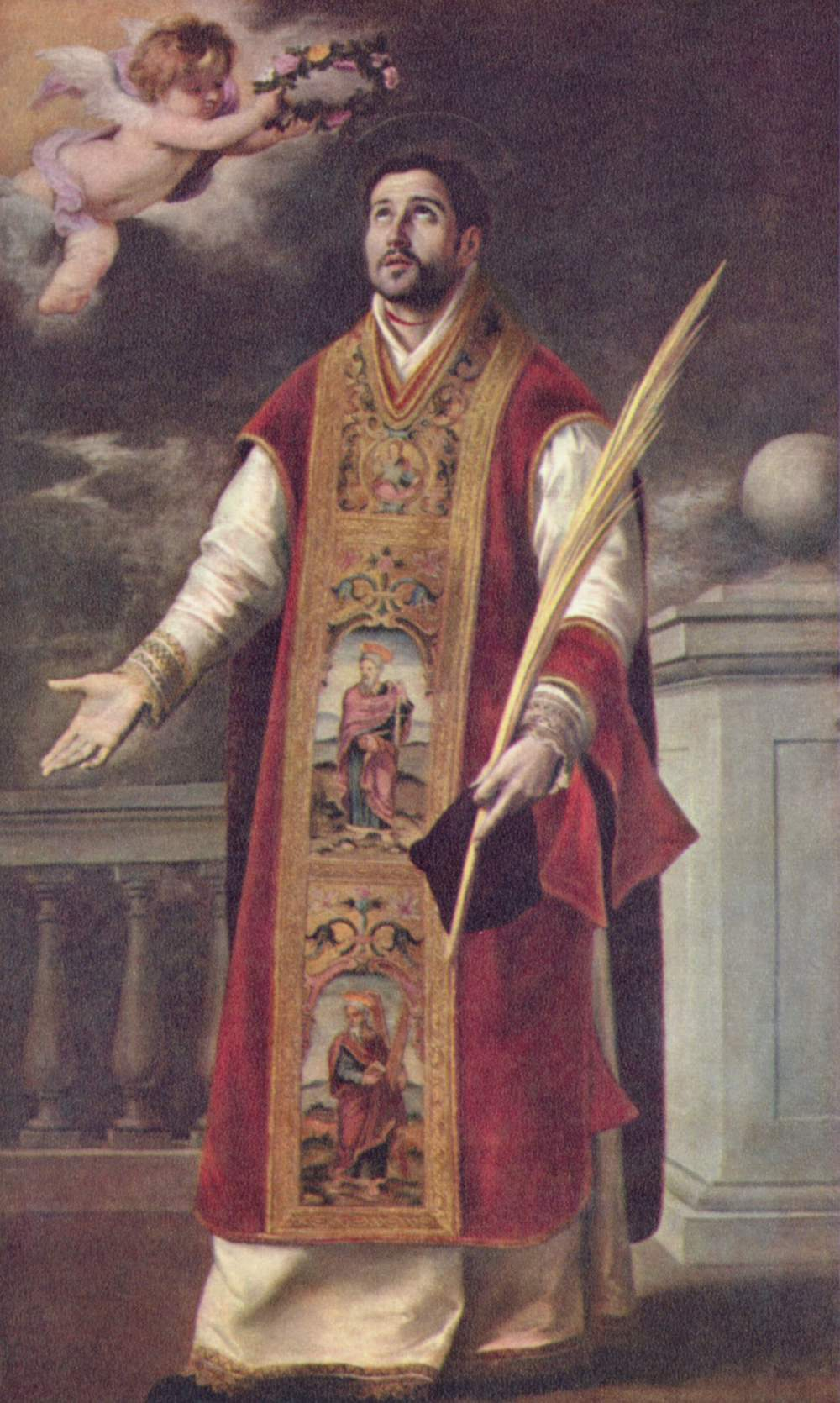
Roderick is venerated as one of the Martyrs of Córdoba

According to the Ḥanafī school of Islamic law (sharīʿa), the testimony of a Non-Muslim (such as a Christian or a Jew) was not considered valid against the testimony of a Muslim in legal or civil matters. Historically, in accordance with Islamic culture and in accordance with traditional Islamic law, Muslim women have been forbidden from marrying Christian or Jewish men, whereas Muslim men have been permitted to marry Christian or Jewish women (see: Interfaith marriage in Islam). Christians under Islamic rule had the right to convert to Islam or any other religion, while conversely a murtad, or an apostate from Islam, faced severe penalties or even hadd, which could include the death penalty.

In general, Christians who lived under Islamic rule were allowed to practice their religion with some notable limitations which stemmed from the apocryphal Pact of Umar. This treaty, supposedly enacted in 717 AD, forbade Christians from publicly displaying the cross on church buildings, forbade them from summoning congregants to prayer by ringing bells, forbade them from re-building or repairing churches and monasteries after they had been destroyed or damaged, and imposed other restrictions which forbade them from practicing certain occupations, forced them to wear different clothing, and forbade them from possessing certain weapons. The Umayyad Caliphate persecuted many Berber Christians in the 7th and 8th centuries AD, who slowly converted to Islam.

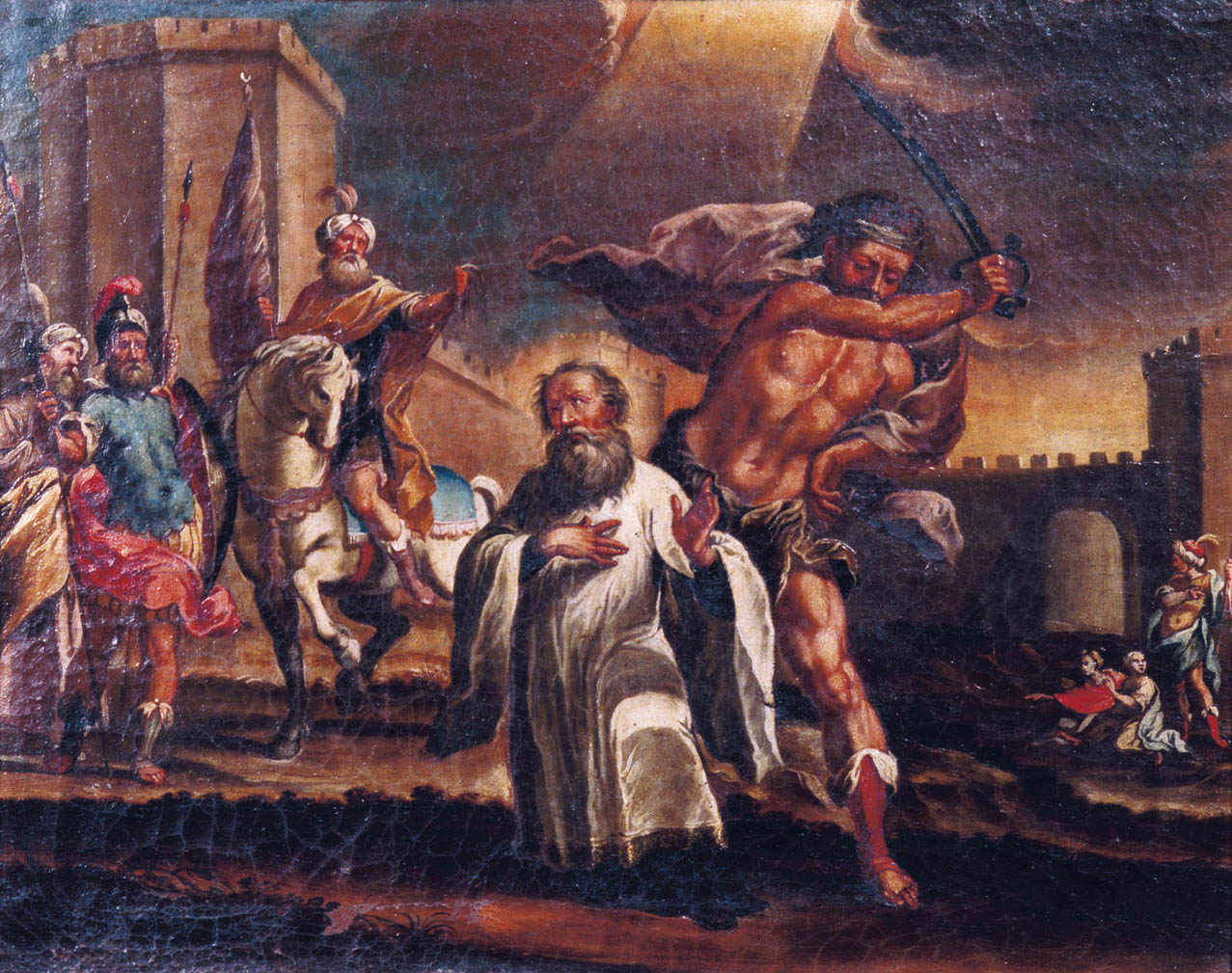
Martyrdom of Saint Eulogius of Cordova, at Cordova cathedral

In Umayyad al-Andalus (the Iberian Peninsula), the Mālikī school of Islamic law was the most prevalent. The martyrdom of forty-eight Christians who were executed in the Emirate of Córdoba between 850 and 859 AD is documented in the hagiographical treatise which was written by the Iberian Christian and the Latinist scholar Eulogius of Córdoba. The Martyrs of Córdoba were executed under the rule of Abd al-Rahman II and Muhammad I, and Eulogius' hagiography describes in detail the executions of the martyrs for capital violations of Islamic law, including apostasy and blasphemy.

After the Arab conquests, a number of Christian Arab tribes were enslaved and forcibly converted to Islam. In the early eighth century under the Umayyads, 63 out of a group of 70 Christian pilgrims from Iconium were captured, tortured, and executed under the orders of the Arab Governor of Ceaserea for refusing to convert to Islam (seven were forcibly converted to Islam under torture). Soon afterwards, sixty more Christian pilgrims from Amorium were crucified in Jerusalem.

==== Almoravid Caliphate ====
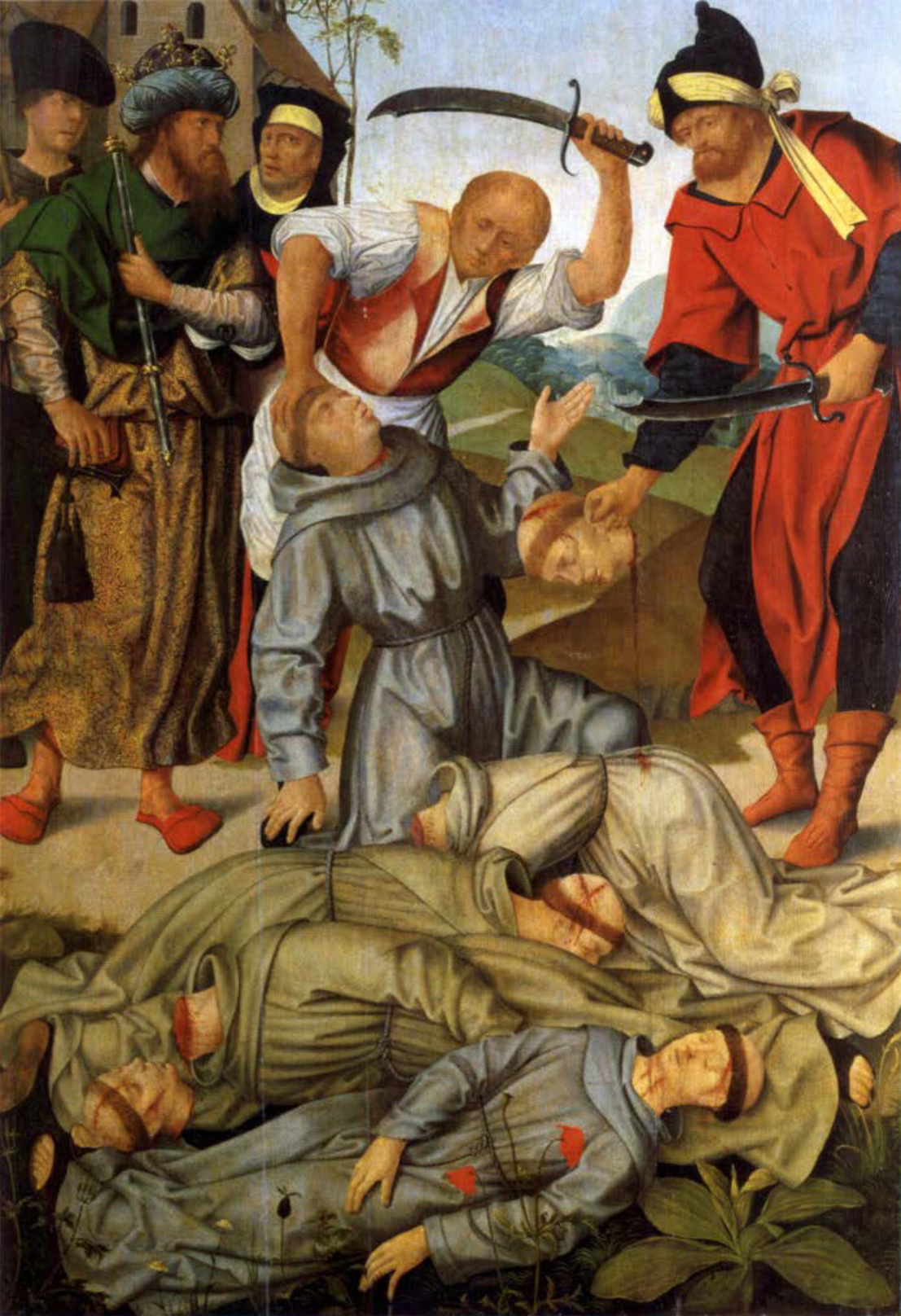
The Holy Martyrs of Morocco, 1508, by Francisco Henriques (National Museum of Ancient Art, Lisbon)

The Almohads wreaked enormous destruction on the Christian population of Iberia. Tens of thousands of the native Christians in Iberia (Hispania) were deported from their ancestral lands to Africa by the Almoravids and Almohads. They suspected that the Christians could pose as a fifth column that could potentially help their coreligionists in the north of Iberia. Many Christians died en route to north Africa during these expulsions. Christians under the Almoravids suffered persecutions and mass expulsions to Africa. In 1099 the Almoravids sacked the great church of the city of Granada. In 1101 Christians fled from the city of Valencia to the Catholic kingdoms. In 1106 the Almoravids deported Christians from Malaga to Africa. In 1126, after a failed Christian rebellion in Granada, the Almoravids expelled the city's entire Christian population to Africa. And in 1138, Ibn Tashufin forcibly took many thousands of Christians with him to Africa.

The oppressed Mozarabs sent emissaries to the king of Aragon, Alphonso 1st le Batailleur (1104–1134), asking him to come to their rescue and deliver them from the Almoravids. Following the raid the king of Aragon launched in Andalusia in 1125–26 in responding to the pleas of Grenada's Mozarabs, the latter were deported en masse to Morocco in the fall of 1126. Another wave of expulsions to Africa took place 11 years later and as a result very very few Christians were left in Andalusia. Whatever was left of the Christian Catholic population in Granada was exterminated in the aftermath of a revolt against the Almohads in 1164. The Caliph Abu Yaqub Yusuf boasted that he had left no church or synagogue standing in al-Andalus.

Muslim clerics in Al Andalus viewed Christians and Jews as unclean and dirty and feared that too much contact with them would contaminate Muslims. In Seville the faqih Ibn Abdun issued these regulations segregating people of the two faiths:

A Muslim must not massage a Jew or a Christian nor throw away his refuse nor clean his latrines. The Jew and the Christian are better fitted for such trades, since they are the trades of those who are vile. A Muslim should not attend to the animal of a Jew or of a Christian, nor serve him as a muleteer [neither Catholics nor Jews could ride horses; only Muslims could], nor hold his stirrup. If any Muslim is known to do this, he should be denounced.… No … [unconverted] Jew or Christian must be allowed to dress in the costume of people of position, of a jurist, or of a worthy man [this provision echoes the Pact of Umar]. They must on the contrary be abhorred and shunned and should not be greeted with the formula, "Peace be with you," for the devil has gained mastery over them and has made them forget the name of God. They are the devil's party, "and indeed the devil's party are the losers" (Qur'an 57:22). They must have a distinguishing sign by which they are recognized to their shame [emphasis added].

==== Abbasid Caliphate ====
The Abbasid Caliphate was less tolerant of Christianity than had been the Umayyad caliphs. Nonetheless, Christian officials continued to be employed in the government, and the Christians of the Church of the East were often tasked with the translation of Ancient Greek philosophy and Greek mathematics. The writings of al-Jahiz attacked Christians for being too prosperous, and indicates they were able to ignore even those restrictions placed on them by the state. In the late 9th century, the patriarch of Jerusalem, Theodosius, wrote to his colleague the patriarch of Constantinople Ignatios that "they are just and do us no wrong nor show us any violence".

Elias of Heliopolis, having moved to Damascus from Heliopolis (Ba'albek), was accused of apostasy from Christianity after attending a party held by a Muslim Arab, and was forced to flee Damascus for his hometown, returning eight years later, where he was recognized and imprisoned by the "eparch", probably the jurist al-Layth ibn Sa'd. After refusing to convert to Islam under torture, he was brought before the Damascene emir and relative of the caliph al-Mahdi (r. 775–785), Muhammad ibn-Ibrahim, who promised good treatment if Elias would convert. On his repeated refusal, Elias was tortured and beheaded and his body burnt, cut up, and thrown into the river Chrysorrhoes (the Barada) in 779 AD.

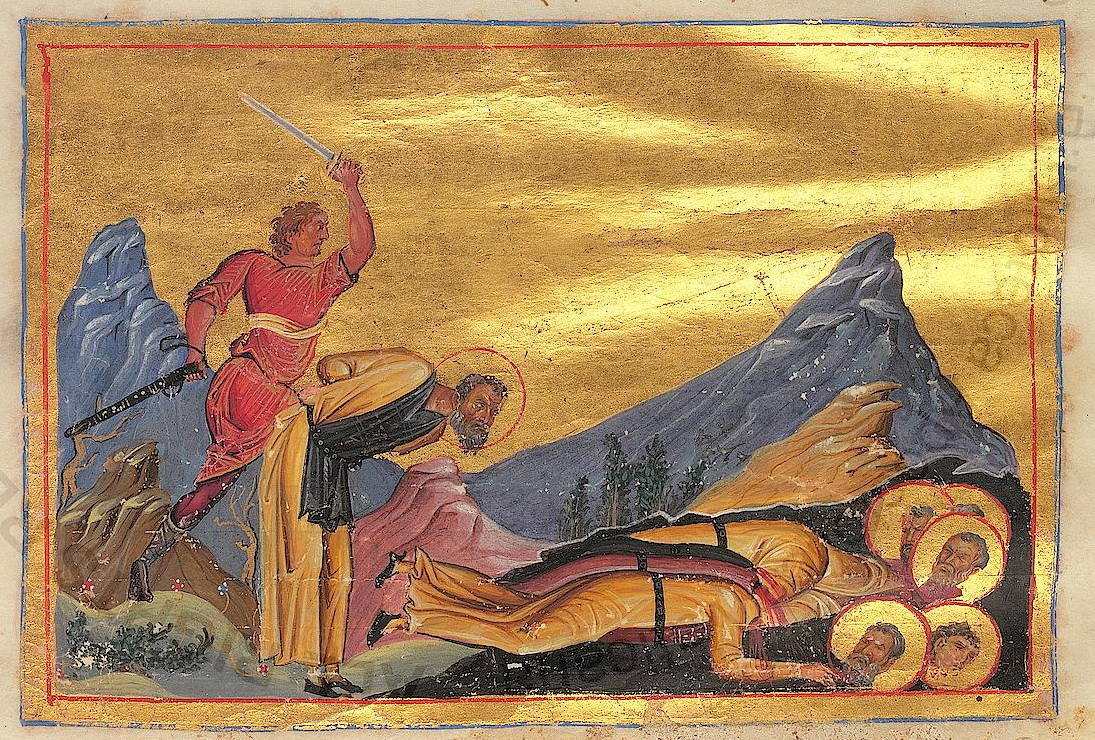
Raid on the Monastery of Zobe and the death of hegumenos Michael and his 36 brothers, depicted in the Menologion of Basil II.

According to the Synaxarion of Constantinople, the hegumenos Michael of Zobe and thirty-six of his monks at the Monastery of Zobe near Sebasteia (Sivas) were killed by a raid on the community. The perpetrator was the "emir of the Hagarenes", "Alim", probably Ali ibn-Sulayman, an Abbasid governor who raided Roman territory in 785 AD. Bacchus the Younger was beheaded in Jerusalem in 786–787 AD. Bacchus was Palestinian, whose family, having been Christian, had been converted to Islam by their father. Bacchus however, remained crypto-Christian and undertook a pilgrimage to Jerusalem, upon which he was baptized and entered the monastery of Mar Saba. Reunion with his family prompted their reconversion to Christianity and Bacchus's trial and execution for apostasy under the governing emir Harthama ibn A'yan.

After the 838 Sack of Amorium, the hometown of the emperor Theophilos (r. 829–842) and his Amorian dynasty, the caliph al-Mu'tasim (r. 833–842) took more than forty Roman prisoners. These were taken to the capital, Samarra, where after seven years of theological debates and repeated refusals to convert to Islam, they were put to death in March 845 under the caliph al-Wathiq (r. 842–847). Within a generation they were venerated as the 42 Martyrs of Amorium. According to their hagiographer Euodius, probably writing within a generation of the events, the defeat at Amorium was to be blamed on Theophilos and his iconoclasm. According to some later hagiographies, including one by one of several Middle Byzantine writers known as Michael the Synkellos, among the forty-two were Kallistos, the doux of the Koloneian thema, and the heroic martyr Theodore Karteros.

During the 10th-century phase of the Arab–Byzantine wars, the victories of the Romans over the Arabs resulted in mob attacks on Christians, who were believed to sympathize with the Roman state. According to Bar Hebraeus, the catholicus of the Church of the East, Abraham III (r. 906–937), wrote to the grand vizier that "we Nestorians are the friends of the Arabs and pray for their victories". The attitude of the Nestorians "who have no other king but the Arabs", he contrasted with the Greek Orthodox Church, whose emperors he said "had never cease to make war against the Arabs. Between 923 and 924, several Orthodox churches were destroyed in mob violence in Ramla, Ascalon, Caesarea Maritima, and Damascus. In each instance, according to the Arab Melkite Christian chronicler Eutychius of Alexandria, the caliph al-Muqtadir (r. 908–932) contributed to the rebuilding of ecclesiastical property.

During the late 700s in the Abbasid Empire, Muslims destroyed two churches and a monastery near Bethlehem and slaughtered its monks. In 796, Muslims burned another twenty monks to death. In the years 809 and 813 AD, multiple monasteries, convents, and churches were attacked in and around Jerusalem; both male and female Christians were gang raped and massacred. In 929, on Palm Sunday, another wave of atrocities broke out; churches were destroyed and Christians slaughtered. al-Maqrizi records that in the year 936, "the Muslims in Jerusalem made a rising and burnt down the Church of the Resurrection [the Holy Sepulchre] which they plundered, and destroyed all they could of it".

According to the Synaxarion of Constantinople, Dounale-Stephen, having journeyed to Jerusalem, continued his pilgrimage to Egypt, where he was arrested by the local emir and, refusing to relinquish his beliefs, died in jail c. 950.

When Abd Allah ibn Tahir went to besiege Kaisum, the fortress of Nasr: "There had been great oppression in the whole country because the inhabitants [christian dhimmis] were forced to bring provisions to the camp; and in every place it was a time of famine and a dearth of all sorts of things." In order to rotect themselves from their attackers cannons, Nasr ibn Shabath and his Arab troops used a stratagem that had already been tried at the siege of Balis (using Christian women and children as human shields): they forced Christian women and their children to mount the walls so that they were exposed as targets for the Persians. Nasr used the same tactics at the second siege of Kaisum.

=== Byzantine Empire ===
George Limnaiotes, a monk on Mount Olympus known only from the Synaxarion of Constantinople and other synaxaria, was supposed to have been 95 years old when he was tortured for his iconodulism. In the reign of Leo III the Isaurian (r. 717–741), he was mutilated by rhinotomy and his head burnt.

Germanus I of Constantinople, a son of the patrikios Justinian, a courtier of the emperor Heraclius (r. 610–641), having been castrated and enrolled in the cathedral clergy of Hagia Sophia when his father was executed in 669, was later bishop of Cyzicus and then patriarch of Constantinople from 715. In 730, in the reign of Leo III (r. 717–741), Germanus was deposed and banished, dying in exile at Plantanion (Akçaabat). Leo III also exiled the monk John the Psichaites, an iconodule, to Cherson, where he remained until after the emperor's death.

According only to the Synaxarion of Constantinople, the clerics Hypatios and Andrew from the Thracesian thema were, during the persecution of Leo III, brought to the capital, jailed and tortured. The Synaxarion says that they had the embers of burnt icons applied to their heads, subjected to other torments, and then dragged though the Byzantine streets to their public execution in the area of the city's VIIth Hill, the so-called Medieval Greek: ξηρόλοφος, romanized: Xērólophos, lit. 'dry hill' near the Forum of Arcadius.

Andrew of Crete was beaten and imprisoned in Constantinople after having debated with the iconoclast emperor Constantine V (r. 741–775), possibly in 767 or 768, and then abused by the Byzantines as he was dragged through the city, dying of blood loss when a fisherman cut off his foot in the Forum of the Ox. The church of Saint Andrew in Krisei was named after him, though his existence is doubted by scholars.

Having defeated and killed the emperor Nikephoros I (r. 802–811) at the Battle of Pliska in 811, the First Bulgarian Empire's khan, Krum, also put to death a number of Roman soldiers who refused to renounce Christianity, though these martyrdoms, known only from the Synaxarion of Constantinople, may be entierely legendary. In 813 the Bulgarians invaded the thema of Thrace, led by Krum, and the city of Adrianople (Edirne) was captured. Krum's successor Dukum died shortly after Krum himself, being succeeded by Ditzevg, who killed Manuel the archbishop of Adrianople in January 815. According to the Synaxarion of Constantinople and the Menologion of Basil II, Ditzevg's own successor Omurtag killed some 380 Christians later that month. The victims included the archbishop of Develtos, George, and the bishop of Thracian Nicaea, Leo, as well as two strategoi called John and Leo. Collectively these are known as the Martyrs of Adrianople.

The Byzantine monk Makarios, of the Pelekete Monastery in Bithynia, having already refused an enviable position at court offered by the iconoclast emperor Leo IV the Khazar (r. 775–780) in return for the repudiation of his iconodulism, was expelled from the monastery by Leo V the Armenian (r. 813–820), who also imprisoned and exiled him. The patriarch Nikephoros I of Constantinople dissented from the iconoclast Council of Constantinople of 815 and was exiled by Leo V as a result. He died in exile in 828.

In spring 816, the Constantinopolitan monk Athanasios of Paulopetrion was tortured and exiled for his iconophilism by the emperor Leo V. In 815, during the reign of Leo V, having been appointed hegoumenos of the Kathara Monastery in Bithynia by the emperor Nikephoros I, John of Kathara was exiled and imprisoned first in Pentadactylon, a stronghold in Phrygia, and then in the fortress of Kriotauros in the Bucellarian thema. In the reign of Michael II he was recalled, but exiled again under Theophilos, being banished to Aphousia (Avşa) where he died, probably in 835.

Eustratios of Agauros, a monk and hegumenos of the Agauros Monastery at the foot of Mount Trichalikos, near Prusa's Mount Olympus in Bithynia, was forced into exile by the persecutions of Leo V and Theophilos (r. 829–842). Leo V and Theophilos also persecuted and exiled Hilarion of Dalmatos, the son of Peter the Cappadocian, who had been made hegumenos of the Dalmatos Monastery by the patriarch Nikephoros I. Hilarion was allowed to return to his post only in the regency of Theodora. The same emperors also persecuted Michael Synkellos, an Arab monk of the Mar Saba monastery in Palestine who, as the syncellus of the patriarch of Jerusalem, had travelled to Constantinople on behalf of the patriarch Thomas I. On the Triumph of Orthodoxy, Michael declined the ecumenical patriarchate and became instead the hegumenos of the Chora Monastery.

According to Theophanes Continuatus, the Armenian monk and iconographer of Khazar origin Lazarus Zographos refused to cease painting icons in the second official iconoclast period. Theophilos had him tortured and his hands burned with heated irons, though he was released at the intercession of the empress Theodora and hidden at the Monastery of John the Baptist tou Phoberou, where he was able to paint an image of the patron saint. After the death of Theophilos, and the Triumph of Orthodoxy, Lazarus re-painted the representation of Christ on the Chalke Gate of the Great Palace of Constantinople.

Symeon Stylites of Lesbos was persecuted for his iconodulism in the second period of official iconoclasm. He was imprisoned and exiled, returning to Lesbos only after the vernation of icons was restored in 842. The bishop George of Mytilene, who may have been Symeon's brother, was exiled from Constantinople in 815 on account of his iconophilia. He spent the last six years of his life in exile on an island, probably one of the Princes' Islands, dying in 820 or 821. George's relics were taken to Mytilene to be venerated after the restoration of iconodulism to orthodoxy under the patriarch Methodios I, during which the hagiography of George was written.

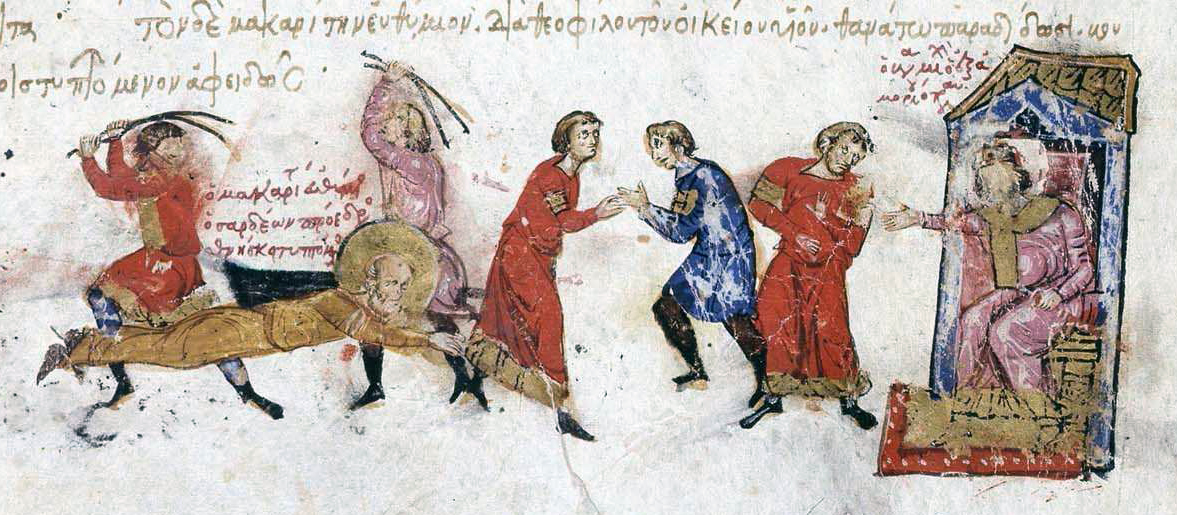
Miniature depicting the execution of the patriarch Euthymius of Sardis under the Byzantine Emperor Michael II, from an illuminated manuscript of the Madrid Skylitzes (12th century).

The bishop Euthymius of Sardis was the victim of several iconoclast Christian persecutions. Euthymius had previously been exiled to Pantelleria by the emperor Nikephoros I (r. 802–811), recalled in 806, led the iconodule resistance against Leo V (r. 813–820), and exiled again to Thasos in 814. After his recall to Constantinople in the reign of Michael II (r. 820–829), he was again imprisoned and exiled to Saint Andrew's Island, off Cape Akritas (Tuzla, Istanbul). According to the hagiography of by the patriarch Methodios I of Constantinople, who said he shared Euthymius's exile and been present at his death, Theoktistos and two other imperial officials personally whipped Euthymius to death on account of his iconodulism; Theoktistos was active in the persecution of iconodules under the iconoclast emperors, but later championed the iconodule cause. Theoktistos was later venerated as a saint in the Eastern Orthodox Church, listed in the Synaxarion of Constantinople. The last of the iconoclast emperors, Theophilos (r. 829–842), was posthumously rehabilitated by the iconodule Orthodox Church on the intervention of his wife Theodora, who says he had had a deathbed conversion to iconodulism in the presence of Theoktistos and had given 60 Byzantine pounds of gold to each of his victims in his will. The rehabilitation of the iconoclast emperor was a precondition of his widow for convoking the Council of Constantinople in March 843, at which the veneration of icons was restored to orthodoxy and which became celebrated as the Triumph of Orthodoxy.

Evaristos, a relative of Theoktistos Bryennios and a monk of the Monastery of Stoudios, was exiled to the Thracian Chersonese (Gallipoli peninsula) for his support of his hegumenos Nicholas and his patron the patriarch Ignatios of Constantinople when the latter was deposed by Photios I in 858. Both Nicholas and Evaristos went into exile. Only after many years was Evaristos allowed to return to Constantinople to found a monastery of his own. The hegumenos Nicholas, who had accompanied Evaristos to the Chersonese, was restored to his post at the Stoudios Monastery. A partisan of Ignatios of Constantinople and a refugee from the Muslim conquest of Sicily, the monk Joseph the Hymnographer was banished to Cherson from Constantinople on the elevation of Ignatios's rival Photios in 858. Only after the end of Photios's patriarchate was Joseph allowed to return to the capital and become the cathedral skeuophylax of Hagia Sophia.

Euthymius, a monk, senator, and synkellos favored by Leo VI (r. 870–912), was first made a hegumenos and then in 907 patriarch of Constantinople by the emperor. When Leo VI died and Nicholas Mystikos was recalled to the patriarchal throne, Euthymius was exiled.

== High Middle Ages (1000–1200) ==
=== Fatimid Caliphate ===
The caliph al-Hakim bi-Amr Allah (r. 996–1021) engaged in a persecution of Christians. Al-Hakim was "half-insane", and had perpetrated the only general persecution of Christians by Muslims until the Crusades. Al-Hakim's mother was a Christian, and he had been raised mainly by Christians, and even through the persecution al-Hakim employed Christian ministers in his government. Between 1004 and 1014, the caliph produced legislation to confiscate ecclesiastical property and burn crosses; later, he ordered that small mosques be built atop church roofs, and later still decreed that churches were to be burned. The caliph's Jewish and Muslim subjects were subjected to similarly arbitrary treatment. As part of al-Hakim's persecution, thirty thousand churches were reportedly destroyed, and in 1009 the caliph ordered the demolition of the Church of the Holy Sepulchre in Jerusalem, on the pretext that the annual Holy Fire miracle on Easter was a fake. The persecution of al-Hakim and the demolition of the Church of the Holy Sepulchre prompted Pope Sergius IV to issue a call for soldiers to expel the Muslims from the Holy Land, while European Christians engaged in a retaliatory persecution of Jews, whom they conjectured were in some way responsible for al-Hakim's actions. In the second half of the eleventh century, pilgrims brought home news of how the rise of the Turks and their conflict with the Egyptians increased the persecution of Christian pilgrims.

In 1013, at the intervention of the emperor Basil II (r. 960–1025), Christians were given permission to leave Fatimid territory. In 1016 however, the caliph was proclaimed divine, alienating his Muslim subjects by banning the hajj and the fast of ramadan, and causing him to again favor the Christians. In 1017, al-Hakim issued an order of toleration regarding Christians and Jews, while the following year confiscated ecclesiastical property was returned to the Church, including the construction materials seized by the authorities from demolished buildings.

In 1027, the emperor Constantine VIII (r. 962–1028) concluded a treaty with Salih ibn Mirdas, the emir of Aleppo, allowing the emperor to repair the Church of the Holy Sepulchre and permitting the Christians forced to convert to Islam under al-Hakim to return to Christianity. Though the treaty was re-confirmed in 1036, actual building on the shrine began only in the later 1040s, under the emperor Constantine IX Monomachos (r. 1042–1055). According to al-Maqdisi, the Christians seemed largely in control of the Holy Land, and the emperor himself was rumored, according to Nasir Khusraw, to have been among the many Christian pilgrims that came to the Holy Sepulchre.

=== Seljuk Empire ===
Sultan Alp Arslan pledged: "I shall consume with the sword all those people who venerate the cross, and all the lands of the Christians shall be enslaved." Alp Arslan ordered the Turks:

Henceforth all of you be like lion cubs and eagle young, racing through the countryside day and night, slaying the Christians and not sparing any mercy on the Roman nation

It was said that "the emirs spread like locusts, over the face of the land," invading every corner of Anatolia, sacking some of ancient Christianity's most important cities, including Ephesus, home of Saint John the Evangelist; Nicaea, where Christendom's creed was formulated in 325; and Antioch, the original see of Saint Peter, and enslaved many. According to French historian J. Laurent, hundreds of thousands of the native Anatolian Christians were reported to have been massacred or enslaved during the invasions of Anatolia by the Seljuk Turks.

Destruction and desecration of Churches became very widespread during the Turkic invasions of Anatolia which caused enormous damage to the ecclesiastical foundations throughout Asia minor:

Even before the battle of Manzikert, Turkish raids resulted in the pillaging of the famous churches of St. Basil at caesareia and of the Archangel Michael at Chonae. In the decade following 1071 the destruction of churches and the flight of the clergy became widespread. churches were often pillaged and destroyed. The churches of St. Phocas in Sinope and Nicholas at Myra, both important centers of pilgrimage, were destroyed. The monasteries of Mt. Latrus, Strobilus, and elanoudium on the western coast were sacked and the monks driven out during the early invasions, so that the monastic foundations in this area were completely abandoned until the Byzantine reconquest and the extensive support of successive Byzantine emperors once more reconstituted them. Greeks were forced to surround the church of St. John at Ephesus with walls to protect it from the Turks. The disruption of active religious life in the Cappadocian cave-monastic communies is also indicated for the twelfth century.

News of the great tribulation and persecutions of the eastern Christians reached European Christians in the west in the few years after the battle of Manzikert. A Frankish eyewitness says: "Far and wide they [Muslim Turks] ravaged cities and castles together with their settlements. Churches were razed down to the ground. Of the clergyman and monks whom they captured, some were slaughtered while others were with unspeakable wickedness given up, priests and all, to their dire dominion and nuns—alas for the sorrow of it!—were subjected to their lusts." In a letter to count Robert of Flanders, Byzantine emperor Alexios I Komnenos writes:

The holy places are desecrated and destroyed in countless ways. Noble matrons and their daughters, robbed of everything, are violated one after another, like animals. Some [of their attackers] shamelessly place virgins in front of their own mothers and force them to sing wicked and obscene songs until they have finished having their ways with them... men of every age and description, boys, youths, old men, nobles, peasants and what is worse still and yet more distressing, clerics and monks and woe of unprecedented woes, even bishops are defiled with the sin of sodomy and it is now trumpeted abroad that one bishop has succumbed to this abominable sin.

In a poem, Malik Danishmend boasts: "I am Al Ghazi Danishmend, the destroyer of churches and towers". Destruction and pillaging of churches figure prominently in his poem. Another part of the poem talks about the simultaneous conversion of 5,000 people to Islam and the murder of 5,000 others.

Michael the Syrian wrote: "As the Turks were ruling the lands of Syria and Palestine, they inflicted injuries on Christians who went to pray in Jerusalem, beat them, pillaged them, and levied the poll tax [jizya]. Every time they saw a caravan of Christians, particularly of those from Rome and the lands of Italy, they made every effort to cause their death in diverse ways". Such was the fate German pilgrimage to Jerusalem in 1064. According to one of the surviving pilgrims:

Accompanying this journey was a noble abbess of graceful body and of a religious outlook. Setting aside the cares of the sisters committed to her and against the advice of the wise, she undertook this great and dangerous pilgrimage. The pagans captured her, and the sight of all, these shameless men raped her until she breathed her last, to the dishonor of all Christians. Christ's enemies performed such abuses and others like them on the christians.

=== Crusades ===
After the Seljuks invaded Anatolia and the Levant, every Anatolian village they controlled along the route to Jerusalem began exacting tolls on Christian pilgrims. In principle the Seljuks allowed Christian pilgrims access to Jerusalem, but they often imposed huge ransoms and condoned local attacks against Christians. Many pilgrims were seized and sold into slavery while others were tortured (seemingly for entertainment). Soon only very large, well-armed and wealthy groups would dare attempt a pilgrimage, and even so, many died and many more turned back. The pilgrims that survived these extremely dangerous journeys, "returned to the West weary and impoverished, with a dreadful tale to tell."

In the year 1064, 7,000 pilgrims led by Bishop Gunther of Bamberg were ambushed by Muslims near Caesarea Maritima, and two-thirds of the pilgrims were slaughtered.

In the Middle Ages, the crusades were promoted as defensive response of Christianity against persecution of Eastern Christianity in the Levant. Western Catholic contemporaries believed the First Crusade was a movement against Muslim attacks on Eastern Christians and Christian sites in the Holy Land. In the mid-11th century, relations between the Byzantine Empire and the Fatimid Caliphate and between Christians and Muslims were peaceful, and there had not been persecution of Christians since the death of al-Hakim bi-Amr Allah. As a result of the migration of Turkic peoples into the Levant and the Seljuk Empire's wars with the Fatimid Caliphate in the later 11th century, reports of Christian pilgrims increasingly mentioned persecution of Christians there. Similarly, accounts sent to the West of the Byzantines' medieval wars with various Muslim states alleged persecutions of Christians and atrocities against holy places. Western soldiers were encouraged to take up soldiering against the empire's Muslim enemies; a recruiting bureau was even established in London. After the 1071 Battle of Manzikert, the sense of Byzantine distress increased and Pope Gregory VII suggested that he himself would ride to the rescue at the head of an army, saying Christians were being "slaughtered like cattle". In the 1090s, the emperor Alexios I Komnenos (r. 1081–1118) issued appeals for help against the Seljuks to western Europe. In 1091 his ambassadors told the king of Croatia Muslims were destroying sacred sites, while his letter to Robert I, Count of Flanders, deliberately described emotively the rape and maltreatment of Christians and the sacrilege of the Jerusalem shrines.

Pope Urban II, who convoked the First Crusade at the 1095 Council of Clermont, spoke of the defense of his co-religionists in the Levant and the protection of the Christian holy places, while ordinary crusaders are also known to have been motivated by the notion of persecution of Christians by Muslims. According to Fulcher of Chartres, the pope described his holy wars as being contra barbaros, 'against the barbarians', while the pope's own letters indicate that the Muslims were barbarians fanatically persecuting Christians. The same idea, expressed in similar language, was evident in the writings of the bishop Gerald of Cahors, the abbot Guibert of Nogent, the priest Peter Tudebode, and the monk Robert of Reims. Outside the clergy, the Gesta Francorum's author likewise described the Crusaders' opponents as persecuting barbarians, language not used for non-Muslim non-Christians. These authors, together with Albert of Aix and Baldric of Dol, all referred to the Arabs, Saracens, and Turks as barbarae nationes, 'barbarian races'. Peter the Venerable, William of Tyre, and The Song of Roland all took the view that Muslims were barbarians, and in calling for the Third Crusade, Pope Gregory VIII expounded on the Muslim threat from Saladin, accusing the Muslims of being "barbarians thirsting for the blood of Christians". In numerous instances Pope Innocent III called on the Catholics to defend the Holy Land in a holy war against the impugnes barbariem paganorum, 'attacks of the pagan barbarians'. Crusaders believed that by fighting off the Muslims, the persecution of Christians would abate, in accordance to their god's will, and this ideology – much promoted by the Crusader-era propagandists – was shared at every level of literate medieval western European society.

According to Guibert of Nogent, a Catholic writer, the persecution suffered by the Eastern Christians and the attacks on the empire by the Turks were caused by the Christians' own doctrinal errors. He said that "Since they deviate from faith in the Trinity, so that hitherto they who are in filth become filthier, gradually they have come to the final degradation of having taken paganism upon themselves as the punishment for the sin proceeding from this, they have lost the soil of their native land to invading foreigners ...". Western Christians considered the Byzantine position in the filioque controversy to be heresy and akin to Arianism; Guibert said that heresy was an Eastern practice, almost unknown in the Latin West. Further blame was attached to the Eastern Christians by the crusaders for the Crusade of 1101's defeats in Asia Minor; Alexios Komnenos was accused of having collaborated with the Turks to attack the crusaders. The Norman prince Bohemond, citing the supposed transgressions of the emperor and the Eastern Church, which the pope had declared heretic and whose doctrinal errors Bohemond blamed on Alexios, seized the Muslim-held and formerly Byzantine city of Antioch (Antakya) for himself after the Siege of Antioch and subsequent Battle of Antioch left Kerbogha defeated, becoming Bohemond I of the Principality of Antioch. This contravention of the agreement to return conquered lands to the emperor's control, was justified in the crusaders' letter to Pope Urban II by the statement that the Greek Christians were heretics. Later, Bohemond took the opportunity of a crusade to attack Dyrrachium (Durrës), justifying his attack on the Christians in a letter to Pope Paschal II enumerating Alexios's faults and blaming him for the East–West Schism and for having taken the imperial throne by force. Besides Guibert, other crusader writers to accuse Eastern Christians of sabotaging the crusade include Raymond of Aguilers, Albert of Aix, Baldric of Dol, and the author of the Gesta Francorum. Alexios's departure from the crusade, followed by the departure of his envoy Tatikios, was seen as proof of the Eastern Christians' treachery. Though Fulcher of Chartres displayed a positive assessment of Eastern Christianity, he too accused the emperor of attacking Christian pilgrims, and of being a "tyrant".

When First Crusade's Siege of Jerusalem ended successfully for the crusaders, the patriarchate of Jerusalem was vacant, and the crusaders elevated a Latin patriarch without reference to either the Roman Catholic or the Eastern Orthodox churches. An Orthodox candidate for the patriarchate was forced to flee to Constantinople. Only when Saladin's Siege of Jerusalem was concluded and the city was returned to Muslim control were the Orthodox Christians allowed to practise in the Church of the Holy Sepulchre.

Crusade scholars continue to debate crusading, its causes, and its effects, so scholarship in this field repeatedly undergoes revision and reconsideration. Many early crusade scholars saw the source-histories as simple recitations of how events actually transpired, but by the eighteenth and nineteenth centuries, scholarship was increasingly skeptical of that assumption. By 1935, Carl Erdmann published Die Entstehung des Kreuzzugsgedankens (The Origin of the Idea of Crusade), changing the direction of crusader studies more than any other single work by focusing on the ideology of crusade. This ideology indicated the crusades were essentially defensive, which meant that soldiers were there to provide protection for pilgrims and fellow Christians in the East and to reclaim formerly Christian lands lost to Islamic expansion and forced conversion. This ideology remained throughout the Middle Ages despite the failure to finalize these goals. Constable adds that those "scholars who see the crusades as the beginning of European colonialism and expansionism would have surprised people at the time. Crusaders would not have denied some selfish aspects... but the predominant emphasis was on the defense and recovery of lands that had once been Christian and on the self-sacrifice rather than the self-seeking of the participants".

Historian Robert Irwin points out that "Christians living under Muslim rule suffered during the crusading period. They were suspected of acting as spies or fifth columns for the Franks and later the Mongols as well." According to Coptic chronicles, Saladin had many Christians in Egypt crucified in revenge against his Crusader enemies.

In 1951, Steven Runciman, a Byzantinist who saw the crusades in terms of east–west relations, wrote in the conclusion of his crusade history, that the "Holy War was nothing more than a long act of intolerance". Giles Constable says it is this view of the crusades that is most common among the populace. The problem with this view, according to political science professor Andrew R. Murphy, is that such concepts as intolerance were not part of eleventh century thinking about relationships for any of the various groups involved in or affected by the crusades, neither the Latins, the Byzantines, the Turks, the Baybars, nor others. Instead, concepts of tolerance began to grow during the crusades from efforts to define legal limits and the nature of co-existence, and these ideas grew among both Christians and Muslims.

These wars produced multiple massacres perpetrated by both sides. According to Mary Jane Engh's definition of religious persecution, which identifies it as "the repressive action initiated or condoned by authorities against their own people on religious grounds," it is not possible to term these acts of war as religious persecution.

After the collapse of the Kingdom of Jerusalem and the Fall of Acre, the last of the Crusaders' possessions in Asia in 1291, one of the main Christian military orders was suppressed from 1307 on trumped-up charges by the papacy. The Knights Templar were accused of sodomy, heresy, and corruption and the members were persecuted. In the crusades waged against non-Muslims, including Christians described as heretics, Catholic participants were promised the same spiritual rewards as were believed to be received by those who fought against Muslims in the Holy Land.

==== Albigensian Crusade ====
Pope Innocent III, with the king of France, Philip Augustus, began the military campaign known as the Albigensian Crusade between 1209 and 1226 against other Christians known as Cathars. Scholars disagree, using two distinct lines of reasoning, on whether the war that followed was religious persecution from the Pope or a land grab by King Philip. Historian Laurence W. Marvin says the Pope exercised "little real control over events in Occitania". Four years after the Massacre at Beziers in 1213, the Pope cancelled crusade indulgences and called for an end to the campaign. The campaign continued anyway. The Pope was not reversed until the Fourth Lateran council re-instituted crusade status two years later in 1215; afterwards, the Pope removed it yet again. The campaign continued in what Marvin refers to as "an increasingly murky moral atmosphere" for the next 16 years: there was technically no longer any crusade, no indulgences or dispensational rewards for fighting it, the papal legates exceeded their orders from the Pope, and the army occupied lands of nobles who were in the good graces of the church. The Treaty of Paris that ended the campaign left the Cathars still in existence, but awarded rule of Languedoc to Louis' descendants.

==== Northern (Baltic) crusades ====
The Northern (or Baltic crusades), went on intermittently from 1147 to 1316, and the primary trigger for these wars was not religious persecution but instead was the noble's desire for territorial expansion and material wealth in the form of land, furs, amber, slaves, and tribute. The princes wanted to subdue these pagan peoples and stop their raiding by conquering and converting them, but ultimately, Iben Fonnesberg-Schmidt says, the princes were motivated by their desire to extend their power and prestige, and conversion was not always an element of their plans. When it was, conversion by these princes was almost always as a result of conquest, either by the direct use of force or indirectly when a leader converted and required it of his followers as well. "While the theologians maintained that conversion should be voluntary, there was a widespread pragmatic acceptance of conversion obtained through political pressure or military coercion." The Church's acceptance of this led some commentators of the time to endorse and approve it, something Christian thought had never done before.

=== Ilkhanate ===
Bar Hebraeus provided this contemporary assessment of the Mongols attitudes toward their Christian subjects after their conversion to Islam: "And having seen very much modesty and other habits of this kind among Christian people, certainly the Mongols loved them greatly at the beginning of their kingdom, a time ago somewhat short. But their love hath turned to such intense hatred that they cannot even see them with their eyes approvingly, because they have all alike become Muslims". Things became worse when the khan, Mahmud Ghazan, (who converted to Islam in 1295) yielded to "popular pressure which compelled him to persecute Christians," and culminated in the following ordinance: "The churches shall be uprooted, and the altars overturned, and the celebrations of the Eucharist shall cease, and the hymns of praise, and the sounds of calls to prayer shall be abolished; and the heads of the Christians, and the heads of the congregations of the Jews, and the great men among them, shall be killed".

Empowered by this ordinance and believing "that everyone who did not abandon Christianity and deny his faith should be killed," Muslim mobs ran amok, slaughtering and wreaking havoc among Christian populations. In Armenia, church services were banned and local authorities ordered to tattoo a black mark on the shoulder of every male Christian and to pluck out the beards and inflict other humiliations on every Christian man. "When few Christians defected [to Islam] in response to these measures, the Khan then ordered that all Christian men be castrated and have one eye put out which caused many deaths in this era before antibiotics, but did lead to many conversions" to Islam.

The consideration which the Mongols bestowed on the Christians (particularly the Nestorians) singled them out for the hatred of the Muslims. In 1261, Muslims of Mosul pillaged and killed all those who did not convert to Islam. Several monks and community leaders and others from the common people recanted.

== Late Middle Ages ==
=== Western Europe ===
Advocates of lay piety called for church reform and met with persecution from the Popes. John Wycliffe (1320–1384) urged the church to give up ownership of property, which produced much of the church's wealth, and to once again embrace poverty and simplicity. He urged the church to stop being subservient to the state and its politics. He denied papal authority. John Wycliff died of a stroke, but his followers, called Lollards, were declared heretics. After the Oldcastle rebellion many were killed.

Jan Hus (1369–1415) accepted some of Wycliff's views and aligned with the Bohemian Reform movement which was also rooted in popular piety. In 1415, Hus was called to the Council of Constance where his ideas were condemned as heretical and he was handed over to the state and burned at the stake.

The Fraticelli, who were also known as the "Little Brethren" or "Spiritual Franciscans", were dedicated followers of Saint Francis of Assisi. These Franciscans honored their vow of poverty and saw the wealth of the Church as a contributor to corruption and injustice when so many lived in poverty. They criticized the worldly behavior of many churchmen. Thus, the Brethren were declared heretical by John XXII (1316–1334) who was called "the banker of Avignon".

The leader of these brethren, Bernard Délicieux (c. 1260–1270 – 1320) was well known as he had spent much of his life battling the Dominican-run inquisitions. He confessed, after torture and threat of excommunication, to the charge of opposing the inquisitions, and was defrocked and sentenced to life in prison, in chains, in solitary confinement, and to receive nothing but bread and water. The judges attempted to ameliorate the harshness of this sentence due to his age and frailty, but Pope John XXII countermanded them and delivered the friar to Inquisitor Jean de Beaune. Délicieux died shortly thereafter in early 1320.

=== Mamluk Sultanate ===
when Sultan Baybars took Antioch from the Crusaders he wrote a letter to Christians boasting of the atrocities they would have seen his soldiers commit had they been there:

You would have seen your knights prostrate beneath the horses' hooves, your houses stormed by pillagers and ransacked by looters, your wealth weighed by the quintal, your women sold four at a time and bought for a dinar of your own money! You would have seen the crosses in your churches smashed, the pages of the false Testaments scattered, the Patriarchs' tombs overturned. You would have seen your Muslim enemy trampling on the place where you celebrate the Mass, cutting the throats of monks, priests and deacons upon the altars, bringing sudden death to the Patriarchs and slavery to the royal princes. You would have seen fire running through your palaces, your dead burned in this world before going down to the fires of the next, your palace lying unrecognizable, the Church of St. Paul and that of the Cathedral of St. Peter pulled down and destroyed; then you would have said, "Would that I were dust, and that no letter had ever brought me such tidings!"

=== Timurid Empire ===
Timur (Tamerlane) instigated large scale massacres of Christians in Mesopotamia, Persia, Asia Minor and Syria in the 14th century AD. Most of the victims were indigenous Assyrians and Armenians, members of the Assyrian Church of the East and Orthodox Churches, which led to the decimation of the hitherto majority Assyrian population in northern Mesopotamia and the abandonment of the ancient Assyrian city of Assur. Tamerlane virtually exterminated the Church of the East, which had previously been a major branch of Christianity but afterwards became largely confined to a small area now known as the Assyrian Triangle.

== Early modern period ==
=== Protestant Reformation and Counter-Reformation ===
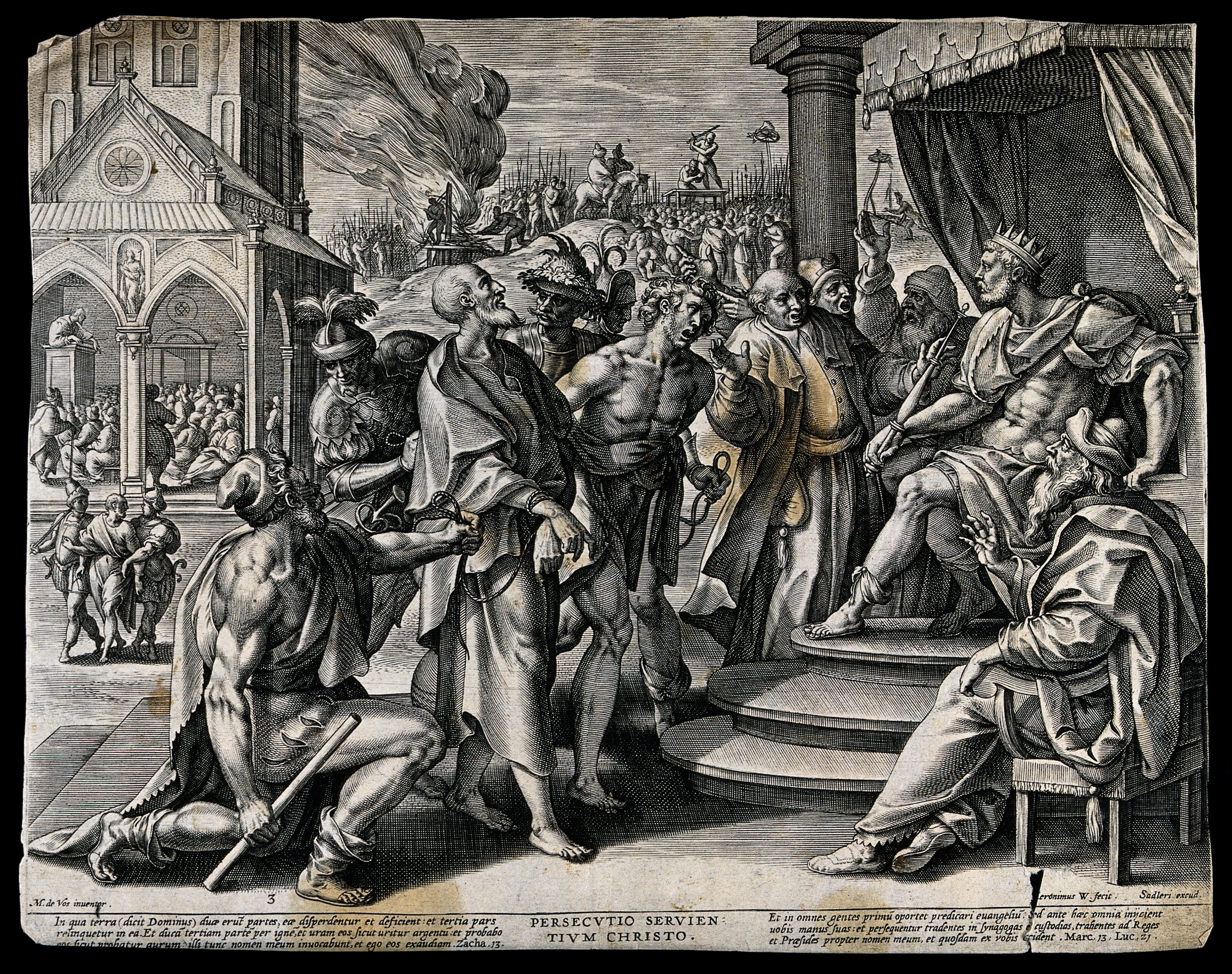
Persecution of the Servants of Christ by Maerten de Vos and engraved by Hieronymus Wierix (Wellcome Library). An illustration of the prophecy of persecution made during the Sermon on the Mount according to the Gospel of Luke. "But before all these, they shall lay their hands on you, and persecute you, delivering you up to the synagogues, and into prisons, being brought before kings and rulers for my name's sake." (Note: (Koine Greek: πρὸ δὲ τούτων πάντων ἐπιβαλοῦσιν ἐφ' ὑμᾶς τὰς χεῖρας αὐτῶν καὶ διώξουσιν, παραδιδόντες εἰς τὰς συναγωγὰς καὶ φυλακάς, ἀπαγομένους ἐπὶ βασιλεῖς καὶ ἡγεμόνας ἕνεκεν τοῦ ὀνόματός μου·))

The Protestant Reformation and the Roman Catholic Counter-Reformation provoked a number of persecutions of Christians by other Christians and the European wars of religion, including the Eighty Years' War, the French Wars of Religion, the Thirty Years' War, the Wars of the Three Kingdoms, the Savoyard–Waldensian wars, and the Toggenburg War. There were false allegations of witchcraft and numerous witch trials in the early modern period.

=== China ===
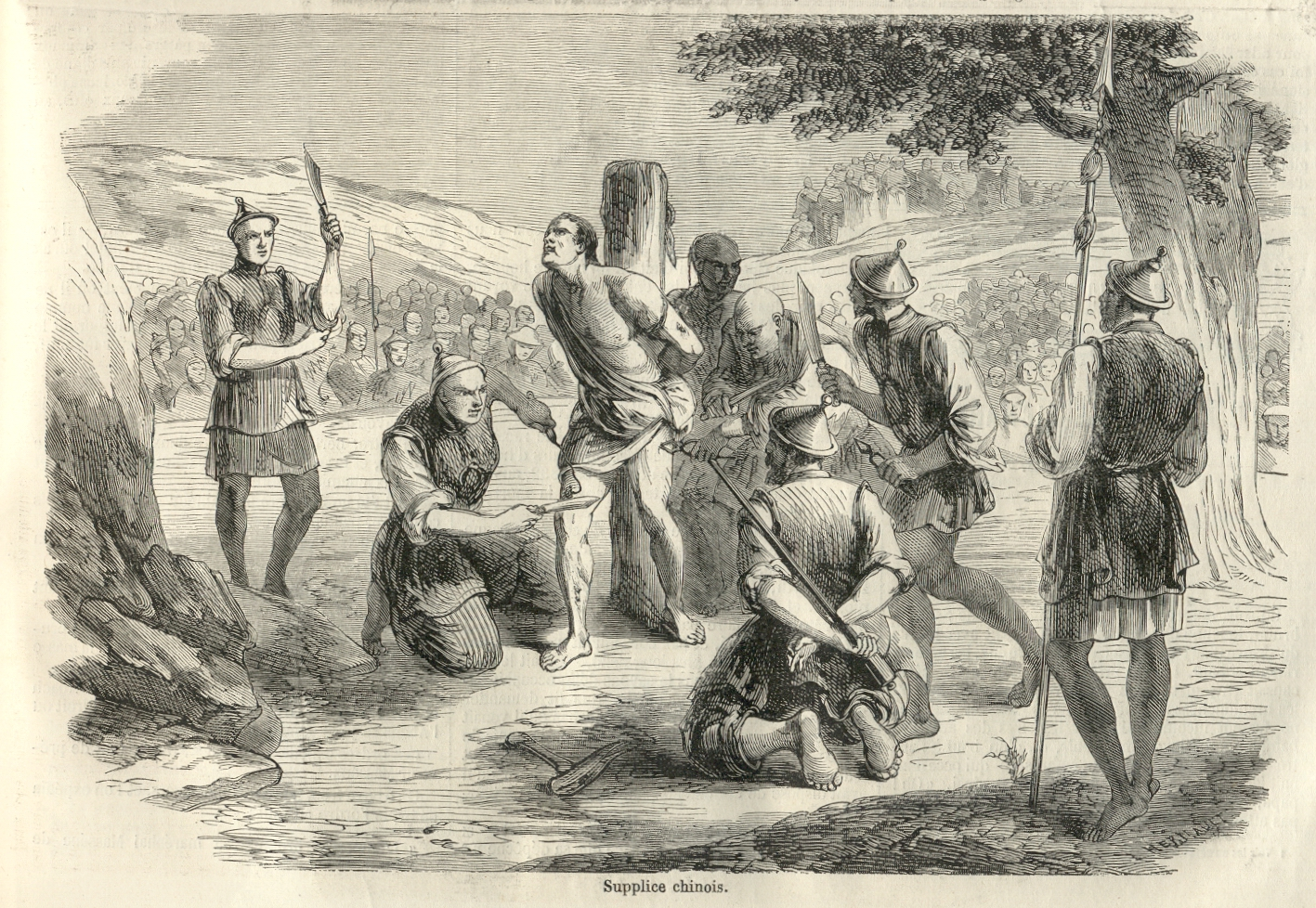
An 1858 illustration from the French newspaper, Le Monde Illustré, of the torture and execution of Father Auguste Chapdelaine, a French missionary in China, by slow slicing (lingchi).

Beginning in the late 17th century and for at least a century, Christianity was banned in China by the Kangxi Emperor of the Qing dynasty after Pope Clement XI forbade Chinese Catholics from venerating their relatives, Confucius, the Buddha or Guanyin.

The Boxer rebellion targeted foreign and Chinese Christians. Beginning in 1899, Boxers spread violence across Shandong and the North China Plain, attacking or murdering Christian missionaries and Chinese Christians. They decided the "primary devils" were the Christian missionaries, and the "secondary devils" were the Chinese converts to Christianity. Both had to recant or be driven out or killed. Boxers burned Christian churches, killed Chinese Christians and intimidated Chinese officials who stood in their way. Orthodox, Protestant, and Catholic missionaries and their Chinese parishioners were massacred throughout northern China, some by Boxers and others by government troops and authorities. Yuxian implemented a brutal anti-foreign and anti-Christian policy. The Baptist Missionary Society, based in England, opened its mission in Shanxi in 1877. In 1900 all its missionaries there were killed, along with all 120 converts. By the summer's end, more foreigners and as many as 2,000 Chinese Christians had been put to death in the province. Journalist and historical writer Nat Brandt has called the massacre of Christians in Shanxi "the greatest single tragedy in the history of Christian evangelicalism." During the Boxer Rebellion as a whole, a total of 136 Protestant missionaries and 53 children were killed, and 47 Catholic priests and nuns, 30,000 Chinese Catholics, 2,000 Chinese Protestants, and 200 to 400 of the 700 Russian Orthodox Christians in Beijing were estimated to have been killed. Collectively, the Protestant dead were called the China Martyrs of 1900.

The Muslim unit Kansu Braves which was serving in the Chinese army attacked Christians.

During the Northern Expedition, the Kuomintang incited anti-foreign, anti-Western sentiment. Portraits of Sun Yat-sen replaced the crucifix in several churches, KMT posters proclaimed that "Jesus Christ is dead. Why not worship something alive such as Nationalism?" Foreign missionaries were attacked and anti-foreign riots broke out. In 1926, Muslim General Bai Chongxi attempted to drive out foreigners in Guangxi, attacking American, European, and other foreigners and missionaries, and generally making the province unsafe for foreigners. Westerners fled from the province, and some Chinese Christians were also attacked as imperialist agents.

From 1894 to 1938, many Uighur Muslims converted to Christianity. They were killed, tortured and jailed. Christian missionaries were expelled.

=== French Revolution ===
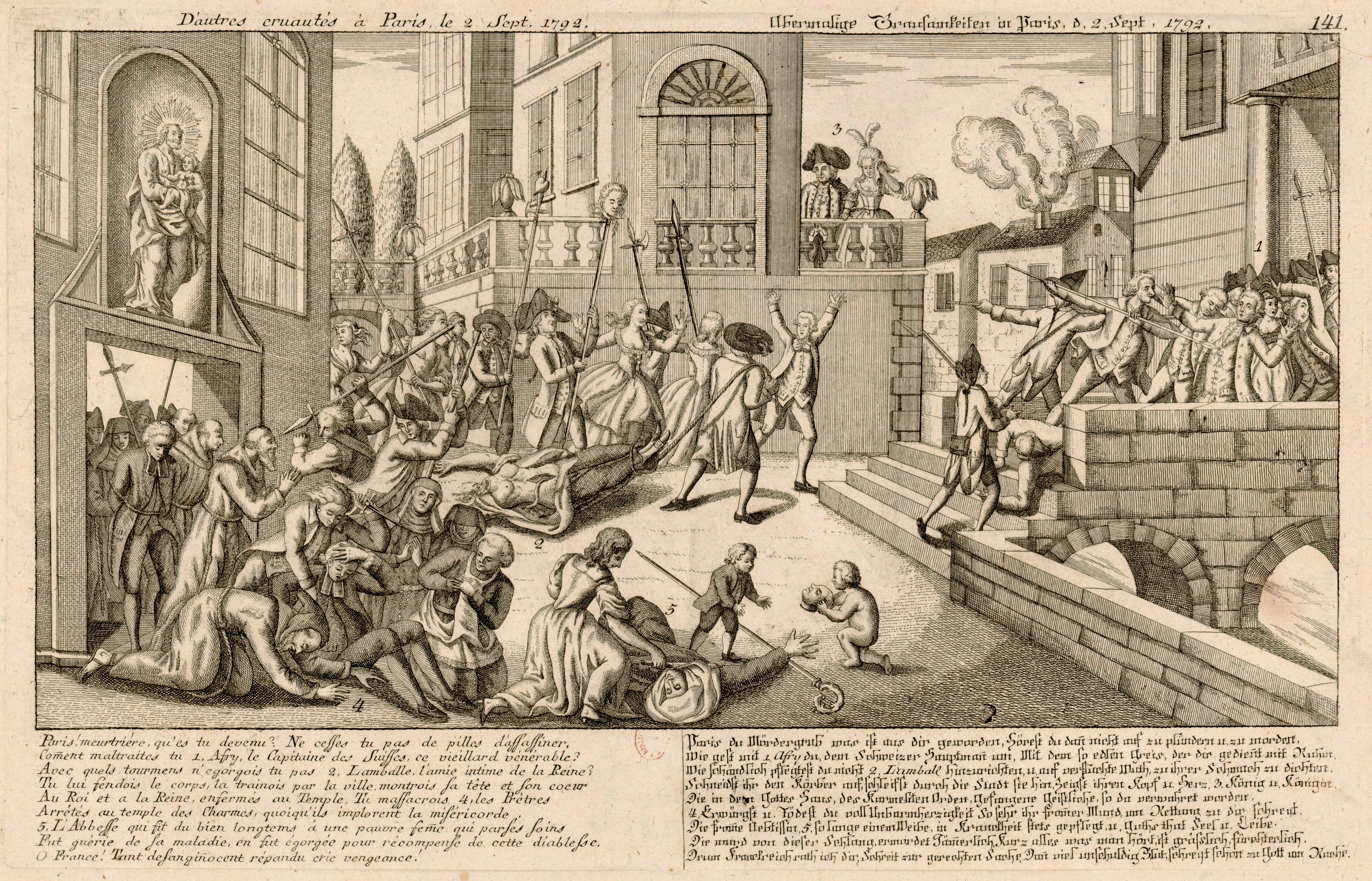
September massacres, 1792

The dechristianisation of France during the French Revolution is a conventional description of a campaign, conducted by various Robespierre-era governments of France beginning with the start of the French Revolution in 1789, to eliminate any symbol that might be associated with the past, especially the monarchy.

The program included the following policies:

- the deportation of clergy and the condemnation of many of them to death,
- the closing, desecration and pillaging of churches, removal of the word "saint" from street names and other acts to banish Christian culture from the public sphere
- removal of statues, plates, and other iconography from places of worship
- destruction of crosses, bells and other external signs of worship
- the institution of revolutionary and civic cults, including the Cult of Reason and subsequently the Cult of the Supreme Being,
- the large-scale destruction of religious monuments,
- the outlawing of public and private worship and religious education,
- forced marriages of the clergy,
- forced abjuration of priesthood, and
- the enactment of a law on 21 October 1793 making all nonjuring priests and all persons who harbored them liable to death on sight.

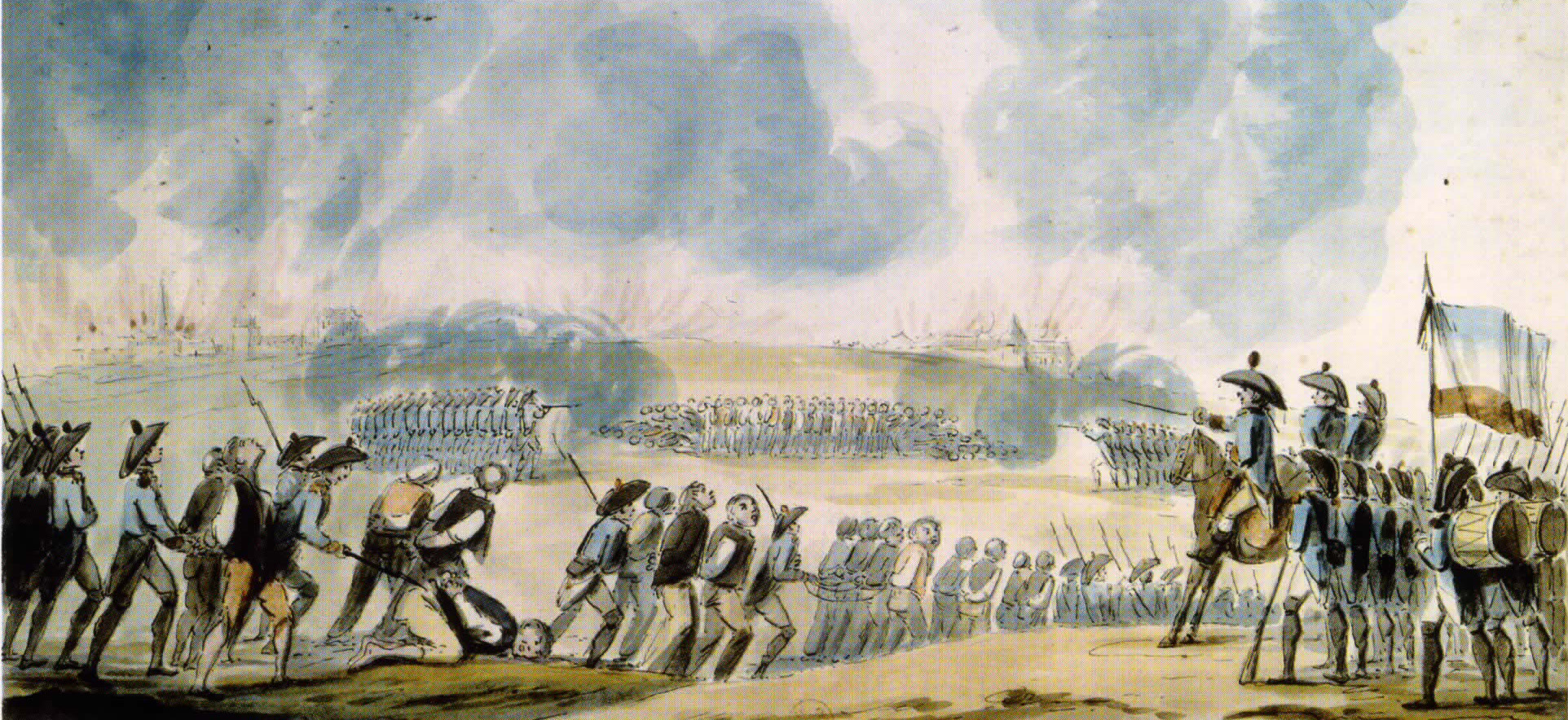
Mass shootings at Nantes, 1793

The climax was reached with the celebration of the Goddess "Reason" in Notre-Dame de Paris, the Parisian cathedral, on 10 November.

Under threat of death, imprisonment, military conscription or loss of income, about 20,000 constitutional priests were forced to abdicate or hand over their letters of ordination and 6,000 – 9,000 were coerced to marry, many ceasing their ministerial duties. Some of those who abdicated covertly ministered to the people. By the end of the decade, approximately 30,000 priests were forced to leave France, and thousands who did not leave were executed. Most of France was left without the services of a priest, deprived of the sacraments and any nonjuring priest faced the guillotine or deportation to French Guiana.

The March 1793 conscription requiring Vendeans to fill their district's quota of 300,000 enraged the populace, who took up arms as "The Catholic Army", "Royal" being added later, and fought for "above all the reopening of their parish churches with their former priests."

With these massacres came formal orders for forced evacuation; also, a 'scorched earth' policy was initiated: farms were destroyed, crops and forests burned and villages razed. There were many reported atrocities and a campaign of mass killing universally targeted at residents of the Vendée regardless of combatant status, political affiliation, age or gender. By July 1796, the estimated Vendean dead numbered between 117,000 and 500,000, out of a population of around 800,000.

=== Japan ===
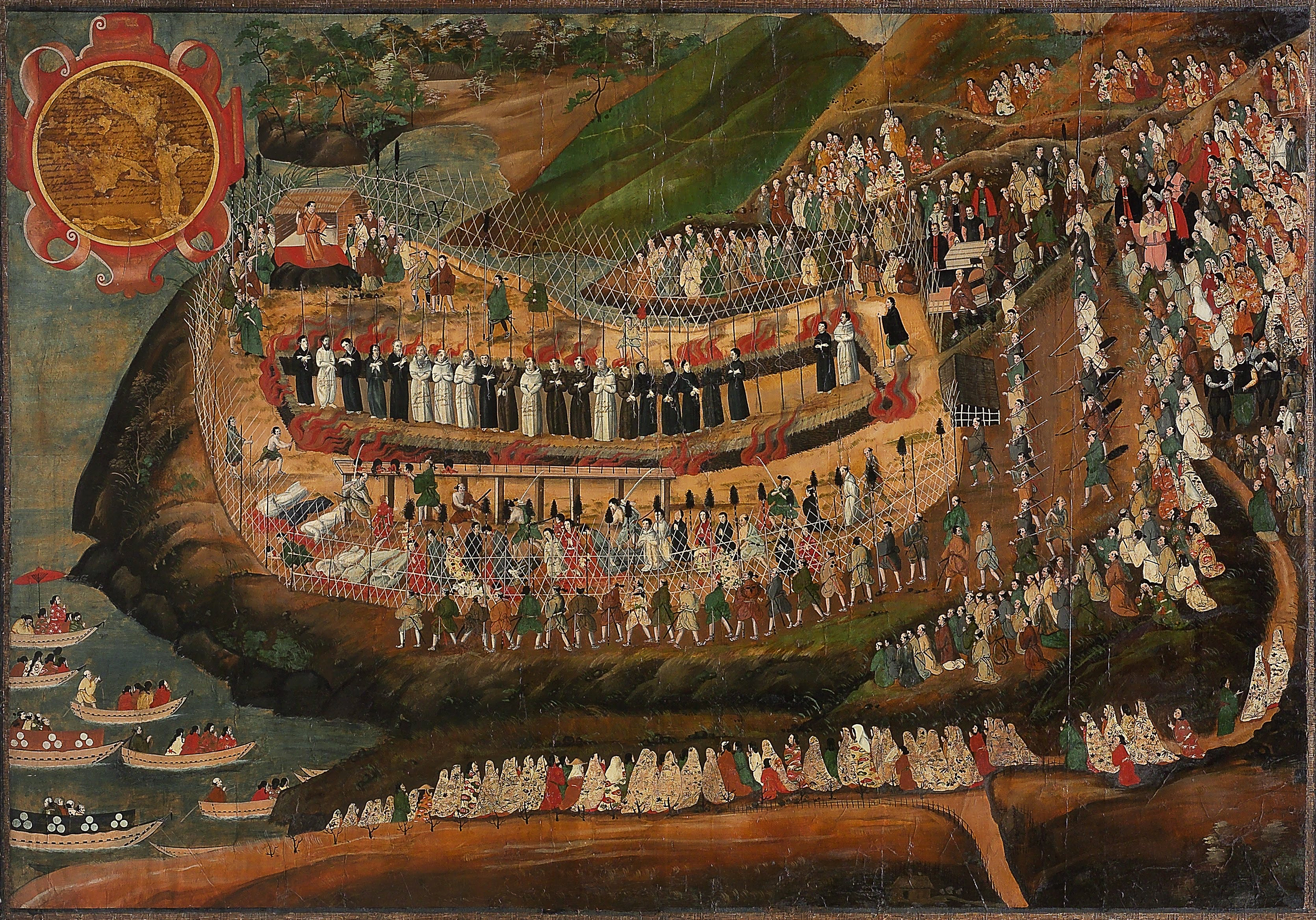
The Christian martyrs of the 1622 Great Genna Martyrdom. 17th-century Japanese painting.

Tokugawa Ieyasu assumed control over Japan in 1600. Like Toyotomi Hideyoshi, he disliked Christian activities in Japan. The Tokugawa shogunate finally decided to ban Catholicism in 1614, and in the mid-17th century it demanded the expulsion of all European missionaries and the execution of all converts. This marked the end of open Christianity in Japan. The Shimabara Rebellion, led by a young Japanese Christian boy named Amakusa Shirō Tokisada, took place in 1637. After the Hara Castle fell, the shogunate's forces beheaded an estimated 37,000 rebels and sympathizers. Amakusa Shirō's severed head was taken to Nagasaki for public display, and the entire complex at Hara Castle was burned to the ground and buried together with the bodies of all the dead.

Many of the Christians in Japan continued for two centuries to maintain their religion as Kakure Kirishitan, or hidden Christians, without any priests or pastors. Some of those who were killed for their Faith are venerated as the Martyrs of Japan.

Christianity was later allowed during the Meiji era. The Meiji Constitution of 1890 introduced separation of church and state and permitted freedom of religion.

=== Kingdom of Mysore ===
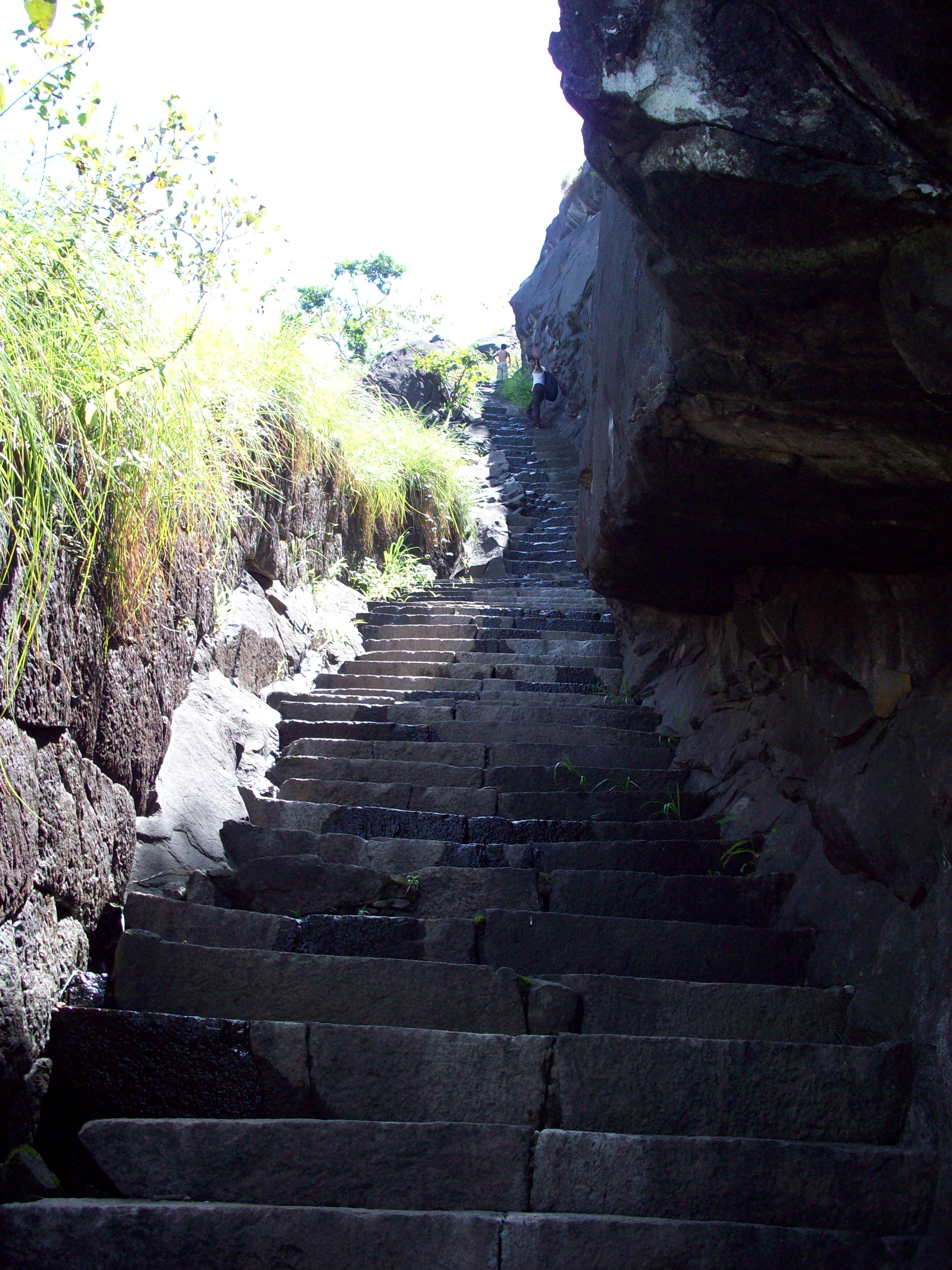
The Jamalabad fort route. Mangalorean Catholics had traveled through this route on their way to Seringapatam.

Muslim Tipu Sultan, the ruler of the Kingdom of Mysore, took action against the Mangalorean Catholic community from Mangalore and the South Canara district on the southwestern coast of India. Tipu was widely reputed to be anti-Christian. He took Mangalorean Catholics into captivity at Seringapatam on 24 February 1784 and released them on 4 May 1799.

Soon after the Treaty of Mangalore in 1784, Tipu gained control of Canara. He issued orders to seize the Christians in Canara, confiscate their estates, and deport them to Seringapatam, the capital of his empire, through the Jamalabad fort route. There were no priests among the captives. Together with Fr. Miranda, all the 21 arrested priests were issued orders of expulsion to Goa, fined 20,000,000 (2 lakh) rupees, and threatened death by hanging if they ever returned. Tipu ordered the destruction of 27 Catholic churches.

According to Thomas Munro, a Scottish soldier and the first collector of Canara, around 60,000 of them, nearly 92 percent of the entire Mangalorean Catholic community, were captured. 7,000 escaped. Observer Francis Buchanan reports that 70,000 were captured, from a population of 80,000, with 10,000 escaping. They were forced to climb nearly 4,000 feet (1,200 m) through the jungles of the Western Ghat mountain ranges. It was 210 miles (340 km) from Mangalore to Seringapatam, and the journey took six weeks. According to British Government records, 20,000 of them died on the march to Seringapatam. According to James Scurry, a British officer, who was held captive along with Mangalorean Catholics, 30,000 of them were forcibly converted to Islam. The young women and girls were forcibly made wives of the Muslims living there and later distributed and sold in prostitution. The young men who offered resistance were disfigured by cutting their noses, upper lips, and ears.

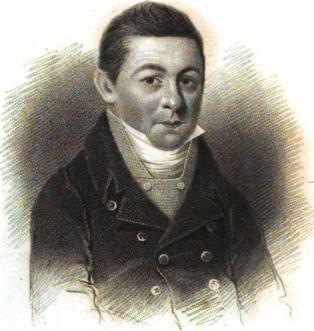
The British officer James Scurry, who was detained a prisoner for 10 years by Tipu Sultan along with the Mangalorean Catholics

Tipu Sultan's invasion of the Malabar Coast had an adverse impact on the Saint Thomas Christian community of the Malabar coast. Many churches in Malabar and Cochin were damaged. The old Syrian Nasrani seminary at Angamaly which had been the center of Catholic religious education for several centuries was razed to the ground by Tipu's soldiers. Many centuries-old religious manuscripts were lost forever. The church was later relocated to Kottayam where it still exists to this date. The Mor Sabor church at Akaparambu and the Martha Mariam Church attached to the seminary were destroyed as well. Tipu's army set fire to the church at Palayoor and attacked the Ollur Church in 1790. Furthernmore, the Arthat church and the Ambazhakkad seminary was also destroyed. Over the course of this invasion, many Saint Thomas Christians were killed or forcibly converted to Islam. Most of the coconut, arecanut, pepper and cashew plantations held by the Saint Thomas Christian farmers were also indiscriminately destroyed by the invading army. As a result, when Tipu's army invaded Guruvayur and adjacent areas, the Syrian Christian community fled Calicut and small towns like Arthat to new centres like Kunnamkulam, Chalakudi, Ennakadu, Cheppadu, Kannankode, Mavelikkara, etc. where there were already Christians. They were given refuge by Sakthan Tamburan, the ruler of Cochin and Karthika Thirunal, the ruler of Travancore, who gave them lands, plantations and encouraged their businesses. Colonel Macqulay, the British resident of Travancore also helped them.

Tipu's persecution of Christians also extended to captured British soldiers. For instance, there were a significant amount of forced conversions of British captives between 1780 and 1784. Following their disastrous defeat at the battle of Pollilur, 7,000 British men along with an unknown number of women were held captive by Tipu in the fortress of Seringapatnam. Of these, over 300 were circumcised and given Muslim names and clothes, and several British regimental drummer boys were made to wear ghagra cholis and entertain the court as nautch girls or dancing girls. According to James Scurry, who had been jailed, he gained an inability to use western cutlery, a change in his preferred clothing, a darker skin tone, and having ""broken and confused" English that no longer had "all its vernacular idiom". Scurry had a confinement period of 10 years.

=== Ottoman Empire ===
Historian Warren Treadgold gives a summary on the historical background highlighting the cumulative effects of the relentless Turkish Muslim depredations against the Byzantine Empire in its Anatolian heartland by the late 14th century:

As the Turks raided and conquered, they enslaved many Christians, selling some in other Muslim regions and hindering the rest from practicing their faith. Conversions [to islam], Turkish migration, and Greek outmigration increasingly endangered the Greek minority in central Asia Minor. When the Turks overran Western Anatolia, they occupied the countryside first, driving the Greeks into the cities, or away to Europe, or the islands. By the time the Anatolian cities fell, the land around them was already largely Turkish [and Islamic].

In accordance with the traditional custom which was practiced at the time, Sultan Mehmed II allowed his troops and his entourage to engage in unbridled pillaging and looting in the city of Constantinople for three full days shortly after it was captured. Once the three days passed, he claimed its remaining contents for himself. However, at the end of the first day, he proclaimed that the looting should cease because he felt profound sadness when he toured the looted and enslaved city. Hagia Sophia was not exempted from the pillage and looting and specifically became its focal point as the invaders believed it to contain the greatest treasures and valuables of the city. Shortly after the defence of the Walls of Constantinople collapsed and the Ottoman troops entered the city victoriously, the pillagers and looters made their way to the Hagia Sophia and battered down its doors before storming in.

Throughout the period of the siege of Constantinople, the worshippers who were trapped in the city participated in the Divine Liturgy and they also recited the Prayer of the Hours at the Hagia Sophia and the church formed a safe-haven and a refuge for many of those worshippers who were unable to contribute to the city's defence, which comprised women, children, elderly, the sick and the wounded. Being trapped in the church, the many congregants and yet more refugees inside became spoils-of-war to be divided amongst the triumphant invaders. The building was desecrated and looted, with the helpless occupants who sought shelter within the church being enslaved. While most of the elderly and the infirm/wounded and sick were killed, and the remainder (mainly teenage males and young boys) were chained up and sold into slavery.

The women of Constantinople also suffered from rape at the hands of Ottoman forces. According to Barbaro, "all through the day the Turks made a great slaughter of Christians through the city". According to historian Philip Mansel, widespread persecution of the city's civilian inhabitants took place, resulting in thousands of murders and rapes, and 30,000 civilians being enslaved or forcibly deported. George Sphrantzes says that people of both genders were raped inside Hagia Sophia.

Since the time of the Austro-Turkish war (1683–1699), relations between Muslims and Christians who lived in the European provinces of the Ottoman Empire gradually deteriorated and this deterioration in interfaith relations occasionally resulted in calls for the expulsion or extermination of local Christian communities by some Muslim religious leaders. As a result of Ottoman oppression, the destruction of Churches and Monasteries, and violence against the non-Muslim civilian population, Serbian Christians and their church leaders, headed by Serbian Patriarch Arsenije III, sided with the Austrians in 1689 and again in 1737 under Serbian Patriarch Arsenije IV. In the following punitive campaigns, Ottoman forces conducted systematic atrocities against the Christian population in the Serbian regions, resulted in the Great Migrations of the Serbs.

==== Ottoman Albania and Kosovo ====
Before the late 16th century, Albania's population remained overwhelmingly Christian, despite the fact that it was under Ottoman rule, unlike the more diverse populations of other regions of the Ottoman Empire, such as Bosnia, Bulgaria and Northern Greece, the mountainous Albania was a frequent site of revolts against Ottoman rule, often at an enormous human cost, such as the destruction of entire villages. In response, the Ottomans abandoned their usual policy of tolerating Christians in favor of a policy which was aimed at reducing the size of Albania's Christian population through Islamization, beginning in the restive Christian regions of Reka and Elbasan in 1570.

The pressures which resulted from this campaign included particularly harsh economic conditions which were imposed on Albania's Christian population; while earlier taxes on the Christians were around 45 akçes a year, by the middle of the 17th century the rate had been multiplied by 27 to 780 akçes a year. Albanian elders often opted to save their clans and villages from hunger and economic ruin by advocating village-wide and region-wide conversions to Islam, with many individuals frequently continuing to practice Christianity in private.

A failed Catholic rebellion in 1596 and the Albanian population's support of Austro-Hungary during the Great Turkish War, and its support of the Venetians in the 1644 Venetian-Ottoman War as well as the Orlov Revolt were all factors which led to punitive measures in which outright force was accompanied by economic incentives depending on the region, and ended up forcing the conversion of large Christian populations to Islam in Albania. In the aftermath of the Great Turkish War, massive punitive measures were imposed on Kosovo's Catholic Albanian population and as a result of them, most members of it fled to Hungary and settled around Buda, where most of them died of disease and starvation.

After the Orthodox Serbian population's subsequent flight from Kosovo, the pasha of Ipek (Peja/Pec) forced Albanian Catholic mountaineers to repopulate Kosovo by deporting them to Kosovo, and also forced them adopt Islam. In the 17th and 18th centuries, South Albania also saw numerous instances of violence which was directed against those who remained Christian by local newly converted Muslims, ultimately resulting in many more conversions out of fear as well as flight to faraway lands by the Christian population.

== Modern era (1815 to 1989) ==
The Second Vatican Council made reference in 1965 to continuing persecutions and to "regions where the freedom of the [Catholic] Church is seriously infringed", noting that where the ministry of ordained clergy was not permitted, the activities of individual lay people and the "heroic fortitude" they demonstrated were critical in enabling the church's work to continue.

Specific regions and nations where Christian persecution continued, until the Revolutions of 1989 led to the collapse of the Eastern Bloc and the end of state atheism in many territories, include:

=== Communist Albania ===
Religion in Albania was subordinated to the interests of Marxism during the rule of the country's communist party when all religions were suppressed. This policy was justified by the communist stance of state atheism from 1967 to 1991. The Agrarian Reform Law of August 1945 nationalized most of the property which belonged to religious institutions, including the estates of mosques, monasteries, religious orders, and dioceses. Many clergy and believers were tried and some of them were executed. All foreign Roman Catholic priests, monks, and nuns were expelled from Albania in 1946. The military seized churches, cathedrals and mosques and converted them into basketball courts, movie theaters, dance halls, and the like; and members of the clergy were stripped of their titles and imprisoned. Around 6,000 Albanians were disappeared and murdered by agents of the Communist government, and their bodies were never found or identified. Albanians continued to be imprisoned, tortured and killed for their religious practices well into 1991.

Religious communities or branches of them which had their headquarters outside the country, such as the Jesuit and Franciscan orders, were henceforth ordered to terminate their activities in Albania. Religious institutions were forbidden to have anything to do with the education of the young, because that activity had been made the exclusive province of the state. All religious communities were prohibited from owning real estate and they were also prohibited from operating philanthropic and welfare institutions and hospitals. Enver Hoxha's overarching goal was the eventual destruction of all organized religions in Albania, despite some variance in his approach to it.

=== Equatorial Guinea ===
Under Francisco Macías Nguema's rule, Christianity was outlawed in Equatorial Guinea. He used the slogan, sometimes claimed to be the national motto, "There is no other God than Macías". Owning anything related to Christianity became a reason for imprisonment due to alleged support for anti-government plots or coup attempts.

=== Iraq ===
The Assyrians were subjected to another series of persecutions during the Simele massacre of 1933. British officials estimated around 600 Assyrian civilians were killed at the hands of the Kingdom of Iraq, though Assyrian sources estimated a death toll in the thousands.

In 1987, the last Iraqi census counted 1.4 million Christians. They were tolerated under the secular regime of Saddam Hussein, who even made one of them, Tariq Aziz his deputy. However, Saddam Hussein's government continued to persecute the Christians on an ethnic, cultural and racial basis, because the vast majority are Mesopotamian Eastern Aramaic-speaking ethnic Assyrians (aka Chaldo-Assyrians). The Assyro-Aramaic language and script was repressed, the giving of Hebraic/Aramaic Christian names or Akkadian/Assyro-Babylonian names was forbidden (for example Tariq Aziz's real name was Michael Youhanna), and Saddam exploited religious differences between Assyrian denominations such as Chaldean Catholics, the Assyrian Church of the East, the Syriac Orthodox Church, the Assyrian Pentecostal Church and the Ancient Church of the East, in an attempt to divide them. Many Assyrians and Armenians were ethnically cleansed from their towns and villages during the al Anfal Campaign in 1988, despite the fact that this campaign was primarily directed against the Kurds.

=== Madagascar ===
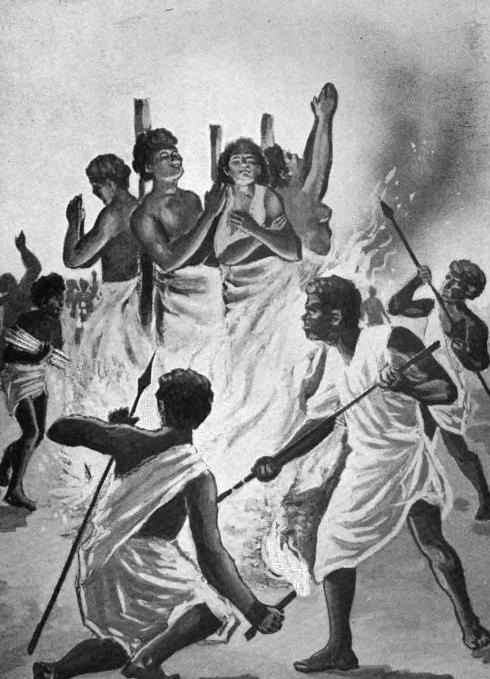
Christian martyrs burned at the stake by Ranavalona I in Madagascar

Queen Ranavalona I (reigned 1828–1861) issued a royal edict prohibiting the practice of Christianity in Madagascar, expelled British missionaries from the island, and sought to stem the growth of conversion to Christianity within her realm. Far more, however, were punished in other ways: many were required to undergo the tangena ordeal, while others were condemned to hard labor or the confiscation of their land and property, and many of these consequently died. The tangena ordeal was commonly administered to determine the guilt or innocence of an accused person for any crime, including the practice of Christianity, and involved ingestion of the poison contained within the nut of the tangena tree (Cerbera odollam). Survivors were deemed innocent, while those who perished were assumed guilty.

In 1838, it was estimated that as many as 100,000 people in Imerina died as a result of the tangena ordeal, constituting roughly 20% of the population. contributing to a strongly unfavorable view of Ranavalona's rule in historical accounts. Malagasy Christians would remember this period as ny tany maizina, or "the time when the land was dark". Persecution of Christians intensified in 1840, 1849 and 1857; in 1849, deemed the worst of these years by British missionary to Madagascar W.E. Cummins (1878), 1,900 people were fined, jailed or otherwise punished in relation to their Christian faith, including 18 executions.

=== Nazi Germany ===
Hitler and the Nazis received some support from certain Christian communities, in particular the German Christian movement within the German Evangelical Church. Once in power, the Nazis moved to consolidate their power over the German churches and bring them in line with Nazi ideals. Some historians say that Hitler had a general covert plan, which some of them say existed even before the Nazis' rise to power, to destroy Christianity within the Reich, which was to be accomplished through Nazi control and subversion of the churches and it would be completed after the war. The Third Reich founded its own version of Christianity which was called Positive Christianity, a Nazi version of Christianity which made major changes in the interpretation of the Bible by arguing that Jesus Christ was the son of God, but he was not a Jew, arguing that Jesus despised Jews and Judaism, and arguing that the Jews were the ones who were solely responsible for Jesus's death.

Outside mainstream Christianity, the Jehovah's Witnesses were targets of Nazi Persecution, for their refusal to swear allegiance to the Nazi government. In Nazi Germany in the 1930s and early 1940s, Jehovah's Witnesses refused to renounce their political neutrality and as a result, they were imprisoned in concentration camps. The Nazi government gave detained Jehovah's Witnesses the option of release if they signed a document which indicated their renunciation of their faith, their submission to state authority, and their support of the German military. Historian Hans Hesse said, "Some five thousand Jehovah's Witnesses were sent to concentration camps where they alone were 'voluntary prisoners', so termed because the moment they recanted their views, they could be freed. Some lost their lives in the camps, but few renounced their faith."

=== Empire of Japan ===
At its height, the Empire of Japan forced its subjects in the territories it occupied to worship Japanese deities in Shinto shrines in a state-sponsored Shinto programme, and Christians in the occupied Korean peninsula were no exception. Under pressure from the Imperial Japanese Government, the Presbyterian Church, which was the largest community of Protestant Christians in Korea at the time, ruled that 'Shinto shrines are not a religion, and [bowing before them] is a celebration of a state'. However, some Christians, like Chu Ki-chol, who viewed bowing before the deities in a Shinto shrine as worshipping idols and therefore against Christian doctrines, continued to resist such pressures.

=== Late Ottoman Empire ===
During the modern era, relations between Muslims and Christians in the Ottoman Empire were largely shaped by broader dynamics which were related to European colonial and neo-imperialist activities in the region, dynamics which frequently (though by no means always) generated tensions between the two communities. Too often, growing European influence in the region during the nineteenth century seemed to disproportionately benefit Christians, thus, it triggered resentment on the part of many Muslims, likewise, many Muslims suspected that Christians and the European powers were plotting to weaken the Islamic world. Further exacerbating relations was the fact that Christians seemed to disproportionately benefit from efforts at reform (one aspect of which generally sought to elevate the political status of non-Muslims), likewise, the various Christian nationalist uprisings in the Empire's European territories, which often had the support of the European powers.

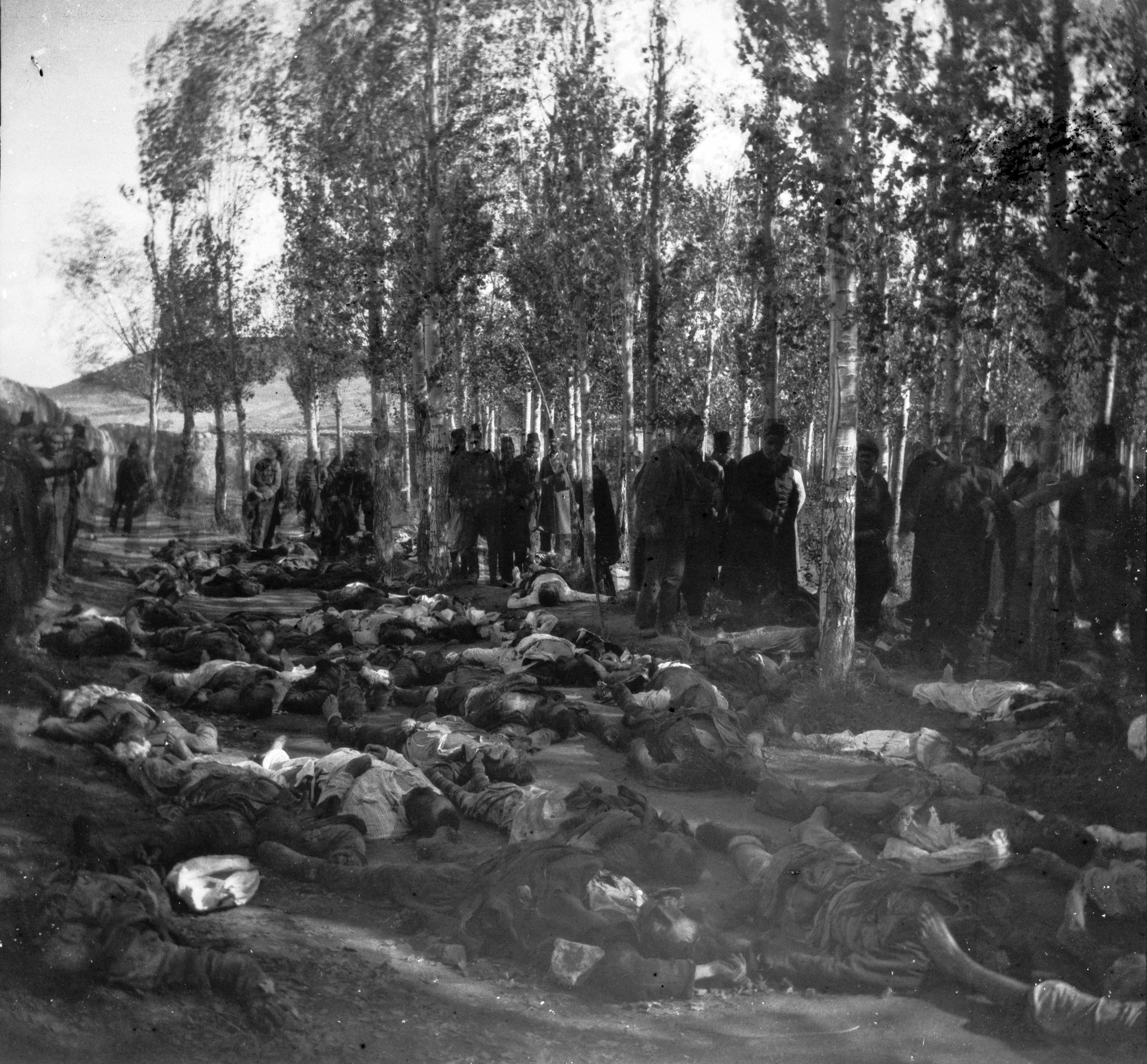
Corpses of massacred Armenian Christians in Erzurum in 1895

Persecutions and forced migrations of Christian populations were induced by Ottoman forces during the 19th century in the European and Asian provinces of the Ottoman Empire. The Massacres of Badr Khan were conducted by Kurdish and Ottoman forces against the Assyrian Christian population of the Ottoman Empire between 1843 and 1847, resulting in the slaughter of more than 10,000 indigenous Assyrian civilians of the Hakkari region, with many thousands more being sold into slavery.

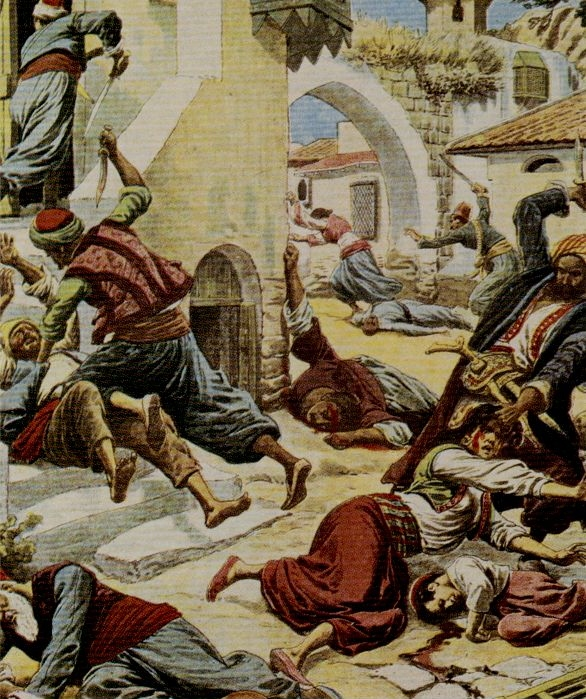
Adana massacre of 1909

On 17 October 1850 the Muslim majority began rioting against the Uniate Catholics – a minority that lived in the communities of Judayda, in the city of Aleppo.

During the Bulgarian Uprising against Ottoman rule (1876), and the Russo-Turkish War (1877–1878), the persecution of the Bulgarian Christian population was conducted by Ottoman soldiers. The principal locations were Panagurishte, Perushtitza, and Bratzigovo. Over 15,000 non-combatant Bulgarian civilians were killed by the Ottoman army between 1876 and 1878, with the worst single instance being the Batak massacre. During the war, whole cities including the largest Bulgarian one (Stara Zagora) were destroyed and most of their inhabitants were killed, the rest being expelled or enslaved. The atrocities included impaling and grilling people alive. Similar attacks were undertaken by Ottoman troops against Serbian Christians during the Serbian-Turkish War (1876–1878).

Greek-Orthodox metropolises in Asia Minor, c. 1880. Since 1923, only the Metropolis of Chalcedon retains a small community.

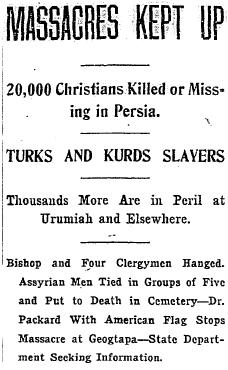
The Assyrian genocide was a mass slaughter of the Assyrian population perpetrated by Ottoman forces and some Kurdish tribes during World War I.

The abolition of jizya and emancipation of formerly dhimmi subjects was one of the most embittering stipulations the Ottoman Empire had to accept to end the Crimean War in 1856. Then, "for the first time since 1453, church bells were permitted to ring... in Constantinople," writes M. J. Akbar. "Many Muslims declared it a day of mourning." Indeed, because superior social standing was from the start one of the advantages of conversion to Islam, resentful Muslim mobs rioted and hounded Christians all over the empire. In 1860 up to 30,000 Christians were massacred in the Levant alone. Mark Twain recounts what took place in the levant:

Men, women and children were butchered indiscriminately and left to rot by hundreds all through the Christian quarter... the stench was dreadful. All the Christians who could get away fled from the city, and the Mohammedans would not defile their hands by burying the 'infidel dogs.' The thirst for blood extended to the high lands of Hermon and Anti-Lebanon, and in a short time twenty-five thousand more Christians were massacred.

Between 1894 and 1896, a series of ethno-religiously motivated anti-Christian pogroms known as the Hamidian massacres were conducted against the ancient Armenian and Assyrian Christian populations by the forces of the Ottoman Empire. The motives for these massacres were an attempt to reassert Pan-Islamism in the Ottoman Empire, resentment of the comparative wealth of the ancient indigenous Christian communities, and a fear that they would attempt to secede from the tottering Ottoman Empire. The massacres mainly took place in what is today southeastern Turkey, northeastern Syria and northern Iraq. Assyrians and Armenians were massacred in Diyarbakir, Hasankeyef, Sivas and other parts of Anatolia and northern Mesopotamia, by Sultan Abdul Hamid II. The death toll is estimated to have been as high as 325,000 people, with a further 546,000 Armenians and Assyrians made destitute by forced deportations of survivors from cities, and the destruction or theft of almost 2500 of their farmsteads towns and villages. Hundreds of churches and monasteries were also destroyed or forcibly converted into mosques. These attacks caused the death of over thousands of Assyrians and the forced "Ottomanisation" of the inhabitants of 245 villages. The Ottoman troops looted the remains of the Assyrian settlements and these were later stolen and occupied by south-east Anatolian tribes. Unarmed Assyrian women and children were raped, tortured and murdered. According to H. Aboona, the independence of the Assyrians was destroyed not directly by the Turks but by their neighbours under Ottoman auspices.

The Adana massacre occurred in the Adana Vilayet of the Ottoman Empire in April 1909. A massacre of Armenian and Assyrian Christians in the city of Adana and its surrounds amidst the 31 March Incident led to a series of anti-Christian pogroms throughout the province. Reports estimated that the Adana Province massacres resulted in the death of as many as 30,000 Armenians and 1,500 Assyrians.

Between 1915 and 1921 the Young Turks government of the collapsing Ottoman Empire persecuted Eastern Christian populations in Anatolia, Persia, Northern Mesopotamia, and The Levant. The onslaught by the late Ottoman army (which included Arab, Kurdish, and Circassian irregulars) resulted in an estimated 3.4 million deaths, divided between roughly 1.5 million Armenian Christians, 0.75 million Assyrian Christians, 0.90 million Greek Orthodox Christians, and 0.25 million Maronite Christians (see Great Famine of Mount Lebanon); groups of Georgian Christians were also killed. The massive ethno-religious cleansing expelled from the empire or killed the Assyrians, Armenians, Greeks, and Bulgarians who had not converted to Islam, and it came to be known as the Armenian genocide, Assyrian genocide, Greek genocide, and Great Famine of Mount Lebanon. which accounted for the deaths of Armenian, Assyrian, Greek and Maronite Christians, and the deportation and destitution of many more. The Genocide led to the devastation of ancient indigenous Christian populations who had inhabited the Middle East for thousands of years.

Benny Morris, Dror Ze'evi, Uğur Ümit Üngör, and several other historians argue that the Armenian genocide, Greek genocide, and Assyrian genocide constitute a series of extermination campaigns, usually referred to as the late Ottoman genocides, that had been carried out by the Ottoman Empire against its Christian subjects.

In the aftermath of the Sheikh Said rebellion, the Syriac Orthodox Church, and the Assyrian Church of the East were subjected to harassment by Turkish authorities, on the grounds that some Assyrians allegedly collaborated with the rebelling Kurds. Consequently, mass deportations took place and Assyrian Patriarch Mar Ignatius Elias III was expelled from the Mor Hananyo Monastery which was turned into a Turkish barrack. The patriarchal seat was then temporarily transferred to Homs.

=== Turkey ===
External videos
- Christian Churches and Cemeteries Were Desecrated in Turkey

The Republic of Turkey was established in 1923, after the vast majority of Christian inhabitants of Anatolia had been expelled and massacred as a result of the late Ottoman genocides. However, there still remained sizeable Greek and Armenian minorities in Istanbul. Beginning in the 1940s, the Turkish government instituted repressive policies forcing many Christians to emigrate. Examples are the labour battalions drafted among non-Muslims during World War II, as well as the Fortune Tax levied mostly on non-Muslims during the same period. These resulted in financial ruination and death for many Christians. The exodus was given greater impetus with the Istanbul Pogrom of September 1955 and the expulsion of Istanbul Greeks which led to thousands of Greeks fleeing the city, eventually reducing the Greek population from 200,000 in 1924 to about 7,000 by 1978 and to about 2,500 by 2006.

=== Soviet Union ===
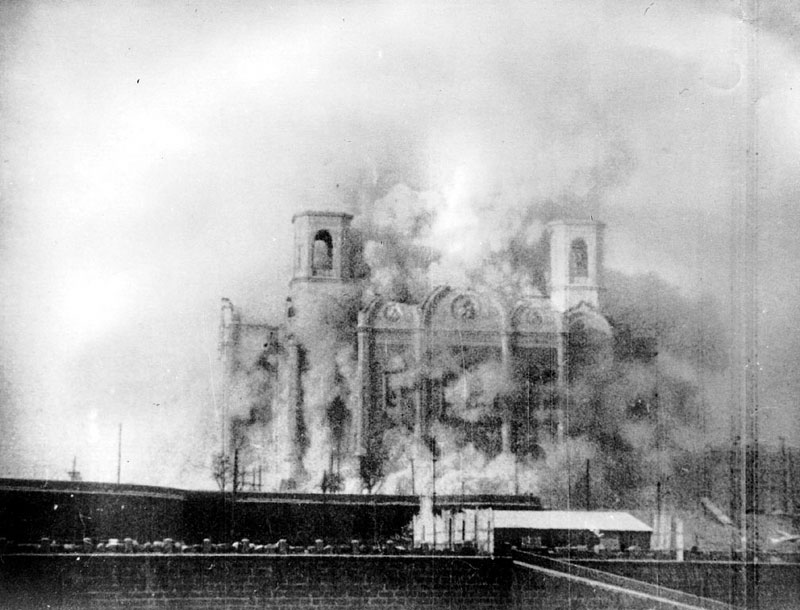
Demolition of the Cathedral of Christ the Saviour on 5 December 1931: The USSR's official state atheism resulted in the 1921–1928 anti-religious campaign, during which many "church institution[s] at [the] local, diocesan, or national level were systematically destroyed."

After the Russian Revolution of 1917, the Bolsheviks undertook a massive program to remove the influence of the Russian Orthodox Church from the government, outlawed antisemitism in society, and promoted atheism. Tens of thousands of churches were destroyed or they were converted to buildings which were used for other purposes, and many members of the clergy were murdered, publicly executed and imprisoned for what the government termed "anti-government activities". An extensive educational and propaganda campaign was launched to convince people, especially children and youths, to abandon their religious beliefs. This persecution resulted in the intentional murder of 500,000 Orthodox followers by the government of the Soviet Union during the 20th century. In the first five years after the Bolshevik revolution, 28 bishops and 1,200 priests were executed.

The state established atheism as the only scientific truth. Soviet authorities forbade the criticism of atheism and agnosticism until 1936 or of the state's anti-religious policies; such criticism could lead to forced retirement. Militant atheism became central to the ideology of the Communist Party of the Soviet Union and a high priority policy of all Soviet leaders. Christopher Marsh, a professor at the Baylor University writes that "Tracing the social nature of religion from Schleiermacher and Feurbach to Marx, Engles, and Lenin...the idea of religion as a social product evolved to the point of policies aimed at the forced conversion of believers to atheism."

Under the doctrine of state atheism in the Soviet Union, a "government-sponsored program of forced conversion to atheism" was conducted by the Communists. The Communist Party destroyed churches, mosques and temples, ridiculed, harassed, incarcerated and executed religious leaders, flooded the schools and media with anti-religious teachings, and it introduced a belief system called "scientific atheism", with its own rituals, promises and proselytizers. Many priests were killed and imprisoned; thousands of churches were closed. In 1925 the government founded the League of Militant Atheists to intensify the persecution. The League of Militant Atheists was also a "nominally independent organization established by the Communist Party to promote atheism".

The Communist regime confiscated church property, ridiculed religion, harassed believers, and propagated atheism in the schools. Actions against particular religions, however, were determined by State interests, and most organized religions were never outlawed. It is estimated that 500,000 Russian Orthodox Christians were martyred in the gulags by the Soviet government, excluding the members of other Christian denominations who were also tortured or killed.

The main target of the anti-religious campaign in the 1920s and 1930s was the Russian Orthodox Church, which had the largest number of faithful worshippers. A very large segment of its clergy, and many of its believers, were shot or sent to labor camps. Theological schools were closed, and church publications were prohibited. In the period between 1927 and 1940, the number of Orthodox Churches in the Russian Republic fell from 29,584 to less than 500. Between 1917 and 1940, 130,000 Orthodox priests were arrested. The widespread persecution and internecine disputes within the church hierarchy led to the seat of Patriarch of Moscow being vacant from 1925 to 1943.

After Operation Barbarossa, Nazi Germany's invasion of the Soviet Union in 1941, Joseph Stalin revived the Russian Orthodox Church in order to intensify the Soviet population's patriotic support of the war effort. By 1957, about 22,000 Russian Orthodox churches had become active. But in 1959, Nikita Khrushchev initiated his own campaign against the Russian Orthodox Church and forced about 12,000 churches to close. By 1985, fewer than 7,000 churches remained active.

In the Soviet Union, in addition to the methodical closure and destruction of churches, the charitable and social work which was formerly done by ecclesiastical authorities was taken over by the state. As with all private property, Church owned property was confiscated and converted to public use by the state. The few places of worship which were left to the Church were legally viewed as state property which the government permitted the church to use. After the advent of state funded universal education, the Church was not permitted to carry on educational, instructional activity for children. For adults, only training for church-related occupations was allowed. With the exception of sermons which could be delivered during the celebration of the divine liturgy, it could not instruct the faithful nor could it evangelize the youth. Catechism classes, religious schools, study groups, Sunday schools and religious publications were all declared illegal and banned. This caused many religious tracts to be circulated as illegal literature or samizdat. Even after the death of Stalin in 1953, the persecution continued, and it did not end until the dissolution of the Soviet Union in 1991. Since the fall of the Soviet Union, the Russian Orthodox Church has recognized a number of New Martyrs as saints, some of whom were executed during the Mass operations of the NKVD under directives like NKVD Order No. 00447.

Both before and after the October Revolution of 7 November 1917 (25 October Old Calendar), there was a movement within the Soviet Union which sought to unite all of the people of the world under Communist rule (see Communist International). This movement spread to the Eastern European bloc countries as well as the Balkan States. Since the populations of some of these Slavic countries tied their ethnic heritages to their ethnic churches, the people and their churches were both targeted for ethnic and political genocide by the Soviets and their form of State atheism. The Soviets' official religious stance was one of "religious freedom or tolerance", though the state established atheism as the only scientific truth (see also the Soviet or committee of the All-Union Society for the Dissemination of Scientific and Political Knowledge or Znanie which was until 1947 called The League of the Militant Godless and various Intelligentsia groups). Criticism of atheism was strictly forbidden and sometimes, it resulted in imprisonment. Some of the more high-profile individuals who were executed include Metropolitan Benjamin of Petrograd, priest and scientist Pavel Florensky.

=== Spain ===
The Second Spanish Republic, established in 1931, attempted to establish a regime with separation between State and Church, as had been established in France in 1905. When it was established, the Republic passed legislation which prevented the Church from conducting educational activities. The Spanish Second Republic was characterized by a process of political polarisation, as party divisions became increasingly embittered and questions of religious identity came to assume major political significance. The existence of different Church institutions was an illustration of the situation which resulted from the proclamation which denounced the 2nd Republic as an anti-Catholic, Masonic, Jewish, and Communist internationalist conspiracy which heralded a clash between God and atheism, chaos and harmony, Good and Evil. The Church's high-ranking officials like Isidro Goma, bishop of Tudela, reminded their Christian subjects of their obligation to vote "for the righteous", and they also reminded their priests of their obligation to "educate the consciences." In the Asturian miners' strike of 1934, during the Revolution of 1934, 34 Catholic priests were massacred and churches were systematically burned. Anticlericalists accused the Catholic priesthood and religious orders of hypocrisy: clerics were guilty of taking up arms against the people, of exploiting others for the sake of wealth, and of sexual immorality all while claiming the moral authority of peacefulness, poverty, and chastity.

Since the early years of the existence of the Second Spanish Republic, far-right forces, which were imbued with an ultra-Catholic spirit, attempted to overthrow the Republic. Carlists, Africanistas, and Catholic theologians fostered an atmosphere of social and racial hatred in their speeches and writings. The Catholic Church endorsed the rebellion which was led by the fascist Francisco Franco, and Pope Pius XI expressed sympathy for the Nationalist side during the Spanish Civil War. The Catholic authorities described Franco's war as a "crusade" against the Second Republic, and later the Collective Letter of the Spanish Bishops, 1937 appeared, justifying Franco's attack on the Republic. A similar approach is attested in 1912, when the bishop of Almería José Ignacio de Urbina (founder of the National Anti-Masonic and Anti-Semitic League) announced "a decisive battle that must be unleashed" between the "light" and "darkness". Though the official declaration of the "crusade" followed the Republican persecution of Catholic clerics, the Catholic Church was already predisposed towards Franco's position, because it was seen as the "perfect ally of fascism" while it opposed the anticlerical policies of the Second Republic. The 1936 anticlerical persecution has been seen as "final phase of a long war between clericalism and anticlericalism" and "fully consistent with a Spanish history of popular anticlericalism and anticlerical populism".

Stanley Payne suggested that the persecution of right-wingers and of people who were associated with the Catholic church both before and at the beginning of the Spanish Civil War involved the murder of priests and other clergy, as well as the murder of thousands of lay people, by members of nearly all leftist groups, while a killing spree was also unleashed across the Nationalist zone. During the Spanish Civil War of 1936–1939, and especially during the early months of the conflict, individual clergymen and entire religious communities were executed by leftists, some of whom were communists and anarchists. The death toll of the clergy alone included 13 bishops, 4,172 diocesan priests and seminarians, 2,364 monks and friars and 283 nuns, reaching a total of 6,832 clerical victims. The main perpetrators of the Red Terror were members of the anarchist Federación Anarquista Ibérica, the Confederación Nacional del Trabajo, and the Trotskyist Workers' Party of Marxist Unification. These organizations distanced themselves from the violence, condemned those who were responsible for it or characterized the killings as mob reprisals for acts of violence which had been perpetrated by the clerics themselves, an explanation which was readily accepted by the public.

In addition to the murder of both the clergy and the faithful, the destruction of churches and the desecration of sacred sites and objects was also widespread. On the night of 19 July 1936 alone, some fifty churches were burned. In Barcelona, out of the 58 churches, only the cathedral was spared, and similar desecrations occurred almost everywhere in Republican Spain.

Two exceptions were Biscay and Gipuzkoa, where the Christian Democratic Basque Nationalist Party, after some hesitation, supported the Republic and halted the persecution of Catholics in areas which were held by the Basque Government. All other Catholic churches which were located in the Republican zone were closed. The desecration was not limited to Catholic churches, because synagogues and Protestant churches were also pillaged and closed, but some small Protestant churches were spared. After Francisco Franco's regime rose to power, it would keep Protestant churches and synagogues closed, because it only legalized the Catholic Church.

Payne called the terror the "most extensive and violent persecution of Catholicism in Western History, in some way even more intense than that of the French Revolution." The persecution drove Catholics to the side of the Nationalists, even more of them sided with the Nationalists than would have been expected, because they defended their religious interests and survival.

The Roman Catholic priests who were killed during the Red Terror are considered "Martyrs of the Spanish Civil War", but the priests who were executed by the fascists are not counted among them. A group known as the "498 Spanish Martyrs" was beatified by the Roman Catholic Church's Pope Benedict XVI in 2007. The history of the Red Terror has been obscured by the inattention of scholars and the "embarrassing partiality" of ecclesiastical historians. Some of the numerous non-fascists who were persecuted during Franco's White Terror were Protestants, because the fascists accused them of being associated with Freemasonry, and the persecution which they were subjected to during Franco's White Terror was much more intense than the persecution which they were subjected to during the Red Terror.

=== United States ===
The Latter Day Saints, (Mormons) have been persecuted since their founding in the 1830s. The persecution of the Mormons drove them from New York and Ohio to Missouri, where they continued to be subjected to violent attacks. In 1838, Missouri Governor Lilburn Boggs declared that Mormons had made war on the state of Missouri, so they "must be treated as enemies, and must be exterminated or driven from the State". At least 10,000 Mormons were expelled from the State. In the most violent altercation which occurred at that time, the Haun's Mill massacre, 17 Mormons were murdered by an anti-Mormon mob and 13 other Mormons were wounded. The Extermination Order which was signed by Governor Boggs was not formally invalidated until 25 June 1976, 137 years after being signed.

The Mormons subsequently fled to Nauvoo, Illinois, where hostilities escalated again. In Carthage, Ill., where Joseph Smith was being held on the charge of treason, a mob stormed the jail and killed him. Smith's brother, Hyrum, was also killed. After a succession crisis, most Mormons followed Brigham Young, who organized an evacuation from the United States after the federal government refused to protect them. 70,000 Mormon pioneers crossed the Great Plains to settle in the Salt Lake Valley and surrounding areas. After the Mexican–American War, the area became the US territory of Utah. Over the next 63 years, several actions by the federal government were directed against Mormons in the Mormon Corridor, including the Utah War, the Morrill Anti-Bigamy Act, the Poland Act, Reynolds v. United States, the Edmunds Act, the Edmunds–Tucker Act, and the Reed Smoot hearings.

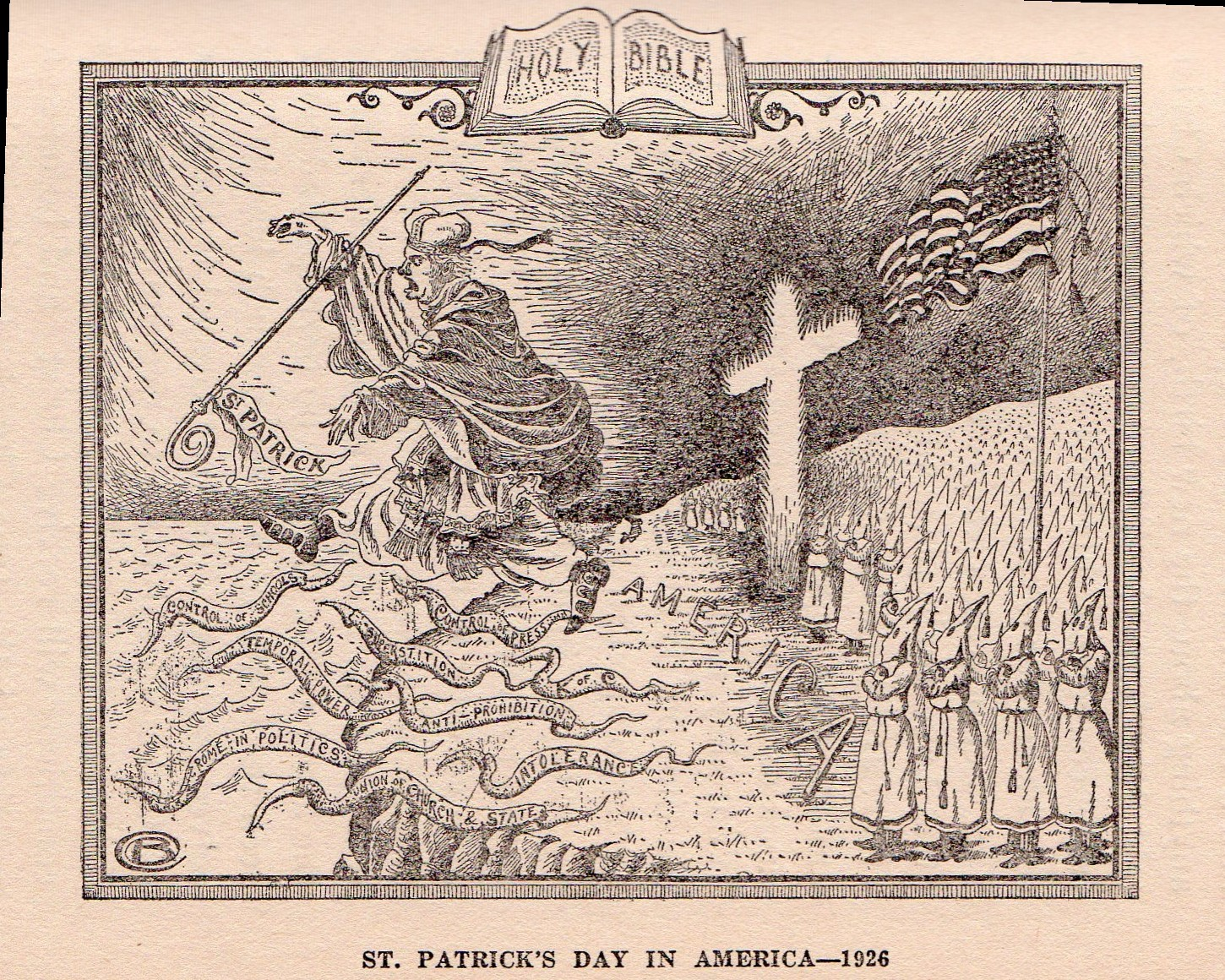
In this 1926 cartoon, the Ku Klux Klan chases the Roman Catholic Church, personified by St Patrick, from the shores of America.

The second iteration of the Ku Klux Klan, founded in 1915 and launched in the 1920s, persecuted Catholics in both the United States and Canada. As stated in its official rhetoric which focused on the threat of the Catholic Church, the Klan was motivated by anti-Catholicism and American nativism. Its appeal was exclusively directed towards white Anglo-Saxon Protestants; it opposed Jews, blacks, Catholics, and newly arriving Southern and Eastern European immigrants such as Italians, Russians, and Lithuanians, many of whom were either Jewish or Catholic.

=== Warsaw Pact countries ===
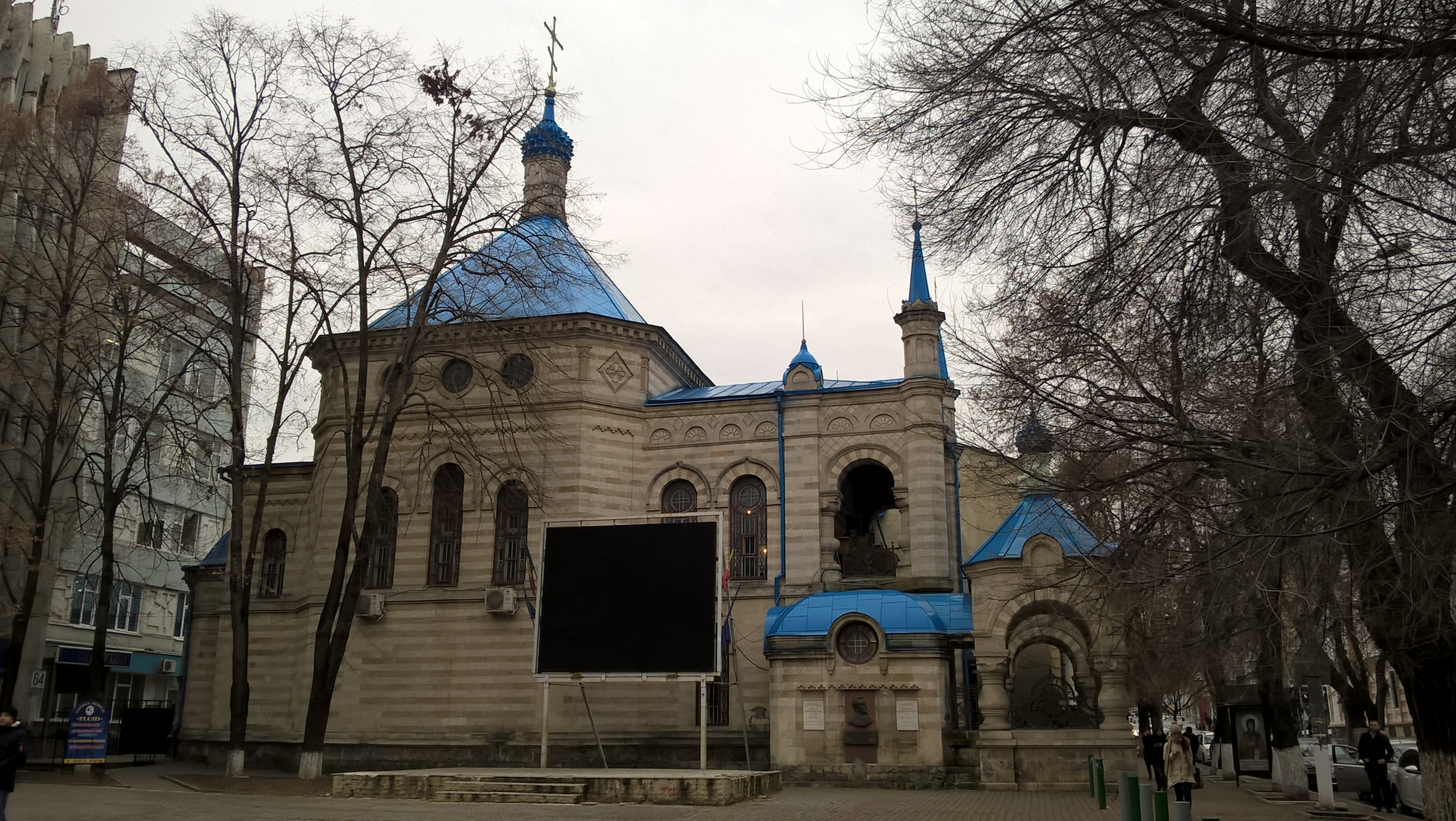
St. Teodora de la Sihla Church in Central Chișinău was one of the churches that were "converted into museums of atheism", in accordance with the doctrine of Marxist–Leninist atheism.

Across Eastern Europe following World War II, the parts of the Nazi Empire which were conquered by the Soviet Red Army and Yugoslavia became one-party Communist states, and the project of coercive conversion to atheism continued. The Soviet Union ended its wartime truce with the Russian Orthodox Church, and extended its persecutions to the newly Communist Eastern bloc: "In Poland, Hungary, Lithuania and other Eastern European countries, Catholic leaders who were unwilling to be silent were denounced, publicly humiliated or imprisoned by the Communists. Leaders of the national Orthodox Churches in Romania and Bulgaria had to be cautious and submissive", wrote Geoffrey Blainey. While the churches were generally not persecuted as harshly as they had been in the USSR, nearly all of their schools and many of their churches were closed, and they lost their formally prominent roles in public life. Children were taught atheism, and clergy were imprisoned by the thousands. In the Eastern Bloc, Christian churches, along with Jewish synagogues and Islamic mosques, were forcibly "converted into museums of atheism."

Along with executions, some other actions which were taken against Orthodox priests and believers included torture, imprisonment in prison camps, labour camps, or mental hospitals.

== Current situation (1989 to the present) ==
In 2010, Pope Benedict XVI said that Christians were the most persecuted religious group in the contemporary world. In a speech to the United Nations Human Rights Council's 23rd session in May 2013, then-Permanent Observer of the Holy See to the United Nations in Geneva, Silvano Maria Tomasi said that "an estimate of more than 100,000 Christians are violently killed because of some relation to their faith every year". This number was supported by the Center for the Study of Global Christianity at the evangelical Gordon–Conwell Theological Seminary in Massachusetts, which published a statement in December 2016 stating that "between 2005 and 2015 there were 900,000 Christian martyrs worldwide – an average of 90,000 per year." Tomasi's radio address to the council called the figures both a "shocking conclusion" and "credible research". The accuracy of this number, based on population estimates in a 1982 edition of the World Christian Encyclopedia, is disputed. Almost all died in wars in the Democratic Republic of the Congo, where all sides of the Second Congo War and subsequent conflicts are majority-Christian, and previous years included victims of the Rwandan genocide, an ethnic conflict, and a part of the First Congo War where again most belligerents were Christian. As a result, the BBC News Magazine cautioned that "when you hear that 100,000 Christians are dying for their faith, you need to keep in mind that the vast majority – 90,000 – are people who were killed in DR Congo".

Klaus Wetzel, a German expert on religious persecution, states that there is a discrepancy in the numbers of reported martyrs due to the contradiction between the definition used by Gordon-Conwell, defining Christian martyrdom in the widest possible sense, and the more sociological and political definition Wetzel himself, Open Doors, and others such as The International Institute for Religious Freedom use, which is: "those who are killed, who would not have been killed, if they had not been Christians".

Several important factors affect these numbers, for example, population distribution. The United States submits an annual report on religious freedom and persecution to Congress, which recognizes restrictions on religious freedom, ranging from low to very high, in three-quarters of the world's countries, including the United States. In approximately one quarter of the world's countries, there are high and very high restrictions and oppression, and some of those countries, such as China, India, Indonesia, and Pakistan, are among those with the highest populations.

Numbers of martyrs are especially difficult to accurately identify, because religious persecution often occurs in conjunction with wider conflicts. This fact complicates the identification of acts of persecution because they may be politically rather than religiously motivated. For example, the U.S. Department of State identified 1.4 million Christians in Iraq in 1991 when the Gulf War began. By 2010, the number of Christians dropped to 700,000, and by 2011 it was estimated that there were between 450,000 and 200,000 Christians left in Iraq. During that period, actions against Christians included the burning and bombing of churches, the bombing of Christian-owned businesses and homes, kidnapping, murder, demands for protection money, and anti-Christian rhetoric in the media, with those responsible saying that they wanted to rid the country of its Christians.

In 2025, the Vatican published a list of over 1600 people who it says were killed for their Christian faith since the year 2000. The list was made public during the Jubilee of the Martyrs, as part of the Catholic Church's 2025 Jubilee of Hope, in a ceremony presided over by Pope Leo XIV, who said: "During this Jubilee Year, we celebrate the hope of these courageous witnesses of the faith. It is a hope filled with immortality because their martyrdom continues to spread the Gospel in a world marked by hatred, violence and war; it is a hope filled with immortality because, even though they have been killed in body, no one can silence their voice or erase the love they have shown; it is a hope filled with immortality because their witness lives on as a prophecy of the victory of good over evil."

The list resulted from extensive research and included people from all confessions recognised as Christian by the Catholic Church, and not just Catholic victims of martyrdom.

A report which was released by the UK's Secretary of State for Foreign and Commonwealth Affairs and prepared by Philip Mounstephen, the Bishop of Truro, in July 2019, and a report on worldwide restrictions on religious freedom by the PEW organization, both stated that the number of countries where Christians were suffering as a result of religious persecution was increasing, rising from 125 in 2015 to 144 as of 2018. (Note: PEW measured government restrictions and social hostilities: laws and policies restricting religious freedom (such as requiring religious groups to register in order to operate) and government favoritism of religious groups (through the funding of religious education, property and clergy, for example); government limits on religious activities and government harassment of religious groups. One category of social hostilities has substantially increased – hostilities which are related to religious norms (for example, the harassment of women for violating religious dress codes). Two other types of social hostility, harassment by individuals and social groups (ranging from small gangs to mob violence) and religious violence by organized groups (including neo-Nazi groups such as the Nordic Resistance Movement and Islamist groups like Boko Haram), have risen more modestly. A fourth category of social hostility is interreligious tension and violence (for instance, sectarian or communal clashes between Hindus and Muslims in India).) PEW has published a caution concerning the interpretation of its numbers: "The Center's recent report ... does not attempt to estimate the number of victims in each country... it does not speak to the intensity of harassment..."

The Internationale Gesellschaft für Menschenrechte – the International Society for Human Rights – in Frankfurt, Germany, is a non-governmental organization with 30,000 members from 38 countries who monitor human rights. In September 2009, then chairman Martin Lessenthin, issued a report estimating that 80% of acts of religious persecution around the world were aimed at Christians at that time.

W. J. Blumenfeld says that Christianity enjoys dominant group privilege in the US and some other Western societies. Christianity is, numerically, the largest religion in the U.S. according to PEW, with 43% of Americans identifying themselves as Protestants and one in five (20%) of Americans identifying themselves as Catholics. It remains the largest religion in the world. Roughly two-thirds of the world's countries have Christian majorities. Due to the large number of Christian-majority countries, differing groups of Christians are harassed and persecuted in Christian countries such as Eritrea and Mexico more often than in most Muslim countries, though not in greater numbers.

According to PEW, the Middle East and North Africa have experienced the highest rates of restrictions on non-favorite religions for the last decade, being higher than any other region, each year, from 2007 to 2017. But it's the gap between this region and other regions where government favoritism is concerned that is particularly large: "the average country in this region scores nearly twice as high on measures of government favoritism of one religion as the average country in any other region".

The United States Commission on International Religious Freedom, a bipartisan independent federal agency which was created by the United States Congress in 1998, published a study of the predominantly Muslim countries which are located in the Middle Eastern/North African region. It concludes that, of the world's 1.3 billion Muslims, "28 percent live in ten countries that declare themselves to be Islamic states. In addition, there are 12 predominantly Muslim countries that have chosen to declare that Islam is the official state religion ... Taken together, the 22 states that declare that Islam is the official religion account for 58 percent – or just over 600 million – of the 1 billion Muslims living in 44 predominantly Muslim countries.

"Several countries with constitutions establishing Islam as the state religion either do not contain guarantees of the right to freedom of religion or belief, or they contain guarantees that, on their face, do not compare favorably with all aspects of international [human rights] standards." All of these countries defer to religious authorities or doctrines on legal issues in some way. For example, "when one spouse is Muslim, and the other has a different religion (such as Coptic Christianity), or if spouses are members of different Christian denominations, courts still defer to Islamic family law." Grim and Finke say their studies indicate that: "When religious freedoms are denied through the regulation of religious profession or practice, violent religious persecution and conflict increase." In its annual report, the USCIRF lists 14 "Countries of Particular Concern" with regard to religious rights, and it also lists 15 additional countries which it has recommended be placed on the U.S. Department of State's Special Watch List (SWL), a lesser category than the CPC designation.

Eleven predominantly Muslim countries are ruled by governments which proclaim that their states are secular. "These countries account for nearly 140 million Muslims, or 13.5 percent of the 1 billion Muslims living in predominantly Muslim countries. The 11 remaining predominantly Muslim countries have not made any constitutional declaration concerning the Islamic or secular nature of the state, and have not made Islam the official state religion. This group of countries, which includes Indonesia, the world's largest Muslim country, accounts for over 250 million Muslims".

The rise of Hindutva (Hindu nationalism) in India, led by the Bharatiya Janata Party, has seen increasing persecution and violence against Christians.

In Nigeria, the country's Christian population has experienced religious violence, persecution, terrorist attacks, forced displacements, and massacres. Christians have historically been concentrated in the southern and central parts of the country, representing approximately half of the nation's population, while Muslims have traditionally lived in the northern areas, representing the other share of the country's citizens. The attacks against Nigerian Christians have mostly come from members of the jihadist terrorist organization Boko Haram or radicalized Fulani herdsmen.

In 2026, pontifical foundation Aid to the Church in Need published the 10th biannual edition of its report "Persecuted & Forgotten?", which focuses on Christian persecution in 18 of the countries considered most hostile to Christians. It concluded that persecution had not lessened in any of the states covered, but had in fact worsened in 10 of them.

== See also ==
- International Day of Prayer for the Persecuted Church
- Anti-Christian sentiment
- List of massacres in Turkey
- Anti-Christian ethnic discrimination in Israel
- Attempted assassination of Pope John Paul II
- Christian persecution complex
  - Foolishness for Christ
  - Martyrdom in Christianity
- Christianity and other religions
- Christianity and politics
- Christianity and violence
  - Christian fascism
  - Christian fundamentalism
  - Christian nationalism
  - Christian terrorism
  - History of Christian thought on persecution and tolerance
- Criticism of Christianity
  - Anti-Catholicism
  - Anti-Mormonism
  - Anti-Protestantism
    - Catholic–Protestant relations
  - Persecution of Eastern Orthodox Christians
  - Persecution of Jehovah's Witnesses
  - Sectarian violence among Christians
- Hindu nationalism
  - Hindutva
  - Hindu terrorism
- Islam and other religions
- Politics and Islam
  - Political Islam
- Islam and violence
  - Al-Qaeda
  - Boko Haram
  - Islamic extremism
    - International propagation of Salafism and Wahhabism
  - Islamic fundamentalism
    - Islamism
  - Islamic State
    - Persecution of Christians by the Islamic State
  - Islamic terrorism
    - Jihadism
      - Salafi jihadism
  - Sectarian violence among Muslims
    - Persecution of minority Muslim groups
  - Taliban
      - Pakistani Taliban
- Jewish views on religious pluralism
  - Anti-Judaism
  - Antisemitism
    - Antisemitism by country
    - History of antisemitism
      - Persecution of Jews
- Judaism and violence
  - Jewish fundamentalism
  - Jewish religious terrorism
  - Kahanism
  - Martyrdom in Judaism
  - Zionist political violence
- List of cases of church arson

== Sources ==
- Bowring, Lewin B. (1893), Haidar Ali and Tipu Sultan and the Struggle with the Musalman Powers of the South, IDARAH-I ADABIYAT-I DELLI, ISBN 978-81-206-1299-0, archived from the original on 17 August 2011.
- Brock, Sebastian P. (2006). Fire from Heaven: Studies in Syriac Theology and Liturgy. Aldershot: Ashgate. ISBN 9780754659082.
- Forrest, George W. (1887). Selections from the Letters, Despatches, and Other State Papers Preserved in the Bombay Secretariat. Vol. 2. Bombay: Government Central Press.
- Fredriksen, Paula (2024). Ancient Christianities: The First Five Hundred Years. Princeton University Press. ISBN 9780691157696.
- Gaunt, D; Beṯ-Şawoce, J (2006), Massacres, resistance, protectors: Muslim-Christian relations in Eastern Anatolia during World War I, Gorgias Press LLC, ISBN 978-1-59333-301-0
- The Gentleman's Magazine, vol. CIII, F. Jefferies, 1833, archived from the original on 30 October 2021
- González, Justo L. (2010). The Story of Christianity: The Early Church to the Dawn of the Reformation. Vol. 1. New York: HarperCollins. ISBN 978-0-06-185588-7. OCLC 905489146.
- Hall, Richard (2010). Viking Age Archaeology. Shire Publications. ISBN 978-0-7478-0063-7.
- Hammond, Nicholas Geoffrey Lemprière (1967). Epirus: the Geography, the Ancient Remains, the History and Topography of Epirus and Adjacent Areas. Oxford: Clarendon Press. ISBN 9780198142539.
- Hammond, Nicholas Geoffrey Lemprière (1976). Migrations and invasions in Greece and adjacent areas. Park Ridge: Noyes Press. ISBN 9780815550471.
- Kallivretakis, Leonidas (2003). Νέα Πικέρνη Δήμου Βουπρασίων: το χρονικό ενός οικισμού της Πελοποννήσου τον 19ο αιώνα (και η περιπέτεια ενός πληθυσμού) [Nea Pikerni of Demos Vouprassion: The chronicle of a 19th century Peloponnesian settlement (and the adventures of a population)] (PDF). In Panagiotopoulos, Vasilis; Kallivretakis, Leonidas; Dimitropoulos, Dimitris; Kokolakis, Mihalis; Olibitou, Eudokia (eds.). Πληθυσμοί και οικισμοί του ελληνικού χώρου: ιστορικά μελετήματα [Populations and settlements of the Greek villages: Historical essays]. Tetrádia Ergasías (in Greek). Athens: Institute for Neohellenic Research. pp. 221–242. ISSN 1105-0845.
- Koti, Dhori (2010). Monografi për Vithkuqin dhe Naum Veqilharxhin [A monograph of Vithkuq and Naum Veqilharxhi]. Pogradec: DIJA Poradeci. ISBN 978-99956-826-8-2.
- Koukoudis, Asterios (2003). The Vlachs: Metropolis and Diaspora. Thessaloniki: Zitros Publications. ISBN 9789607760869.
- Pavlowitch, Stevan K. (2002). Serbia: The History behind the Name. London: Hurst & Company. ISBN 9781850654773.
- Ramet, Sabrina (1998). Nihil obstat: religion, politics, and social change in East-Central Europe and Russia. Durham: Duke University Press. ISBN 9780822320708.
- Scurry, James; Whiteway, William (1824), The Captivity, Sufferings, and Escape of James Scurry, who was Detained a Prisoner During Ten Years, in the Dominions of Hyder Ali and Tippoo Saib (3, illustrated ed.), Monthly Review Press, ISBN 978-0-85345-315-4, archived from the original on 3 January 2014.
- Skendi, Stavro (1956). "Religion in Albania during the Ottoman rule". Südost Forschungen. 15: 311–327.
- Skendi, Stavro (1967a). The Albanian national awakening. Princeton: Princeton University Press. ISBN 9781400847761.
- Vickers, Miranda (2011). The Albanians: a modern history. London: IB Tauris. ISBN 9780857736550.
- Wand, John Williams Charles (1990). A History of the Early Church to AD 500. Routledge. p. 320. ISBN 9780203131145.
