= January 9 (Eastern Orthodox liturgics) =

Day in the Eastern Orthodox liturgical calendar

Eastern Orthodox liturgical calendar
January 8	January 9	January 10
January 9 O.S. ≍ January 22 N.S. January 9 N.S ≍ December 27 O.S.

An Eastern Orthodox cross

January 9 in Eastern Orthodox liturgical calendars is a feast day and a day of commemoration of saints and martyrs. Although some Orthodox churches use the Revised Julian Calendar and others use the traditional Julian calendar, the fixed commemorations for their respective January 9 are broadly the same, no matter which calendar is used. (Note: Despite the dates being the same, the days to which they refer typically differ by 13 days. The notation Old Style or O.S. is sometimes used to indicate a date in the traditional Julian Calendar (the "Old Calendar"). The notation New Style or N.S, indicates a date in the Revised Julian calendar (the "New Calendar").)

== Feasts ==
- Afterfeast of the Theophany of Our Lord and Savior Jesus Christ

== Saints ==
- Prophet Shemaiah (Samaia, Sameas, Semeias), (III Kings 12:22), (10th century BC) (Russian use only, see also: January 8 - Standard use)
- Martyr Polyeuctus of Melitene in Armenia (259)
- Martyr Antonina of Nicomedia, martyred at sea.
- Martyr Lawrence, martyred in the arena, by the pagans. (Note: Saint Lawrence is unknown in the Synaxaristes and in the Menaia. His memory is recorded however in Lavreotic Codex C 24 f. 112a, where it is stated that he suffered martyrdom in the arena from the pagans.)
- Saint Peter, Bishop of Sebaste in Armenia, brother of Saints Macrina the Younger, Basil the Great, Naucratius, and Gregory of Nyssa, and Blessed Theosebia (c. 395) (Note: Brother of Sts. Macrina, Basil the Great, Naucratius, and Gregory of Nyssa.)
- Saint Eustratius the Wonderworker of Tarsus (821)
- Venerable Basil and Gregory the Wonderworkers, uncles of Saint Eustratius (9th century) (Note: The Venerable Gregory was a monk at the Monastery of Avgaron (Auguron).)

== Pre-Schism Western saints ==
- Virgin Martyr Paschasia, venerated from ancient times in Dijon, France (c. 178)
- Epictetus, Jucundus, Secundus, Vitalis, Felix and seven other Companions - Twelve martyrs in North Africa, probably under Decian (c. 250) (Note: Epictetus was a bishop mentioned by St. Cyprian.)
- Virgin Martyr Marciana of Mauretania, in Mauritania in North Africa (c. 303) (Note: Accused of breaking a statue of a goddess, she was thrown to the wild beasts and gored to death by a bull.)
- Saint Marcellinus of Ancona, Bishop of Ancona (566) (Note: "At Ancona, St. Marcellinus, bishop, who, according to St. Gregory, miraculously delivered that city from destruction by fire.")
- Saint Waningus (Vaneng), Benedictine abbot (c. 686) (Note: Born near Rouen, he became a monk and helped St. Wandrille found Fontenelle. Soon after he himself founded another important monastery in Fécamp in France.)
- Saint Maurontus (Maurontius, Mauruntius), founder of the monastery of Saint-Florent-le-Vieil on the Loire in France (c. 700)
- Saint Adrian, Abbot of Sts Peter and Paul, later called St Augustine's, in Canterbury (710) (Note: "ST. ADRIAN was born in Africa, but was settled in a religious house near Naples, when the Pope St. Vitalian called him to Rome, with the intention of consecrating him as successor to St. Deusdedit, in the See of Canterbury. At the earnest request of Adrian, the Pope accepted St. Theodore in his place, but on the condition that he should accompany him to England, to be his guide through France, which he had already visited twice, and his adviser in the administration of his diocese; lest Theodore, who was a Greek by birth and education, should be disposed to introduce dangerous novelties into the English Church. The Saints were detained some time in France; and when St. Theodore was able to cross the sea, St. Adrian was still obliged to stay, through the jealousy of Ebroin, Mayor of the Palace, who suspected that he might have some political mission from the Eastern Emperor. At length Adrian also reached Canterbury, and, on the retirement of St. Benet Biscop from the Abbey of St. Peter and St. Paul, was appointed to succeed him in his office, a place which he retained till his death. St. Theodore and his faithful counsellor were both men of great learning, in all branches of ecclesiastical discipline, and in their perfect knowledge of the Greek and Latin languages. The benefits of their joint labours were felt throughout the land. Episcopal Sees were multiplied, resident priests established, where hitherto they had not been known, synods held, and Church discipline well settled. One work, in which St. Adrian had a special share, was the establishment of schools, which were eagerly thronged by the youth of England, and spread their benefits far and wide. They had many distinguished pupils, who were as familiar with Greek and Latin as with their native tongue. Among the most illustrious are mentioned St. Aldhelm, Tobias, Bishop of Rochester, and Albinus, who was afterwards Abbot in place of St. Adrian. The Saint long survived St. Theodore, and continued perseveringly in the duties which had been assigned to him, until, after spending thirty-nine years in England, he was called to receive the reward of his labours in the year 710.")
- Saint Berhtwald (Brithwald, Brihtwald), a monk and then the Abbot of Reculver in Kent, and in 693 becoming the ninth Archbishop of Canterbury (731) (Note: "ST. BRITHWALD, or Berctuald, was Abbot of Reculver, in Kent, when, on the death of St. Theodore, he was chosen to succeed him in the primacy of the English Church. Though less learned than his great predecessor, he was nevertheless well versed in the Holy Scriptures, and all other matters belonging to ecclesiastical and monastic discipline. On his appointment he went over to France and received episcopal consecration from Godwin, Archbishop of Lyons, and was not installed till the following year. During his long episcopate of thirty-seven years, St. Brithwald did much in the cause of religion, and many Bishops received consecration at his hands. Though at first opposed to him, he became a friend of St. Wilfrid's, and gladly promulgated the apostolic letters restoring him to his See, using his utmost endeavours to reconcile him with the princes and others, who were hostile to him. At length, worn out with years and labours, St. Brithwald was called to his everlasting rest, and buried near St. Theodore, within the church of the Abbey of St. Peter and St. Paul.")
- Saint Fillan (Foelan, Foellan, Foilan), Abbot of Strath Fillan, born in Ireland, he accompanied his mother, Saint Kentigerna, and his relative, Saint Comgan, to Scotland, where he lived as a monk (8th century)

== Post-Schism Orthodox saints ==
- Venerable Saint Jonah (Miroshnichenko) of Kyiv (Peter in Schema), Wonderworker, founder of Holy Trinity Monastery in Kyiv (1902) (Note: See: (in Russian) Иона Киевский. Википедии. (Russian Wikipedia).)
- Venerable Bessarion (Korkoliakos) of Agathonos Monastery (1991) (see also: January 22 - N.S.)

=== New martyrs and confessors ===
- New Martyr Parthena of Edessa, Macedonia (1375)
- New Hieromartyr Philip II, Metropolitan of Moscow and Wonderworker of all Russia (1569)
- New Hieromartyr Paul Nikolsky, Priest (1943)
- New Hieromartyr Mihailo Barbich, Priest of Krtoli (c. 1946) (see also: January 22 - N.S.)

== Other commemorations ==
- Commemoration of the great earthquake at Constantinople (869) (Note: In agreement with the Synaxarion, on this day early in the reign of Emperor Basil I (867 AD -), a great and terrible earthquake took place during which the great dome of the Church of the Blessed Virgin Mary of Stigmatos (el) crashed down, as well as that of the Theotokos of Phoros. This fact is recorded in Codex 1578 of the National Library of Paris, but is commemorated there on January 10th.)
- Translation of the relics (903) of Saint Judoc, Hermit of Ponthieu (668)

== Icon gallery ==
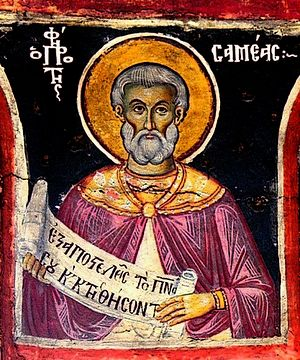
Prophet Shemaiah.

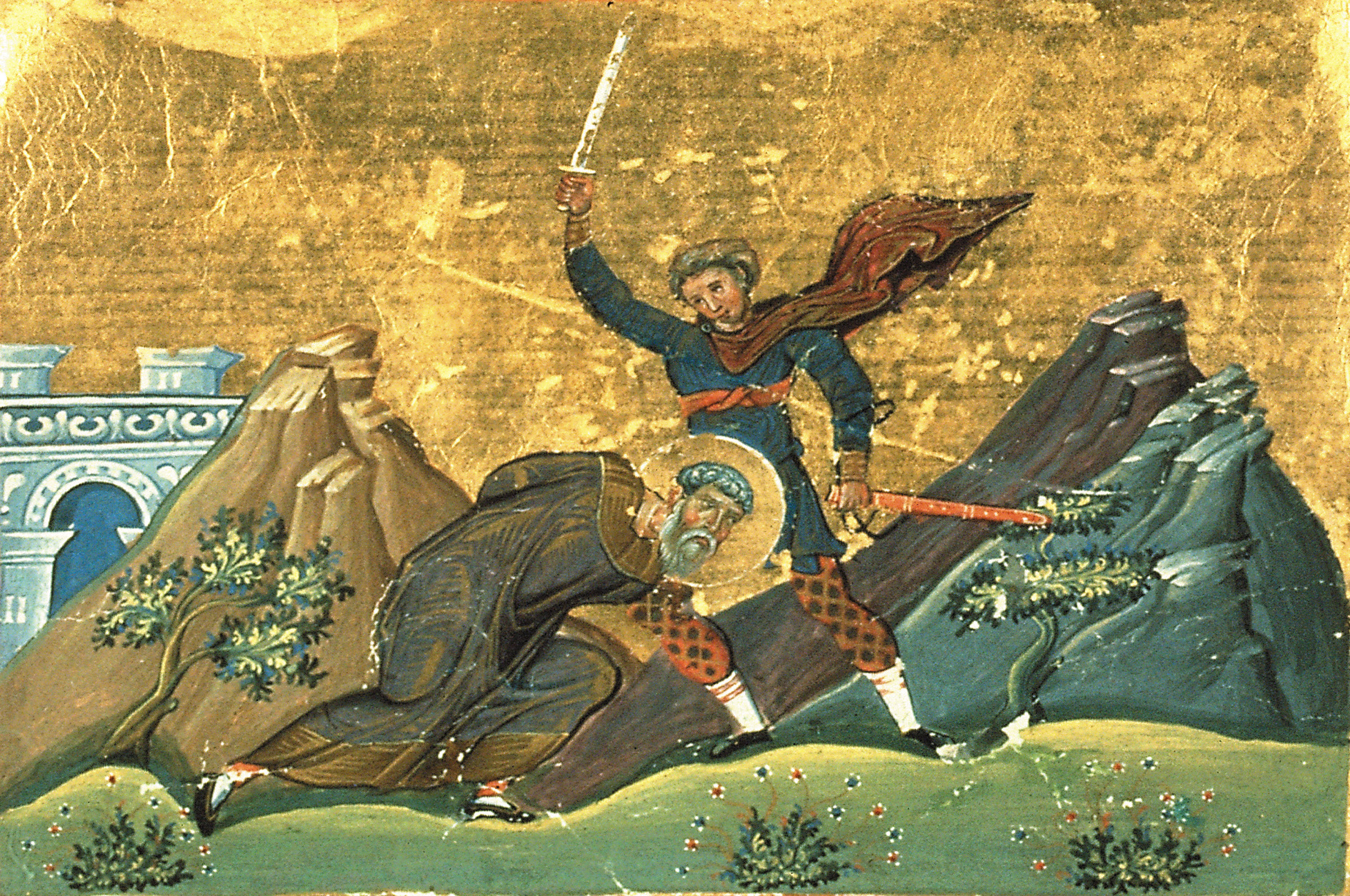
Martyrdom of Polyeuctus of Melitene.
(Menologion of Basil II, 10th century).

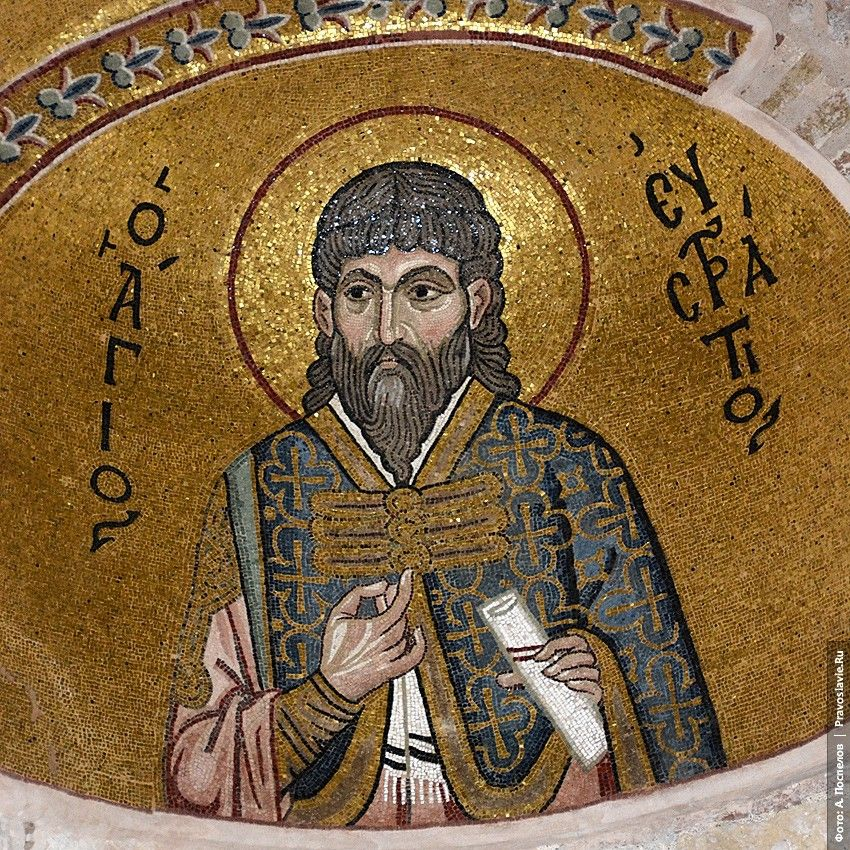
St. Eustratius the Wonderworker.

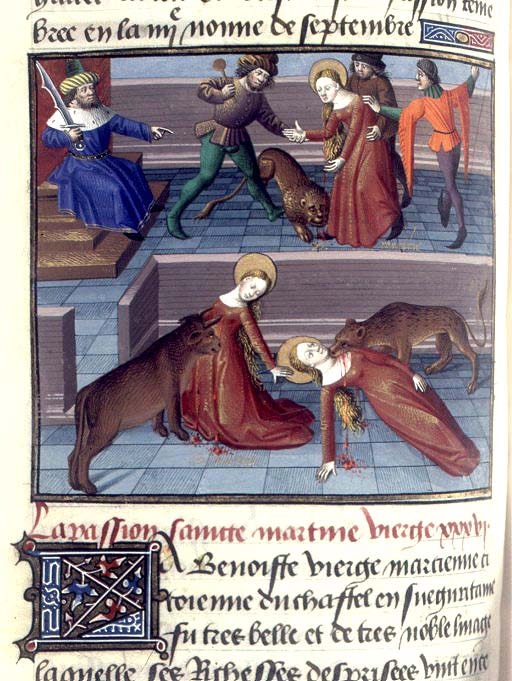
Martyrdom of St. Marciana of Mauretania
(French miniature, 15th century)

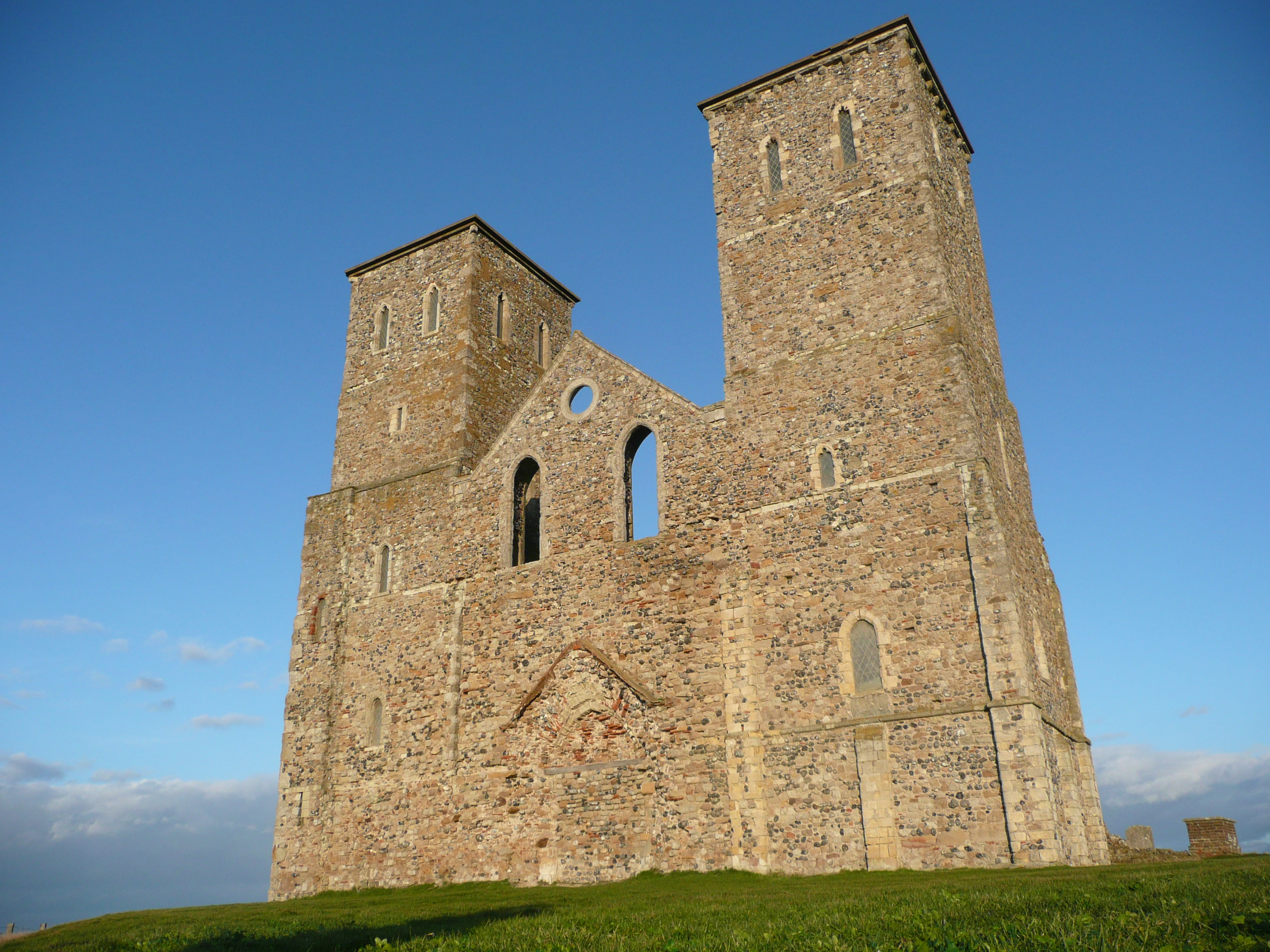
Monastery dedicated to St. Mary, in Reculver, where Saint Brithwald was Abbot.

Saint Foellan's cave, showing structure and altar.

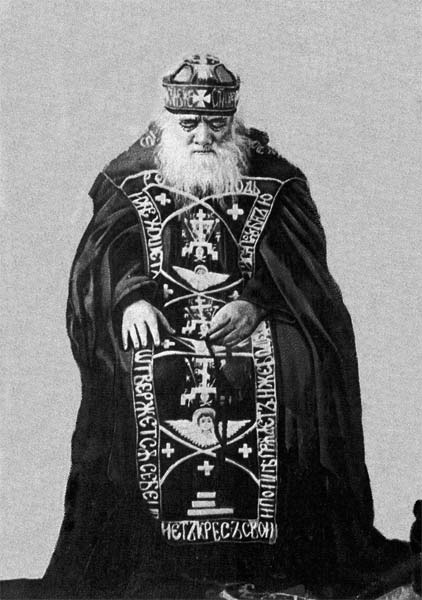
St Jonah (Miroshnichenko) (Peter in Schema), Wonderworker, founder of Holy Trinity Monastery in Kyiv.

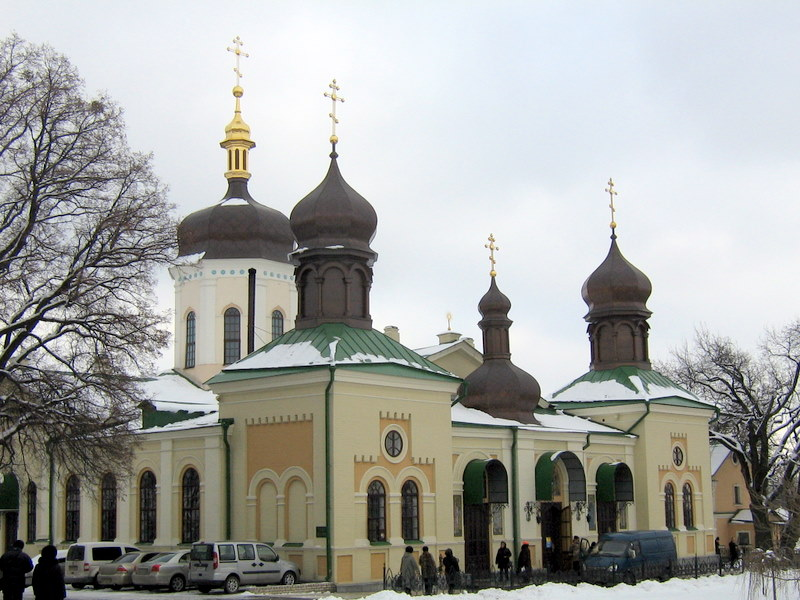
Trinity Monastery of St. Jonas.

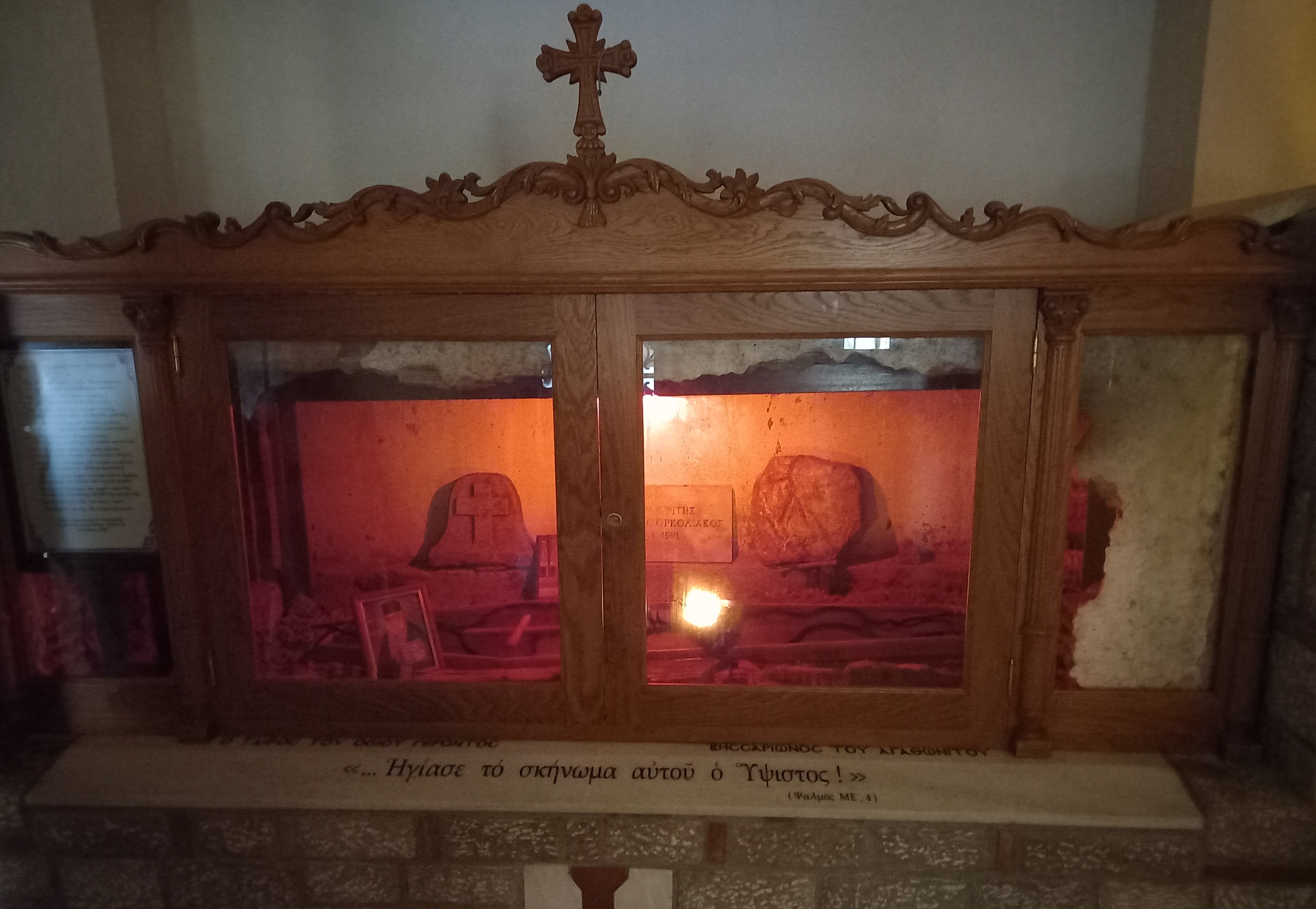
The holy relics of Saint Bessarion the Agathonite, at the Holy Monastery of Agathonos.

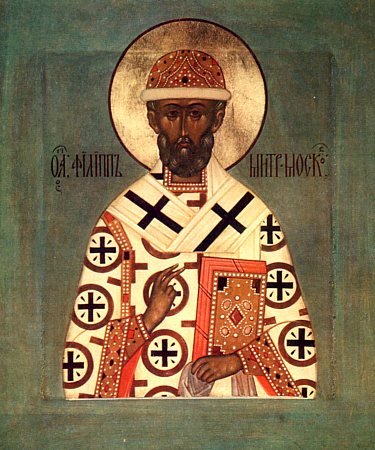
Icon of St. Philip, Metropolitan of Moscow.
(Trapeza of the Trinity-St. Sergius Lavra).

== Sources ==
- January 9/January 22. Orthodox Calendar (PRAVOSLAVIE.RU).
- January 22 / January 9. HOLY TRINITY RUSSIAN ORTHODOX CHURCH (A parish of the Patriarchate of Moscow).
- January 9. OCA - The Lives of the Saints.
- The Autonomous Orthodox Metropolia of Western Europe and the Americas (ROCOR). St. Hilarion Calendar of Saints for the year of our Lord 2004. St. Hilarion Press (Austin, TX). p. 6.
- January 9. Latin Saints of the Orthodox Patriarchate of Rome.
- The Roman Martyrology. Transl. by the Archbishop of Baltimore. Last Edition, According to the Copy Printed at Rome in 1914. Revised Edition, with the Imprimatur of His Eminence Cardinal Gibbons. Baltimore: John Murphy Company, 1916. p. 10.

Greek Sources

- Great Synaxaristes: (in Greek) 9 ΙΑΝΟΥΑΡΙΟΥ. ΜΕΓΑΣ ΣΥΝΑΞΑΡΙΣΤΗΣ.
- (in Greek) Συναξαριστής. 9 Ιανουαρίου. ECCLESIA.GR. (H ΕΚΚΛΗΣΙΑ ΤΗΣ ΕΛΛΑΔΟΣ).

Russian Sources

- (in Russian) 22 января (9 января). Православная Энциклопедия под редакцией Патриарха Московского и всея Руси Кирилла (электронная версия). (Orthodox Encyclopedia - Pravenc.ru).
- (in Russian) 9 января (ст.ст.) 22 января 2014 (нов. ст.). Русская Православная Церковь Отдел внешних церковных связей. (DECR).
