= January 8 (Eastern Orthodox liturgics) =

Day in the Eastern Orthodox liturgical calendar

Eastern Orthodox liturgical calendar
January 7	January 8	January 9
January 8 O.S. ≍ January 21 N.S. January 8 N.S ≍ December 26 O.S.

An Eastern Orthodox cross

January 8 in Eastern Orthodox liturgical calendars is a feast day and a day of commemoration of saints and martyrs. Although some Orthodox churches use the Revised Julian Calendar and others use the traditional Julian calendar, the fixed commemorations for their respective January 8 are broadly the same, no matter which calendar is used. (Note: Despite the dates being the same, the days to which they refer typically differ by 13 days. The notation Old Style or O.S. is sometimes used to indicate a date in the traditional Julian Calendar (the "Old Calendar"). The notation New Style or N.S, indicates a date in the Revised Julian calendar (the "New Calendar").)

== Feasts ==
- Afterfeast of the Theophany of Our Lord and Savior Jesus Christ

== Saints ==
- Prophet Shemaiah (10th century BC)
- Martyrs Julian and his wife, Basilissa, and with them Celsius and his mother, Marcionilla, Anastasius, the priest Anthony, seven brothers, and twenty prison guards, of Antinoe in Egypt (283–305)
- Hieromartyr Carterius of Caesarea in Cappadocia (304) (Note: Saint Carterius lived during the reign of Diocletian, and was a teacher in Caesarea of Cappadocia. He stood before a statue of Serapis and prayed to Christ, and the idol shattered to pieces. The procurator Urbanus ordered St. Carterius to be tortured and then beheaded. Some, however, say he was killed with a spear.)
- Venerable Elias the Hermit, Wonderworker of Egypt (4th century) (see also: January 12 - Greek)
- Hieromartyr Theophilus the Deacon, and Martyr Helladius, in Libya (4th century) (Note: "In Lybia [sic], the holy martyrs Theophilus, deacon, and Helladius, who, after being lacerated and cut with sharp pieces of earthenware, were cast into the fire, and rendered their souls to God.")
- Saint Atticus, Patriarch of Constantinople (425)
- Venerable Domnica the Righteous of Constantinople (c. 474) (Note: See: (in Russian) Домника Карфагенская. Википедии. (Russian Wikipedia).)
- Venerable Agathon of Egypt, Monk (5th century)
- Venerable Theodore of Constantinople, founder and abbot of the Monastery of Chora (c. 595) (Note: Around 529 AD, accompanied by two students, Theoplastos and Timothy, he went to Jerusalem in order to worship at the Holy Sepulchre. Returning to Constantinople he built the Monastery of Chora, with two chapels dedicated to Saint Anthimos of Nicomedia and the Holy Forty Martyrs of Sebastia.)
- Venerable George the Chozebite, Abbot (7th century)
- Saint Cyrus (Kyros), Patriarch of Constantinople (714)
- Martyr Abo of Tiflis, the Perfumer, of Baghdad, at Tbilisi, Georgia (786)
- Saint Emilian the Confessor, Bishop of Cyzicus (820) (see also August 8 - Greek)
- Saint Gregory of Ochrid, Bishop of Moesia (1012) (Note: Saint Gregory was a faithful teacher and shepherd of Christ's flock. An inscription in the church of Holy Wisdom (Hagia Sophia) in Ochrid refers to him as "Gregory the Wise.")

== Pre-Schism Western saints ==
- Saint Patiens, venerated as the fourth Bishop of Metz and patron-saint of that city (2nd century)
- Hieromartyr Lucian (priest, the "Apostle of Beauvais"), and martyrs Maximian and Julian, in Beauvais in the north of France (290) (Note: "At Beauvais, in France, the holy martyrs Lucian, priest, Maximian and Julian. The last two were killed with the sword by the persecutors; but blessed Lucian, who had come to France with St. Denis, not fearing, after the slaughter of his companions, to confess the name of Christ openly, received the same sentence of death.")
- Saint Eugenian (Egemoine), Bishop of Autun, a staunch defender of Orthodoxy against Arianism, for which he was martyred (4th century)
- Saint Severin, Bishop of Cologne (c. 397)
- Saint Severinus of Noricum, Monk of Göttweig Abbey, Apostle of Austria (Austria and Bavaria) (482) (Note: An Eastern monk who enlightened Noricum Ripensis, now in Austria. He founded several monasteries, notably one on the Danube near Vienna, where he organised help for those afflicted by the invasions of Attila and the Huns and where he reposed. Six years after his repose, the monks were driven out and took his relics to Naples in Italy, where the monastery of San Severino was built to enshrine them.)
- Saint Ergnad (Ercnacta), born in Ulster in Ireland, she was made a nun by Saint Patrick (5th century)
- Saint Maximus, Bishop of Pavia in Italy, he attended Councils in Rome under Pope Symmachus (511)
- Saint Frodobert, a monk at Luxeuil in France, he founded the monastery of Moutier-la-Celle near Troyes, where he led a life of unceasing prayer and asceticism (673)
- Saint Nathalan of Aberdeenshire (678)
- Saint Erhard, Bishop of Regensburg, Bavaria (c. 686)
- Saint Albert of Cashel, English laborer in Ireland and Bavaria (7th century) (Note: Patron-saint of Cashel in Ireland. According to some, he had been born in England, laboured in Ireland and later preached in Bavaria. He then went to Jerusalem and on his return reposed and was buried in Regensburg.)
- Holy Virgin Gudula (Goule), patroness of Brussels, Belgium (712) (Note: Daughter of St. Amelberga, she spent much time with St. Gertrude at Nivelles and afterwards lived a life of holiness.)
- Saint Pega of Peakirk, an anchoress in the ancient Anglo-Saxon kingdom of Mercia, and the sister of Saint Guthlac (719) (Note: The sister of St. Guthlac of Crowland in England. She too lived as an anchoress. The village of Peakirk (Pega's church) in Northamptonshire is called after her.)
- Saint Garibaldus (Gaubald), first Bishop of Regensburg (762) (Note: He was consecrated by St. Boniface in c. 740. He had probably been Abbot of St. Emmeran in Regensburg before this.)
- Saint Æthelhelm (Athelm), the first Bishop of Wells, and later Archbishop of Canterbury (926) (Note: Paternal uncle of St. Dunstan. A monk and then Abbot of Glastonbury in England, he became first Bishop of Wells in Somerset and in 923 twenty-first Archbishop of Canterbury.)
- Saint Wulfsige III (Wulsin), a monk whom Saint Dunstan loved as a son, became Abbot of Westminster in 980, and Bishop of Sherborne in 993 (1002)

== Post-Schism Orthodox saints ==
- Venerable Gregory the Wonderworker of the Kiev Near Caves (1093)
- Venerable Gregory the Recluse of the Kiev Caves (14th century)
- Venerable Macarius (Makris) of Vatopedi on Mount Athos and Pantocratoros monastery in Constantinople, Abbot (1430)
- Saint Paisius of Uglich, Igumen of the Protection monastery, near Uglich (1504) (Note: See: (in Russian) Паисий Угличский. Википедии. (Russian Wikipedia).)
- Venerable Elder Isaiah of Valaam Monastery (1914) (Note: One writer (Nemirovich-Danchenko), having visited Valaam, called it the kingdom of muzhiks, pointing to the peasant make-up of its monks. But in actuality he hinted at the holy aspect of the simple Russian peasantry that filled many monasteries with men of God. Such was the unsophisticated ascetic Father Isaiah, hidden from the eye of the world as a simpleton, but in actuality a saint. He went through the usual severe Valaam basic training and, when ripe to be molded by God, he secluded himself in a remote skete cell to face his Master. He never washed the smoke from the stove off his cell walls, he covered his windows so that his cell felt like a cave or a grave. There, in the silence of his dark cell, he became a partaker of noetic mysticism. But he was observable to us only in his severe self-denial, as he endured cold, hunger and pain. It was discovered after his death that his toenails had grown into his boots, a condition which he had endured as an act of asceticism. This was not a deliberate self-mortification, but the result of a man's total preoccupation with visions from above (theona) to the neglect of "all below ".)

=== New martyrs and confessors ===
- New Hieromartyr Isidore, Priest, and 72 companions at Yuriev (Dorpat), Estonia, slain by German Catholic Latins in (1472) (Note: The Priest-Martyr Isidor was priest of the Nikol'sk church in the city of Yur'ev (Derpto, at present Taru in Estonia). According to the terms of a treaty concluded in 1463 between the Moscow Great Prince Ivan III and the Livonian Knights, the latter were obligated to extend very protection to the Orthodox at Derpto. But the Livonian knights broke the treaty and began to try forcing the Orthodox into the Unia. Presbyter Isidor bravely stood forth in defense of Orthodoxy. He preferred to accept a martyr's crown rather than submit to the Catholics. Blessed Isidor together with 72 of his parishioners were drowned in the ice-hole, cut open on the feast of Theophany after the blessing of waters in the River Amovzha (or Emaiyga, now Emajogi). In Spring, during a time of flooding, the undecayed bodies of the holy martyrs, and among them the fully vested body of the Priest-Martyr Isidor, were found by Russian merchants journeying along the River bank. They buried the saints around the Nikol'sk church.) (Note: See: (in Russian) Исидор Юрьевский. Википедии. (Russian Wikipedia).)
- New Hieromartyr Victor Usov, Priest (1937)
- New Hieromartyr Paphnutius Kostin, Hieromonk of Optina Monastery (1938)
- New Hieromartyrs Demetrius Plyshevsky, and Vladimir Pasternatsky, Priests (1938)
- New Martyr Michael Novoselov, ideologist of the Josephite movement (1938) (Note: According to a number of sources, in 1923 he was secretly consecrated Bishop of Sergius, by Archbishop Theodore (Pozdeevsky), Bishops Arseny (Zhadanovsky) and Seraphim (Zvezdinsky). However, according to available information, Bishop Seraphim was under arrest from December 12, 1922, then in exile, from where he was released only in 1925. The supposed consecration is not documented and not officially accepted by the church.) (Note: See: (in Russian) Новосёлов, Михаил Александрович. Википедии. (Russian Wikipedia).)
- New Hieromartyr Basil Arkhangelsky, Priest (1939)
- New Martyr John Malyshev (1940)
- New Hieromartyr Michael Rozov, Priest, Confessor, of Yaroslavl-Rostov (1941)
- New Martyr Ivan Pavlovich Lyubimov, Psalmist (1942) (Note: (in Russian) "Имя мученика Иоанна включено в Собор новомучеников и исповедников Церкви Русской определением Священного Синода от 26 декабря 2006 года. С 2013 года память мч. Иоанна Любимова по неизвестной причине была исключена из календаря Русской Православной Церкви, выпускаемого Издательством Московской Патриархии. Игумен Дамаскин (Орловский) в ходе конференции «Прославление и почитание святых», прошедшей в рамках Рождественских чтений 2013 года, заявил, что исправления в календарь внесены по инициативе Синодальной комиссии по канонизации святых и с благословения патриарха Кирилла.)

== Other commemorations ==
- Repose of Mother Alexandra (Princess Ileana), foundress of the Monastery of the Transfiguration, in Ellwood City, Pennsylvania (1991)

== Icon gallery ==
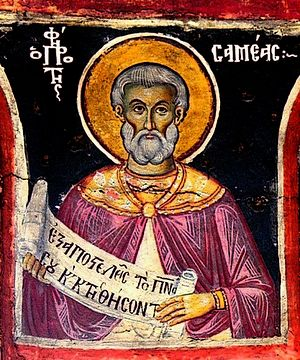
Prophet Shemaiah.

Hieromartyr Theophilus the Deacon, and Martyr Helladius, in Libya.
(Menologion of Basil II, 10th century).

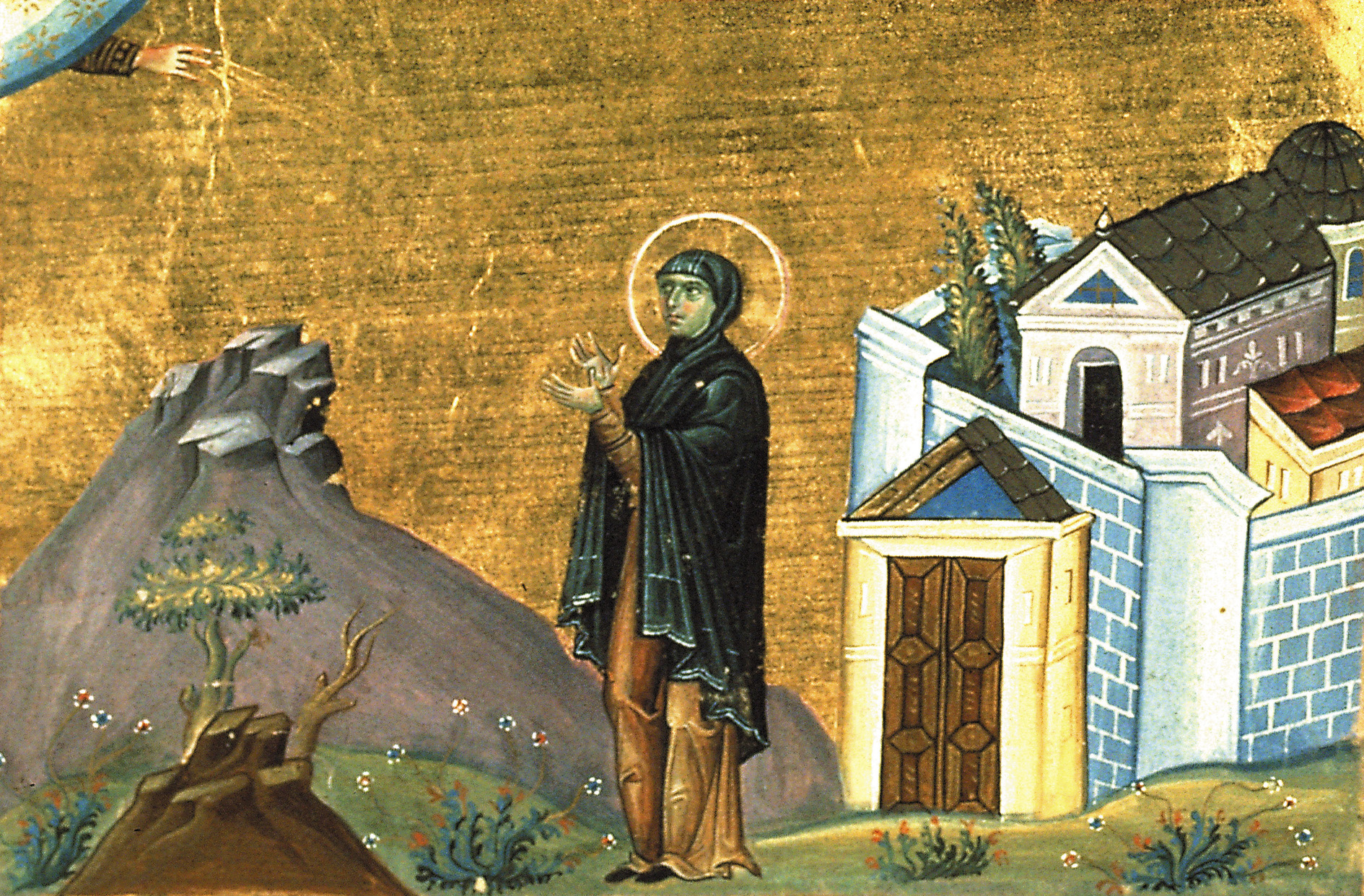
St. Domnica of Constantinople.
(Menologion of Basil II, 10th century).

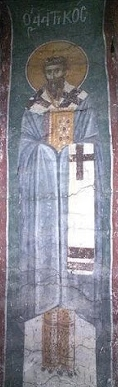
St. Atticus, Patriarch of Constantinople.

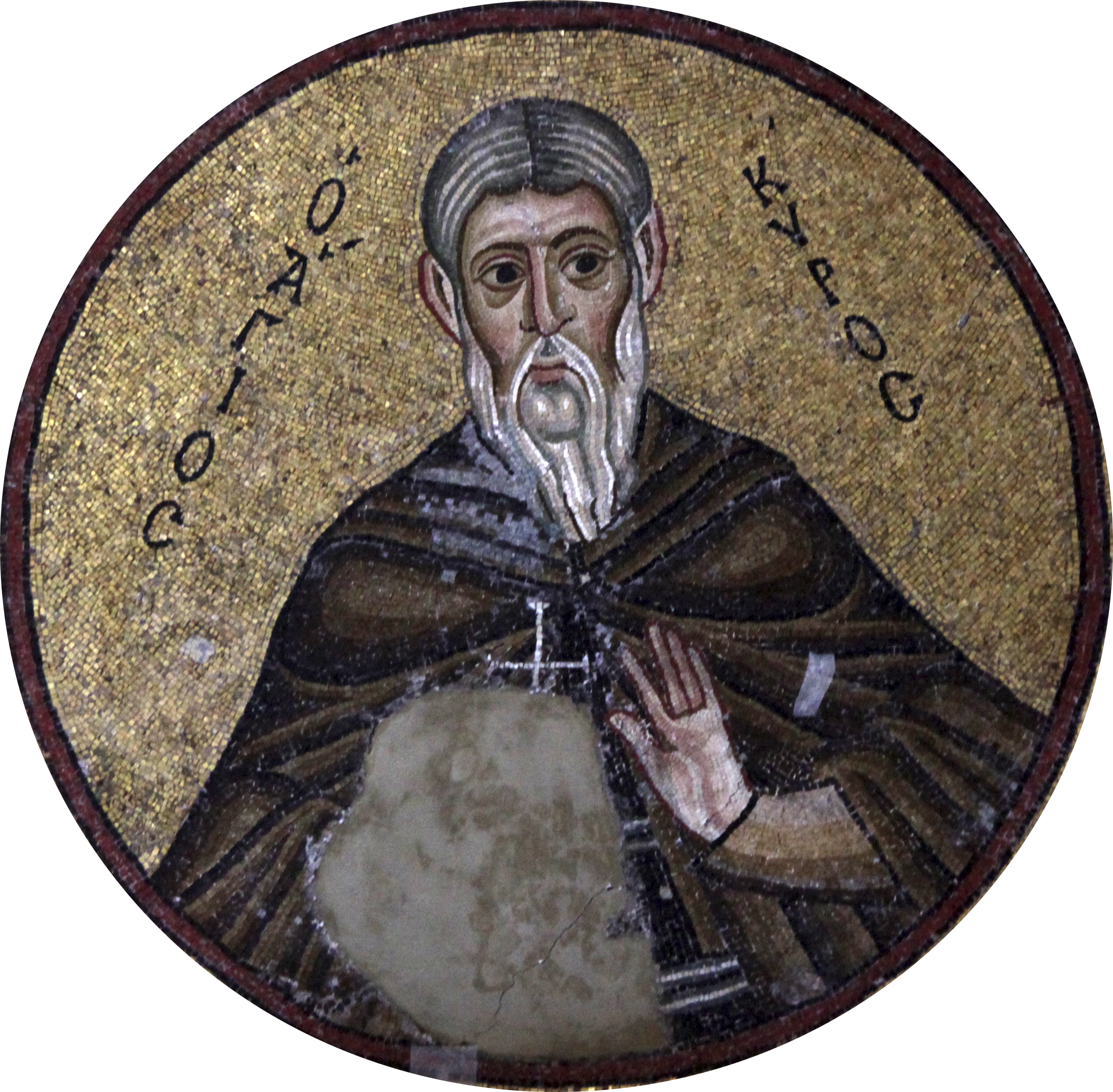
St. Cyrus (Kyros), Patriarch of Constantinople.
(Hosios Loukas).

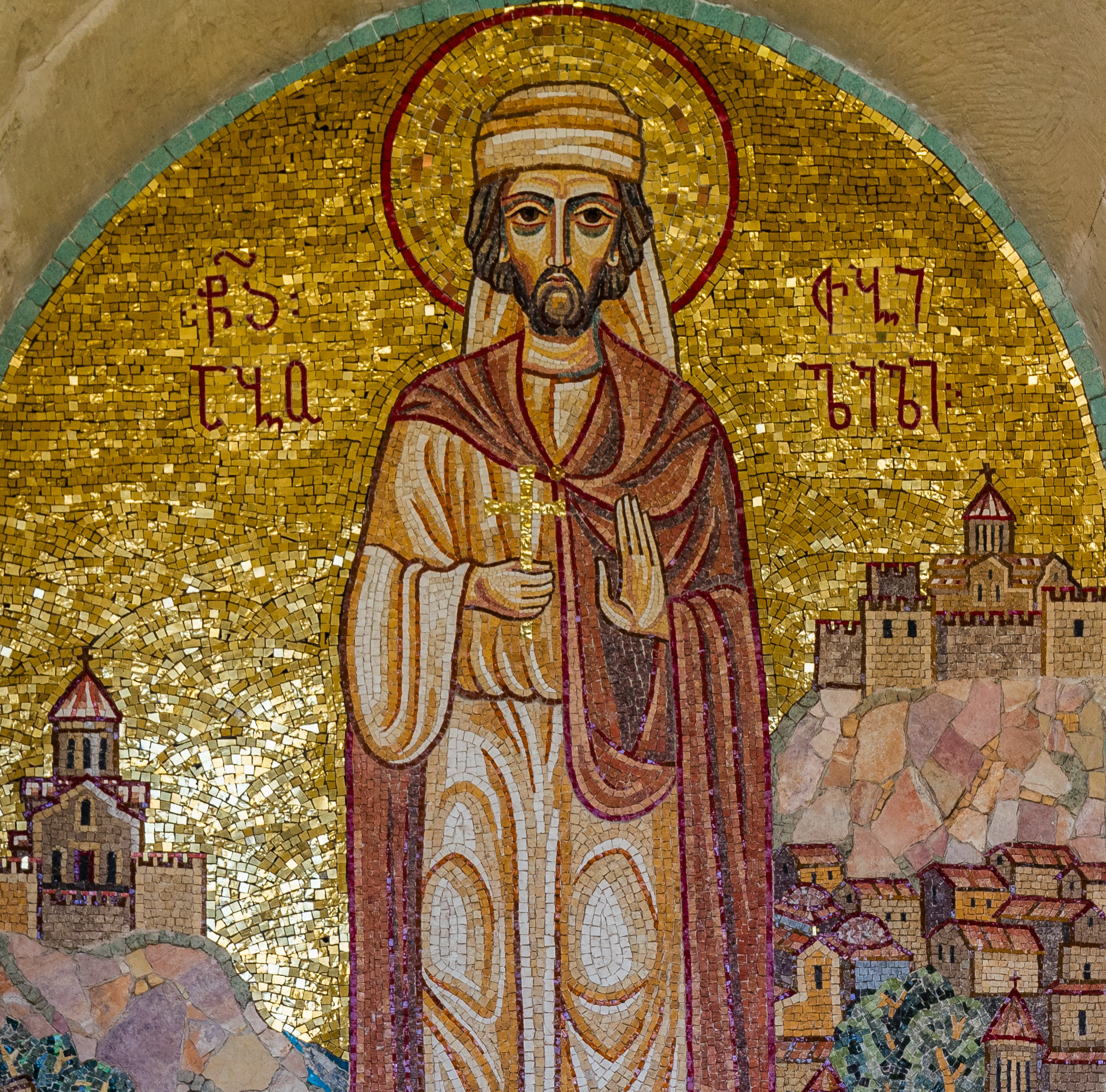
Martyr Abo of Tiflis.

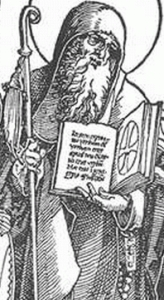
St. Severinus of Noricum.
(Albrecht Dürer).

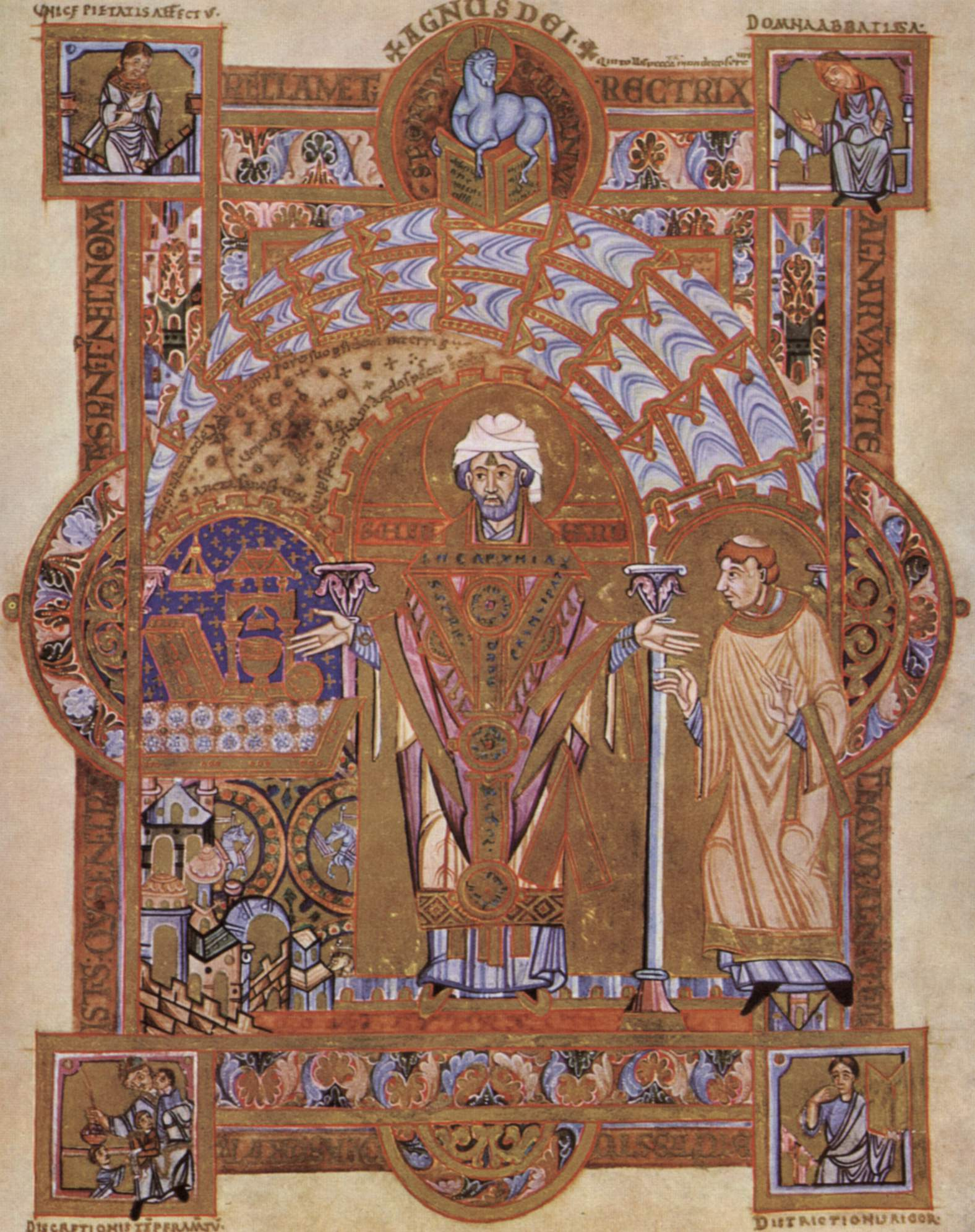
Saint Erhard of Regensburg.
(Uta-Codex, 11th century).

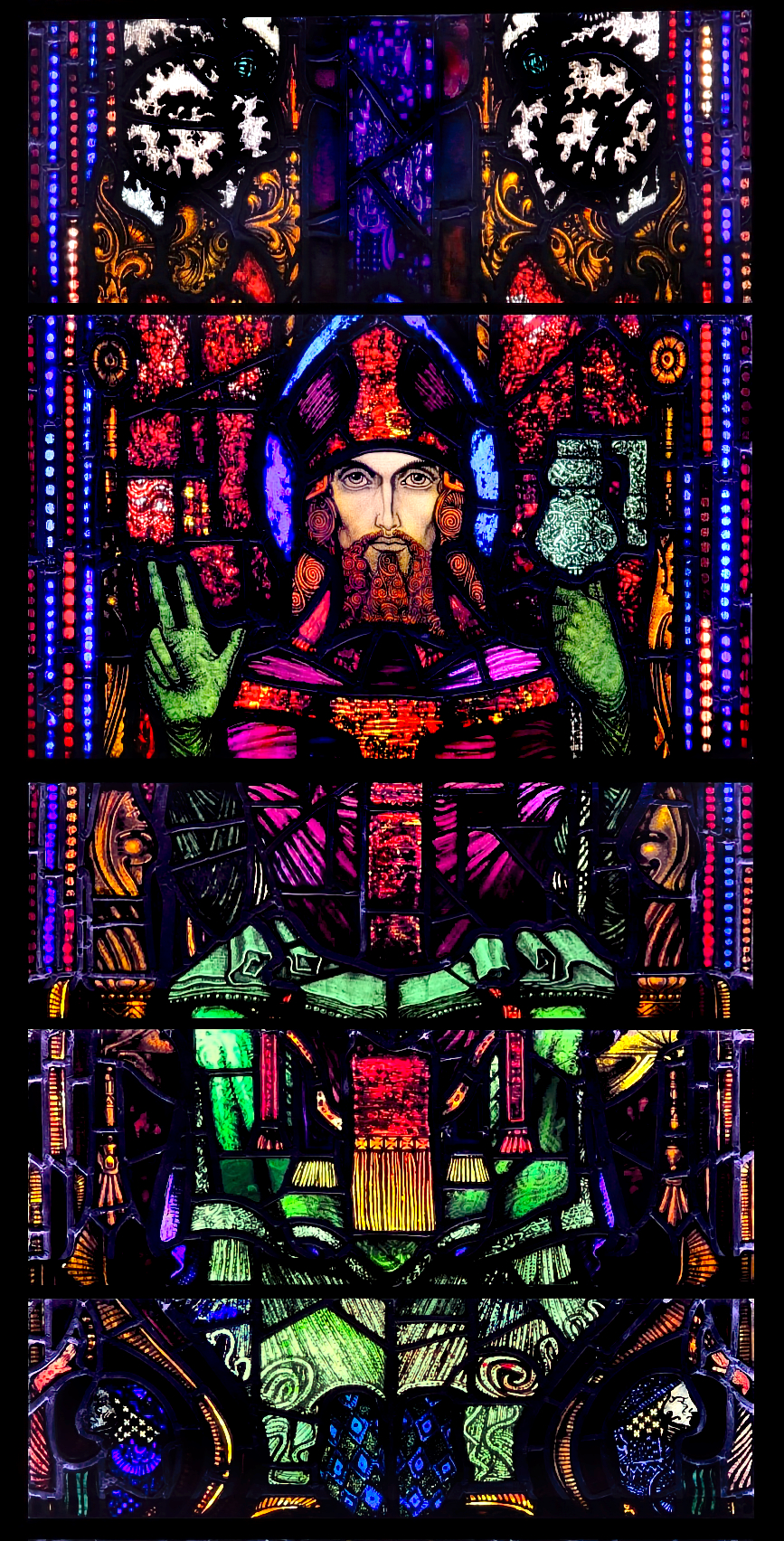
St. Albert of Cashel.

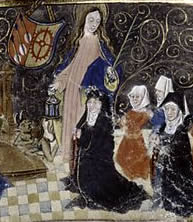
St. Gudula, patroness of Brussels in Belgium
(St. Gudula holds a lantern which a demon endeavors to extinguish).

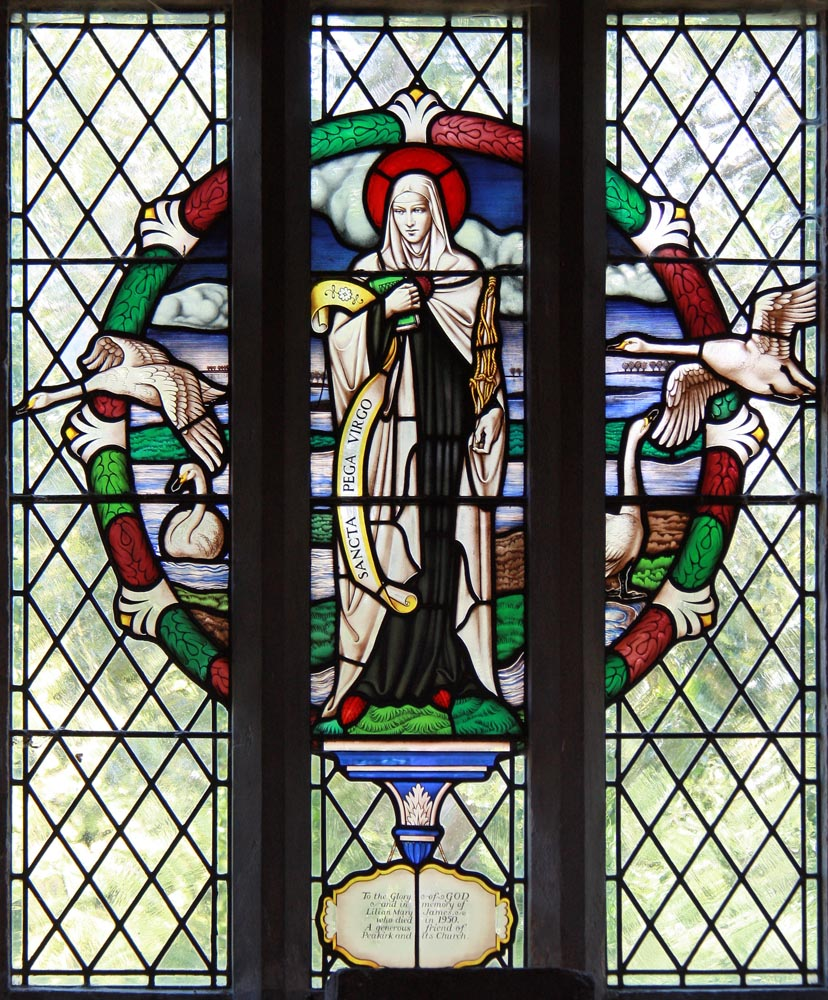
St. Pega of Peakirk, anchoress.

St. Isidore of Yuriev.

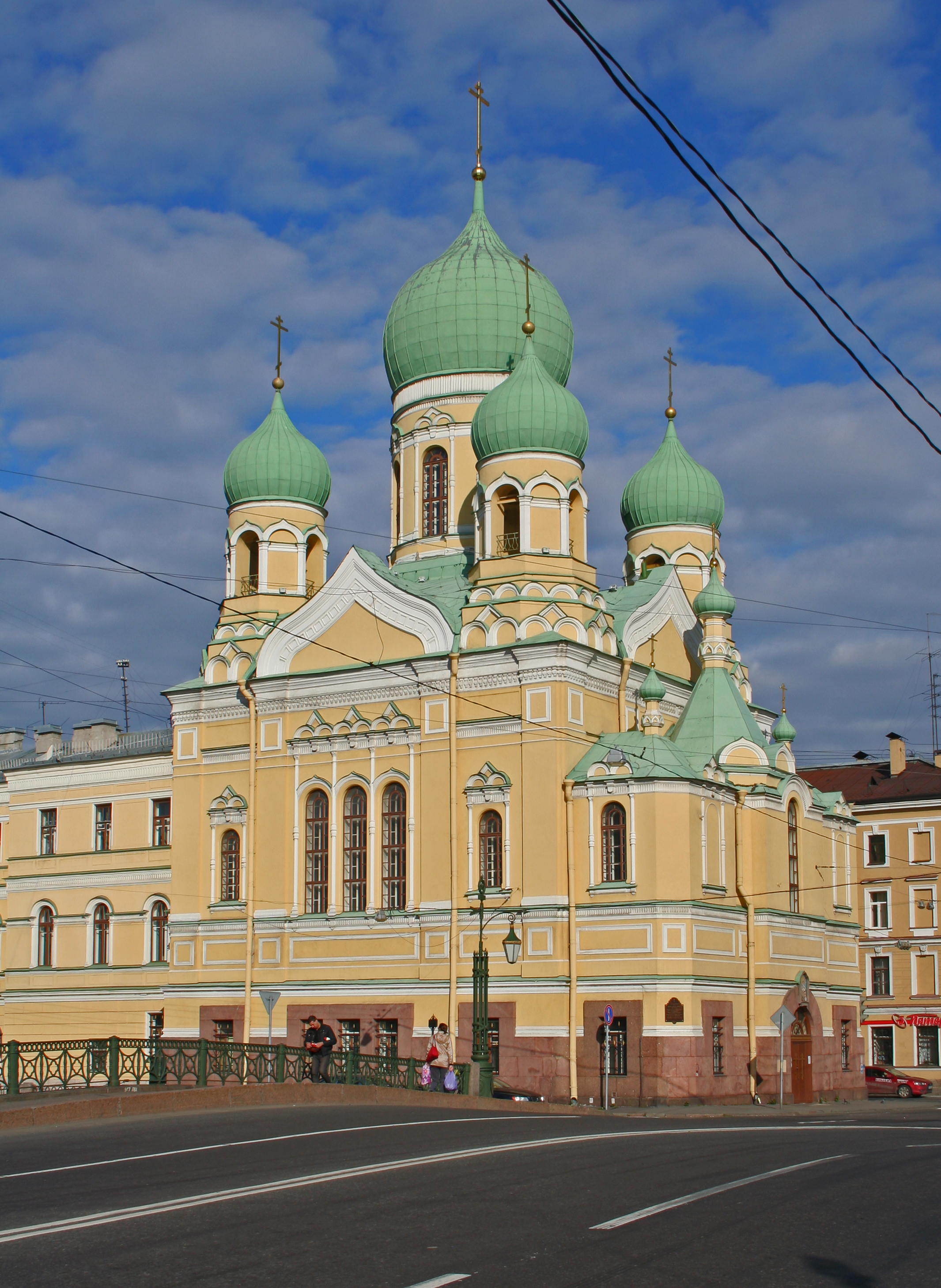
St. Isidore of Yuriev Church, in St. Petersburg.

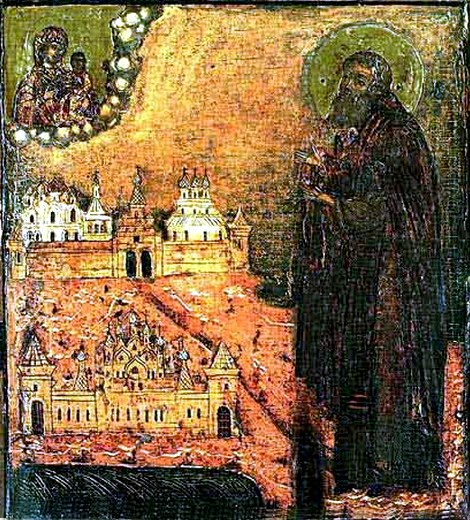
St. Paisius of Uglich.

New Martyr Michael Novoselov.

== Sources ==
- January 8/January 21. Orthodox Calendar (PRAVOSLAVIE.RU).
- January 21 / January 8. HOLY TRINITY RUSSIAN ORTHODOX CHURCH (A parish of the Patriarchate of Moscow).
- January 8. OCA - The Lives of the Saints.
- The Autonomous Orthodox Metropolia of Western Europe and the Americas (ROCOR). St. Hilarion Calendar of Saints for the year of our Lord 2004. St. Hilarion Press (Austin, TX). p. 6.
- January 8. Latin Saints of the Orthodox Patriarchate of Rome.
- The Roman Martyrology. Transl. by the Archbishop of Baltimore. Last Edition, According to the Copy Printed at Rome in 1914. Revised Edition, with the Imprimatur of His Eminence Cardinal Gibbons. Baltimore: John Murphy Company, 1916. pp. 8–9.

Greek Sources

- Great Synaxaristes: (in Greek) 8 ΙΑΝΟΥΑΡΙΟΥ. ΜΕΓΑΣ ΣΥΝΑΞΑΡΙΣΤΗΣ.
- (in Greek) Συναξαριστής. 8 Ιανουαρίου. ECCLESIA.GR. (H ΕΚΚΛΗΣΙΑ ΤΗΣ ΕΛΛΑΔΟΣ).

Russian Sources

- (in Russian) 21 января (8 января). Православная Энциклопедия под редакцией Патриарха Московского и всея Руси Кирилла (электронная версия). (Orthodox Encyclopedia - Pravenc.ru).
- (in Russian) 8 января (ст.ст.) 21 января 2014 (нов. ст.). Русская Православная Церковь Отдел внешних церковных связей. (DECR).
