= Kyros of Constantinople =

Ecumenical Patriarch of Constantinople from 705 to 711

Saint Kyros of Constantinople
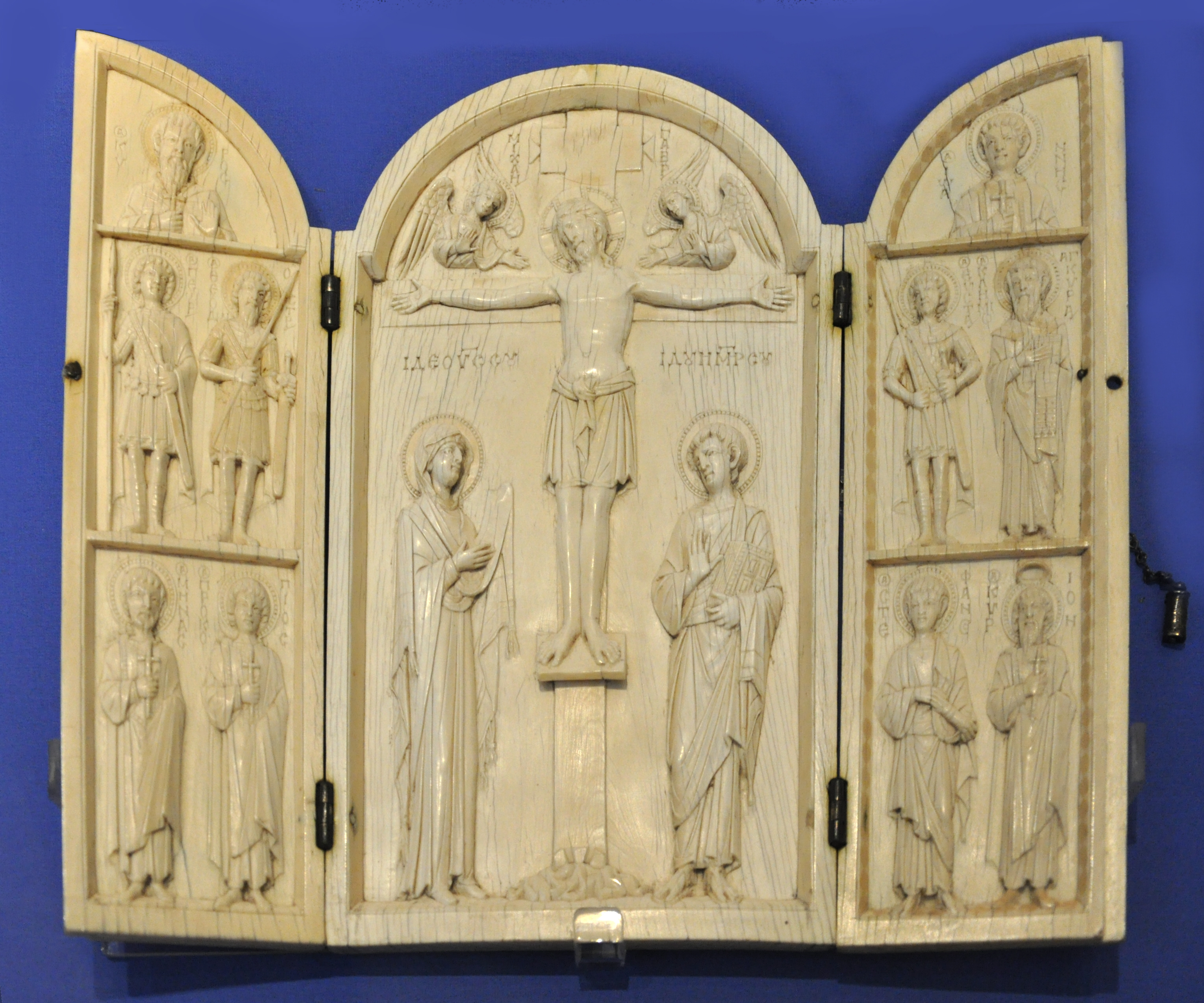
- The Borradaile Triptych, ivory, Constantinople, c. 900–1000 AD (bequeathed by C. Borradaile).

Ecumenical Patriarchs of Constantinople
- Venerated in: Eastern Orthodox Church; Catholic Church
- Feast: 8 January (Eastern Orthodox Church); 7 January (Catholic Church)

Saint Kyros of Constantinople
- Ecumenical Patriarch of Constantinople
- Installed: September 705
- Term ended: December 711
- Predecessor: Callinicus I of Constantinople
- Successor: John VI of Constantinople

Personal details
- Died: 8 January 712
- Denomination: Chalcedonian Christianity

Kyros of Constantinople (Ancient Greek: Κῦρος; died 8 January 712) was the Ecumenical Patriarch of Constantinople from 705 to 711. He is regarded as a saint in the Eastern Orthodox Church and Catholic Church, which had set his feast for 7 January in Catholic Church and 8 January (21) in Orthodox Church. Kyros was placed on the patriarchal throne in 705 by Emperor Justinian II, as a replacement for the deposed Patriarch Callinicus I of Constantinople. Soon after Justinian II's decline and eventual fall in December 711, Kyros was replaced by the new Emperor Philippicus with Patriarch John VI of Constantinople, who shared Philippicus' Monothelite sympathies.

== Bibliography ==
- Oxford Dictionary of Byzantium, Oxford University Press, 1991.

== See also ==
- Eastern Orthodoxy

Titles of Chalcedonian Christianity
Preceded by Callinicus I	Ecumenical Patriarch of Constantinople; 706 – 711	Succeeded by John VI
