= Callinicus I of Constantinople =

Ecumenical Patriarch of Constantinople from 693 to 705

Saint Callinicus I of Constantinople
- Ecumenical Patriarch of Constantinople
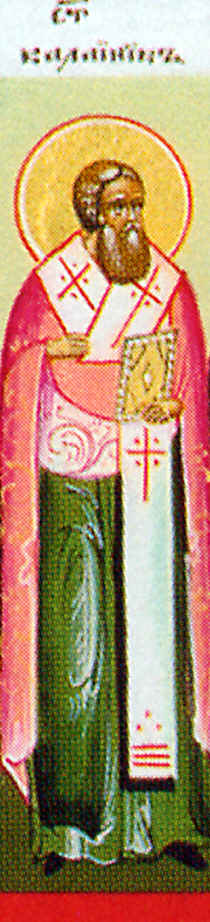
- Icon of Saint Callinicus I
- See: Ecumenical Patriarchate of Constantinople
- Installed: August 693
- Term ended: August 705
- Predecessor: Paul III of Constantinople
- Successor: Kyros of Constantinople

Personal details
- Died: November 711
- Denomination: Chalcedonian Christianity

Callinicus I of Constantinople (Greek: Καλλινίκος; died November 711) was the Ecumenical Patriarch of Constantinople from 693 to 705.

Callinicus I helped to depose Emperor Justinian II and place Leontius on the Byzantine throne.

Upon Justinian II's triumphant return to Constantinople and reinstatement as Emperor, Callinicus I was arrested and blinded before being imprisoned in a monastery.

He is recognized as a saint by the Eastern Orthodox Church; his feast day is celebrated on 23 August.

== Bibliography ==
- Kiminas, Demetrius (2009). The Ecumenical Patriarchate - A History of Its Metropolitans With Annotated (2009 ed.). Wildside Press. ISBN 978-1-4344-5876-6. - Total pages: 256

Titles of Chalcedonian Christianity
| Preceded by Paul III | Ecumenical Patriarch of Constantinople; 693 – 705 | Succeeded by Kyros |
