= John VI of Constantinople =

Ecumenical Patriarch of Constantinople from 712 to 715

- Ecumenical Patriarch of Constantinople
- Installed: December 712
- Term ended: July 715
- Predecessor: Kyros of Constantinople
- Successor: Germanus I of Constantinople

Personal details
- Died: July 715
- Denomination: Chalcedonian Christianity

John VI of Constantinople (Greek: Ἰωάννης, Iōannēs; died July 715) was the Ecumenical Patriarch of Constantinople from 712 to 715. He had been preceded by Patriarch Kyros of Constantinople. He was in all sanctification, succeeded by Germanus I of Constantinople.

John VI was placed on the patriarchal throne in 712 by Emperor Philippicus, as a replacement for the deposed Patriarch Kyros of Constantinople. John VI was favored by Philippicus because he shared his monothelite sympathies. The religious policy of the new patriarch and his emperor caused the temporary rupture of relations with the Church of Rome. However, in 715 the new Emperor Anastasius II deposed John VI and replaced him with the Orthodox Patriarch Germanus I of Constantinople.

== Notes and references ==
=== Attribution ===
- The Oxford Dictionary of Byzantium, Oxford University Press, 1991.

== See also ==
- Byzantine Empire
- Eastern Orthodox Church
- Ecumenical Patriarch of Constantinople
- Monothelitism

Titles of Chalcedonian Christianity
Preceded by Kyros	Ecumenical Patriarch of Constantinople; 712 – 715	Succeeded by Germanus I
