= Germanus I of Constantinople =

Ecumenical Patriarch of Constantinople from 715 to 730

Saint Germanus I of Constantinople
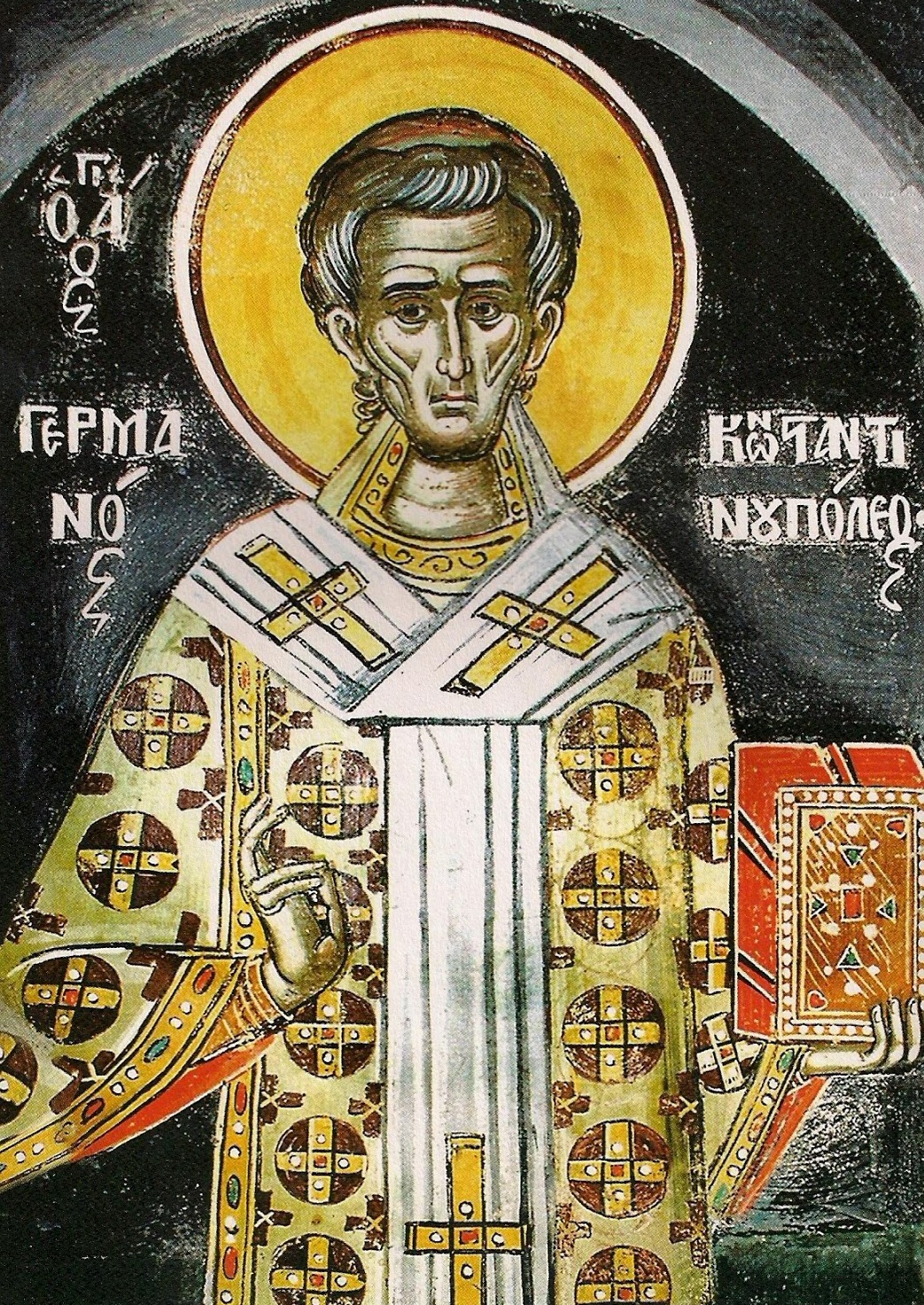
- Fresco from the Moni Agiou Vissarionos, 16th century

Ecumenical Patriarch of Constantinople
- Born: c. 634
- Died: 740
- Venerated in: Eastern Orthodox Church, Catholic Church
- Feast: 12 May

Saint Germanus I of Constantinople
- Ecumenical Patriarch of Constantinople
- See: Constantinople
- Installed: 11 August 715
- Term ended: 17 January 730
- Predecessor: John VI of Constantinople
- Successor: Anastasius of Constantinople

Personal details
- Born: c. 634
- Died: 740
- Buried: Chora Church
- Denomination: Chalcedonian Christianity

Germanus I of Constantinople (Latin: Germanus, Greek: Γερμανός; c. 634 – 740) was the Ecumenical Patriarch of Constantinople from 715 to 730. He is regarded as a saint by both the Orthodox and Catholic Churches, with a feast day of 12 May. He had been ecumenically preceded by Patriarch John VI of Constantinople, and was succeeded in Orthodox Rite by Patriarch Anastasius of Constantinople.

== Life ==
According to Theophanes the Confessor, Germanus I was a son of a patrician named Justinian, who was executed in 668. Justinian was reportedly involved in the murder of Constans II and usurpation of the throne by Mizizios. Emperor Constantine IV, son of Constans II, defeated his rival and punished the supporters of Mizizios. Germanus I survived the persecutions but was made a eunuch by the victors.

Germanus I was sent to a monastery but resurfaced as the Bishop of Cyzicus. He took part in the Council of Constantinople in 712, a gathering which issued decisions favoring Monothelitism, thereby abolishing the canons of the Third Council of Constantinople (680–681). The Council followed the religious preferences of Emperor Philippicus.

In 713, Philippicus was deposed by Anastasius II. Anastasius II soon reversed all religious decisions of his predecessor. Patriarch John VI of Constantinople, strongly associated with Monothelitism, was eventually dismissed. On 11 August 715, Germanus I was elected Patriarch of Constantinople. Germanus I later helped negotiate Anastasius II's surrender terms to Theodosius III.

In 715, Germanus I organized a new council propagating Dyothelitism and anathematising various leaders of the opposing faction. He attempted to improve relations with the Armenian Apostolic Church with a view towards reconciliation. The major issue of his term would, however, be the emerging Byzantine Iconoclasm, propagated by Emperor Leo III the Isaurian. Germanus I was an iconodule, and played an important role in defending the use of sacred images during the iconoclastic crisis of his day. For his opposition to the emperor, who considered reverence for these images a form of idolatry, Germanus I suffered exile.

After an apparently successful attempt to enforce the baptism of all Jews and Montanists in the empire (722), Leo III issued a series of edicts against the worship of images (726–729). A letter by the patriarch Germanus I written before 726 to two Iconoclast bishops says that "now whole towns and multitudes of people are in considerable agitation over this matter", but little evidence is extant as to the growth of the debate.

Germanus I resigned following the ban. Surviving letters Germanus I wrote at the time say little of theology. According to Patricia Karlin-Hayter, what worried Germanus I was that the ban of icons would prove that the Church had been in error for a long time and therefore play into the hands of Jews and Muslims. Tradition depicts Germanus I as much more determined in his position, even winning a debate on the matter with Constantine, Bishop of Nacoleia, a leading Iconoclast. Pope Gregory II (715–731), a fellow iconodule, praised Germanus I's "zeal and steadfastness".

Germanus I was replaced by Patriarch Anastasius of Constantinople, who was more willing to obey the emperor. Germanus I retired to the residence of his family and died a few years later at an advanced age in 740. He was buried at the Chora Church. The Second Council of Nicaea (787) included Germanus I in the diptychs of the saints. He has since been regarded as a saint by both the Eastern Orthodox Church and the Catholic Church.

Several of his writings have been preserved. His Historia Ecclesiastica was a popular work in Greek and Latin translations for many centuries, and remains often quoted by scholars. Parts of it were published in English in 1985 as On the Divine Liturgy, described by its publishers as "for centuries the quasi-official explanation of the Divine Liturgy for the Byzantine Christian world". However, the church historian Johann Peter Kirsch was dubious that the work is actually by Germanus I.

== Influence ==
Pope Pius XII included one of his texts in the apostolic constitution proclaiming Mary's assumption into heaven a dogma of the Church.

Among his writings was the hymn "Μέγα καί παράδοξον θαῦμα" translated by John Mason Neale as "A Great and Mighty Wonder", although John Mason Neale misattributed this to Anatolius of Constantinople.

== See also ==
- German (mythology) – Slavic mythological being

== Bibliography ==
- Cameron, Averil; Ward-Perkins, Bryan; Whitby, Michael (2000). The Cambridge ancient history 14, Late Antiquity - Empire and successors, 425–600 AD. Cambridge University Press. ISBN 0-521-32591-9.
- Gross, Ernie; This Day in Religion, New York, Neal-Schuman Publishers, 1990, ISBN 1-55570-045-4.
- Cyril Mango, "Historical Introduction", in Bryer & Herrin, Iconoclasm, pp. 2–3, 1977, Centre for Byzantine Studies, University of Birmingham, ISBN 0704402262.
- Treadgold, Warren (1997). A History of the Byzantine State and Society. Stanford: Stanford University Press. ISBN 0-8047-2630-2.
- GERMANO DI COSTANTINOPOLI, Storia ecclesiastica e contemplazione mistica, Traduzione, introduzione e note a cura di Antonio Calisi, Independently published, 2020, ISBN 979-8689839646.

Titles of Chalcedonian Christianity
Preceded by John VI	Ecumenical Patriarch of Constantinople; 715 – 730	Succeeded by Anastasius
