= Book of Shemaiah the Prophet =

Lost book of the Old Testament

The Book of Shemaiah the Prophet is one of the non-canonical books referenced in the Bible, now lost. It was probably written by the biblical prophet Shemaiah, who lived at the time of Rehoboam. This text is sometimes called Shemaiah the Prophet or The Acts of Shemaiah the Prophet.

The book is described at 2 Chronicles 12:15:

"Now the acts of Rehoboam, first and last, are they not written in the book of Shemaiah the prophet, and of Iddo the seer concerning genealogies? And there were wars between Rehoboam and Jeroboam continually."

== See also ==
- Biblical canon
- Lost work
