= Shemaiah (prophet) =

Biblical prophet

Prophet Shemaiah
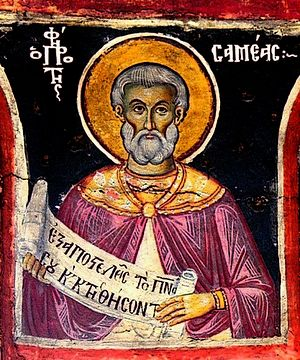
- A Greek Orthodox icon of Prophet Shemaiah

Prophet
- Honored in: Eastern Orthodox Church; Roman Catholic Church
- Feast: 8 January (Eastern Orthodox, Roman Catholic); 9 January (Eastern Orthodox)
- Major works: Book of Shemaiah the Prophet

Shemaiah (Hebrew: שְׁמַעְיָה, romanized: Šəmaʿyā; Ancient Greek: Σαμαία, romanized: Samaia), also known as Samaia or Semeias, was a prophet during the reign of Rehoboam (1 Kings 12:22–24).

He is venerated as a saint in the Eastern Orthodox Church and Roman Catholic Church, being commemorated on 8 January, and additionally in Eastern Orthodoxy on 9 January.

== Biblical narrative ==
According to 1 Kings and 2 Chronicles, the intervention of Shemaiah prevented a war between Rehoboam and Jeroboam after the latter had led the northern tribes of Israel to separate from the tribes of Judah and Benjamin. King Rehoboam had assembled 180,000 troops to forcefully bring back the ten rebellious tribes. Shemaiah was known as a "man of God," and he prophesied in God's words, that "this thing is from Me," and they are not to go up against their brothers, the northern tribes. Shemaiah's words were obeyed and the army stood down. The Pulpit Commentary calls his intervention "a timely reminder of the unity of the race, notwithstanding the division of the kingdom".

2 Chronicles further states that Shemaiah prophesied the punishment of Rehoboam by Shishak, king of Egypt.
