= Hryshko National Botanical Garden =

Botanical garden in Kyiv, Ukraine

M.M. Hryshko National Botanical Garden
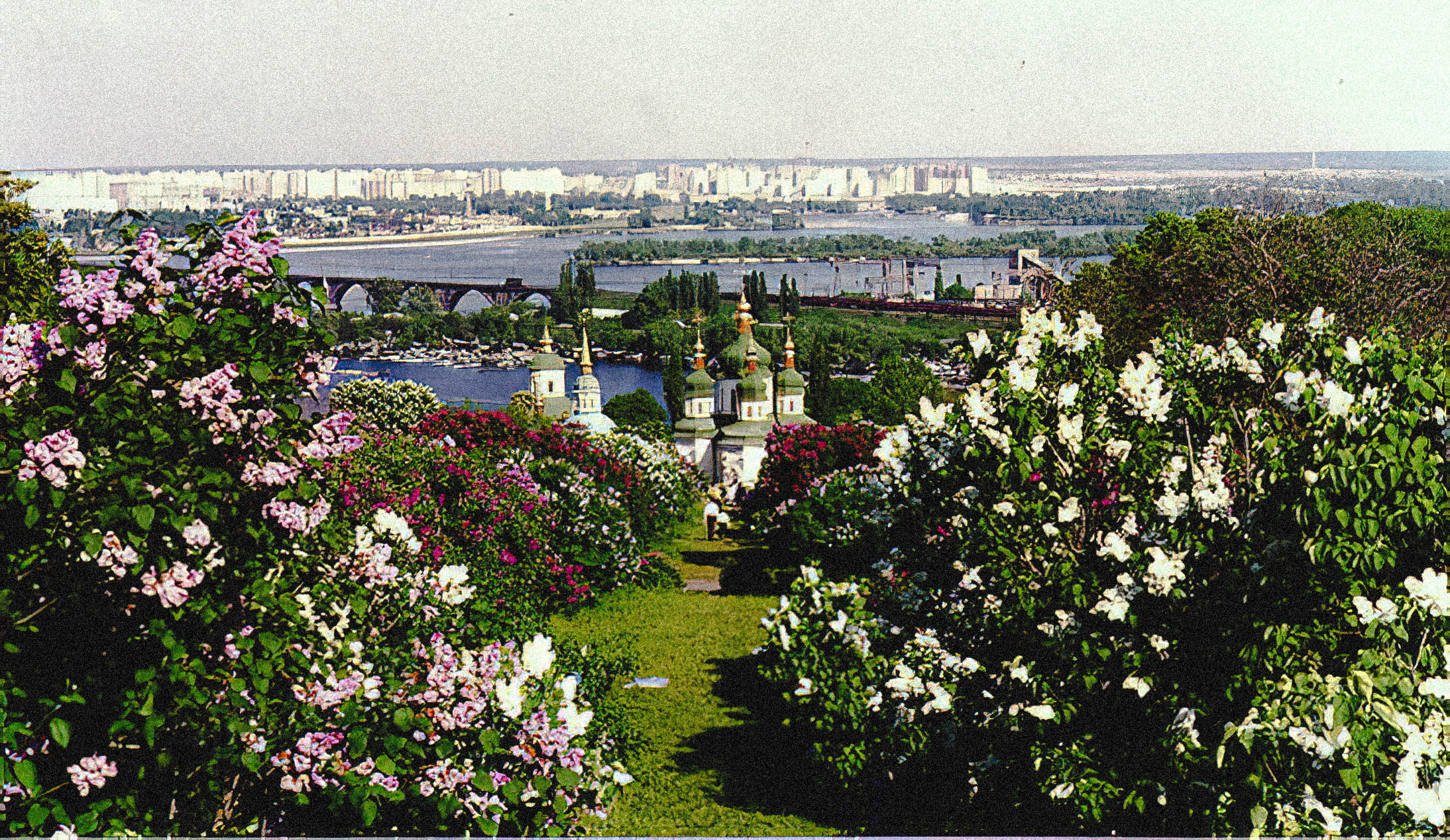
- Lilacs at the M.M. Hryshko National Botanical Garden

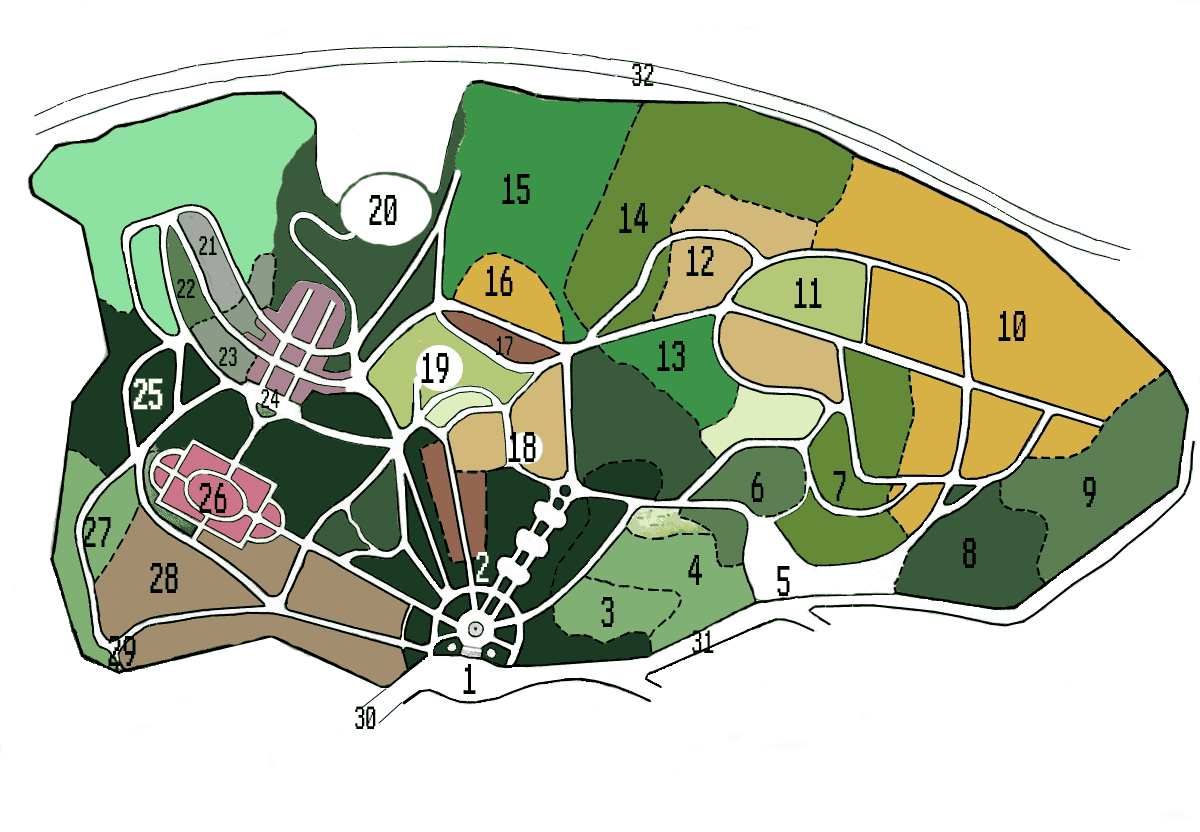
- Layout of the botanical garden
- Location: Pecherskyi District, Kyiv, Ukraine
- Coordinates: 50°24′55″N 30°33′45″E
- Governing body: National Academy of Sciences of Ukraine
- Website: http://www.nbg.kiev.ua/en/

The M. M. Hryshko National Botanical Garden (Ukrainian: Національний ботанічний сад імені М.М. Гришка, Natsionalnyi botanichnyi sad im. M.M.Hryshka) is located in Kyiv, the capital of Ukraine.

The M. M. Hryshko National Botanical Garden is a botanical garden of the National Academy of Sciences of Ukraine. It is named after the Soviet botanist Mykola Hryshko who was born in Poltava. Founded in 1936, the garden covers 1.3 km^{2} (120 hectares) and contains 13,000 types of trees, shrubs, flowers and other plants from all over the world. It has many coniferous trees and honey locusts, and flowers such as peonies, roses, magnolias, and bushes including lilacs. The garden has hothouses, conservatories, greenhouses and rosaries. It is the most popular amongst the residents, where one can see exotic plants, and attend flower exhibitions. The blooming lilacs at the end of spring are popular in the central garden.

The Vydubychi Monastery and Trinity Monastery of St. Jonas are located on the grounds of the botanical gardens.

The territory of the garden is divided into floristic complexes, such as Ukrainian Carpathians, Plains of Ukraine, Crimea, Caucasus, Central Asia, Altai and Western Siberia, Far East. In every zone, plants typical for a particular region can be found. The geography and landscape of each territory were recreated as well. Also, the garden has a large collection of unique and rare tropical and subtropical plants that are represented in the greenhouse. The Botanical garden can impress with more than 350 species of orchids.

In 2012, with the assistance of the Korean government, a Korean traditional garden based on Changdeok was created in the National Botanical Garden to celebrate the twentieth anniversary of the establishment of diplomatic relations between Ukraine and the Republic of Korea.

== Image ==
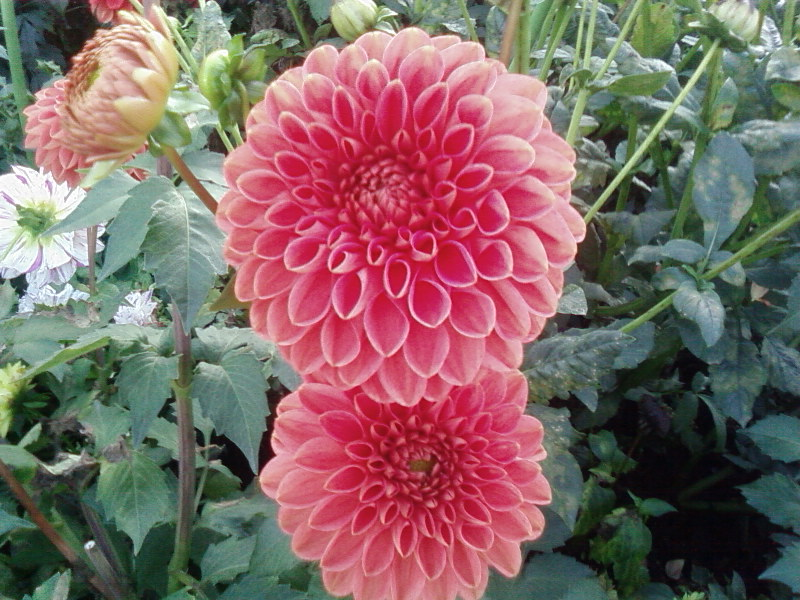

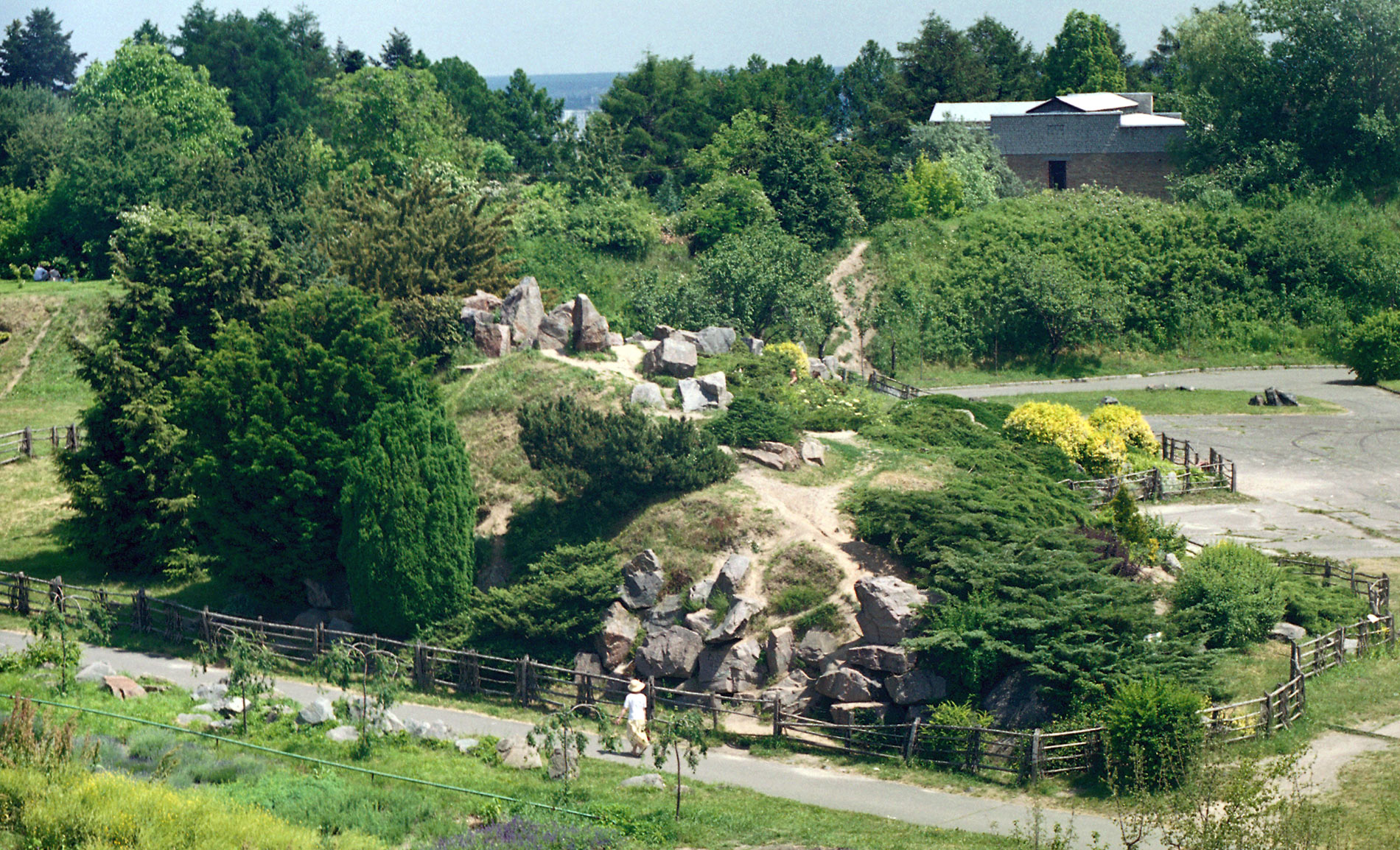

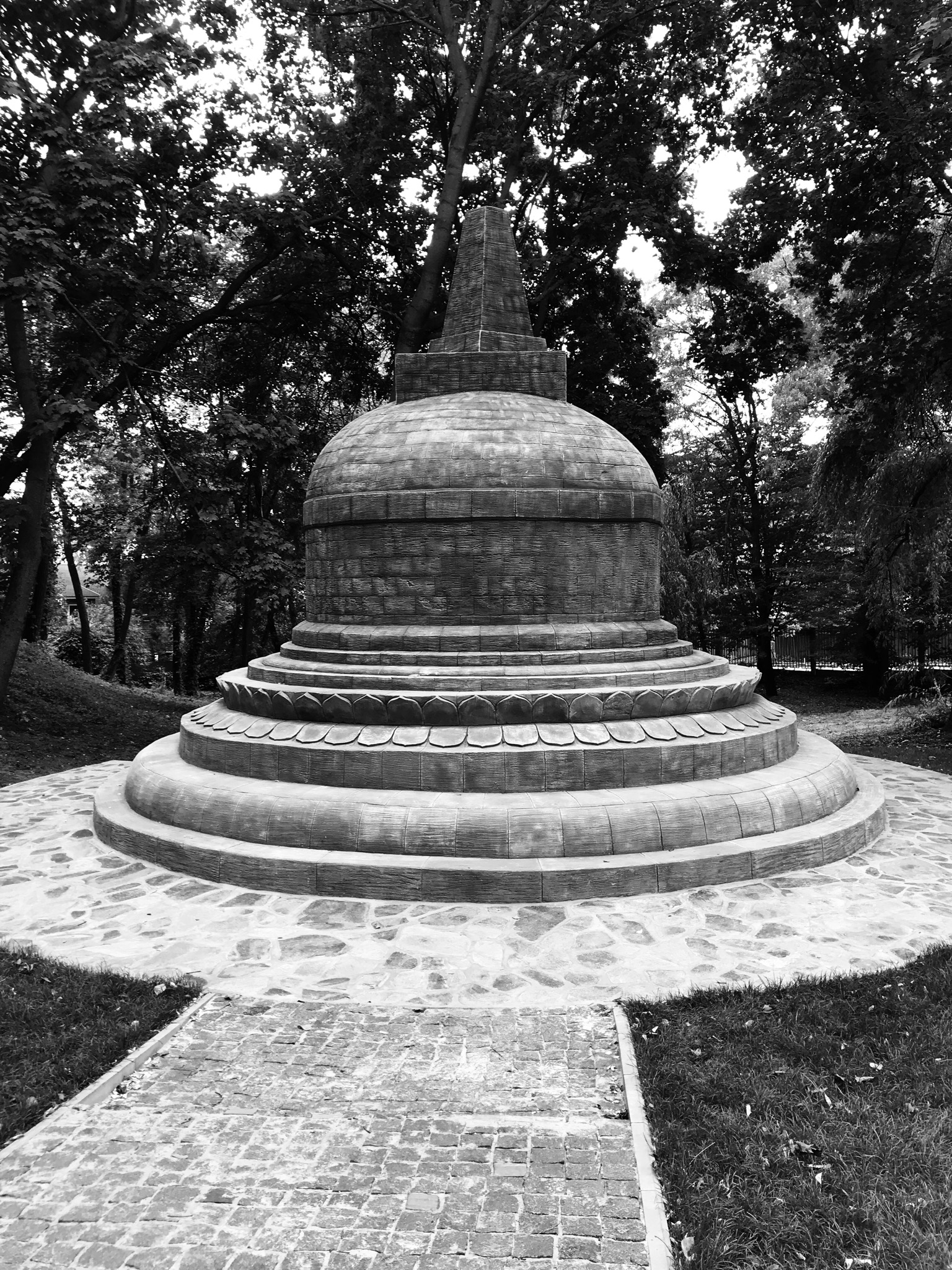

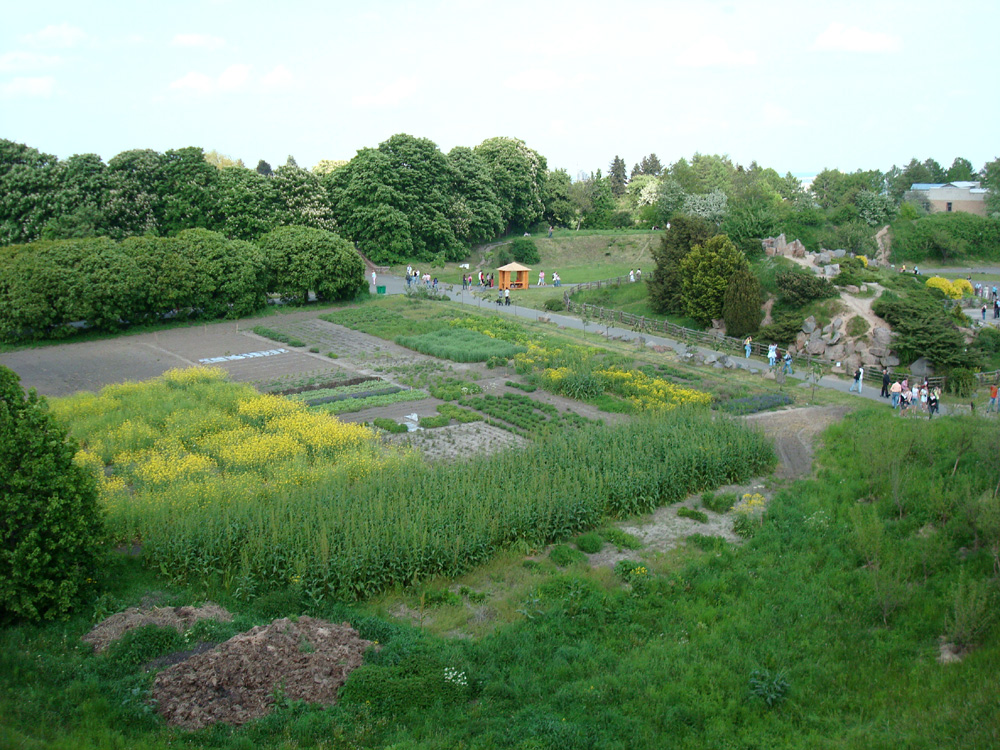

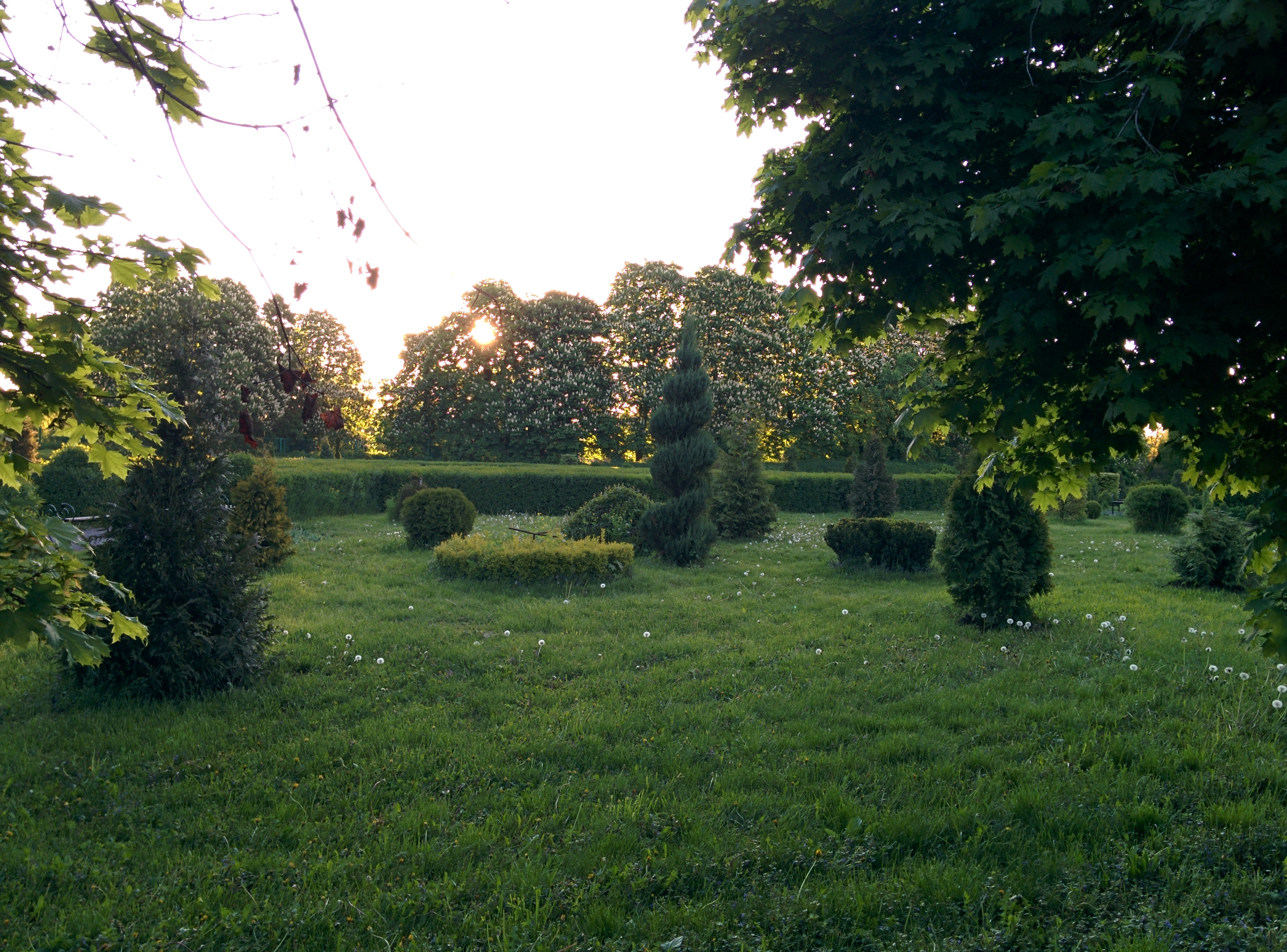

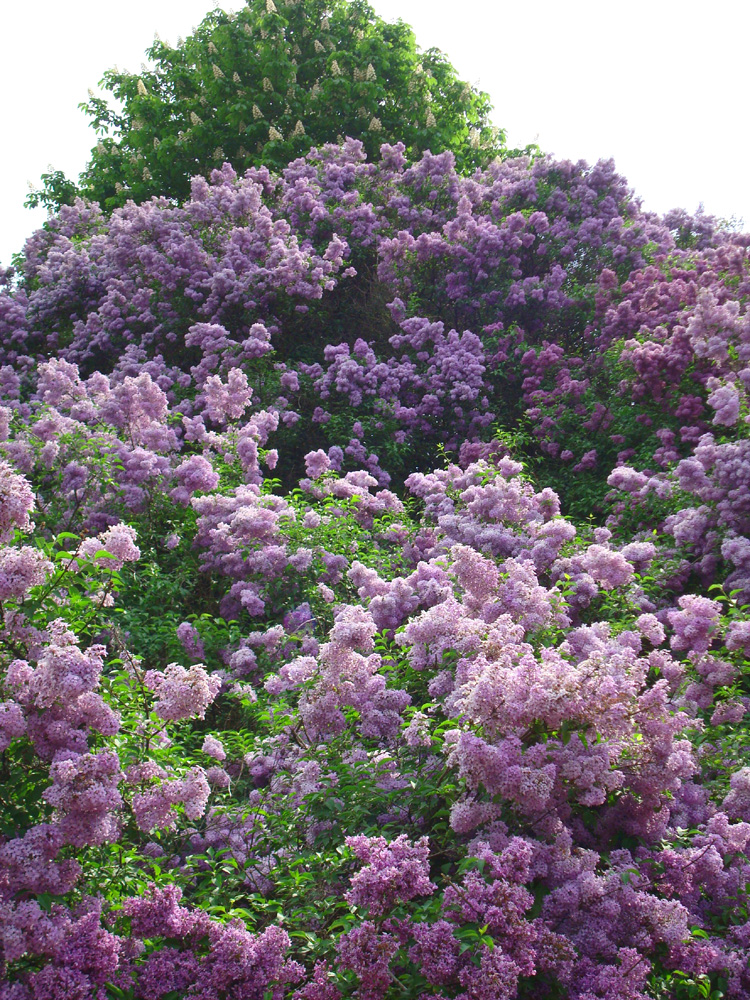

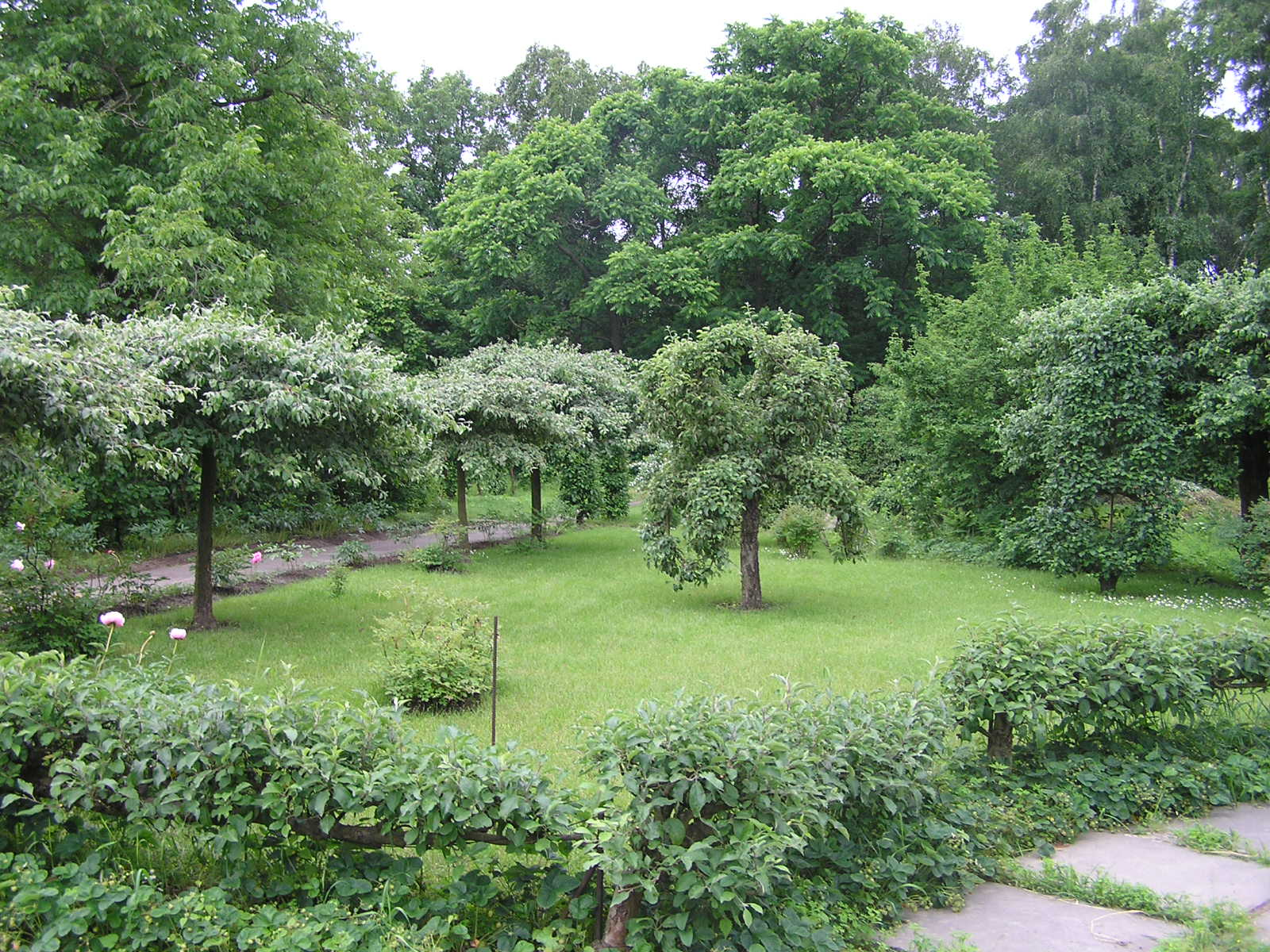

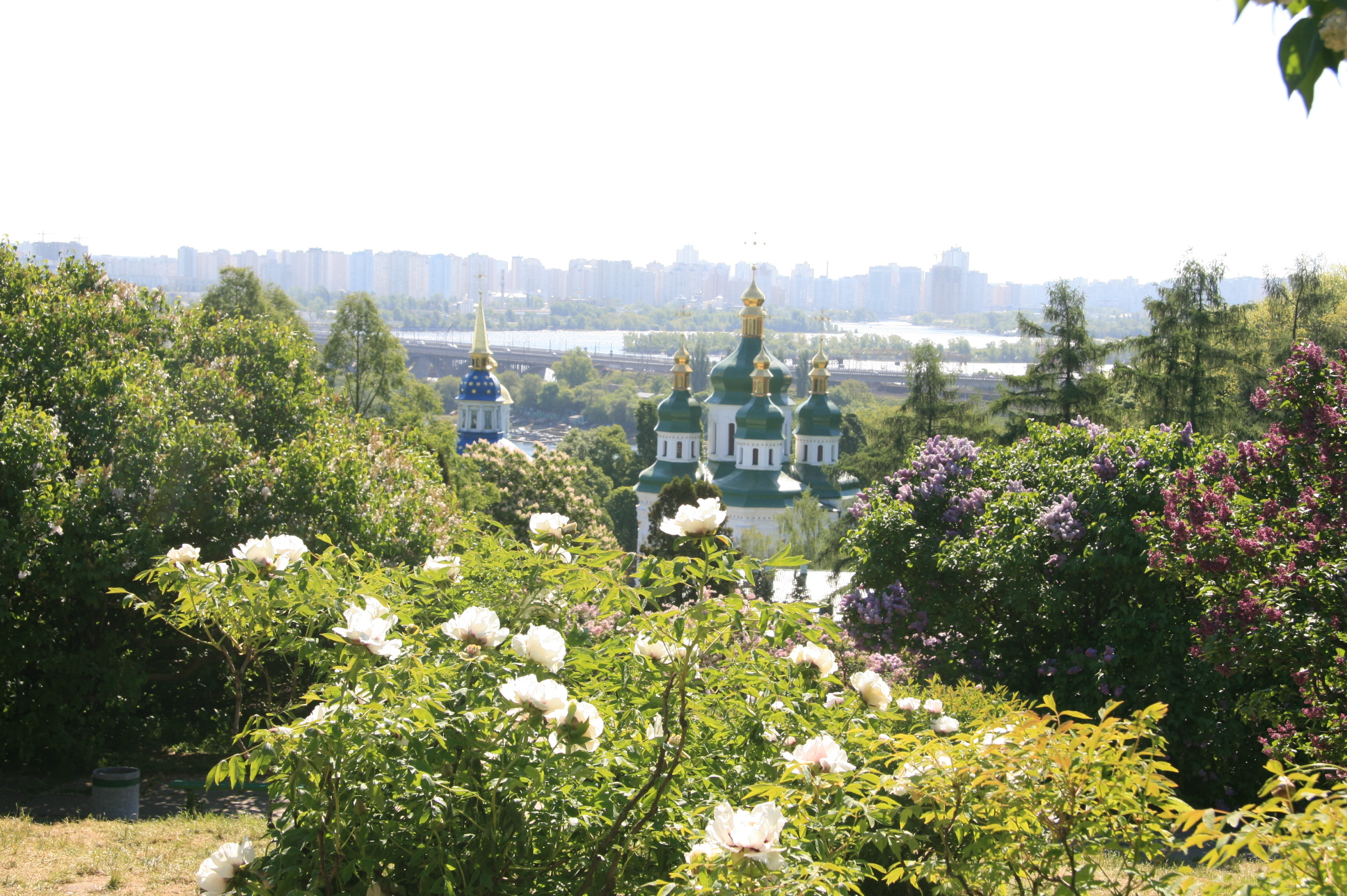

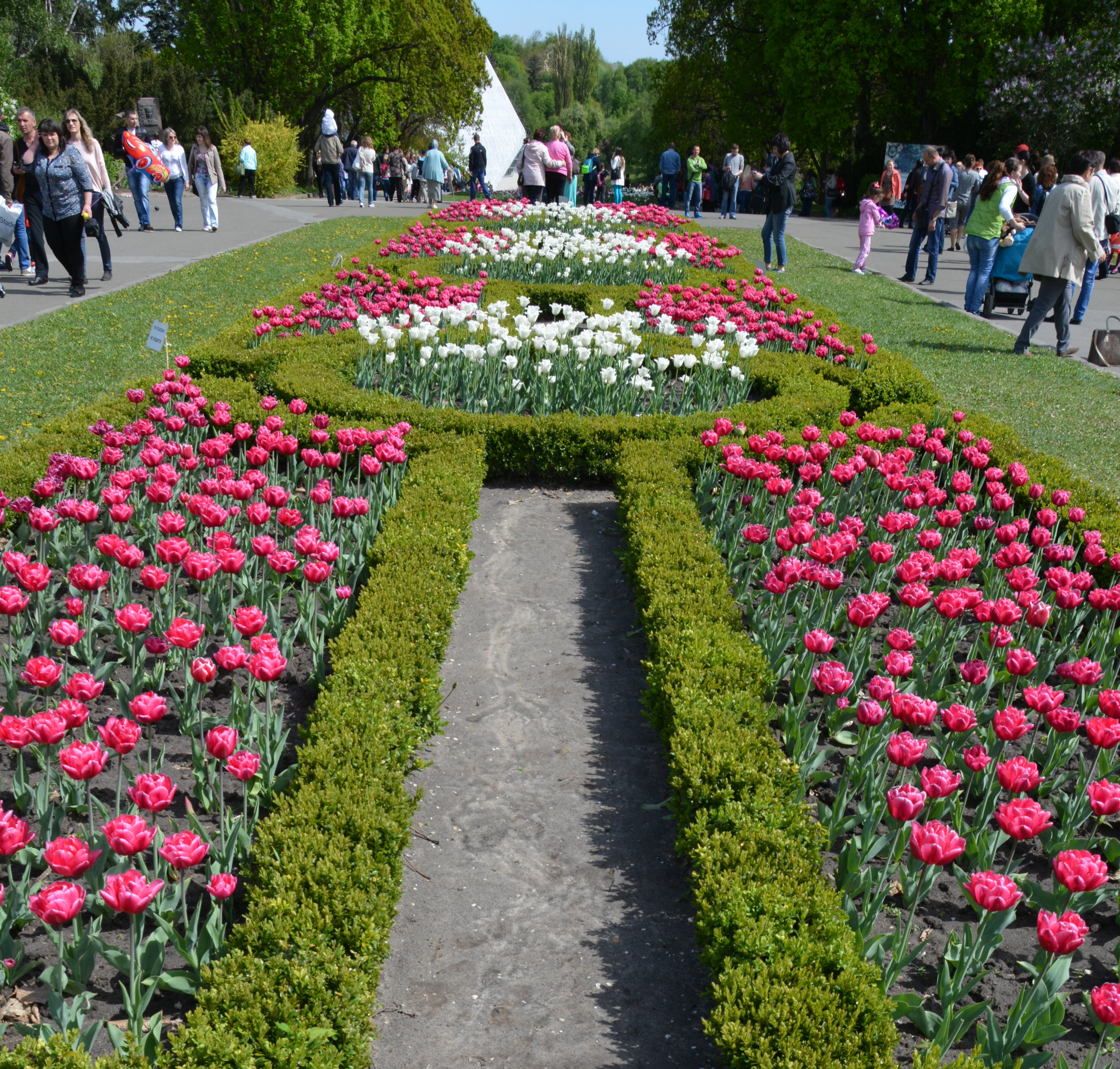

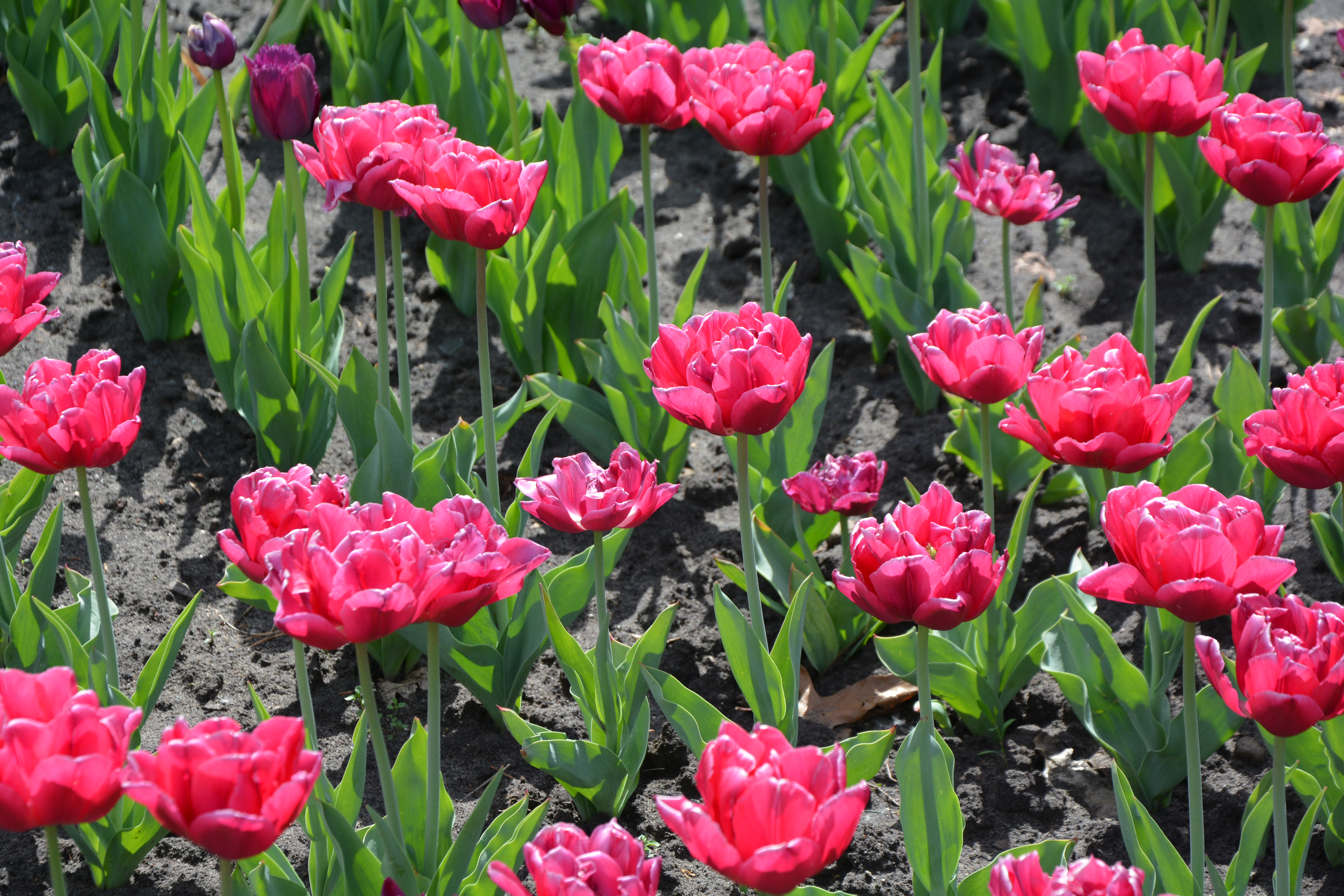

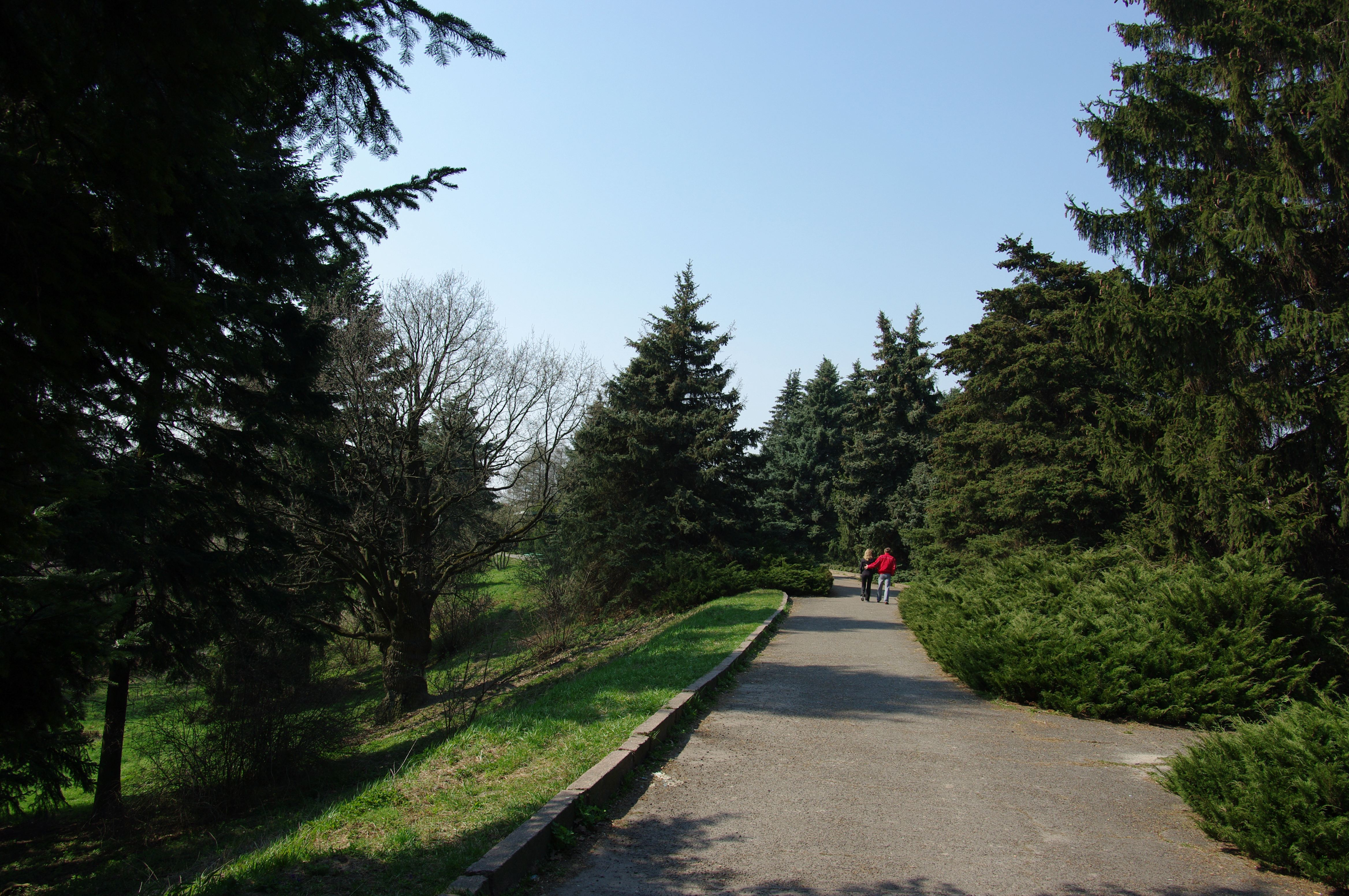

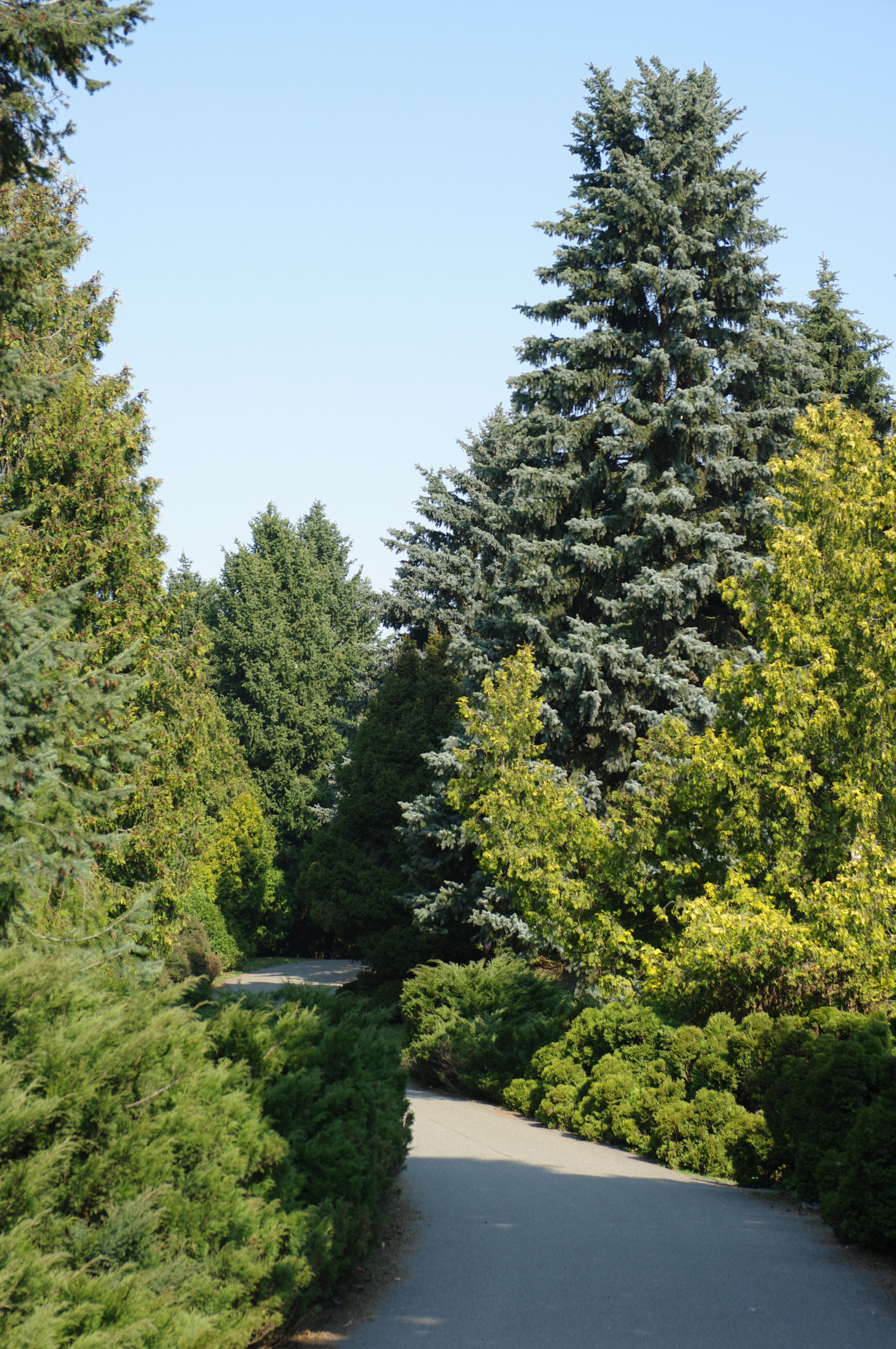

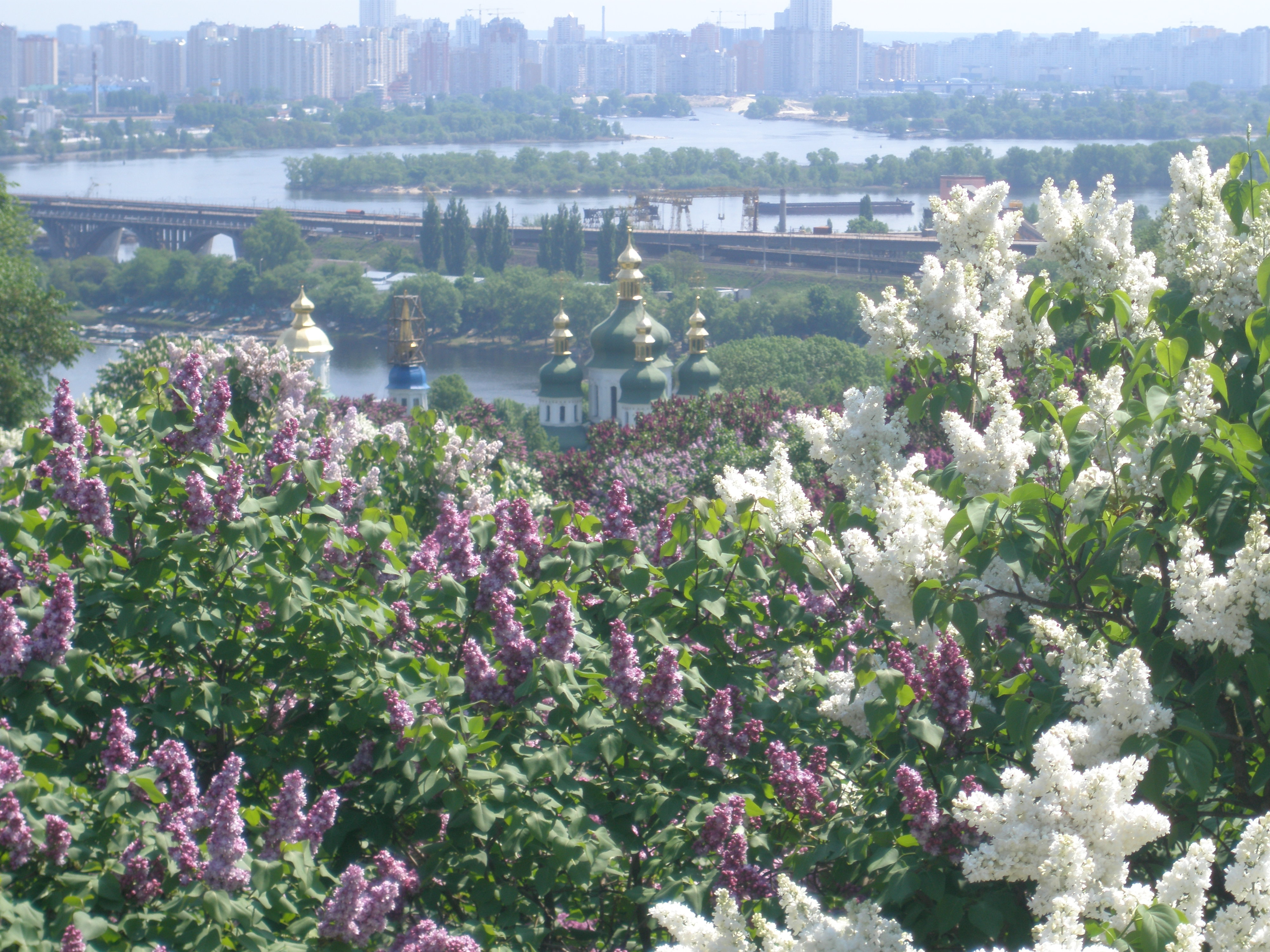

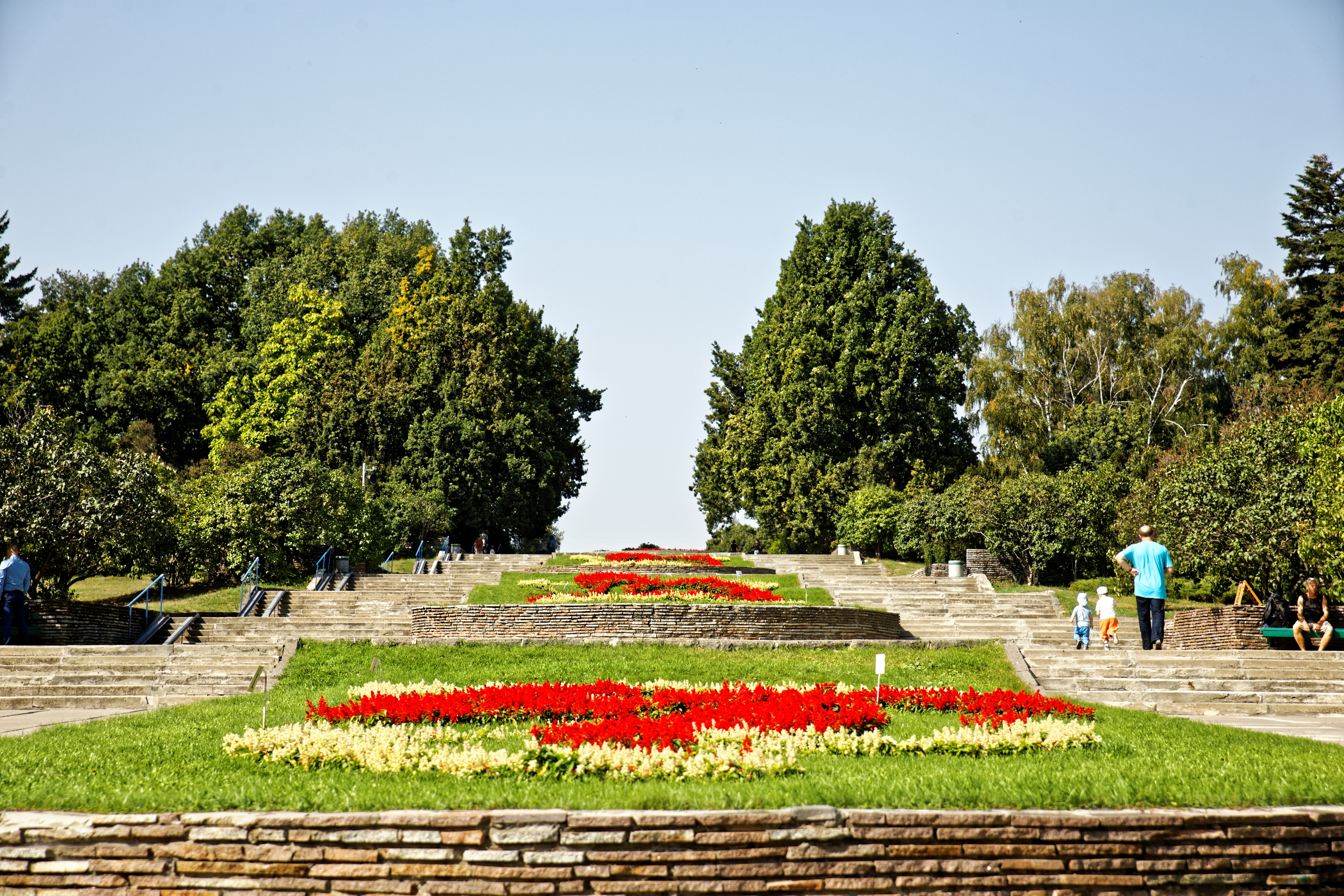

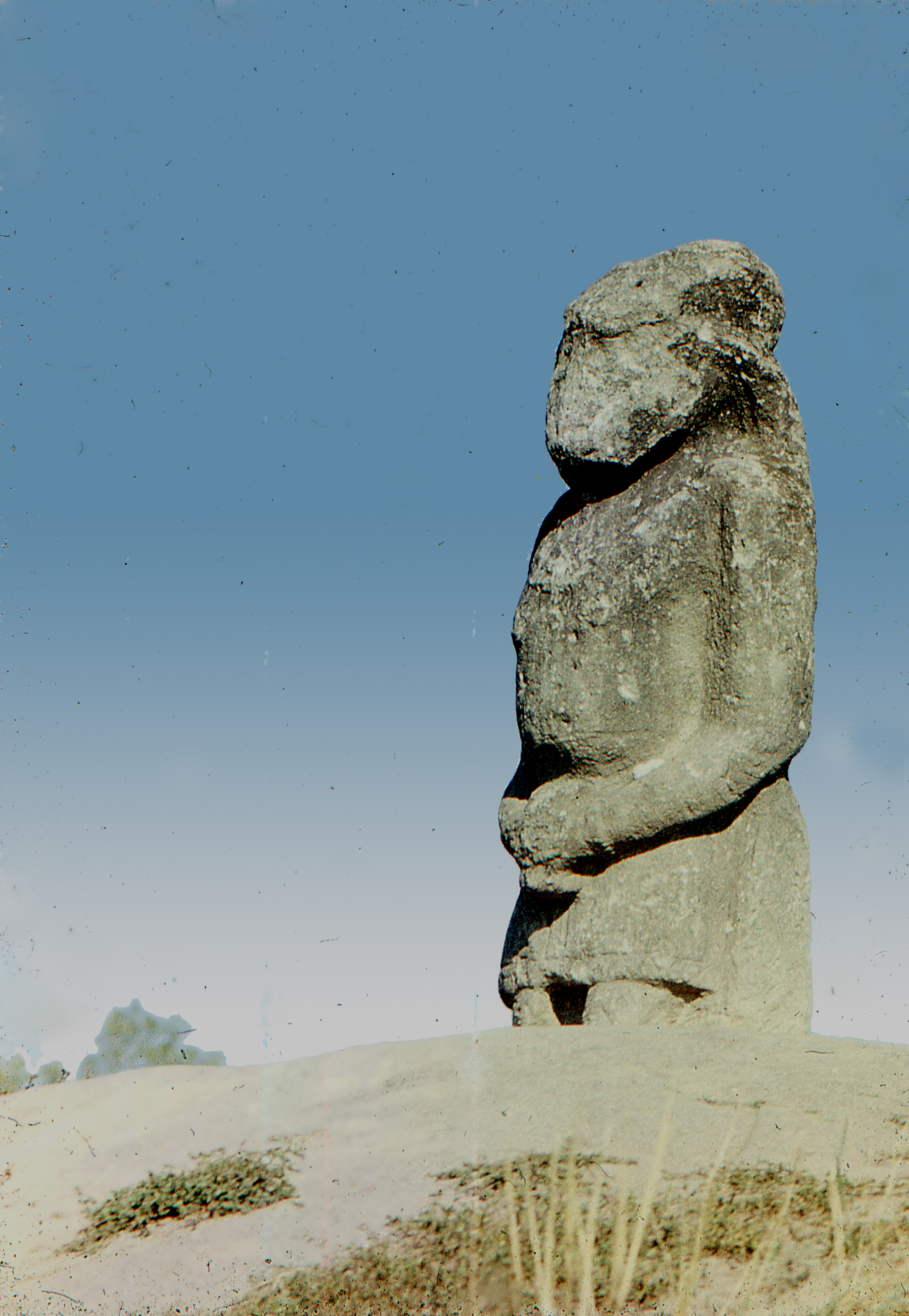
Kurgan stele
