= Trinity Monastery of St. Jonas =

Monastery in Kyiv, Ukraine

Coordinates: 50°24′56″N 30°33′49″E

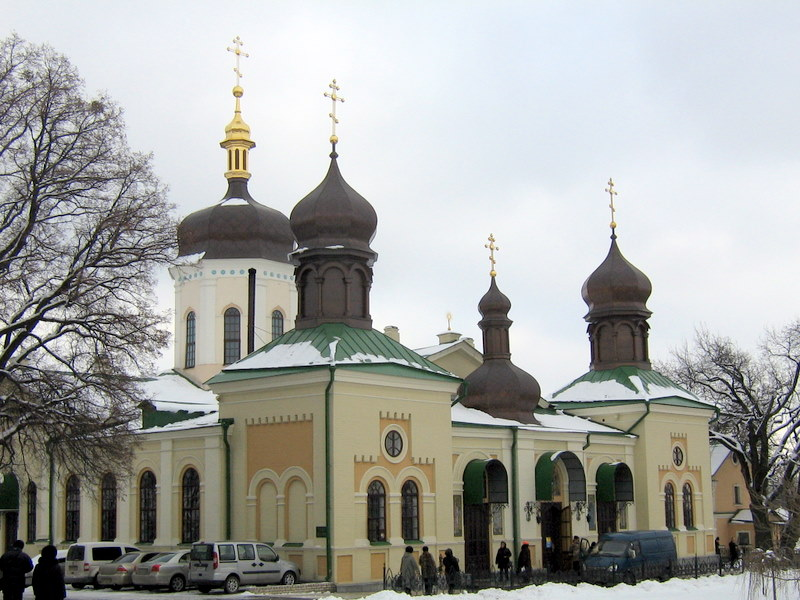
The Church of the Holy Trinity (1871)

The Trinity Monastery of St. Jonas (Ukrainian: Свято-Троїцький Іонинський чоловічий монастир, romanized: Sviato-Troitskyi Ionynskyi cholovichyi monastyr; Russian: Свято-Троицкий Ионинский монастырь) is a Ukrainian Orthodox monastery in the Kyivan neighbourhood of Zvirynets, a short distance from the medieval Vydubychi Monastery.

It was Jonas, a Vydubychi hegumen, who founded this monastery in 1864. Princess Vasilchikov, the widow of Kyiv's Governor General, decided to support the undertaking and presented her dacha to the brethren. It was on these grounds that the katholikon was constructed. The monastery's bell tower, at 110 meters, was to be the tallest in the Orthodox world. Its construction was halted due to the outbreak of World War I. As many as 800 monks resided there at the time.

The monastery was closed in 1934 and its grounds were taken over by the M.M. Gryshko National Botanical Garden. The monks of the recently revived monastery now help to restore the nearby Zvirynets caves.
