= Helladius and Theophilus =

Christian martyrs

Helladius and Theophilus (Greek: Έλλάδιος & Θεόφιλος) were two Christian martyrs in Libya, killed by being thrown into a furnace. Helladius was a layman (Ελλάδιος ο λαϊκός) and Theophilus a deacon (Θεόφιλος ο Διάκονος). The Roman Martyrology and Eastern Christianity's Synaxarium give their feast as 8 January.

== Sources ==
- http://www.catholic.org/saints/saint.php?saint_id=2268
- https://www.santiebeati.it/dettaglio/36620
