= Paschasia =

Second-century Christian nun and martyr

Paschasia (d. c. 178 CE?) was supposedly an ancient Christian nun and virgin martyr, who—according to the hagiographer Gregory of Tours—appeared to the builders of a church dedicated to St Benignus that was situated near her own church. Gregory of Tours states that she resembled an old woman clad in black with white hair, and that she said to the workers, "Greetings, my most beloved men; complete your fine work. Let the scaffolding that supports this building be raised, and the task that has such a director will justly proceed quickly. For if it were possible for the sight of your eyes to see, you would surely realize that St Benignus is directing your construction." Afterwards, Gregory writes, she returned to the church whence she came and then never appeared to any man again. In a much later tradition, documented in the Acta Sanctorum in the year 1052, purports that she was instructed and baptized by St Benignus, and—following his martyrdom—she was captured and tortured by "the pagans" under the reign of Emperor Aurelius (r. 270–275). However, according to legend, she refused to recant her faith, resulting in her execution. Afterwards, she was supposedly buried in a crypt nearby the tomb of St Benignus.
