= January 22 (Eastern Orthodox liturgics) =

Day in the Eastern Orthodox liturgical calendar

Eastern Orthodox liturgical calendar
January 21	January 22	January 23
January 22 O.S. ≍ February 4 N.S. January 22 N.S ≍ January 9 O.S.

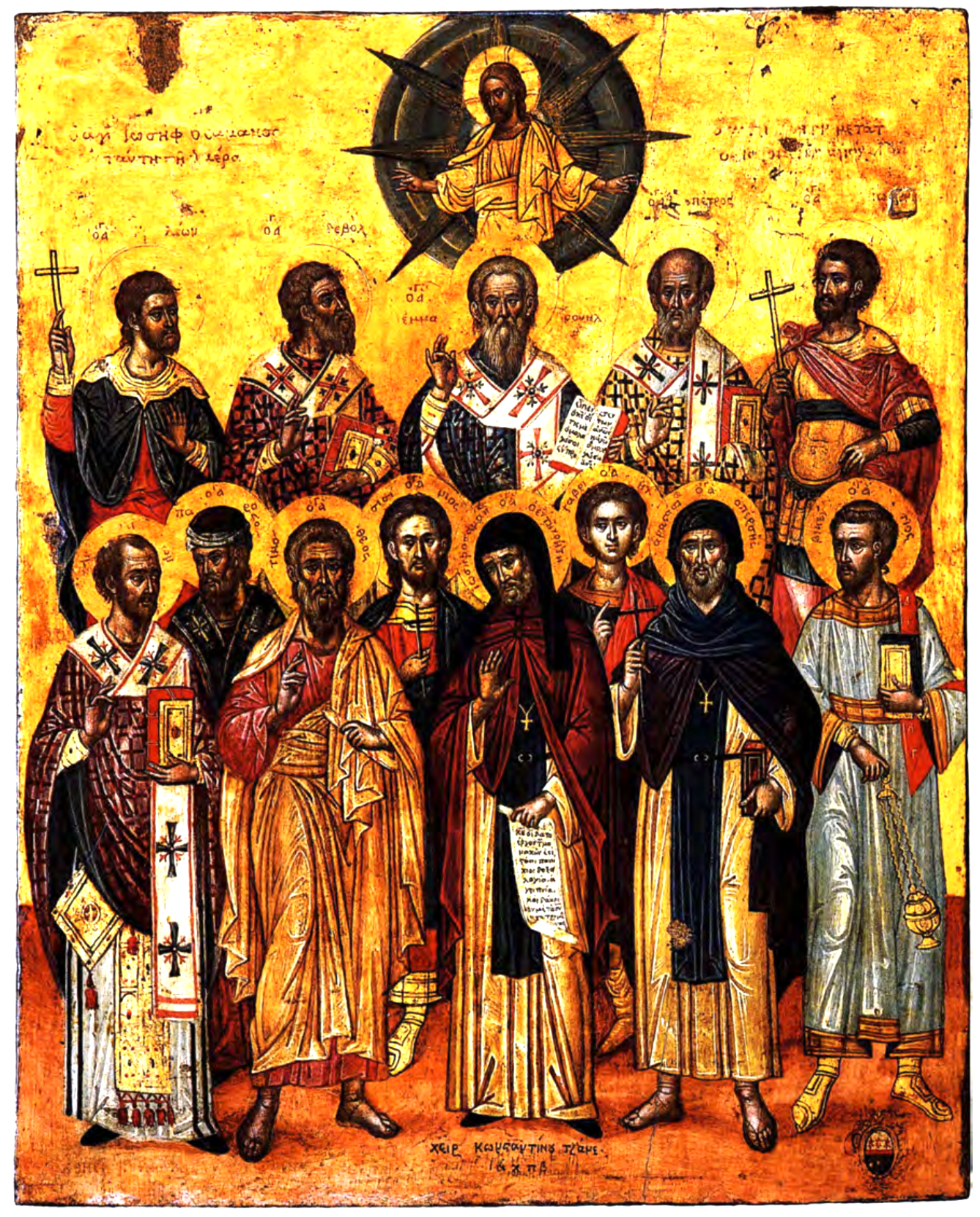
Icon "The Saints of the 22nd of January" by Konstantinos Tzanes.

January 22 in Eastern Orthodox liturgical calendars is a feast day and a day of commemoration of saints and martyrs. Although some Orthodox churches use the Revised Julian Calendar and others use the traditional Julian calendar, the fixed commemorations for their respective January 22 are broadly the same, no matter which calendar is used. (Note: Despite the dates being the same, the days to which they refer typically differ by 13 days. The notation Old Style or O.S. is sometimes used to indicate a date in the traditional Julian Calendar (the "Old Calendar"). The notation New Style or N.S, indicates a date in the Revised Julian calendar (the "New Calendar").)

== Saints ==
- Apostle Timothy, of the Seventy Apostles (c. 96)
- Venerable Martyr Anastasius the Persian (628) (Note: "At Rome, at Aquae Salviae, St. Anastasius, a Persian monk, who, after suffering much at Caesarea, in Palestine, from imprisonment, stripes and fetters, had to bear many afflictions from Chosroes, king of Persia, who caused him to be beheaded. He had sent before him to martyrdom seventy of his companions, who were precipitated into rivers. His head was brought to Rome, together with his venerable likeness, by the sight of which the demons are expelled, and diseases cured, as is attested by the Acts of the second council of Nicaea.") (see also: January 24 - Translation)
- Martyrs of Adrianople (815 or 817)

== Pre-Schism Western saints ==
- Hieromartyr Vincent the Deacon of Zaragoza, in Valencia under Diocletian (304) (Note: "AT Valencia, in Spain, while the wicked Dacian was governor, St. Vincent, deacon and martyr, who, after suffering imprisonment, hunger, the torture, the disjointing of his limbs; after being burned with plates of heated metal and on the gridiron, and tormented in other ways, took his flight to heaven, there to receive the reward of martyrdom. His noble triumph over his sufferings has been elegantly set forth in verse by Prudentius, and highly eulogized by St. Augustine and pope St. Leo.")
- Martyrs Vincent, Orontius, and Victor, near Girona, Catalonia, Spain (305)
- Saint Vincent, Bishop of Digne, France (380)
- Saint Blaesilla, a daughter of Saint Paula (383)
- Saint Gaudentius, Bishop of Novara and Confessor (417)
- Saint Wendreda, Virgin of March, Cambridgeshire (7th century)
- Saint Dominic of Sora, founder of several monasteries - at Scandrilia, Sora, Sangro, and elsewhere, renowned for miracles (1031)
- Saint Brithwald (Bertwald), Bishop of Ramsbury (1045)

== Post-Schism Orthodox saints ==
- Venerable Joseph Samakos (Samakus) the Sanctified, of Crete (1511) (Note: See: (in Greek) Άγιος Ιωσήφ Σαμάκος. Βικιπαίδεια. (Greek Wikipedia).)
- Venerable Macarius the Wonderworker, Founder and Abbot of Zhabyn Monastery, Belev (1623) (Note: See: (in Russian) Макарий Жабынский. Википедии. (Russian Wikipedia).)
- Saint Joasaph Bolotov, Enlightener of Alaska and the American land (1799)
- Venerable Bessarion (Vissarion) Korkoliakos of Agathonos Monastery (1991) (see also: January 9 - O.S.)

=== New martyrs and confessors ===
- New Venerable Martyr Anastasius the Deacon of the Kiev Caves Monastery (12th century)
- New Venerable Martyr Gregory of Peć (17th-18th centuries) (Note: "St. Gregory of Peć (17th-18th C.) was a young monk of the monastery of the Patriarchate of Peć. He was martyred after refusing to convert to Islam. Miracles began to take place at the place where he was secretly buried by faithful Christians and a small church was later built on the site. Atheist authorities demolished the church and built an institute in the mid-20th century, although the martyr’s incorrupt relics were discovered during the demolishing of the church. His memory will be celebrated on January 22/February 7.")
- New Hieromartyrs John (Dobrokhotov), Nicholas (Bukharin), Jacob (Zyablitsky), Peter (Zyablitsky), John (Korzhavin), John (Rozanov), Priests (1938)
- New Hieromartyrs John Uspensky and Euthymius Tikhonravov, Priests (1938)
- New Hieromartyr Mihailo Barbić, parish priest of Krtoli (c. 1946) (Note: In his homily, Met. Joanikije emphasized that the newly glorified hieromartyr lived his brief earthly life "in great labor for the glory of God" and walked a thorny path following Christ. From childhood St. Mihailo had desired to become a priest, following the example of his uncle, Archpriest Sava Barbić of Dubrovnik, who was also a martyr from World War I. The young priest served parishes in Morinje and Krtole, worked as a religious education teacher and military chaplain, and was instrumental in beginning the restoration of Prevlaka Monastery...Church tradition holds that St. Mihailo was strangled and thrown into a septic pit. "Everything was done after his martyr’s death to erase his memory, so that his name would not be mentioned," the Metropolitan stated.) (see also: January 9 - O.S.)

== Other commemorations ==
- Finding of the Holy Icon of "Panagia Eleistria" in Koroni, Messenia (1897)

== Icon gallery ==
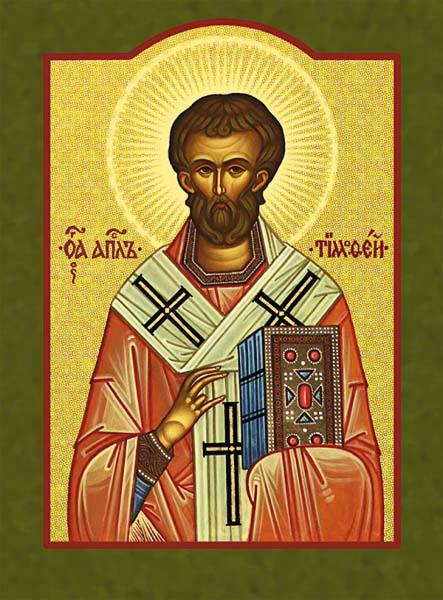
Apostle Timothy, of the Seventy Apostles.

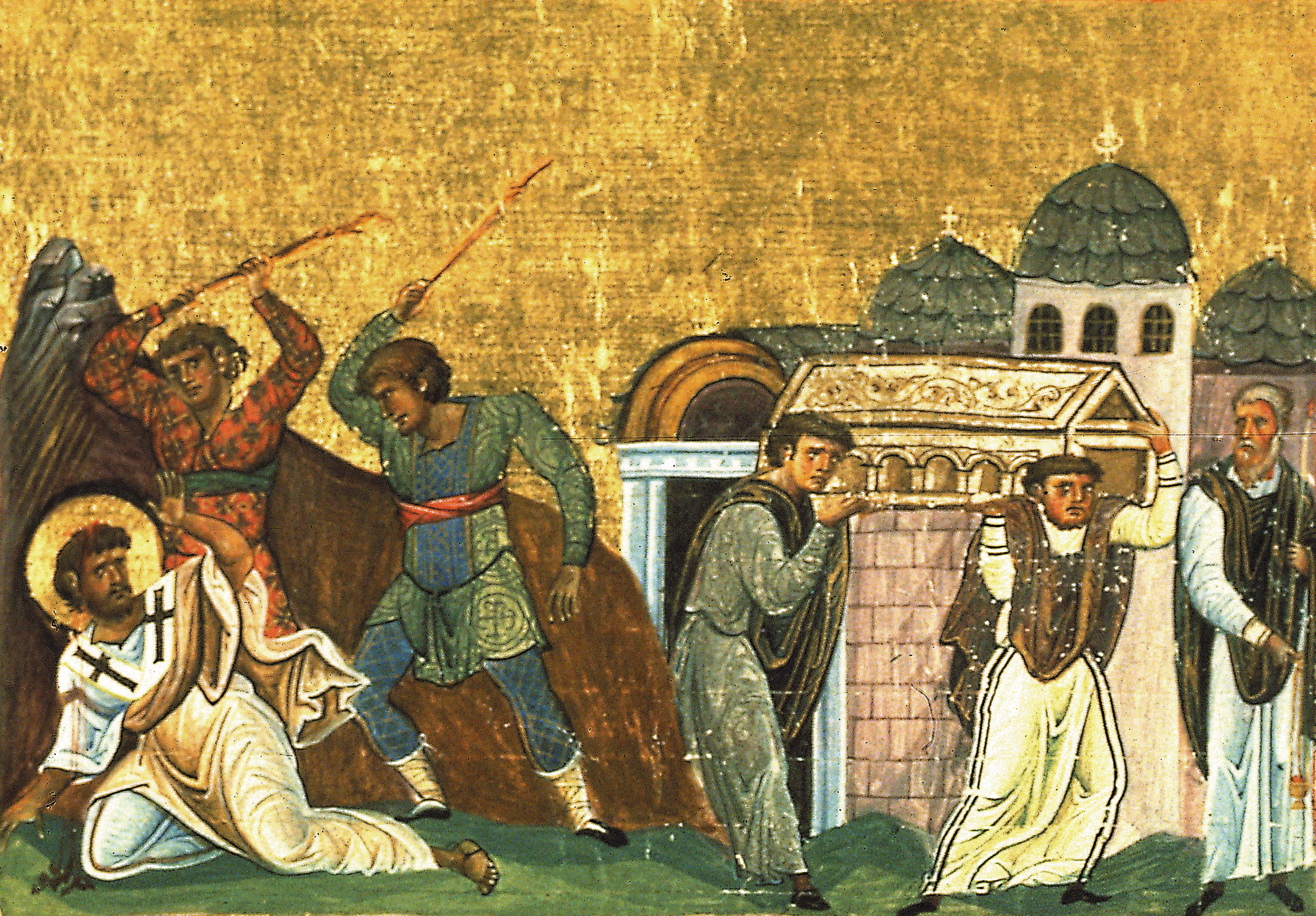
Apostle Timothy, of the Seventy Apostles.
(Menologion of Basil II, 10th century).

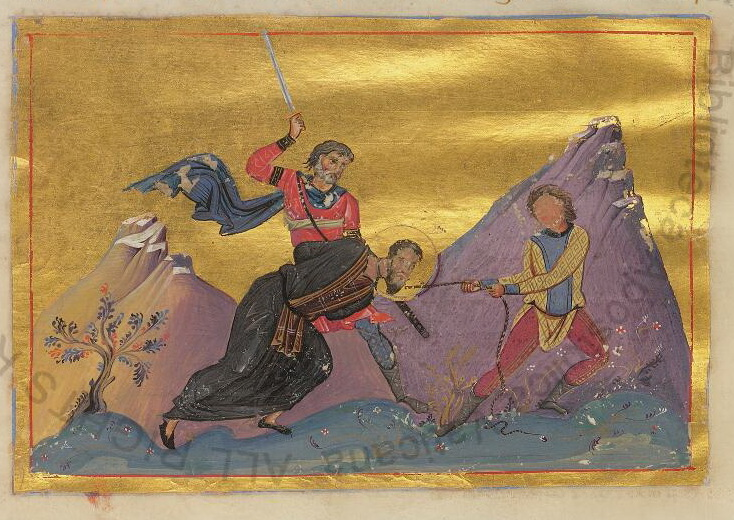
Monk-martyr Anastasius the Persian.
(Menologion of Basil II, 10th century).

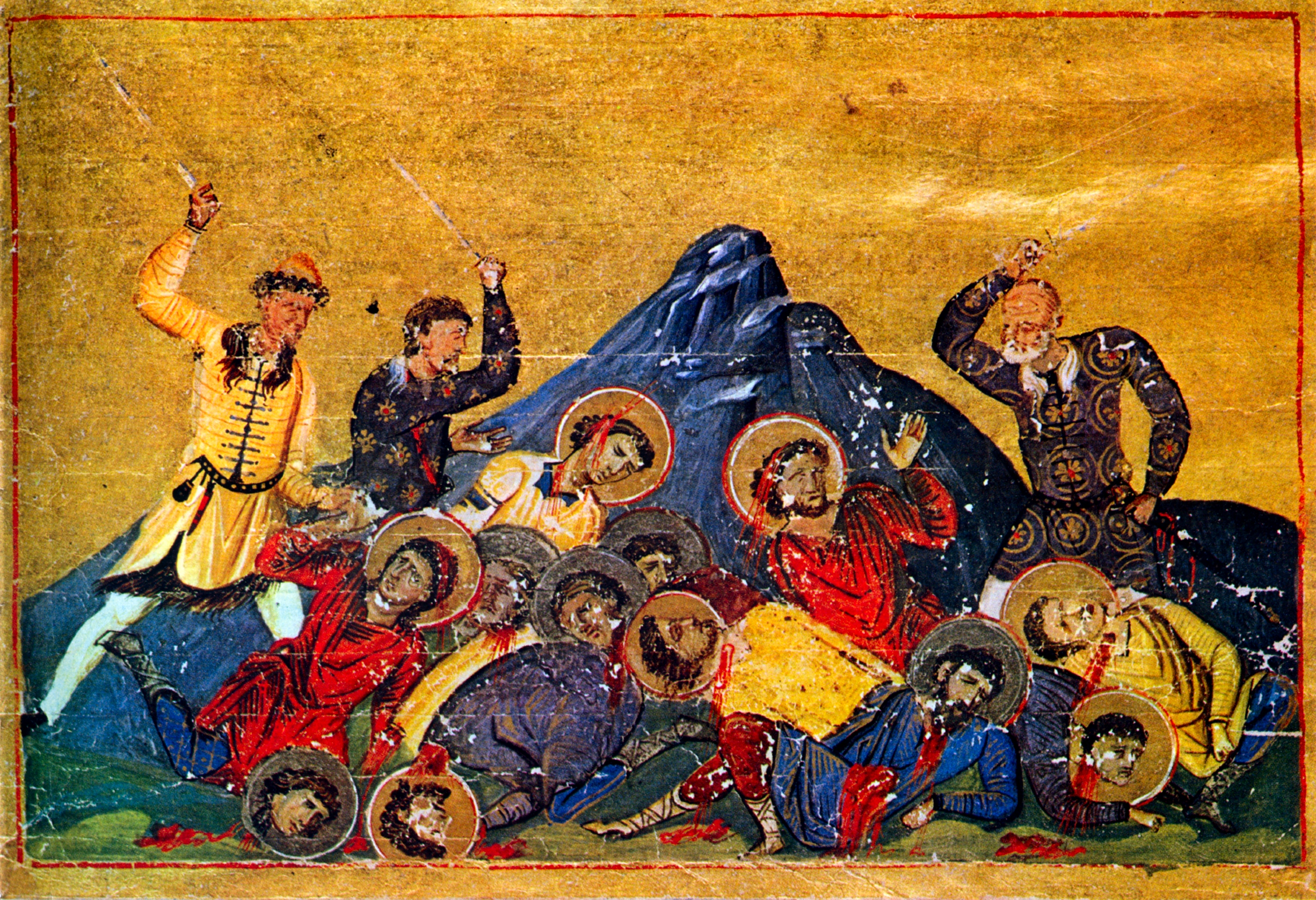
Martyrs of Adrianople.
(Menologion of Basil II, 10th century).

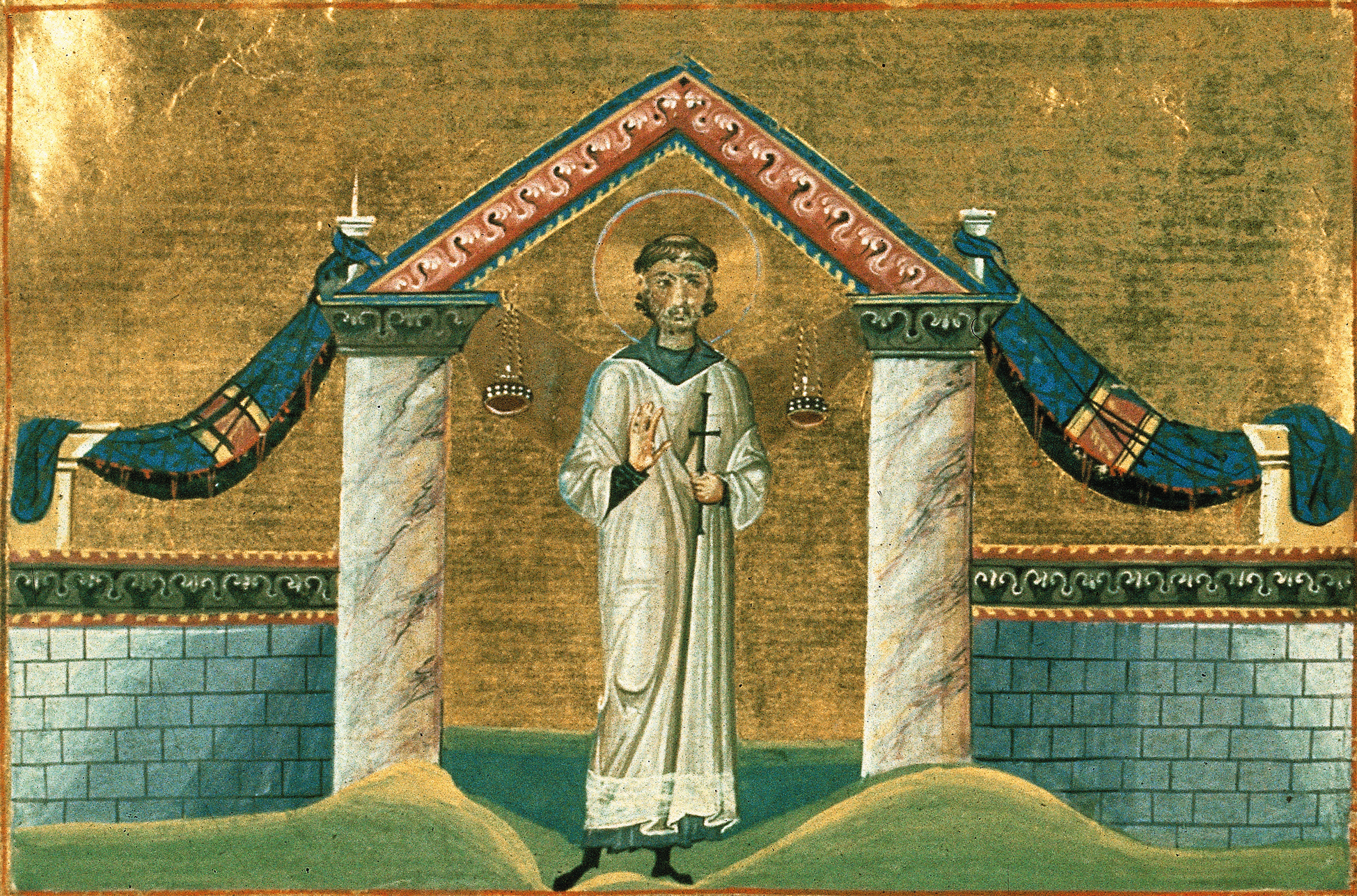
Hieromartyr Vincent the Deacon (Vincent of Saragossa).
(Menologion of Basil II, 10th century).

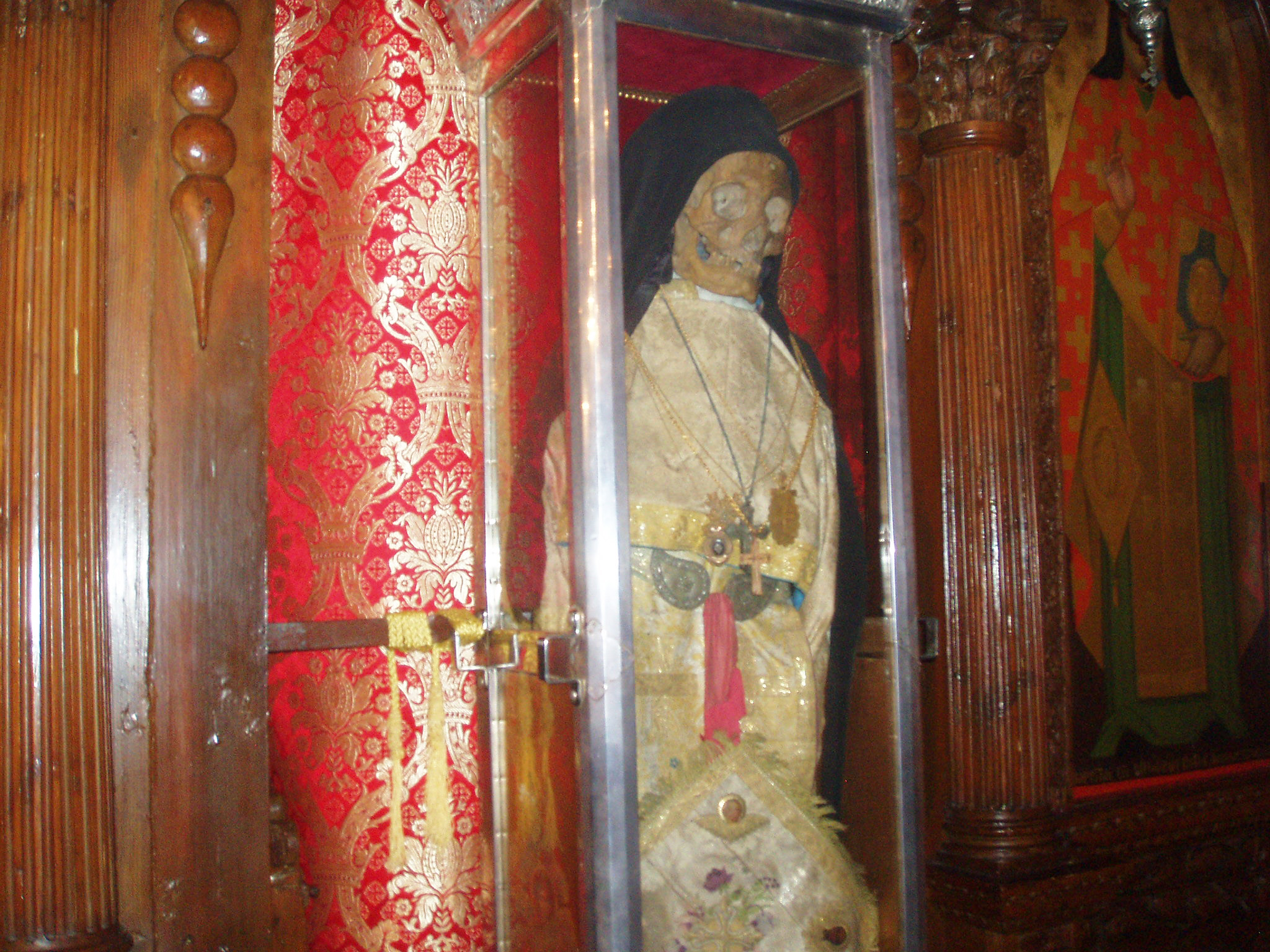
The holy relics of St. Joseph Samakos the Sanctified, of Crete.
(Church of Pantokrator, in Gaitani, Zakynthos).

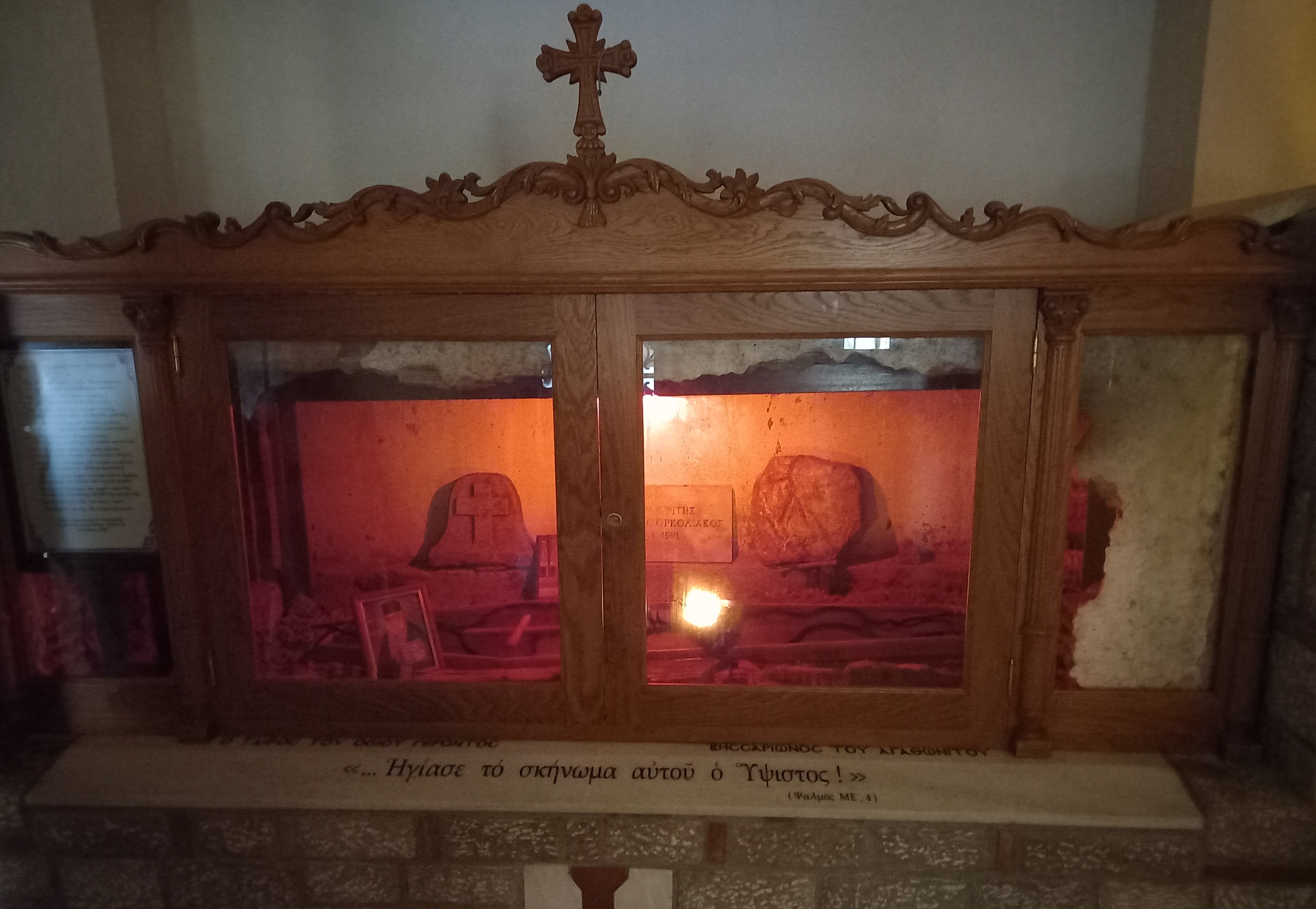
The holy relics of St. Bessarion the Agathonite, at the Holy Monastery of Agathonos.

St. Macarius the Wonderworker, Founder and Abbot of Zhabyn Monastery, Belev.

== Sources ==
- January 22 / February 4. Orthodox Calendar (PRAVOSLAVIE.RU).
- February 4 / January 22. HOLY TRINITY RUSSIAN ORTHODOX CHURCH (A parish of the Patriarchate of Moscow).
- January 22. OCA - The Lives of the Saints.
- The Autonomous Orthodox Metropolia of Western Europe and the Americas (ROCOR). St. Hilarion Calendar of Saints for the year of our Lord 2004. St. Hilarion Press (Austin, TX). p. 9.
- January 22. Latin Saints of the Orthodox Patriarchate of Rome.
- The Roman Martyrology. Transl. by the Archbishop of Baltimore. Last Edition, According to the Copy Printed at Rome in 1914. Revised Edition, with the Imprimatur of His Eminence Cardinal Gibbons. Baltimore: John Murphy Company, 1916. pp. 22–23.
- Rev. Richard Stanton. A Menology of England and Wales, or, Brief Memorials of the Ancient British and English Saints Arranged According to the Calendar, Together with the Martyrs of the 16th and 17th Centuries. London: Burns & Oates, 1892. pp. 31–32.

Greek Sources

- Great Synaxaristes: (in Greek) 22 ΙΑΝΟΥΑΡΙΟΥ. ΜΕΓΑΣ ΣΥΝΑΞΑΡΙΣΤΗΣ.
- (in Greek) Συναξαριστής. 22 Ιανουαρίου. ECCLESIA.GR. (H ΕΚΚΛΗΣΙΑ ΤΗΣ ΕΛΛΑΔΟΣ).

Russian Sources

- (in Russian) 4 февраля (22 января). Православная Энциклопедия под редакцией Патриарха Московского и всея Руси Кирилла (электронная версия). (Orthodox Encyclopedia - Pravenc.ru).
- (in Russian) 22 января (ст.ст.) 4 февраля 2014 (нов. ст.). Русская Православная Церковь Отдел внешних церковных связей. (DECR).
