= January 22 =

January 22 this year in various calendars
- Thursday, 22 January 2026
Akan	Monoyaw
Armenian	6 Mehekani 1475
Aztec	Toxcatl 12, 13 Xōchitl
Babylonian	2 Tebetu, 2336 SE
Balinese pawukon	Menga, Kajeng, Menala, Wage, Maulu, Wraspati of Medangkungan, Uma, Dadi, Suka
Bengali	8 Magh, BS 1432
Chinese	Yang Fire Monkey・Legs Mansion; Wood Snake Year, Month 12, Day 4 (Dahan, 13 days until Lichun)
Common Era	22 January 2026 CE
Coptic	14 Tobi, AM 1742
Egyptian	11 Payni, 2774 NE
Ethiopian	14 Ṭer, 2018 Amätä Məhrät
French Republican	Décade I, Tridi de Pluviôse de l'Année 234 de la République
Gregorian	22 January, AD 2026
Hebrew	4 Shevat, AM 5786
Hindu	Śatabhiṣaj・Varīyas; Solar: 9 Māgha, 1947 SE; Lunisolar: Caturthī, Śukla pakṣa of Māgha, 2082 VE; Siddhārthin・5126 KY・1,872,597
Icelandic	Fimmtudagur, 30 Mörsugur 2025
Islamic	3 Sha'aban, AH 1447 (using tabular method)
ISO week date	2026-W04-4
Japanese	4 Shiwasu, Reiwa 8 (Daikan, 13 days until Risshun)
Julian	9 January, AD 2026 (AM 7534)
Julian day	2461063
Korean	4 Sodal, 4358 DE
Maya	13.0.13.5.0; 18 Muan, 13 Ahau
Roman	ante diem V Idus Ianuarias, MMDCCLXXIX AUC
Solar Hijri	2 Bahman, SH 1404
Tibetan	4 rgyal, shing mo sbrul 2152 or 1771 or 999

<<	January					>>
Su	Mo	Tu	We	Th	Fr	Sa
				1	2	3
4	5	6	7	8	9	10
11	12	13	14	15	16	17
18	19	20	21	22	23	24
25	26	27	28	29	30	31
2026

January 22 in recent years
2026 (Thursday)
2025 (Wednesday)
2024 (Monday)
2023 (Sunday)
2022 (Saturday)
2021 (Friday)
2020 (Wednesday)
2019 (Tuesday)
2018 (Monday)
2017 (Sunday)

January 22 is the 22nd day of the year in the Gregorian calendar; 343 days remain until the end of the year (344 in leap years).

== Events ==
=== Pre-1600 ===
- 613 – Eight-month-old Heraclius Constantine is crowned as co-emperor (Caesar) by his father Heraclius at Constantinople.
- 871 – Battle of Basing: The West Saxons led by King Æthelred I are defeated by the Danelaw Vikings at Basing.
- 1506 – The first contingent of 150 Swiss Guards arrives at the Vatican.
- 1517 – The Ottoman Empire under Selim I defeats the Mamluk Sultanate and captures present-day Egypt at the Battle of Ridaniya.
- 1555 – The Ava Kingdom falls to the Taungoo Dynasty in what is now Myanmar.

=== 1601–1900 ===
- 1689 – The Convention Parliament convenes to determine whether James II and VII, the last Roman Catholic monarch of England, Ireland and Scotland, had vacated the thrones of England and Ireland when he fled to France in 1688.
- 1808 – The Portuguese royal family arrives in Brazil after fleeing the French army's invasion of Portugal two months earlier.
- 1849 – Second Anglo-Sikh War: The Siege of Multan ends after nine months when the last Sikh defenders of Multan, Punjab, surrender.
- 1863 – The January Uprising breaks out in Poland, Lithuania and Belarus. The aim of the national movement is to regain Polish–Lithuanian–Ruthenian Commonwealth from occupation by Russia.
- 1879 – Anglo-Zulu War: the Battle of Isandlwana results in a Zulu victory.
- 1879 – Anglo-Zulu War: the Battle of Rorke's Drift, just some 15 km (9.3 mi) away from Isandlwana, results in a British victory.
- 1890 – The United Mine Workers of America is founded in Columbus, Ohio.

=== 1901–present ===
- 1901 – Edward VII is proclaimed King of the United Kingdom after the death of his mother, Queen Victoria.
- 1905 – Bloody Sunday occurs in Saint Petersburg, beginning the 1905 revolution.
- 1906 – SS Valencia runs aground on rocks on Vancouver Island, British Columbia, killing more than 130.
- 1915 – Over 600 people are killed in Guadalajara, Mexico, when a train plunges off the tracks into a deep canyon.
- 1917 – American entry into World War I: President Woodrow Wilson of the still-neutral United States calls for "peace without victory" in Europe.
- 1919 – Act Zluky is signed, unifying the Ukrainian People's Republic and the West Ukrainian National Republic.
- 1924 – Ramsay MacDonald becomes the first Labour Prime Minister of the United Kingdom.
- 1927 – Teddy Wakelam gives the first live radio commentary of a football match, between Arsenal F.C. and Sheffield United at Highbury.
- 1941 – World War II: British and Commonwealth troops capture Tobruk from Italian forces during Operation Compass.
- 1943 – World War II: Australian and American forces defeat Japanese army and navy units in the bitterly fought Battle of Buna–Gona.
- 1944 – World War II: The Allies commence Operation Shingle, an assault on Anzio and Nettuno, Italy.
- 1946 – In Iran, Qazi Muhammad declares the independent people's Republic of Mahabad at Chahar Cheragh Square in the Kurdish city of Mahabad; he becomes the new president and Haji Baba Sheikh becomes the prime minister.
- 1946 – Creation of the Central Intelligence Group, forerunner of the Central Intelligence Agency.
- 1947 – KTLA, the first commercial television station west of the Mississippi River, begins operation in Hollywood.
- 1957 – Israel withdraws from the Sinai Peninsula.
- 1963 – The Élysée Treaty of cooperation between France and West Germany is signed by Charles de Gaulle and Konrad Adenauer.
- 1967 – Between dozens and hundreds of anti-Somocista demonstrators are killed by the Nicaraguan National Guard in Managua.
- 1968 – Apollo Program: Apollo 5 lifts off carrying the first Lunar module into space.
- 1968 – Operation Igloo White, a US electronic surveillance system to stop communist infiltration into South Vietnam begins installation.
- 1970 – The Boeing 747, the world's first "jumbo jet", enters commercial service for launch customer Pan American Airways with its maiden voyage from New York's John F. Kennedy International Airport to London Heathrow Airport.
- 1971 – The Singapore Declaration, one of the two most important documents to the uncodified constitution of the Commonwealth of Nations, is issued.
- 1973 – The Supreme Court of the United States delivers its decisions in Roe v. Wade and Doe v. Bolton, legalizing elective abortion in all fifty states. This decision is subsequently overturned in Dobbs v. Jackson Women's Health Organization in 2022.
- 1973 – The crew of Apollo 17 addresses a joint session of Congress after the completion of the final Apollo Moon landing mission.
- 1973 – A chartered Boeing 707 explodes in flames upon landing at Kano Airport, Nigeria, killing 176.
- 1973 – In a bout for the world heavyweight boxing championship in Kingston, Jamaica, challenger George Foreman knocks down champion Joe Frazier six times in the first two rounds before the fight is stopped by referee Arthur Mercante Sr..
- 1987 – Philippine security forces open fire on a crowd of 10,000–15,000 demonstrators at Malacañang Palace, Manila, killing 13.
- 1992 – Space Shuttle program: The space shuttle Discovery launches on STS-42 carrying Dr. Roberta Bondar, who becomes the first Canadian woman and the first neurologist in space.
- 1995 – Israeli–Palestinian conflict: Beit Lid suicide bombing: In central Israel, near Netanya, two Gazans blow themselves up at a military transit point, killing 19 Israeli soldiers.
- 1998 – Space Shuttle program: space shuttle Endeavour launches on STS-89 to dock with the Russian space station Mir.
- 1999 – Australian missionary Graham Staines and his two sons are burned alive by radical Hindus while sleeping in their car in Eastern India.
- 2006 – Evo Morales is inaugurated as President of Bolivia, becoming the country's first indigenous president.
- 2007 – At least 88 people are killed when two car bombs explode in the Bab Al-Sharqi market in central Baghdad, Iraq.
- 2009 – U.S. President Barack Obama signs an executive order to close the Guantanamo Bay detention camp; congressional opposition will prevent it being implemented.
- 2024 – Ram Mandir is inaugurated by Indian Prime Minister Narendra Modi at Ayodhya, Uttar Pradesh after 500 years of dispute.

== Births ==
=== Pre-1600 ===
- 1263 – Ibn Taymiyyah, Syrian scholar and theologian (died 1328)
- 1440 – Ivan III of Russia (died 1505)
- 1522 – Charles II de Valois, Duke of Orléans, (died 1545)
- 1561 – Francis Bacon, English philosopher and politician, Attorney General for England and Wales (died 1626)
- 1570 – Sir Robert Cotton, 1st Baronet, of Connington, English historian and politician, founded the Cotton library (died 1631)
- 1592 – Pierre Gassendi, French mathematician, astronomer, and philosopher (died 1655)

=== 1601–1900 ===
- 1645 – William Kidd, Scottish sailor and pirate hunter (probable); (died 1701)
- 1654 – Richard Blackmore, English physician and poet (died 1729)
- 1690 – Nicolas Lancret, French painter (died 1743)
- 1729 – Gotthold Ephraim Lessing, German philosopher and author (died 1781)
- 1733 – Philip Carteret, English admiral and explorer (died 1796)
- 1740 – Noah Phelps, American soldier, lawyer, and judge (died 1809)
- 1781 – François Habeneck, French violinist and conductor (died 1849)
- 1788 – Lord Byron, English poet and playwright (died 1824)
- 1792 – Lady Lucy Whitmore, English noblewoman, hymn writer (died 1840)
- 1796 – Karl Ernst Claus, Estonian-Russian chemist, botanist, and academic (died 1864)
- 1797 – Maria Leopoldina of Austria (died 1826)
- 1799 – Ludger Duvernay, Canadian journalist, publisher, and politician (died 1852)
- 1802 – Richard Upjohn, English-American architect (died 1878)
- 1828 – Dayrolles Eveleigh-de-Moleyns, 4th Baron Ventry, Irish hereditary peer (died 1914)
- 1831 – Prince Christian of Schleswig-Holstein (died 1917)
- 1840 – Ernest Wilberforce, English bishop (died 1907)
- 1849 – August Strindberg, Swedish novelist, poet, and playwright (died 1912)
- 1858 – Beatrice Webb, English sociologist and economist (died 1943)
- 1861 – George Fuller, Australian politician, 22nd Premier of New South Wales (died 1940)
- 1865 – Wilbur Scoville, American chemist and pharmacist (died 1942)
- 1867 – Gisela Januszewska, Jewish-Austrian physician (died 1943)
- 1869 – José Vicente de Freitas, Portuguese colonel and politician, 97th Prime Minister of Portugal (died 1952)
- 1874 – Edward Harkness, American philanthropist (died 1940)
- 1874 – Jay Hughes, American baseball player and coach (died 1924)
- 1875 – D. W. Griffith, American director, producer, and screenwriter (died 1948)
- 1877 – Tom Jones, American baseball player and manager (died 1923)
- 1879 – Francis Picabia, French painter and poet (died 1953)
- 1880 – Bill O'Neill, Canadian-American baseball player (died 1920)
- 1880 – Frigyes Riesz, Hungarian mathematician and academic (died 1956)
- 1881 – Ira Thomas, American baseball player and manager (died 1958)
- 1886 – John J. Becker, American pianist, composer, and conductor (died 1961)
- 1887 – Helen Hoyt, American poet and author (died 1972)
- 1889 – Henri Pélissier, French cyclist (died 1935)
- 1889 – Amos Strunk, American baseball player and manager (died 1979)
- 1890 – Fred M. Vinson, American judge and politician, 13th Chief Justice of the United States (died 1953)
- 1891 – Antonio Gramsci, Italian philosopher and politician (died 1937)
- 1892 – Marcel Dassault, French businessman, founded Dassault Aviation (died 1986)
- 1893 – Conrad Veidt, German-American actor, director, and producer (died 1943)
- 1897 – Rosa Ponselle, American operatic soprano (died 1981)
- 1897 – Dilipkumar Roy, a Bengali Indian musician, musicologist, novelist, poet and essayist. (died 1980)
- 1898 – Ross Barnett, American lawyer and politician, 52nd Governor of Mississippi (died 1987)
- 1898 – Sergei Eisenstein, Russian director and screenwriter (died 1948)
- 1898 – Denise Legeay, French actress (died 1968)
- 1899 – Martti Haavio, Finnish poet and mythologist (died 1973)
- 1900 – Ernst Busch, German actor and singer (died 1980)
- 1900 – James Hamilton Doggart, English ophthalmic surgeon (died 1989)

=== 1901–present ===
- 1902 – Daniel Kinsey, American hurdler, coach, and academic (died 1970)
- 1903 – Fritz Houtermans, Polish-German physicist and academic (died 1966)
- 1904 – George Balanchine, Georgian-American dancer, choreographer, and director, co-founded the New York City Ballet (died 1983)
- 1904 – Arkady Gaidar, Russian journalist and author (died 1941)
- 1905 – Willy Hartner, German physicist, historian, and academic (died 1981)
- 1906 – Robert E. Howard, American author and poet (died 1936)
- 1907 – Douglas Corrigan, American pilot and engineer, famous "wrong way" early solo flyer of the Atlantic (died 1995)
- 1907 – Dixie Dean, English footballer (died 1980)
- 1908 – Lev Landau, Azerbaijani-Russian physicist and academic, Nobel Prize laureate (died 1968)
- 1909 – Martha Norelius, Swedish-born American swimmer (died 1955)
- 1909 – Porfirio Rubirosa, Dominican racing driver, polo player, and diplomat (died 1965)
- 1909 – Ann Sothern, American actress and singer (died 2001)
- 1909 – U Thant, Burmese educator and diplomat, 3rd United Nations Secretary-General (died 1974)
- 1911 – Bruno Kreisky, Austrian lawyer and politician, 22nd Chancellor of Austria (died 1990)
- 1913 – Henry Bauchau, Belgian psychoanalyst and author (died 2012)
- 1913 – William Conway, Irish cardinal (died 1977)
- 1913 – Carl F. H. Henry, American theologian and publisher (died 2003)
- 1914 – Dimitris Dragatakis, Greek violinist and composer (died 2001)
- 1915 – Heinrich Albertz, German theologian and politician, Mayor of Berlin (died 1993)
- 1916 – Bill Durnan, Canadian ice hockey player and coach (died 1972)
- 1916 – Henri Dutilleux, French pianist, composer, and educator (died 2013)
- 1916 – Harilal Upadhyay, Indian author, poet, and astrologist (died 1994)
- 1917 – Bruce Shand, British Army officer, and father of Queen Camilla (died 2006)
- 1918 – Elmer Lach, Canadian ice hockey player and coach (died 2015)
- 1919 – Diomedes Olivo, Dominican baseball player and scout (died 1977)
- 1920 – Irving Kristol, American journalist, author, and academic, founded The National Interest (died 2009)
- 1920 – Alf Ramsey, English footballer and coach (died 1999)
- 1922 – Howard Moss, American poet, playwright and critic (died 1987)
- 1923 – Diana Douglas, British-American actress (died 2015)
- 1924 – J. J. Johnson, American trombonist and composer (died 2001)
- 1924 – Ján Chryzostom Korec, Slovak cardinal (died 2015)
- 1924 – Charles Lisanby, American production designer and art director (died 2013)
- 1927 – Lou Creekmur, American football player and sportscaster (died 2009)
- 1927 – Joe Perry, American football player (died 2011)
- 1928 – Yoshihiko Amino, Japanese historian, author, and academic (died 2004)
- 1929 – Petr Eben, Czech composer, organist and choirmaster (died 2007)
- 1930 – Mariví Bilbao, Spanish actress (died 2013)
- 1930 – Daniel Camargo Barbosa, Colombian serial killer (died 1994)
- 1930 – Éamon de Buitléar, Irish wildlife filmmaker, naturalist, writer and musician (died 2013)
- 1931 – Sam Cooke, American singer-songwriter (died 1964)
- 1931 – Galina Zybina, Russian shot putter and javelin thrower (died 2024)
- 1932 – Berthold Grünfeld, Norwegian psychiatrist and academic (died 2007)
- 1932 – Piper Laurie, American actress (died 2023)
- 1932 – Tom Railsback, American politician (died 2020)
- 1933 – Yuri Chesnokov, Russian volleyball player and coach (died 2010)
- 1934 – Vijay Anand, Indian actor, director, producer, and screenwriter (died 2004)
- 1934 – Bill Bixby, American actor and director (died 1993)
- 1936 – Ong Teng Cheong, Singaporean architect and politician, 5th President of Singapore (died 2002)
- 1936 – Alan J. Heeger, American physicist and chemist, Nobel Prize laureate
- 1937 – Alma Delia Fuentes, Mexican actress (died 2017)
- 1937 – Edén Pastora, Nicaraguan politician (died 2020)
- 1937 – Joseph Wambaugh, American author (died 2025)
- 1938 – Peter Beard, Australian photographer and author (died 2020)
- 1938 – Altair Gomes de Figueiredo, Brazilian footballer (died 2019)
- 1939 – Jørgen Garde, Danish admiral (died 1996)
- 1939 – Alfredo Palacio, Ecuadoran physician and politician, President of Ecuador (died 2025)
- 1939 – Luigi Simoni, Italian footballer and manager (died 2020)
- 1939 – J. C. Tremblay, Canadian ice hockey player and scout (died 1994)
- 1940 – John Hurt, English actor (died 2017)
- 1940 – Gillian Shephard, English educator and politician, Secretary of State for Education
- 1941 – Jaan Kaplinski, Estonian poet, philosopher, and critic (died 2021)
- 1942 – Mimis Domazos, Greek footballer (died 2025)
- 1944 – Khosrow Golsorkhi, Iranian journalist, poet, and activist (died 1974)
- 1945 – Christoph Schönborn, Austrian cardinal
- 1946 – Malcolm McLaren, English singer-songwriter and manager (died 2010)
- 1946 – Serge Savard, Canadian ice hockey player and manager
- 1947 – Vladimir Oravsky, Czech-Swedish author and director
- 1949 – Steve Perry, American singer-songwriter and producer
- 1950 – Paul Bew, Northern Irish historian and academic
- 1950 – Frank Schade, American basketball player and coach
- 1951 – Ondrej Nepela, Slovak figure skater and coach (died 1989)
- 1953 – Winfried Berkemeier, German footballer and manager
- 1953 – Myung-whun Chung, South Korean pianist and conductor
- 1953 – Jim Jarmusch, American director and screenwriter
- 1954 – Tully Blanchard, Canadian-American wrestler
- 1955 – Lester Hayes, American football player
- 1955 – Thomas David Jones, American captain, pilot, and astronaut
- 1955 – John Wesley Shipp, American actor
- 1956 – Steve Riley, American drummer (died 2023)
- 1957 – Mike Bossy, Canadian ice hockey player and sportscaster (died 2022)
- 1957 – Rita Chatterton, American professional wrestling referee
- 1957 – Godfrey Thoma, Nauruan politician
- 1958 – Nikos Anastopoulos, Greek footballer and manager
- 1958 – Filiz Koçali, Turkish journalist and politician
- 1958 – Charles White, American football player (died 2023)
- 1959 – Linda Blair, American actress
- 1960 – Michael Hutchence, Australian singer-songwriter (died 1997)
- 1961 – Quintin Dailey, American basketball player (died 2010)
- 1962 – Mizan Zainal Abidin of Terengganu, Yang di-Pertuan Agong of Malaysia
- 1963 – Diana Maldonado, American politician, member of the Texas House of Representatives
- 1964 – Nigel Benn, English-Australian boxer
- 1964 – Stojko Vranković, Croatian basketball player
- 1965 – Steven Adler, American rock drummer
- 1965 – DJ Jazzy Jeff, American DJ and producer
- 1965 – Diane Lane, American actress
- 1966 – Craig Salvatori, Australian rugby league player
- 1967 – Manabu Nakanishi (中西 学), Japanese wrestler
- 1968 – Guy Fieri, American chef, author, and television host
- 1968 – Heath, Japanese singer-songwriter and bass player (died 2023)
- 1968 – Frank Leboeuf, French footballer, sportscaster, and actor
- 1968 – Mauricio Serna, Colombian footballer
- 1969 – Olivia d'Abo, English-American singer-songwriter and actress
- 1970 – Abraham Olano, Spanish cyclist
- 1971 – Stan Collymore, English footballer and sportscaster
- 1971 – Katie Finneran, American actress
- 1972 – Terry Hill, Australian rugby league player (died 2024)
- 1972 – Gabriel Macht, American actor
- 1973 – Rogério Ceni, Brazilian footballer
- 1974 – Cameron McConville, Australian racing driver and sportscaster
- 1974 – Joseph Muscat, Maltese journalist and politician, 13th Prime Minister of Malta
- 1975 – Balthazar Getty, American actor and musician
- 1975 – David Výborný, Czech ice hockey player
- 1977 – Mario Domm, Mexican singer-songwriter, pianist, and producer
- 1977 – Hidetoshi Nakata, Japanese footballer
- 1978 – Robert Esche, American ice hockey player and sports executive
- 1978 – Chone Figgins, American baseball player
- 1979 – Carlos Ruiz, Panamanian baseball player
- 1980 – Christopher Masterson, American actor
- 1980 – Jonathan Woodgate, English footballer
- 1980 – Lizz Wright, American singer-songwriter
- 1981 – Willa Ford, American singer-songwriter, producer, and actress
- 1981 – Beverley Mitchell, American actress
- 1981 – Ben Moody, American musician, songwriter, and producer
- 1981 – Ibrahima Sonko, French footballer
- 1982 – Fabricio Coloccini, Argentine footballer
- 1982 – Jason Peters, American football player
- 1983 – Étienne Bacrot, French chess player
- 1984 – Ben Eager, Canadian ice hockey player
- 1984 – Ubaldo Jiménez, Dominican baseball player
- 1984 – Maceo Rigters, Dutch footballer
- 1985 – Nicklas Grossmann, Swedish ice hockey player
- 1985 – Fotios Papoulis, Greek footballer
- 1985 – Yan Xu, Singaporean table tennis player
- 1986 – Maher Magri, Tunisian footballer
- 1986 – Matt Simon, Australian footballer
- 1987 – Astrid Jacobsen, Norwegian skier
- 1987 – Shane Long, Irish footballer
- 1987 – Angel Olsen, American singer-songwriter
- 1987 – Ray Rice, American football player
- 1988 – Greg Oden, American basketball player
- 1988 – Marcel Schmelzer, German footballer
- 1989 – Oscar Möller, Swedish ice hockey player
- 1989 – Theo Robinson, English footballer
- 1990 – Alizé Cornet, French tennis player
- 1990 – Mike Hauschild, American baseball player
- 1990 – Logic, American rapper
- 1991 – Stefan Kolb, German footballer
- 1992 – Vincent Aboubakar, Cameroonian footballer
- 1994 – Tyrone Taylor, American baseball player
- 1996 – Dillon Brooks, Canadian basketball player
- 1996 – Sami Gayle, American actress
- 1996 – Joshua Ho-Sang, Canadian ice hockey player
- 1996 – Kumi Sasaki, Japanese singer and model
- 1997 – Fan Zhendong, Chinese table tennis player
- 1998 – Walid Cheddira, Moroccan footballer
- 1999 – Andrew Thomas, American football player
- 2000 – Laia Codina, Spanish footballer
- 2002 – Caitlin Clark, American basketball player
- 2007 – Pau Cubarsí, Spanish footballer
- 2025 – Athena Mapelli Mozzi, daughter of Princess Beatrice, born 11th in line of succession to the British throne

== Deaths ==
=== Pre-1600 ===
- 239 – Cao Rui, Chinese emperor (born 205)
- 628 – Anastasius of Persia, monk
- 906 – He, empress of the Tang Dynasty
- 935 – Ma, empress of Southern Han
- 1001 – Al-Muqallad ibn al-Musayyab, Uqaylid emir of Mosul
- 1051 – Ælfric Puttoc, archbishop of York
- 1170 – Wang Chongyang, Chinese Daoist and co-founder of the Quanzhen School (born 1113)
- 1188 – Ferdinand II of León (born 1137)
- 1341 – Louis I, Duke of Bourbon (born 1279)
- 1517 – Hadım Sinan Pasha, Ottoman politician, 32nd Grand Vizier of the Ottoman Empire (born ?)
- 1536 – Bernhard Knipperdolling, German religious leader (born 1495)
- 1536 – John of Leiden, Anabaptist leader from the Dutch city of Leiden (born 1509)
- 1552 – Edward Seymour, 1st Duke of Somerset, English general and politician, Lord High Treasurer of England (born 1500)
- 1560 – Wang Zhi, Chinese pirate
- 1575 – James Hamilton, Duke of Châtellerault (born 1516)
- 1599 – Cristofano Malvezzi, Italian organist and composer (born 1547)

=== 1601–1900 ===
- 1666 – Shah Jahan, Mughal emperor (born 1592)
- 1750 – Franz Xaver Josef von Unertl, Bavarian politician (born 1675)
- 1763 – John Carteret, 2nd Earl Granville, English politician, Lord Lieutenant of Ireland (born 1690)
- 1767 – Johann Gottlob Lehmann, German meteorologist and geologist (born 1719)
- 1779 – Jeremiah Dixon, English surveyor and astronomer (born 1733)
- 1779 – Claudius Smith, American guerrilla leader (born 1736)
- 1798 – Lewis Morris, American judge and politician (born 1726)
- 1840 – Johann Friedrich Blumenbach, German physician, physiologist, and anthropologist (born 1752)
- 1850 – Vincent Pallotti, Italian missionary and saint (born 1795)
- 1879 – Anthony Durnford, Irish colonel (born 1830)
- 1879 – Henry Pulleine, English colonel (born 1838)
- 1892 – Joseph P. Bradley, American lawyer and jurist (born 1813)
- 1900 – David Edward Hughes, Welsh-American physicist, co-invented the microphone (born 1831)

=== 1901–present ===
- 1901 – Queen Victoria of the United Kingdom (born 1819)
- 1906 – George Holyoake, English secularist, co-operator and newspaper editor (born 1817)
- 1909 – Emil Erlenmeyer, German chemist and academic (born 1825)
- 1921 – George Streeter, American captain and businessman (born 1837)
- 1922 – Fredrik Bajer, Danish educator and politician, Nobel Prize laureate (born 1837)
- 1922 – Pope Benedict XV (born 1854)
- 1922 – Camille Jordan, French mathematician and academic (born 1838)
- 1925 – Fanny Bullock Workman, American geographer and mountain climber (born 1859)
- 1927 – James Ford Rhodes, American historian and author (born 1848)
- 1929 – R. C. Lehmann, English journalist, author, and politician (born 1856)
- 1930 – Stephen Mather, American businessman and conservationist, co-founded the Thorkildsen-Mather Borax Company (born 1867)
- 1931 – László Batthyány-Strattmann, Hungarian physician and ophthalmologist (born 1870)
- 1945 – Else Lasker-Schüler, German poet and playwright (born 1869)
- 1949 – William Thomas Walsh, American author, poet, and playwright (born 1891)
- 1950 – Alan Hale, Sr., American actor and director (born 1892)
- 1951 – Harald Bohr, Danish mathematician and footballer (born 1887)
- 1951 – Lawson Robertson, Scottish-American sprinter and high jumper (born 1883)
- 1955 – Jonni Myyrä, Finnish-American athlete (born 1892)
- 1957 – Ralph Barton Perry, American philosopher and academic (born 1876)
- 1959 – Mike Hawthorn, English racing driver (born 1929)
- 1964 – Marc Blitzstein, American pianist and composer (born 1905)
- 1966 – Herbert Marshall, English actor (born 1890)
- 1968 – Duke Kahanamoku, American swimmer and water polo player (born 1890)
- 1971 – Harry Frank Guggenheim, American businessman and publisher, co-founded Newsday (born 1890)
- 1973 – Lyndon B. Johnson, American lieutenant and politician, 36th President of the United States (born 1908)
- 1977 – Ibrahim bin Abdullah Al Suwaiyel, Saudi Arabian diplomat (born 1916)
- 1978 – Oliver Leese, English general (born 1894)
- 1978 – Herbert Sutcliffe, English cricketer and soldier (born 1894)
- 1979 – Ali Hassan Salameh, Palestinian rebel leader (born 1940)
- 1980 – Yitzhak Baer, German-Israeli historian and academic (born 1888)
- 1981 – Ishtiaq Hussain Qureshi, Pakistani historian and academic (born 1903)
- 1982 – Eduardo Frei Montalva, Chilean lawyer and politician, 28th President of Chile (born 1911)
- 1985 – Arthur Bryant, English historian and journalist (born 1899)
- 1987 – R. Budd Dwyer, American educator and politician, 30th Treasurer of Pennsylvania (born 1939)
- 1989 – S. Vithiananthan, Sri Lankan author and academic (born 1924)
- 1991 – Robert Choquette, Canadian author, poet and diplomat (born 1905)
- 1993 – Kōbō Abe, Japanese playwright and photographer (born 1924)
- 1994 – Jean-Louis Barrault, French actor and director (born 1910)
- 1994 – Telly Savalas, American actor (born 1922)
- 1996 – Israel Eldad, Polish-Israeli philosopher and author (born 1910)
- 1997 – Billy Mackenzie, Scottish singer-songwriter (born 1957)
- 1999 – Graham Staines, Australian-Indian missionary and translator (born 1941)
- 2000 – Craig Claiborne, American journalist, author, and critic (born 1920)
- 2000 – Anne Hébert, Canadian author and poet (born 1916)
- 2001 – Tommie Agee, American baseball player (born 1942)
- 2001 – Roy Brown, American clown and puppeteer (born 1932)
- 2003 – Bill Mauldin, American soldier and cartoonist (born 1921)
- 2004 – Billy May, American trumpet player and composer (born 1916)
- 2004 – Tom Mead, Australian journalist and politician (born 1918)
- 2004 – Ann Miller, American actress, singer, and dancer (born 1923)
- 2005 – César Gutiérrez, Venezuelan baseball player, coach, and manager (born 1943)
- 2005 – Carlo Orelli, Italian soldier (born 1894)
- 2005 – Consuelo Velázquez, Mexican pianist and songwriter (born 1924)
- 2006 – Aydın Güven Gürkan, Turkish academic and politician, Turkish Minister of Labor and Social Security (born 1941)
- 2007 – Ngô Quang Trưởng, Vietnamese general (born 1929)
- 2007 – Abbé Pierre, French priest and activist (born 1912)
- 2007 – Liz Renay, American actress, author and performer (born 1926)
- 2008 – Heath Ledger, Australian actor and director (born 1979)
- 2008 – Miles Lerman, Polish Holocaust survivor and activist (born 1920)
- 2009 – Billy Werber, American baseball player (born 1908)
- 2010 – Louis R. Harlan, American historian and author (born 1922)
- 2010 – Jean Simmons, English-American actress (born 1929)
- 2012 – Simon Marsden, English photographer and author (born 1948)
- 2012 – Joe Paterno, American football player and coach (born 1926)
- 2012 – Clarence Tillenius, Canadian painter and environmentalist (born 1913)
- 2012 – Dick Tufeld, American actor (born 1926)
- 2013 – Robert Bonnaud, French historian and academic (born 1929)
- 2013 – Hinton Mitchem, American businessman and politician (born 1938)
- 2014 – Maziar Partow, Iranian cinematographer (born 1933)
- 2015 – Fabrizio de Miranda, Italian engineer and academic, co-designed the Rande Bridge (born 1926)
- 2015 – Wendell H. Ford, American lieutenant and politician, 53rd Governor of Kentucky (born 1924)
- 2015 – Margaret Bloy Graham, Canadian author and illustrator (born 1920)
- 2016 – Homayoun Behzadi, Iranian footballer and coach (born 1942)
- 2016 – Cecil Parkinson, English politician (born 1931)
- 2016 – Lois Ramsey, Australian actress (born 1922)
- 2016 – Kamer Genç, Turkish politician (born 1940)
- 2017 – Masaya Nakamura, Japanese businessman (born 1925)
- 2017 – Yordano Ventura, Dominican baseball player (born 1991)
- 2018 – Ursula K. Le Guin, American sci-fi and fantasy novelist (born 1929)
- 2018 – William B. Jordan, American art historian (born 1940)
- 2021 – Hank Aaron, American baseball player (born 1934)
- 2022 – Thích Nhất Hạnh, Vietnamese Thiền Buddhist monk, peace activist, and founder of the Plum Village Tradition (born 1926)
- 2023 – Lin Brehmer, American disc jockey (born 1954)
- 2026 – Hifumi Katō, Japanese professional shogi player (born 1940)

== Holidays and observances ==
- Christian feast day:
  - Anastasius of Persia
  - Gaudentius of Novara
  - László Batthyány-Strattmann
  - Laura Vicuna
  - Vincent Pallotti
  - Vincent of Saragossa
  - Vincent, Orontius, and Victor
  - Blessed William Joseph Chaminade
  - January 22 (Eastern Orthodox liturgics)
- Day of Unity of Ukraine (Ukraine)
- Grandfather's Day (Poland)
