= February 4 (Eastern Orthodox liturgics) =

Day in the Eastern Orthodox liturgical calendar

Eastern Orthodox liturgical calendar
February 3	February 4	February 5
February 4 O.S. ≍ February 17 N.S. February 4 N.S ≍ January 22 O.S.

An Eastern Orthodox cross

February 4 in Eastern Orthodox liturgical calendars is a feast day and a day of commemoration of saints and martyrs. Although some Orthodox churches use the Revised Julian Calendar and others use the traditional Julian calendar, the fixed commemorations for their respective February 4 are broadly the same, no matter which calendar is used. (Note: Despite the dates being the same, the days to which they refer typically differ by 13 days. The notation Old Style or O.S. is sometimes used to indicate a date in the traditional Julian Calendar (the "Old Calendar"). The notation New Style or N.S, indicates a date in the Revised Julian calendar (the "New Calendar").)

== Feasts ==
- Afterfeast of the Meeting of our Lord in the Temple.

== Saints ==
- Martyrs Jadorus and Isidore, who suffered under Decius (3rd century)
- Hieromartyr Phileas, Bishop of Thmuis, and Martyr Philoromus the Magistrate (c. 303) (Note: "At Thmuis, in Egypt, in the persecution of Diocletian, the passion of blessed Philaeas, bishop of that city, and of Philoromus, military tribune, who rejected the exhortations of their relations and friends to save themselves, offered themselves to death, and so merited immortal palms from God. With them was crowned with martyrdom a numberless multitude of the faithful of the same place, who followed the example of their pastor.")
- Martyr Theoctistus, by the sword.
- Venerable John of Irenopolis, Bishop of Irenopolis, Cilicia and one of the 318 fathers of Nicaea (c. 325)
- Hieromartyr Abramius of Arbela, Bishop of Arbela in Assyria (c. 344–347)
- Venerable Isidore of Pelusium (c. 436–440) (Note: Name days celebrated today include: Isidore (Ἰσίδωρος); Isidora (Ἰσιδώρα).)
- Saint Evagrius, fellow-ascetic of St. Shio of Mgvime, Georgia (6th century)
- Venerable Nicetas of Pythiae (modern Kouri) (pre-iconoclasm)
- Venerable Iasimos the Wonderworker (Jasim), monk and healer.
- Venerable Nicholas the Confessor, Abbot, of the Studion Monastery (868)

== Pre-Schism Western saints ==
- Martyrs Aquilinus, Geminus, Gelasius, Magnus and Donatus, martyrs in 'Forum Sempronii', which has been interpreted as Fossombrone in central Italy (3rd century) (Note: The names Aquilinus and Geminus are also listed on January 4 as martyrs of North Africa.)
- Martyr Eutychius, in Rome under Diocletian (4th century) (Note: He was left in prison for twelve days without food and then thrown into a well.) (Note: "At Rome, St. Eutychius, who endured a glorious martrydom, and was buried in the cemetery of Callistus. Pope St. Damasus wrote an epitaph in verse for his tomb.")
- Saint Aventinus of Chartres, Bishop of Chartres (c. 520)
- Saint Aventinus of Troyes, an almoner to St Lupus, Bishop of Troyes, then became a hermit at Saint-Aventin (c. 538)
- Saint Vincent of Troyes, Bishop of Troyes (c. 546)
- Hieromartyr Aldate of Gloucester (6th century) (Note: Famed for his resistance to the heathen invaders of Britain, in some accounts he is called Bishop of Gloucester, now in England.) (Note: "ST. Aldate, or Eldate, was a Briton, who lived at the time of the invasion of the island by the English, and is called Bishop of Gloucester. He is said to have shown much zeal in animating his fellow-countrymen to a defence of their territory, but the little related of him is so blended with the unauthentic history of the period, that it is impossible to gather any certain facts. There are churches dedicated to St. Aldate in Gloucester and in Oxford. (It has not been ascertained that there was a Bishop's See at Gloucester in British times, unless Cluvium is the same place; nor was there in later ages, until the time of the schism, when Henry VIII placed a Bishop there).")
- Saint Modan, Abbot of Stirling and Falkirk (6th century) (Note: Born in Ireland, he preached at Stirling and along the Forth in Scotland and later lived as a hermit near Dumbarton.) (Note: "S. Modan was first monk, and then abbot of Mailros, in Scotland, and preached the faith in Stirling and at Falkirk, when old he retired among the mountains of Dumbarton, and there died. His body was kept till the change of religion, with honour, in the church of Rosneath.")
- Saint Liephard, a bishop and companion of King Cædwalla of Wessex during the latter's pilgrimage to Rome, martyred near Cambrai in France (690) (Note: "According to the account preserved in the Diocese of Cambray, ST. Liephard was a Bishop from Great Britain, who on his return from Rome was murdered by pagan robbers in a wood near Cambray. His relics were venerated at Huncourt, but were subsequently translated to St. Quentin, where they were profaned and lost in the siege of A.D. 1557.")
- Saint Vulgis, Bishop and Abbot of Lobbes Abbey in Belgium (c. 760)
- Saint Nithard, a monk at Corbie Abbey in Saxony in Germany and a companion of St Ansgar, whom he followed to Sweden as a missionary, martyred there by pagan Swedes (845)
- Saint Rabanus Maurus, archbishop of Mainz (856)
- Saint Rembert, Bishop of Hamburg-Bremen (865) (Note: Born in Flanders, he became a monk at Turholt in Belgium He worked in Denmark with St Anschar and succeeded him as Bishop of Hamburg-Bremen (865).)

== Post-Schism Orthodox saints ==
- Right-Believing George Vsievolodovich of Vladimir, Great Prince of Vladimir (1238)
- Venerable Abraham and Coprius, founders of Pechenga Monastery in Vologda (15th century)
- Venerable Cyril, Abbot and Wonderworker of New Lake Monastery (Novoezersk) in Novgorod (1532) (Note: See: (in Russian) Кирилл Новоезерский. Википедии. (Russian Wikipedia).) (see also November 7)
- New Martyr Joseph of Aleppo in Syria (1686)

=== New martyrs and confessors ===
- Venerable Martyr Anthony of Supraśl (1516)
- New Martyr Joseph of Aleppo in Syria (1686)
- New Hieromartyr Methodius (Krasnoperov), Bishop of Petropavlovsk (1921) (Note: See: (in Russian) Мефодий (Краснопёров). Википедии. (Russian Wikipedia).)
- New Hieromartyrs (1938):

- Theodosius (Bobkov), Hieromonk of the Chudov Monastery, Moscow (Note: See: (in Russian) Бобков, Фёдор Петрович. Википедии. (Russian Wikipedia).)
- Nicholas Kandaurov, Archpriest, Moscow
- Boris Nazarov, Archpriest, of Protasievo, Verey
- Alexander Pokrovsky, Archpriest, of Mineyevo, Moscow
- Alexander Sokolov, Archpriest, of Paveltsovo, Moscow
- Peter Sokolov, Archpriest, of Klin, Moscow
- John Tikhomirov, Archpriest, of Petrovskoye, Moscow (Note: See: (in Russian) Тихомиров, Иоанн Петрович. Википедии. (Russian Wikipedia).)
- Nicholas Pospelov, priest, of Bylovo, Podolsk
- Virgin-martyr Raphaela Vishnyakova, Schemanun, of Moscow

- Seraphim Vavilov, Archdeacon
- Alexy Knyazhesky, priest
- Nikolay Golyshev, priest
- Arkady Lobtsov, priest
- Mikhail Rybin, priest
- Alexei Lebedev, priest
- Andrew Bednov, priest
- Dimitri Kedrolivansky, priest
- John Artobolevsky, Archpriest, Moscow (Note: See: (in Russian) Артоболевский, Иван Алексеевич. Википедии. (Russian Wikipedia).)
- John Aleshkovsky, priest
- Alexander Minervin, priest
- Alexis Sharov, priest (Note: See: (in Russian) Шаров, Алексей Дмитриевич. Википедии. (Russian Wikipedia).)
- Eustace Sokolsky, priest
- Sergius Soloviev, priest
- Virgin-martyrs Anna Efremova, Maria Vinogradova and Ekaterina Dekalina (Note: See: (in Russian) Екатерина (Декалина). Википедии. (Russian Wikipedia).)

- Martyrs John Shuvalov, Basil Ivanov, Demetry Ilyinsky, Theodore Palshkov, and Demetry Kazamatsky (1938)

== Other commemorations ==
- Repose of the royal recluse Nun Dosithea of Moscow (1810)

== Icon gallery ==
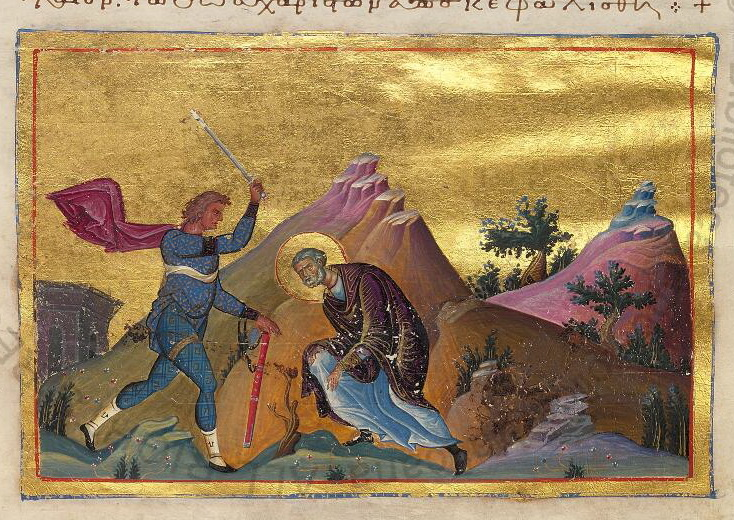
Hieromartyr Abramius of Arbela, Bishop of Arbela in Assyria.
(Menologion of Basil II, 10th century).

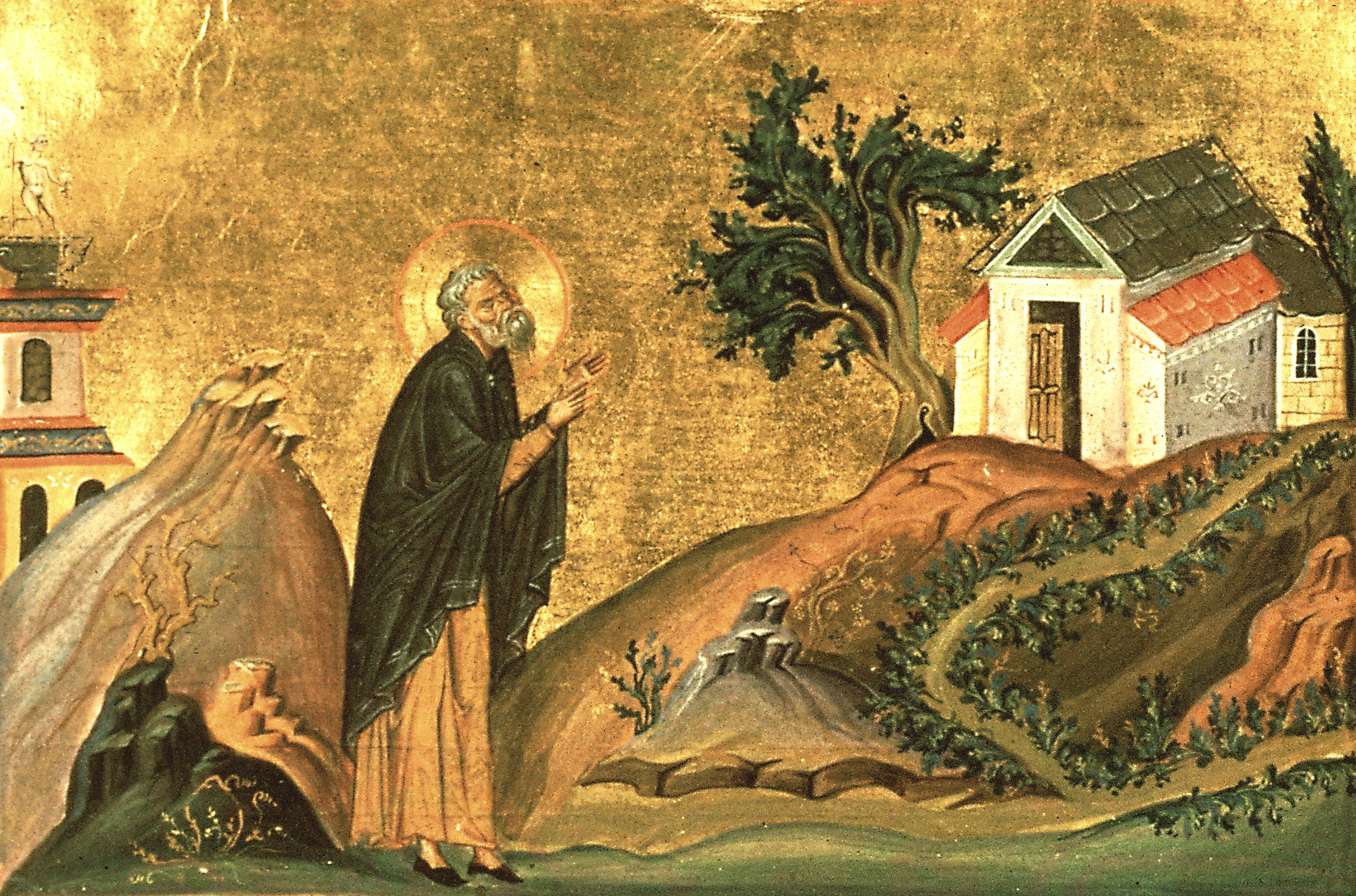
Venerable Isidore of Pelusium.
(Menologion of Basil II, 10th century).

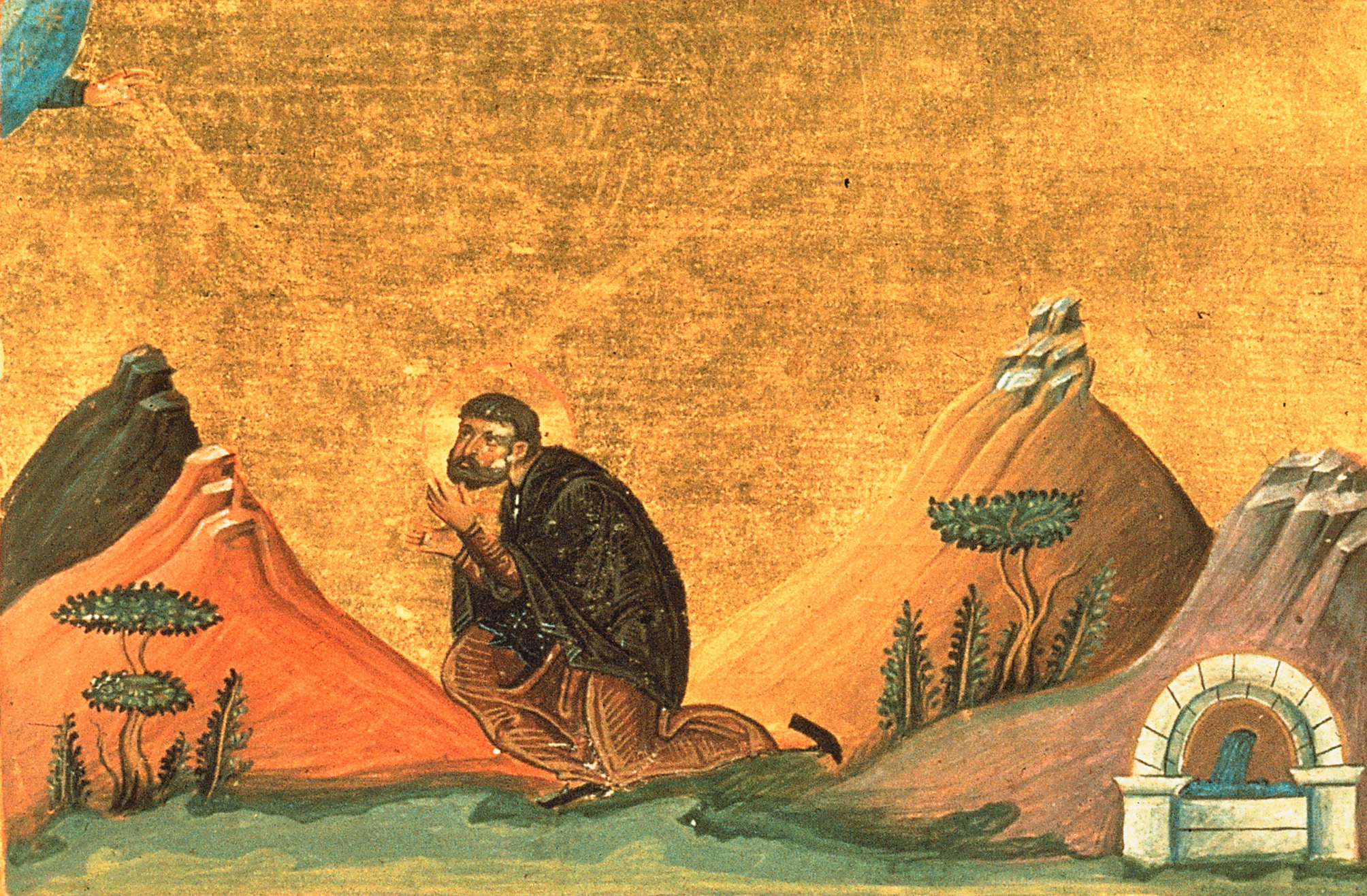
Venerable Nicholas the Confessor, Abbot, of the Studion Monastery.
(Menologion of Basil II, 10th century).

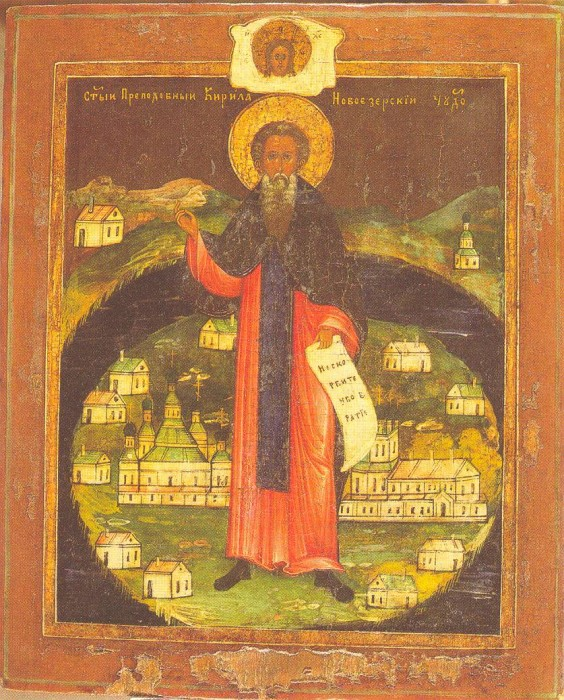
Venerable Cyril of Novoezersk.

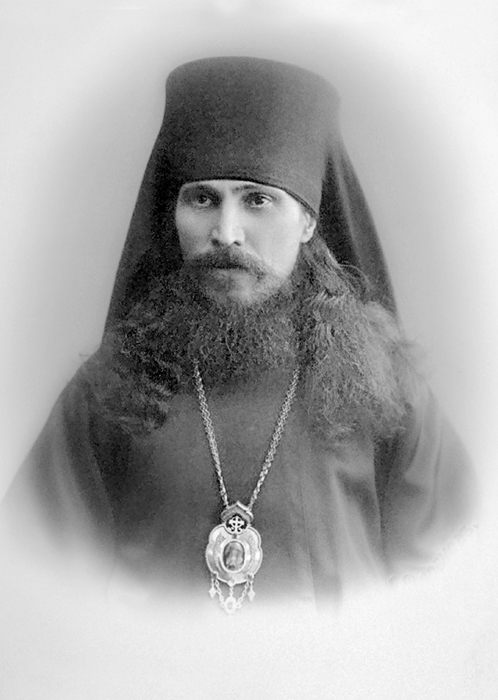
New Hieromartyr Methodius (Krasnoperov), Bishop of Petropavlovsk.

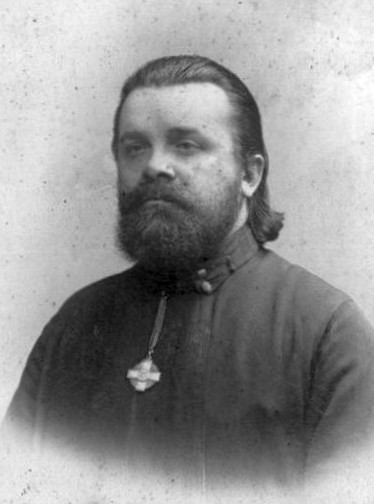
New Hieromartyr John Artobolevsky, Archpriest.

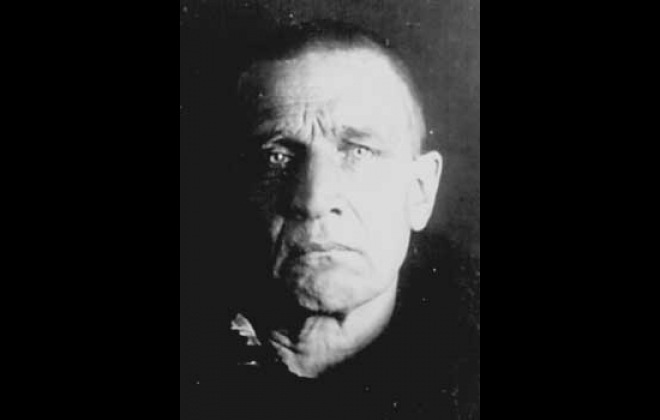
New Hieromartyr Alexis Sharov, Archpriest.

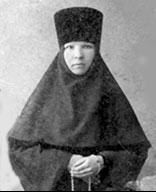
Virgin-martyr Ekaterina Dekalina.

== Sources ==
- February 4 / 17. Orthodox Calendar (Pravoslavie.ru).
- February 17 / 4. Holy Trinity Russian Orthodox Church (A parish of the Patriarchate of Moscow).
- February 4. OCA - The Lives of the Saints.
- The Autonomous Orthodox Metropolia of Western Europe and the Americas. St. Hilarion Calendar of Saints for the year of our Lord 2004. St. Hilarion Press (Austin, TX). p. 12.
- The Fourth Day of the Month of February. Orthodoxy in China.
- February 4. Latin Saints of the Orthodox Patriarchate of Rome.
- The Roman Martyrology. Transl. by the Archbishop of Baltimore. Last Edition, According to the Copy Printed at Rome in 1914. Revised Edition, with the Imprimatur of His Eminence Cardinal Gibbons. Baltimore: John Murphy Company, 1916. pp. 37–38.
- Rev. Richard Stanton. A Menology of England and Wales, or, Brief Memorials of the Ancient British and English Saints Arranged According to the Calendar, Together with the Martyrs of the 16th and 17th Centuries. London: Burns & Oates, 1892. pp. 51–54.

Greek Sources

- Great Synaxaristes: (in Greek) 4 Φεβρουαρίου. Μεγασ Συναξαριστησ.
- (in Greek) Συναξαριστής. 4 Φεβρουαρίου. Ecclesia.gr. (H Εκκλησια Τησ Ελλαδοσ).

Russian Sources

- (in Russian) 17 февраля (4 февраля). Православная Энциклопедия под редакцией Патриарха Московского и всея Руси Кирилла (электронная версия). (Orthodox Encyclopedia - Pravenc.ru).
- (in Russian) 4 февраля по старому стилю / 17 февраля по новому стилю. Русская Православная Церковь - Православный церковный календарь на 2018 год.
