= St Aldates =

St Aldate's may refer to:

- St Aldate's, Oxford, a street in Oxford
- St Aldate's Church, an Anglican church in Oxford
- St Aldate, a former Bishop of Gloucester
