= Vissarion of the Agathonos =

Greek Eastern Orthodox monk and saint

Saint Vissarion of the Agathonos

St. Vissarion of the Agathonos
- Born: Andreas Korkoliakos; 1908; Petalidi, Messenia, Peloponnese, Greece
- Residence: Agathonos Monastery, Greece
- Died: 22 January 1991 (aged 82–83); Hospital "Sotiria", Athens, Greece
- Venerated in: Eastern Orthodox Church
- Canonized: 14 June 2022 by Ecumenical Patriarchate of Constantinople
- Major shrine: Agathonos Monastery, Phthiotis, Central Greece (region)
- Feast: January 22
- Tradition or genre: Degrees of Eastern Orthodox monasticism

Vissarion of the Agathonos (Greek: Άγιος Βησσαρίων ο Αγαθωνίτης), secular name: Andreas Korkoliakos (Greek: Ανδρέας Κορκολιάκος; 1908–22 January 1991), was a Greek Orthodox monk and Saint of the Agathonos Monastery, close to Lamia, Central Greece. He became a monk in his teen years and was regarded by those who knew him as an especially good-hearted cleric with humanitarian spirit.

Venerable Elder Vissarion was canonized on 14 June 2022 by the Holy Synod of the Ecumenical Patriarchate, and the church commemorates his feast day on January 22.

== Tomb opening ==
Vissarion (Bessarion) became famous after the opening of his tomb in March 2006, during which Monks and coroners found his body in pristine condition. The event caused sensation and amazement not only in the local prefecture of Phthiotida but also to the whole of Greece, especially after exposure of the event on Greek television.

The relics of Vissarion were inspected for first time by the retired professor and famous Athens coroner Panayiotis Yamarelos, who spoke on television about an extraordinary and inexplicable event. More specifically, the phrases of Yamarelos about Vissarion's extremely well preserved body and his statement regarding the face being in such pristine condition that it "was ready to talk to you", caused a commotion.

The Bishop of Phthiotida, Nikolaos, said that the Church should not be in a hurry to announce any kind of sanctity of the monk Vissarion, and that the issue should be discussed at the Holy Synod of the Church of Greece in Athens.

However, after the publication of this extraordinary event by the Greek media, hundreds of believers from the area of Phthiotida and other parts of Greece, arrived at the Agathonos Monastery in order to venerate the body of Vissarion.

=== Reaction ===
The issue of the incorruptibility of Vissarion's remains caused a tumult within the scientific community in Greece. The coroner, Nikos Karakoukis, spoke about the possibility of a natural mummification because of the place in which Vissarion's body was buried. More specifically, as Karakoukis and other medical examiners said, the lack of oxygen in the place of burial, as well as the dry condition which existed in the tomb, could cause mummification of the body.

The retired coroner, Panayiotis Yamarelos, proposed to Bishop Nikolaos that the body should remain in a feretory, in a specific place inside the monastery for another two or three years; in order to give a better idea to the medical examiners and Church depending on its preservation in pristine condition or its decomposition in the future.

After the publication of photographs of Vissarion's relics in a daily Greek tabloid, the president of coroners Nikos Karakoukis asked from the Bishop of phthiotida to permit scientific research of a team of medical examiners on Monk's body in order to publish a conclusion for the case. Moreover, coroner Karakoukis denied the opinion of his colleague Panayiotis Yamarelos and spoke about a case which could have a logical explanation through the science of medical jurisprudence.
