= Panayiotis Yamarelos =

Greek medical examiner (died 2006)

Panayiotis Yamarellos (Greek: Παναγιώτης Γιαμαρέλλος, 19??-2006), also called as Panos Yamarellos/Giamarellos, was a Greek retired university professor of medical jurisprudence and arguably the most famous coroner in Greece, based in Athens. He was for many years the Head of the Medical Examiners of Greece. He has received various awards for his work in the field of medical jurisprudence and published thousands of projects and works in Greece and abroad.

He has been involved in hundreds of death cases in Greece as a medical examiner, with most famous to be the crime of a man who killed and dismembered his fiancee in 1987, the case of soldier Romiopoulos' suspicious death in 1997 and the case of Monk Vissarion Korkoliacos.

Panayiotis Yamarellos died of heart failure in hospital "Evagelismos", Athens, on April 28, 2006.
