= Agathonos Monastery =

Greek Orthodox male monastery in Phthiotis, Greece

Coordinates: 38°52′02″N 22°12′19″E

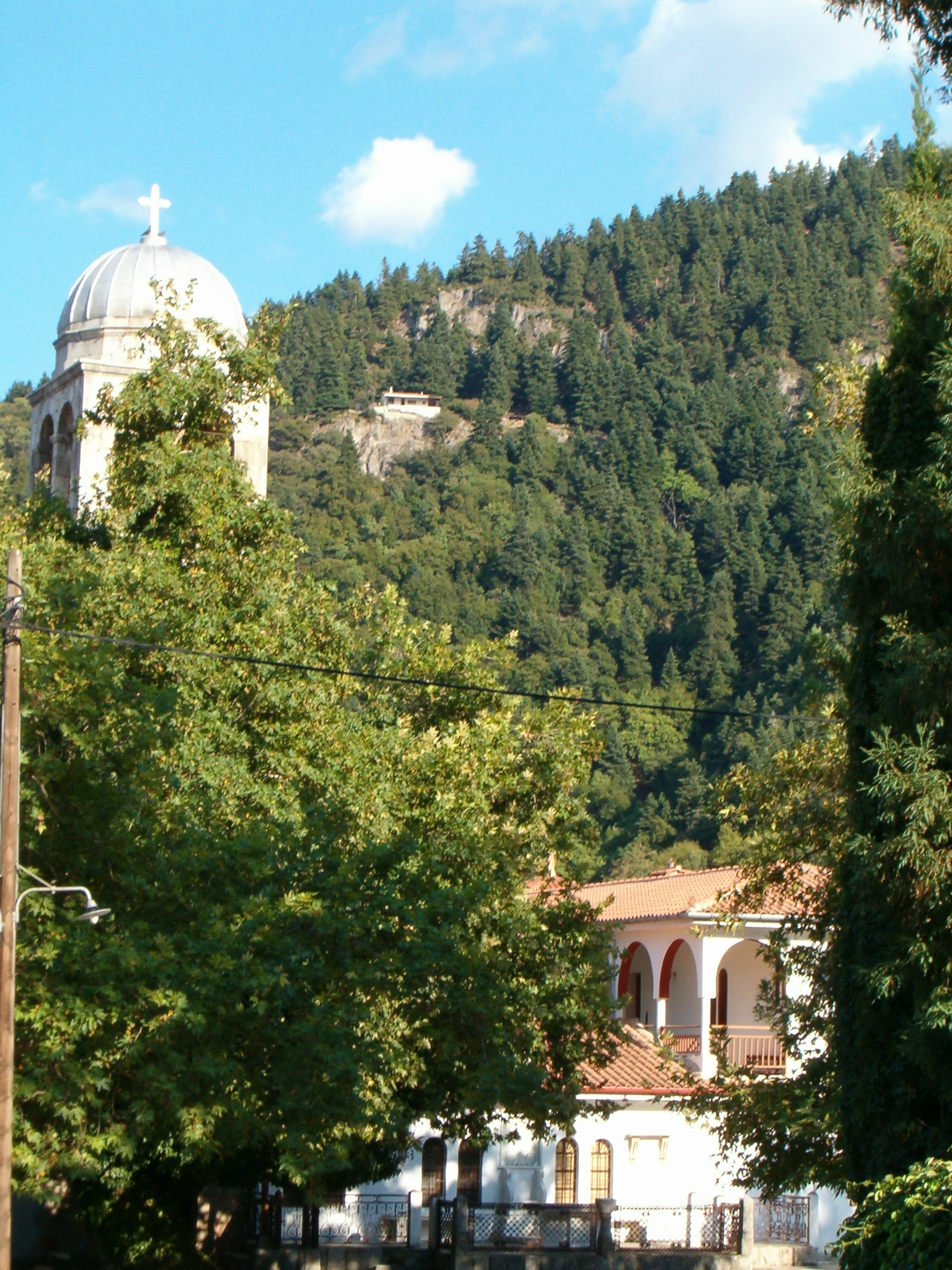
Agathonos Monastery, 2007.

The Agathonos Monastery (Greek: Μονή Αγάθωνος) is a Greek Orthodox male monastery in Phthiotis, Central Greece.

The monastery is located on the northern slopes of Mount Oeta, some 3 km west of the town of Ypati.

The monastery's katholikon dates to the 15th century, which is also when the monastery was probably founded, although it may have antecedents as early as 1271, when the ruler of Thessaly, John I Doukas, received horses in the locality.

The katholikon is of the Athonite variety of the cross-in-square church with two conchs, narthex, and exonarthex, with four attached chapels on each corner. The main church is dedicated to the Virgin Mary, and the chapels to the Transfiguration (southeast), the Holy Apostles (northeast), Saint Charalambos (northwest), and Saint John (southwest). Its interior decoration dates to three clearly discernible phases: the 16th–17th centuries, the 18th century, and the 20th century. The monastery served as a refuge for Greek rebels during the early stages of the Greek War of Independence, and was burned down by the Ottoman Turks, with the katholikon's roof and dome being rebuilt afterwards. The rest of the monastery buildings are of more recent construction, with the originals having been destroyed.

In 1959, the alleged tomb of St. Agathon was discovered in the south wall of the katholikon. The noted Greek Resistance member Germanos Dimakos was abbot (hegumenos) of the monastery until 1940.

Since 1985, the monastery also houses the Oiti Natural History Museum (Μουσείο Φυσικής Ιστορίας Οίτης), dedicated to the geology, climate, flora and fauna of Mount Oeta and its national park.

== See also ==
- Saint Augustine of Hippo and Seraphim of Sarov Monastery
- Panagia Chrysopodaritissa
