= Panagia Chrysopodaritissa =

Panagia Chrysopodaritissa Monastery
- Μονή Παναγίας Χρυσοποδαρίτισσας
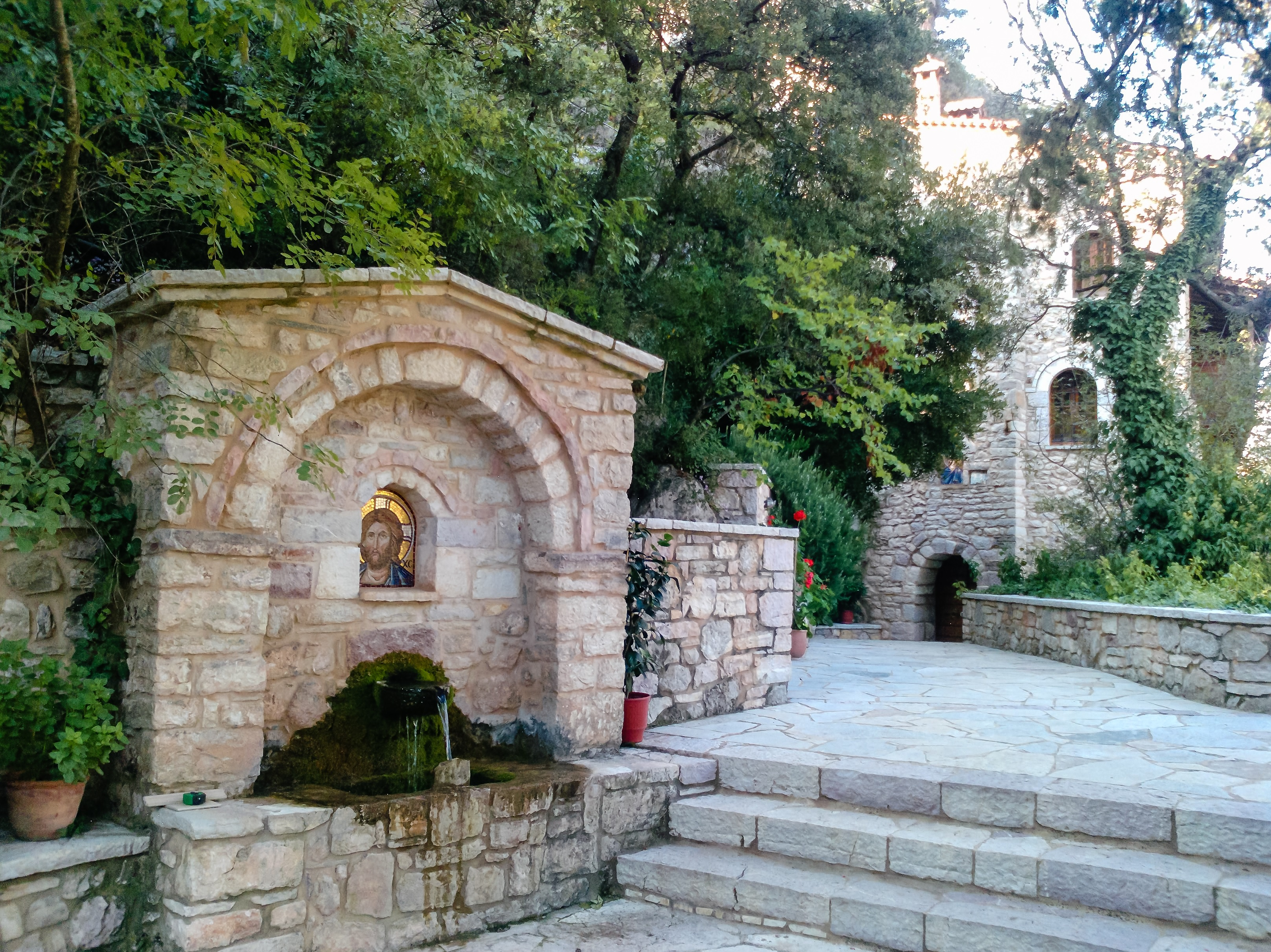

Monastery information
- Established: 12th century
- Dedicated to: Dormition of Theotokos
- Celebration date: August 23
- Diocese: Metropolis of Patras

Site
- Location: Chrysopigi, Erymanthos, Achaea
- Country: Greece
- Coordinates: 38°2′48″N 21°51′6″E

The Panagia Chrysopodaritissa Monastery (Greek: Μονή Παναγίας Χρυσοποδαρίτισσας, lit. 'Monastery of Panagia of the Golden Feet') is a men's communal monastery, founded at the end of the 12th century.

Dedicated to Dormition of Theotokos and celebrating on August 23, the day of the Apodosis of the Dormition. The monastery is prohibited to women with the only exception on 23 August. It has been declared a protected monument by the Ministry of Culture of Greece and nowadays it is the patron of the Municipality of Erymanthos.

It is one of the oldest monasteries of Achaea, but the exact date of its foundation is unknown. It is likely that it was built at the end of the 12th century and the first church functioned inside a cave with stalagmites on the walls of which hagiographies are preserved. Before its foundation there were hermitages in the area. 15th-century frescoes have been discovered as well as a 14th-century manuscript trace its foundation at least to late Byzantine times (1204 AD - 1453 AD) and earlier.

== Location ==
It is located in mountainous Achaia, approximately in the central part of the prefecture and specifically in the historical area of Nezera, administratively under the Local Community of Chrysopigi of the Municipality of Erymanthos.

It is built on a cave of Erymanthos, almost at the bottom of the Piros river valley and near its banks, surrounded by centuries-old trees and gardens. It is about 20 km by road from Chalandritsa, 40 km from Patras and 44 km from Kalavryta.

== Designation ==
According to local folk tradition, there are three versions for the name of the monastery: either it is due to the gold dedication of a believer for the treatment of his leg or feet, invoking the help of Theotokos, or from the "golden", i.e. miraculous, leg of Theotokos who rushes to help when she is invoked, or from the fact that the icon of Theotokos was moved, when the monastery was to be built in a different location from the cave in which it had been found.

== Sources ==
- Λουλούδης, Θεόδωρος Η. (2010). Αχαΐα: Οικισμοί, Οικιστές, Αυτοδιοίκηση. Πάτρα: Νομαρχιακή Επιχείρηση Πολιτιστικής Ανάπτυξης Ν.Α. Αχαΐας.
- Τριανταφύλλου, Κώστας Ν. (1995). "Χρυσοποδαρίτισσα". Ιστορικόν Λεξικόν των Πατρών. Vol. 2 (3η ed.). Πάτρα: Τυπογραφείο Πέτρου Χρ. Κούλη.
