= Carlo Orelli =

Italian soldier (1894–2005)

- Carlo Orelli during the First World War
- Born: 23 December 1894; Perugia, Umbria, Italy
- Died: 22 January 2005 (aged 110 years, 30 days); Garbatella, Rome, Lazio, Italy
- Military career
- Allegiance: Italy
- Branch: Royal Italian Army
- Service years: 1915–???
- Nickname: "The Last Infantryman"
- Unit: 32nd Infantry Regiment (Siena Brigade)
- Conflicts: World War I
- Awards: Grand Officer of the Order of Merit of the Italian Republic
- Other work: Mechanic

Carlo Orelli (23 December 1894 – 22 January 2005) was, at age 110, the last surviving Italian World War I veteran who joined the army at the onset of the war. Born in Perugia, although he lived in Rome for most of his life, Orelli came from a military family whose members had served in various Italian conflicts since 1849. A mechanic by trade, Orelli joined the Italian Army in May 1915 and engaged in combat operations in Italy. His recollections were marked by particularly brutal experiences of trench warfare, including the violent deaths of many of his friends. After receiving injuries to his leg, he was pulled from active duty and returned home.

After recovering from a related infection, Orelli married and had a family of six children. During World War II, despite his aversion to Nazi Germany and fascism, he was forced to work as an artillery director in Italy. At war's end, he returned to work as a mechanic, retiring in 1960. In his later years, he was active in urging others not to forget the lessons learned after the first World War, and in 2003 he was made a Grand Officer in the Order of Merit of the Italian Republic. He died in January 2005, a month after having turned 110 and achieving supercentenarian status. At the time of his death, he was Italy's oldest survivor of the First World War, the last remaining trench infantryman and the last survivor from Italy's entry into the war.

== Early life ==
Orelli was born in Perugia on 23 December 1894, although his family soon moved to Rome to be nearer to an aunt that operated a local tavern. Carlo came from a long history of military activity. His maternal grandfather, Thomas, helped defend Perugia against Austrian mercenaries in 1849, while Carlo's father served in the Italian Abyssinian campaign during the Scramble for Africa in the 1880s. His elder brother, Alfredo, fought in Libya during the Italo-Turkish War in 1911, while his younger brother, William, fought in World War II and was captured by the British in July 1943. He lived in the Garbatella district, one of the most secluded areas of Rome, on the fourth floor of a house without an elevator. Before joining the war, he trained to become a mechanic.

== Military career ==
Orelli signed up for active duty at the age of 21 and joined the Austro-Hungarian front at the onset of the war in May 1915. Entrenched with the 320 Infantry Regiment, he served as a foot soldier within the Italian Army and engaged in combat activity in the trenches near Trieste, which was the main battleground in the east. He also participated in combat operations around the Isonzo river. In his autobiography, Orelli went into great detail about his experiences, including the large number of casualties that he witnessed during his time in the trenches and widespread illiteracy among the peasant soldiers. He referred to them as having "died in silence." He also recalled many violent deaths, such as a friend who bled to death after his feet were severed and another who was decapitated in mid-conversation with Orelli. He remarked of episodes such as this that they were "things I do not wish to remember."

In interviews, he also described the experiences of fear that were common among the soldiers, and lamented the way in which films portrayed combat experiences. When it came to cannon shells, for example, the impact was not immediate, but approached with a gradual and frightful sound. He referred to the chances of the shell exploding as the "lottery of death." While he remembers many soldiers turning to liquor to quell their fears, Orelli always refused it when offered. In order to mentally prepare himself for an attack, overcome this fear and keep a clear head, he forced himself to purge his mind of all thoughts of home and family. Orelli was eventually wounded in the right leg, an injury that ended his military career and sent him home. Despite having vivid memories of the war itself, he recalled little of the events immediately following his injury. During a confrontation with a group of Austrian soldiers, he was wounded in the leg and the left ear, a wound that was only a few inches away from being fatal. After being taken to a nearby farmhouse, he spent the rest of the war recovering from infection in hospitals, of which he remembered little.

== Post-World War I ==
After the war, Orelli resumed his previous occupation as a mechanic. He had six children after the war with his wife Cecilia, one son and five daughters born between 1920 and 1935, all of whom survived him. He also had nine grandchildren and eleven great-grandchildren at the time of his death. Although he was opposed to fascism, he found himself directing artillery in Gaeta during the Second World War. After the war, he returned to Rome and settled down with his family in Garbatella. He retired from his mechanic job in 1960 and his wife died in 1969. In his later years, he was active in telling tales of his experiences in the First World War, imploring those who listened to "not forget our sacrifice." In 2003, on the occasion of his 109th birthday, Italian President Carlo Azeglio Ciampi made Orelli a Grand Officer in the Order of Merit of the Italian Republic.

Towards the end of his life, Orelli was known as "The Last Infantryman," which later became the title of the wartime memoirs that he published in 2004. At the time of his death, many sources incorrectly reported him as having been the last Italian World War I veteran. While this was incorrect, he was Italy's oldest survivor of the First World War, the last remaining trench infantryman, and the last survivor from when Italy first entered the war in 1915.

== See also ==
- List of last surviving World War I veterans by country
