= Maher Magri =

Tunisian footballer

Personal information
- Full name: Maher Magri
- Date of birth: 22 January 1986 (age 40)
- Place of birth: El Kef, Tunisia
- Height: 1.75 m (5 ft 9 in)
- Position: Midfielder

Senior career*
Years	Team	Apps	(Gls)
2006–2010	Espérance Sportive de Tunis	21	(0)
2010–2011	Tennis Borussia Berlin	9	(0)

International career
	Tunisia U-21	1	(0)
- * Club domestic league appearances and goals

Maher Magri (born 22 January 1986 in El Kef) is a Tunisian footballer.

Magri signed for Espérance Sportive de Tunis in August 2006 as a 20-year-old and played in the Tunisian Ligue Professionnelle 1 for four years before moving to Tennis Borussia Berlin in September 2010 on a free transfer.

Magri has one cap for the Tunisian U-21 national football team.

== Honours ==
- Tunisian Ligue Professionnelle 1 champions with Espérance Sportive de Tunis in 2008–09, and 2009–10
