= Saint Augustine of Hippo and Seraphim of Sarov Monastery =

- Μονή Αγίων Αυγουστίνου Ιππώνος και Σεραφείμ του Σαρώφ
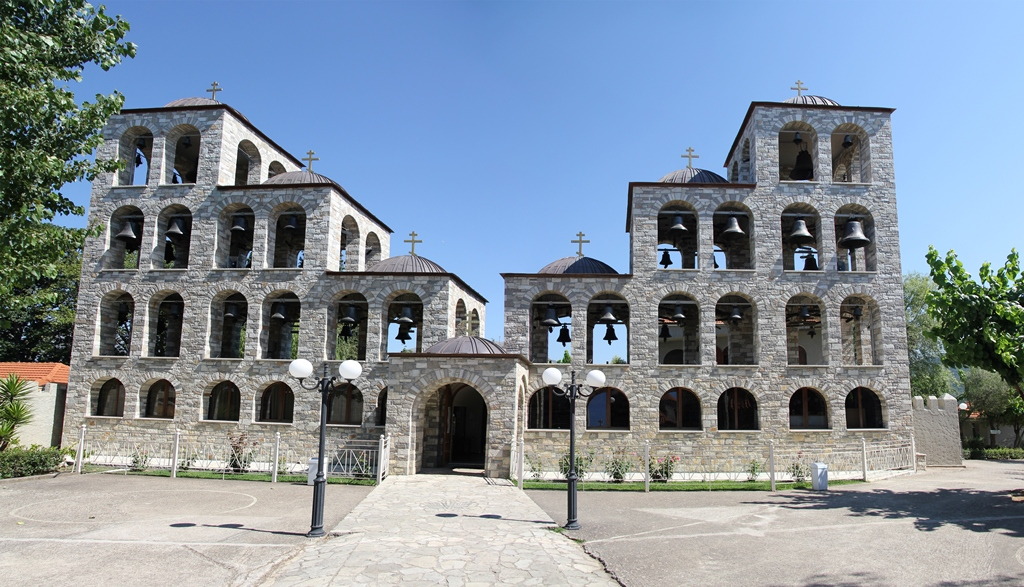
- Interactive map of Saint Augustine of Hippo and Seraphim of Sarov Monastery

Monastery information
- Established: 1991
- Dedicated to: Augustine of Hippo and Seraphim of Sarov
- Celebration date: July 19
- Diocese: Metropolis of Phocis

Site
- Location: Trikorfo, Phocis
- Country: Greece
- Coordinates: 38°27′16″N 21°54′54″E

The Saint Augustine of Hippo and Seraphim of Sarov Monastery (Greek: Μονή Αγίων Αυγουστίνου Ιππώνος και Σεραφείμ του Σαρώφ) is an Orthodox Christian men's communal monastery that belongs to the Holy Metropolis of Phocis and was founded in 1991, by Archimandrite and Elder Nektarios Moulatsiotis, who is still the abbot of the Monastery. It is located NE of Nafpaktos at a distance of 13.5 km, near the village of Trikorfo in Phocis, and is built at an altitude of 600m.

== History ==
The history of the Holy Monastery of Saints Augustine of Hippo and Seraphim of Sarov officially begins in 1991 with the installation of the first monks. Founder and Abbot of the Holy Monastery and spiritual guide is Elder Archimandrite Nektarios Moulatsiotis.

In 1984 he decides to build Christian youth camps and returns to Trikorfo, where he begins with the help of God the work. In 1991, the first trainee monks arrived and the manning of the Monastery began.

On August 15, 1993, the Church (katholikon) of the Monastery and the magnificent bell tower with its 400 signs and 62 bells were founded – as a minimum honor and revival of the legendary bell tower of Hagia Sophia in Istanbul.

On June 15, 1994, the first Divine Liturgy will be celebrated in the erected Church on the feast day of Saint Augustine and his mother Saint Monica.

On July 19 of the same year, on the feast day of Saint Seraphim of Sarov, the bell tower was inaugurated. The legendary Belfry - a symbol of the glory of Orthodoxy and Greece that fell silent in 1453, was about to ring again amidst sacrifices and tears of joy in the Monastery of Trikorfo.

Saint Seraphim of Sarov is a healing saint who works miracles on the sick. In a miraculous way, he made his presence evident in 1990 for the first time in the Monastery to campers, believers and monks, at the time of the common prayer that the Elder did one evening during the camping season, when he asked for a sign from God that their prayer was being heard.

Bright beams of light then surrounded the space and everything became like day. The date was July 19, the feast of the Saint (collection of his relics), but at that time no one yet knew Saint Seraphim of Sarov. However, the Saint of joy showed the Elder through two other miraculous events his protection and his love for the Monastery that he finally chose to become his home.

Thus, through the love and grace of both Saints, the Monastery became known as the "Holy Monastery of Saints Augustine of Hippo and Seraphim of Sarov". 30 monks leave the Monastery.

== Katholikon (main church) of the Monastery ==
The katholikon (main church) of the Monastery is dedicated to Saint Augustine of Hippo and Saint Seraphim of Sarov. The katholikon has a cruciform plan and a dome. The handmade wood-carved iconostasis has been crafted in Agiaso, Lesvos.

Its frescoes show the scenes from the lives of the Saints, as well as from the Old Testament. In the Holy Altar, according to the monastic Tradition, the Holy Altar is covered by a wood-carved Tabernacle whose canopy is supported by four angels in supplication. In the Holy Altar there are three Holy Tables. The central one is dedicated to Saints Augustine and Seraphim and the other two to Saint Nicholas and Saint Sophia.

== Sources ==
- Αρχιμ. Αυγουστίνου Σύρρου & Αρχιμ. Νεκταρίου Θεοδωρικάκου, Ιστορικό Ιεράς Μονής Αγίων Αυγουστίνου & Σεραφείμ Σάρωφ Τρικόρφου Φωκίδος, Έκδοση 7η, 2006.
