= Krtolije =

- Village
- Location within Bosnia and Herzegovina
- Coordinates: 44.5404637°N 18.6062558°E
- Country: Bosnia and Herzegovina
- Entity: Federation of Bosnia and Herzegovina
- Canton: Tuzla
- Municipality: Tuzla

Area
  - Total: 0.54 sq mi (1.40 km^{2})

Population (2013)
  - Total: 39
  - Density: 72/sq mi (28/km^{2})
- Time zone: UTC+1 (CET)
  - Summer (DST): UTC+2 (CEST)

Krtolije is a village in the municipality of Tuzla, Tuzla Canton, Bosnia and Herzegovina.

== Demographics ==
According to the 2013 census, its population was 39.

Ethnicity in 2013
Ethnicity	Number	Percentage
Croats	30	76.9%
Bosniaks	1	2.6%
Serbs	1	2.6%
other/undeclared	7	17.9%
Total	39	100%
