= Phileas and Philoromus =

Saints Phileas and Philoromus
- Born: 3rd century Egypt
- Died: c. 306; Alexandria, Egypt
- Feast: 4 February (Roman calendar); 26 November (Eastern calendar)

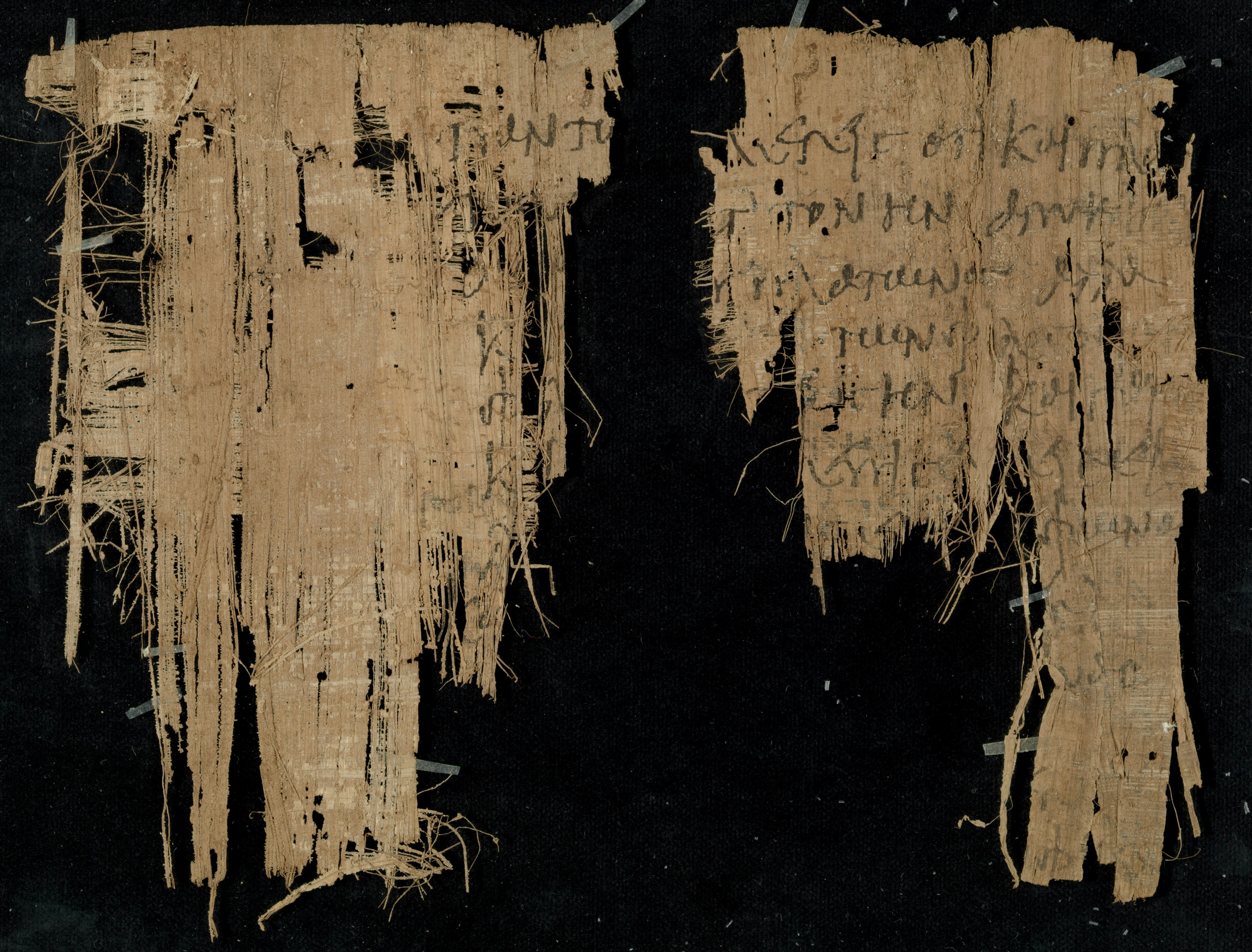
Papyri with an Acts of Phileas and Philoromus, the most important christian text about their martyrdom. Egypt, 300-350 A.D. Chester Beatty Library

Saints Phileas and Philoromus (died c. 306) were two Egyptian martyrs under the Emperor Diocletian. Phileas was Bishop of Thmuis and Philoromus was a senior imperial officer.

== Jerome's account ==
From De viris illustribus (4th century):

Phileas, a resident of that Egyptian city which is called Thmuis, of noble family, and no small wealth, having become bishop, composed a finely written work in praise of martyrs and arguing against the judge who tried to compel him to offer sacrifices, was beheaded for Christ during the same persecution in which Lucianus was put to death at Nicomedia.

== Monks of Ramsgate account ==
The monks of St Augustine's Abbey, Ramsgate wrote in their Book of Saints (1921),

Philseas and Others (SS.) MM. (Feb. 4)
(4th cent.) Martyrs whose Passion is related by the contemporary historian Eusebius. Saint Philseas was Bishop of Thumuis, an ancient city of Lower Egypt. He was beheaded, on account of his religion, under Diocletian about A.D. 306. With him suffered Saint Philoromus, an Imperial officer of distinction. Their execution had been preceded by the doing to death of numerous Christians, inhabitants of Thumuis and its neighbourhood. To their heroic constancy in the Faith, Saint Philseas himself bears Witness in a letter Eusebius has preserved to us.

== Butler's account ==
The hagiographer Alban Butler (1710–1773) wrote in his Lives of the Fathers, Martyrs, and Other Principal Saints,

Saint Phileas, and Saint Philoromus, Bishop of Thmuis, Martyrs

Phileas was a rich nobleman of Thmuis in Egypt, very eloquent and learned. Being converted to the faith, he was chosen bishop of that city; but was taken and carried prisoner to Alexandria by the persecutors, under the successors of Dioclesian. Eusebius has preserved part of a letter which he wrote in his dungeon, and sent to his flock to comfort and encourage them. Describing the sufferings of his fellow confessors at Alexandria, he says, that every one had full liberty allowed to insult, strike, and beat them with rods, whips, or clubs. Some of the confessors, with their hands behind their backs, were tied to pillars, their bodies stretched out with engines, and their sides, belly, thighs, legs, and cheeks hideously torn with iron hooks: others were hung by one hand, suffering excessive pain by the stretching of their joints: others hung by both hands, their bodies being drawn down. The governor thought no treatment too bad for Christians. Some expired on the racks; others expired soon after they were taken down: others were laid on their backs in the dungeons, with their legs stretched out in the wooden stocks to the fourth hole, etc. Culcian, who had been prefect at Thebais, was then governor of all Egypt, under the tyrant Maximinus, but afterwards lost his head in 313, by the order of Licinius. We have a long interrogatory of Saint Phileas before him from the presidial registers. Culcian, after many other things, asked him, “Was Christ God?” The saint answered, “Yes;” and alleged his miracles as a proof of his divinity. The governor professed a great regard for his quality and merit, and said: “If you were in misery, or necessity, you should be despatched without more ado; but as you have riches and estates sufficient not only for yourself and family, but for the maintenance almost of a whole province, I pity you, and do all in my power to save you.” The counsellors and lawyers, desirous also of saving him, said: “He had already sacrificed in the Phrontisterium (or academy for the exercises of literature.”) Phileas cried out: “I have not by any immolation; but say barely that I have sacrificed, and you will say no more than the truth.” Having been confined there some time, he might perhaps have said mass in that place.

His wife, children, brother, and other relations, persons of distinction, and Pagans, were present at the trial. The governor hoping to overcome him by tenderness for them, said:—“See how sorrowful your wife stands with her eyes fixed upon you.” Phileas replied: “Jesus Christ, the Saviour of souls, calls me to his glory: and he can also, if he pleases, call my wife.” The counsellors, out of compassion, said to the judge: “Phileas begs a delay.” Culcian said to him: “I grant it you most willingly, that you may consider what to do.” Phileas replied: “I have considered, and it is my unchangeable resolution to die for Jesus Christ.” Then all the counsellors, the emperor’s lieutenant, who was the first magistrate of the city, all the other officers of justice, and his relations, fell down together at his feet, embracing his knees, and conjuring him to have compassion on his disconsolate family, and not to abandon his children to their tender years whilst his presence was absolutely necessary for them. But he, like a rock unshaken by the impetuous waves that dash against it, stood unmoved; and raising his heart to God, protested aloud that he owned no other kindred but the apostles and martyrs. Philoromus a noble Christian was present: he was a tribune or colonel, and the emperor’s treasurer-general in Alexandria, and had his tribunal in the city, where he sat every day hearing and judging causes, attended by many officers in great state. Admiring the prudence and inflexible courage of Phileas, and moved with indignation against his adversaries, he cried out to them: “Why strive ye to overcome this brave man, and to make him, by an impious compliance with men, renounce God? Do not you see that, contemplating the glory of heaven, he makes no account of earthly things?” This speech drew upon him the indignation of the whole assembly, who in rage demanded that both might be condemned to die. To which the judge readily assented.

As they were led out to execution, the brother of Phileas, who was a judge, said to the governor: “Phileas desires his pardon.” Culcian therefore called him back, and asked him if it were true. He answered: “No: God forbid. Do not listen to this unhappy man. Far from desiring the reversion of my sentence, I think myself much obliged to the emperors, to you, and to your court, for by your means I become co-heir with Christ, and shall enter this very day into the possession of his kingdom.” Hereupon he was remanded to the place of execution, where having made his prayer aloud, and exhorted the faithful to constancy and perseverance, he was beheaded with Philoromus. The exact time of their martyrdom is not known, but it happened between the years 306 and 312. Their names stand in the ancient martyrologies.

== Lardner's account ==
Nathaniel Lardner (1684–1768) in his Credibility of the Gospel History wrote,

PHILEAS, BISHOP OF TMUIS IN EGYPT; AND PHILOROMUS, RECEIVER-GENERAL AT ALEXANDRIA.

'PHILEAS,' says Jerom, 'of a city in Egypt called Thmuis, of a noble family, and a large estate, accepted an episcopal charge. He wrote an excellent book in praise of the martyrs. After a long debate with the judge, who commanded him to sacrifice, he was beheaded for Christ under the same persecutor, by whose orders Lucian suffered at Nicomedia.'

Jerom means the emperor Maximin. But learned men are not agreed about the year of this good man's martyrdom. By Cave it is placed in 311, by Basnage in 311 or 312, by Tillemont after 306, and before the edict in 311 or 312. The place of his martyrdom is now, I think, generally allowed to be Alexandria, though Valesius once inclined to Thebais.

Phileas flourished, as Cave computes, near the end of the third century, about the year 296. It is likely that Thmuis was the place both of his nativity and his episcopate.

Eusebius in his Ecclesiastical History has a long passage of a letter of Phileas to the Christians at Thmuis; which is generally reckoned to be the same that Jerom calls a book in Praise of the Martyrs.

Eusebius at the same time gives an account of the martyrdom of Philoromus. And there are still extant Acts of the martyrdoms of these two persons, which are esteemed genuine and sincere by Tillemont and Ruinart: and indeed they are in the main agreeable to Eusebius: but yet it seems to me that they are interpolated: at least, I am of opinion that they are not to be relied upon as sincere and uncorrupt, for which reason I shall not make any use of them.

But I shall immediately transcribe Eusebius's history of the death both of Phileas and Philoromus, with a part of the just-mentioned passage of the letter written by the former.

Our ecclesiastical historian then, having mentioned divers other instances of heroic courage and firmness of mind in the cause of truth, adds: 'And these are indeed admirable : but yet more admirable are they who, distinguished by their wealth, high birth, honours, learning, and eloquence, preferred before all other things true religion and faith in Jesus Christ. Among these was Philoromus, who bore no ordinary office, but was the emperor's receiver-general at Alexandria; and, as became his high station in the Roman government, daily heard causes, attended by a guard of soldiers. Phileas, likewise, bishop of the church at Thmuis, who had with reputation discharged all public offices in his own country, and was eminent for his philosophical learning, when many of their kindred and other honourable friends, and some of the magistrates, and even the judge himself advised them to take pity upon themselves, and to consider their wives and children, would not by all their entreaties be induced, out of a regard to their own life, to transgress the divine laws concerning denying and confessing our Saviour; but with a manly and courageous and philosophic mind, or rather with a religious heart truly devoted to God, having withstood all the threatenings and abuses of the judge, they were both beheaded.'

'But, forasmuch as we said that Phileas was eminent for learning, let him be produced as his own witness. At the same time he shows what he himself was, he will relate the martyrdoms that happened in his time at Alexandria much more exactly than we can do. Thus then he writes in his epistle to the people at Thmuis:' "All these ensamples and patterns and excellent admonitions being set before us in the divine and sacred scriptures, the blessed martyrs among us, without hesitation fixing the eye of their soul upon God over all, and willingly embracing death for the sake of religion, stedfastly adhered to their calling: knowing that our Lord Jesus Christ became man for our sake, that he might destroy all sin, and afford us helps for obtaining eternal life: For he did not earnestly desire to appear like God, but made himself of no reputation, taking the form of a servant: and being found in fashion as a man, he humbled himself unto death, even the death of the cross:" Philip. ii. 6, 7. " Wherefore also these martyrs, full of Christ, "earnestly desiring the greatest gifts," (1 Cor. xii. 31.) endured not once only, but some of them often, all kinds of pains and tortures that can be invented; and, though the officers did their utmost by words and deeds to terrify them, they were not disheartened, "because perfect love casteth out fear:" 1 John iv. 18.

I omit the rest which may be seen in Eusebius himself, who, having finished his extracts, adds : 'These are the words of a true philosopher, and a martyr filled with the love of God : which, when in prison, before the final sentence of the judge, be sent to the people under his care; partly informing them what were his own circumstances, partly exhorting them to hold fast the faith of Christ, even after his death, which was then near at hand.'

I suppose likewise, that none will dispute my interpretation of that phrase, which in our English translation is rendered, 'thought it not robbery to be equal with God;' for it is here evidently used and understood by Phileas, as expressive of our Lord's humility, not of his dignity and greatness. In the like manner have we already observed that expression understood by several ancient christian writers.

I would just observe that, at the end of the passage cited by Eusebius, Phileas quotes some precepts of the Old Testament, as sacred scripture.

Phileas is elsewhere mentioned by Eusebius among other bishops of Egypt, who suffered martyrdom in Dioclesian's persecution.

== Sources ==
- Butler, Alban (1866), The Lives of the Fathers, Martyrs, and Other Principal Saints, vol. 2, James Duffy This article incorporates text from this source, which is in the public domain.
- Jerome, Lives of Illustrious Men, Philip Schaff: NPNF2-03. Theodoret, Jerome, Gennadius, & Rufinus: Historical Writings, Christian Classics Ethereal Library
- Lardner, Nathaniel (1838), The Works of Nathaniel Lardner, vol. 3, W. Ball This article incorporates text from this source, which is in the public domain.
- St. Augustine's Abbey, Ramsgate (1921), The Book of saints : a dictionary of servants of God canonized by the Catholic Church, London: A. & C. Black, ltd. This article incorporates text from this source, which is in the public domain.
