= Martyrs of Adrianople =

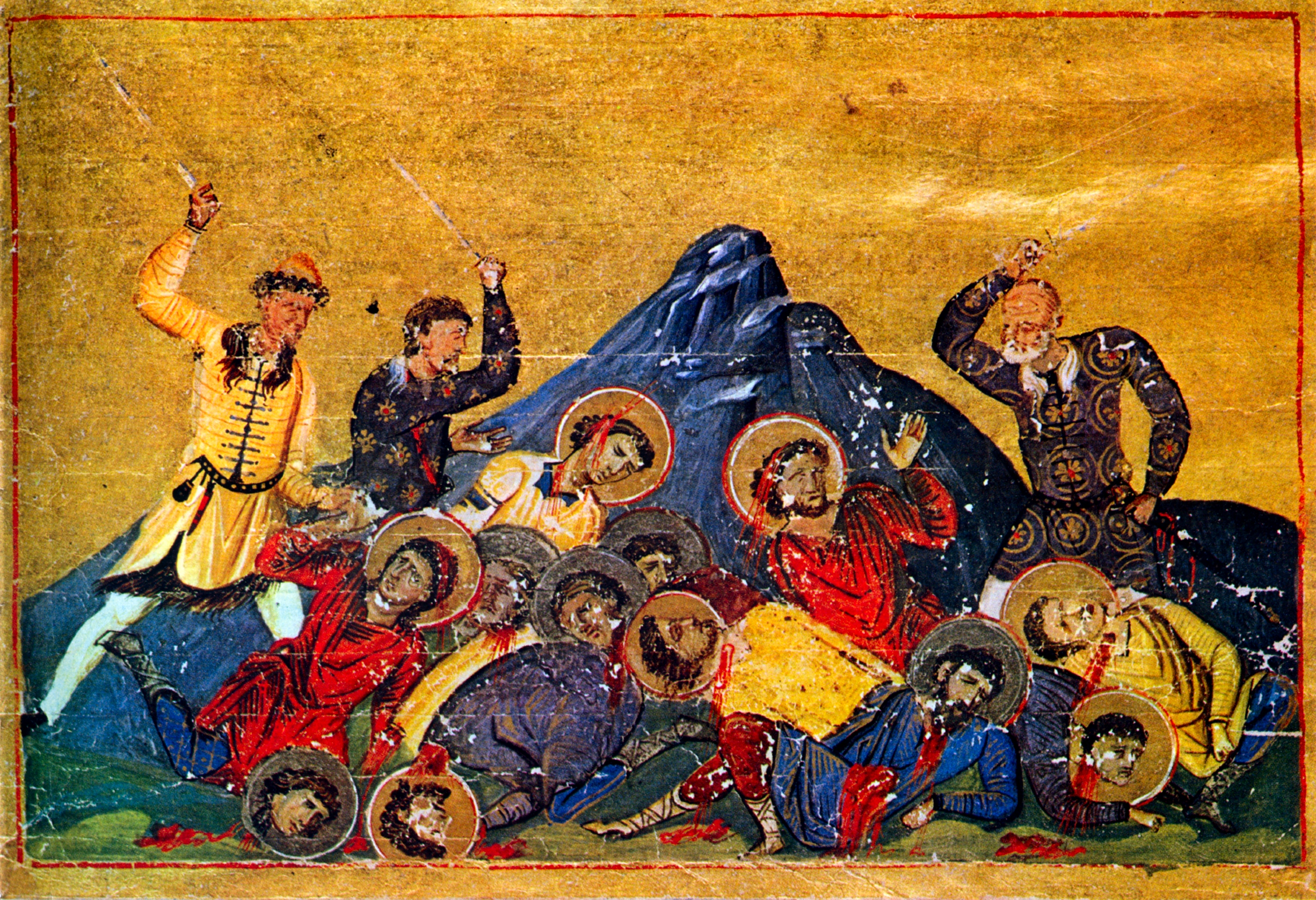
- Died: 815, Adrianople, First Bulgarian Empire (modern-day Edirne, Turkey)
- Venerated in: Eastern Orthodox Church
- Feast: 22 January

The Martyrs of Adrianople, also known and venerated as the 377 Martyred Companions in Bulgaria, were three hundred and seventy-seven Christians who were executed in martyrdom in 815. They are commemorated by the Eastern Orthodox Church on 22 January.

== Biography ==
Emperor Nikephoros I invaded Bulgaria and sacked the capital of Pliska in 811, but was killed and his army annihilated at the Battle of Varbitsa Pass as he returned to Roman territory. Khan Krum's peace offer was rejected by Emperor Michael I Rangabe, and the Bulgarians invaded the Roman Empire in the spring of 812. Krum conquered Develtos and transplanted its population to Bulgaria in June, and seized Adrianople in September 813. At Adrianople, Krum threw Manuel, Archbishop of Adrianople, to the ground and trampled on his neck.

According to the Menologion of Basil II, Krum began the persecution of Christians prior to his death and was continued by a certain Čok (Tzok) who had all Christians who refused to renounce their faith executed. However, the Synaxarion of Constantinople states that the persecution began after Krum's death in April 814 on the orders of Khan Ditzevg, the successor of Dukum, who had ruled briefly after Krum's death. Omurtag later became khan and ordered the execution of all Christians who refused to renounce their faith. Three hundred and seventy seven Christians were killed, and the following are known by name:

- Manuel, Archbishop of Adrianople – The synaxarion records that Ditzevg had Manuel cut in two, cut off his arms, and fed his remains to dogs; afterwards, Ditzevg was afflicted with blindness and was killed by his own soldiers. The menologion states that Krum had Manuel killed, and subsequently became blind and was strangled by his soldiers.
- George, Archbishop of Develtos – George had negotiated the surrender of Develtos to Krum in 812, and had been transplanted to Bulgaria with the city's population. He was clubbed to death and decapitated.
- Leo, Bishop of Nicaea in Thrace – A eunuch, Leo had his stomach cut open.
- Peter, bishop – He was clubbed to death and decapitated.
- John, strategos – A renegade, John had served under Tuk, ichirgu boilas, (Note: Tuk and Tzok may be the same person.) with Bardanes on the Bulgarian right flank during the Battle of Versinikia, but was beheaded for his faith.
- Leo, strategos – A renegade, Leo had served under Krum's brother at the centre of the Bulgarian army during the Battle of Versinikia, and was beheaded.
- Parodos, priest – He was stoned to death.
- Gabriel and Sionios – They were both beheaded.
- Loubomiros and Chotomiros – Slavs, they are named in a canon composed by either Saint Joseph the Confessor or Saint Joseph the Hymnographer. Their martyrdom indicates the spread of Christianity amongst the Slavs of Bulgaria.
- Koupergos and Asfir – They may have been Bulgars.

== Hagiography ==
An original account of the martyrs was likely made based on the testimonies of prisoners of war released by Bulgaria after the Treaty of 816 in the first half of the 9th century at the Monastery of Stoudios at Constantinople which the menologion and synaxarion are based on. Sophoulis suggests that the story of the martyrdom was Roman propaganda to deter officials from collaborating with the Bulgars and strengthen the resolve of cities vulnerable to Bulgar attack. He also suggests that the number of martyrs may be exaggerated.

== Bibliography ==
- Curta, Florin (2006). Southeastern Europe in the Middle Ages, 500–1250. Cambridge University Press.
- Hupchick, Dennis P. (2017). The Bulgarian-Byzantine Wars for Early Medieval Balkan Hegemony: Silver-Lined Skulls and Blinded Armies. Springer.
- Sophoulis, Panos (2011). Byzantium and Bulgaria, 775-831. BRILL.
