= Saint Aldate =

6th-century bishop and saint from England

Saint Aldate (/ˈɔːldeɪt/; Old Welsh, Eldad; died 577) was a bishop, venerated as a saint in the Roman Catholic Church with the feast day of 4 February, and the Eastern Orthodox Church. He was probably a Briton killed by the Anglo-Saxons at the Battle of Deorham.

According to the historian David Farmer "nothing seems to be known of him: it was even suggested (unconvincingly) that his name was a corruption of "old gate".

== Veneration ==
Aldate is mentioned in the Sarum and other martyrologies; his feast occurs in a Gloucester calendar (14th-century addition); churches were dedicated to him at Gloucester and Oxford, giving name to a famous Oxford street: St Aldate's, Oxford and a minor street in Gloucester. There is also a St Aldate's Tavern, a bed-and-breakfast, as a annex to Christ Church, and a room at the Oxford Town Hall.

He is also venerated as a saint in the Eastern Orthodox Church.
