= Anastasius of Persia =

Christian martyr (died 628)

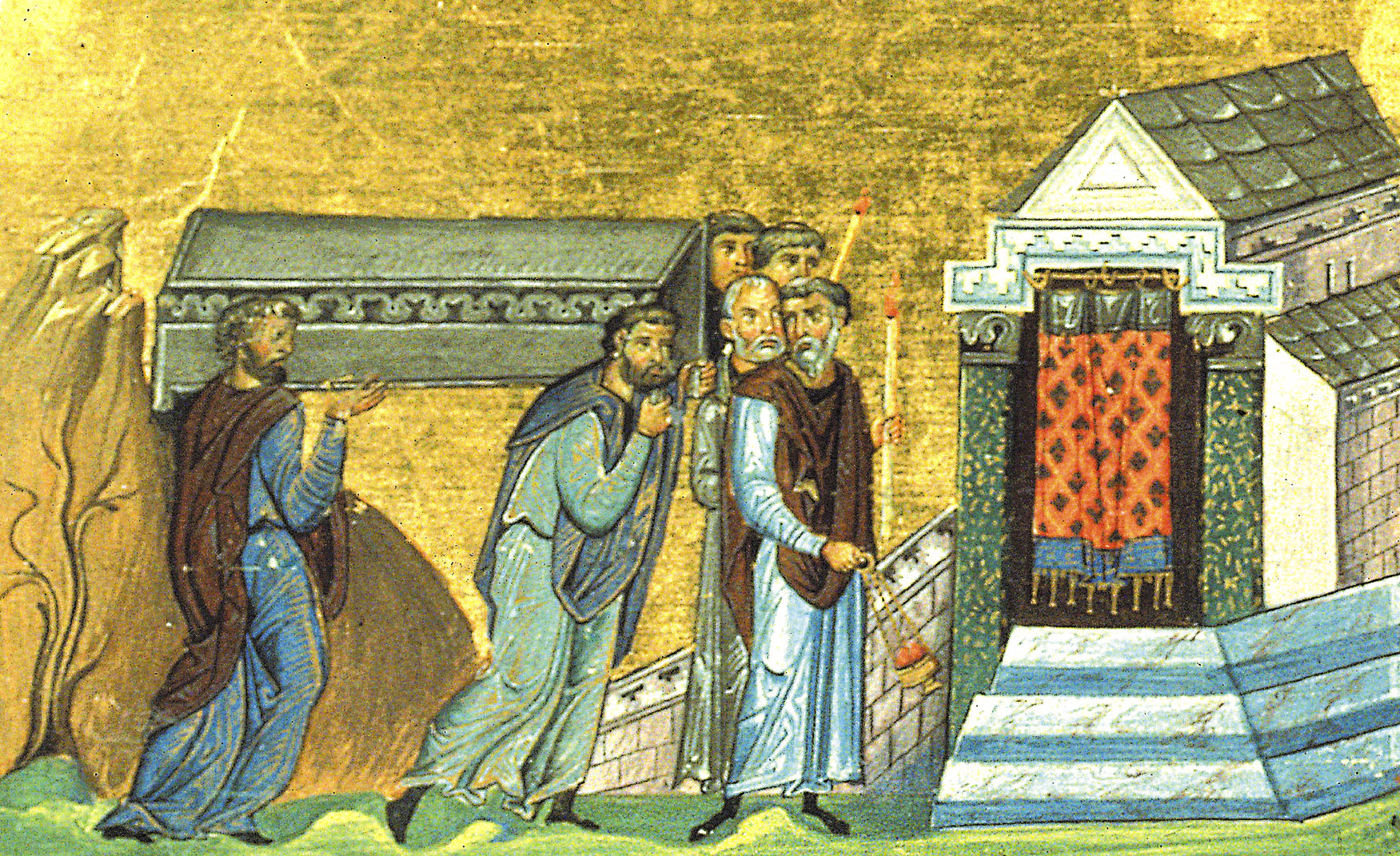
- The burial of Anastasius in the Menologion of Basil II

Saint & Martyr
- Born: 6th Century; Ray
- Died: 22 January 628; Euphrates Valley
- Venerated in: Eastern Orthodox Church; Eastern Catholic Churches; Roman Catholic Church
- Canonized: pre-congregation
- Feast: 22 January

Saint Anastasius of Persia, also known by his native name Magundat, was a Zoroastrian soldier in the Sasanian army who later became a convert to Christianity and was martyred in 628.

== Biography ==
Anastasius was born in the city of Ray. He was the son of a magus named Bavi. He was a soldier in the army of Khosrow II (r. 590–628) and participated in the capture of the True Cross in Jerusalem, which was carried to the Sasanian capital Ctesiphon.

The occasion prompted him to ask for information about the Christian religion. He then experienced a conversion of faith, left the army, became a Christian, and afterwards a monk in Jerusalem. He was baptized by Modestus, receiving the Christian name Anastasius to honor the resurrection of Jesus Christ ("Anástasis" in Greek).

After seven years of monastic observance, he went to Caesarea, then subject to the Sasanians. There he interrupted and ridiculed the Zoroastrian priests for their religion, and was as a result arrested by the local marzban, taken prisoner, cruelly tortured to make him abjure, and finally carried down near the Euphrates, to a place called Barsaloe (or Bethsaloe according to the Bollandists), where his tortures were continued while at the same time the highest honors in the service of King Khosrow II as a magus were promised him if he would renounce Christianity.

Finally, after refusing to abjure, with seventy others, he was strangled to death and decapitated on January 22, 628.

== Veneration ==
His body, which was thrown to the dogs but left untouched by them, was carried from the place of his martyrdom to Palestine, then to Constantinople, and finally to Rome where the relics were venerated at the Tre Fontane Abbey.

A Passio written in Greek was devoted to the saint. An adapted Latin translation, possibly by Archbishop Theodore of Canterbury, was available to the Anglo-Saxon church historian Bede, who criticized the result and took it upon himself to 'improve' it. There are no surviving manuscripts of Bede's revision, though one did survive as late as the 15th century.

His feast day is 22 January.

== Sources ==
- Howard-Johnston, James (2010). "ḴOSROW II". Encyclopaedia Iranica, Online Edition.
- Acta Sanctorum, 3 Jan.
- Butler, Lives of the Saints, 22 Jan.
- Laistner, M.L.W.; King, H.H. (1943). A Hand-List of Bede Manuscripts. Ithaca, NY: Cornell University Press.
- Walker, Joel Thomas (2006). The Legend of Mar Qardagh: Narrative and Christian Heroism in Late Antique Iraq. University of California Press. ISBN 978-0-520-93219-7.
- Payne, Richard E. (2015). A State of Mixture: Christians, Zoroastrians, and Iranian Political Culture in Late Antiquity. Univ of California Press. ISBN 9780520961531.
